= Bowknot Lake =

Alpine lake in the state of Idaho

- Location within Idaho Location within the United States
- Location: Custer County, Idaho
- Coordinates: 43°57′59″N 114°57′33″W
- Lake type: Glacial
- Primary outflows: Creek to Salmon River
- Basin countries: United States
- Max. length: 0.10 mi (0.16 km)
- Max. width: 0.09 mi (0.14 km)
- Surface elevation: 8,245 ft (2,513 m)

Bowknot Lake is a small alpine lake in Custer County, Idaho, United States, located in the Sawtooth Mountains in the Sawtooth National Recreation Area. Sawtooth National Forest trial 096 leads to Bowknot Lake.

Bowknot Lake is in the Sawtooth Wilderness, and a wilderness permit can be obtained at a registration box at trailheads or wilderness boundaries. Toxaway Lake is upstream of Bowknot Lake while Farley Lake, McDonald Lake, and Yellow Belly Lake are downstream.

== See also ==
- List of lakes of the Sawtooth Mountains (Idaho)
- Sawtooth National Forest
- Sawtooth National Recreation Area
- Sawtooth Range (Idaho)
