= Elk Lake (Sawtooth Wilderness) =

Lake in Boise County, Idaho, United States

- Location within Idaho Location within the United States
- Location: Boise County, Idaho
- Coordinates: 44°01′29″N 115°04′18″W
- Primary inflows: South Fork Payette River
- Primary outflows: South Fork Payette River
- Basin countries: United States
- Max. length: 0.40 mi (0.64 km)
- Max. width: 0.16 mi (0.26 km)
- Surface elevation: 6,650 ft (2,030 m)

Elk Lake is an alpine lake in Boise County, Idaho, United States, located in the Sawtooth Mountains in the Sawtooth National Recreation Area. The lake is approximately 15 miles (24 km) southwest of Stanley and 9.5 miles (15.3 km) southeast of Grandjean. Located in the remote central Sawtooth Wilderness, Elk Lake is most easily reached from the Grandjean trailhead to the northwest and downstream along the South Fork of the Payette River.

Elk Lake is a shallow non-glacial lake (in contrast to almost all other lakes in the Sawtooths) that is largely wetlands due to sedimentation. There are several glacial lakes upstream of Elk Lake, including Vernon Lake, Edna Lake, Ardeth Lake, and Virginia Lake.

Edna Lake is in the Sawtooth Wilderness and wilderness permit can be obtained at trailheads.

== See also ==
- List of lakes of the Sawtooth Mountains (Idaho)
- Sawtooth National Forest
- Sawtooth National Recreation Area
- Sawtooth Range (Idaho)
