= Payette Peak =

Mountain in Idaho, United States

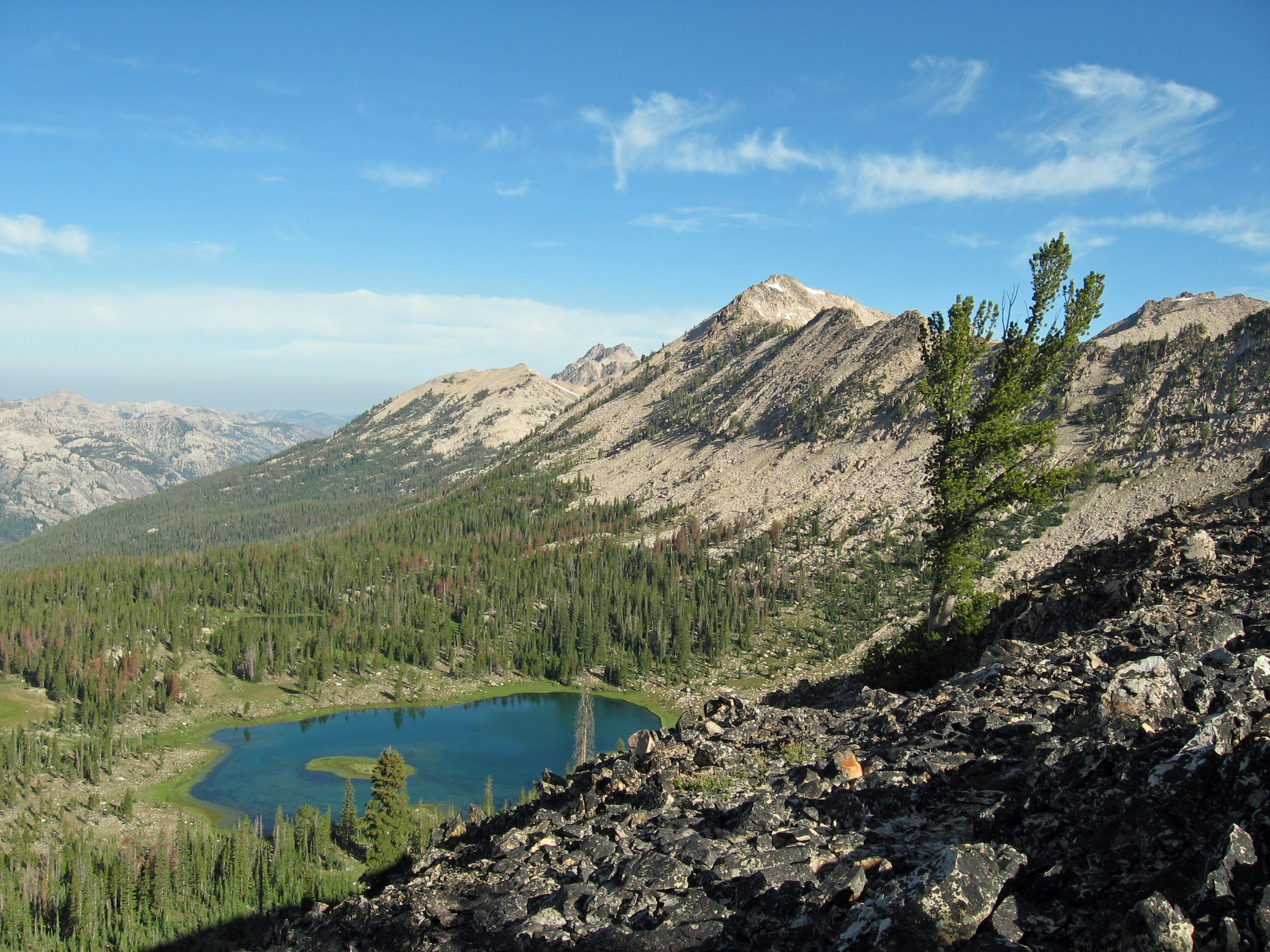
- Payette Peak right of center and Rendezvous Lake

Highest point
- Elevation: 10,221 ft (3,115 m)
- Prominence: 373 ft (114 m)
- Parent peak: Mount Cramer
- Coordinates: 43°59′32″N 114°59′15″W

Geography
- Location within Idaho
- Location: Boise and Custer counties, Idaho, U.S.
- Parent range: Sawtooth Range
- Topo map: USGS Snowyside Peak

Climbing
- Easiest route: class 2

Payette Peak, at 10,221 feet (3,115 m) above sea level is a peak in the Sawtooth Range of Idaho. The peak is located in the Sawtooth Wilderness of Sawtooth National Recreation Area on the border of Boise and Custer counties. The peak is located 1.33 mi (2.14 km) south of Mount Cramer, its line parent. Payette Peak rises above the southwest end of Hidden Lake.
