= Island Lake (Idaho) =

Lake in Idaho, United States

- Location within Idaho Location within the United States
- Location: Elmore County, Idaho
- Coordinates: 43.947719°N 115.124469°W
- Lake type: Glacial
- Primary outflows: Johnson Creek to Middle Fork Boise River
- Basin countries: United States
- Max. length: 0.10 mi (0.16 km)
- Max. width: 0.06 mi (0.097 km)
- Surface elevation: 8,845 ft (2,696 m)
- Islands: 1

Island Lake is a small alpine lake in Elmore County, Idaho, United States, located in the Sawtooth Mountains in the Sawtooth National Recreation Area. No trails lead to Island Lake although Sawtooth National Forest trails 459, 494, and 458 pass relatively close by.

Island Lake is in the Sawtooth Wilderness, and a wilderness permit can be obtained at a registration box at trailheads or wilderness boundaries. The lake gets its name from one small 100 ft (30 m) long island in the southern part of the lake. Snowbank Lake is 175 ft (53 m) upstream of Island Lake while the Hole is 0.17 mi (0.27 km) downstream.

== See also ==
- List of lakes of the Sawtooth Mountains (Idaho)
- Sawtooth National Forest
- Sawtooth National Recreation Area
- Sawtooth Range (Idaho)
