= Azure Lake (disambiguation) =

Azure Lake may mean:

== Lakes ==
- Azure Lake, a lake in east-central British Columbia
- Azure Lake (Idaho), a glacial lake in Elmore County, Idaho
- Azure Lake (Whatcom County, Washington), a lake in North Cascades National Park
- Azure Lake, a 2 player competition game zone in Sonic the Hedgehog 3
