= Edith Lake =

Alpine lake in the state of Idaho

- Location within Idaho Location within the United States
- Location: Custer County, Idaho
- Coordinates: 43°58′37″N 114°57′33″W
- Lake type: Glacial
- Primary outflows: Creek to Salmon River
- Basin countries: United States
- Max. length: 0.14 mi (0.23 km)
- Max. width: 0.08 mi (0.13 km)
- Surface elevation: 8,660 ft (2,640 m)

Edith Lake is a small alpine lake in Custer County, Idaho, United States, located high in the Sawtooth Mountains in the Sawtooth National Recreation Area. The lake is approximately 16.5 miles (26.6 km) south of Stanley. A trail from the Yellow Belly Lake and Pettit Lake trailheads leads towards Edith Lake via Farley Lake. These trailheads can be accessed from State Highway 75 via Sawtooth National Forest road 208.

With a surface elevation of 8,660 feet (2,640 m) above sea level, Sawtooth Lake often remains frozen into early summer.

Edith Lake is in the Sawtooth Wilderness and wilderness permit can be obtained at trailheads. The hike to Edith Lake from the Yellow Belly Lake trailhead is about 9 miles (14 km).

== See also ==
- List of lakes of the Sawtooth Mountains (Idaho)
- Sawtooth National Forest
- Sawtooth National Recreation Area
- Sawtooth Range (Idaho)
