= List of lakes of the Sawtooth Mountains (Idaho) =

There are hundreds of lakes in the Sawtooth Mountains, most of which have been created by alpine glaciers. The majority of the lakes are within the Sawtooth Wilderness, but several are not yet still within Sawtooth National Recreation Area The largest lakes are Redfish, Alturas, Pettit, Yellow Belly, Stanley, and Sawtooth lakes.

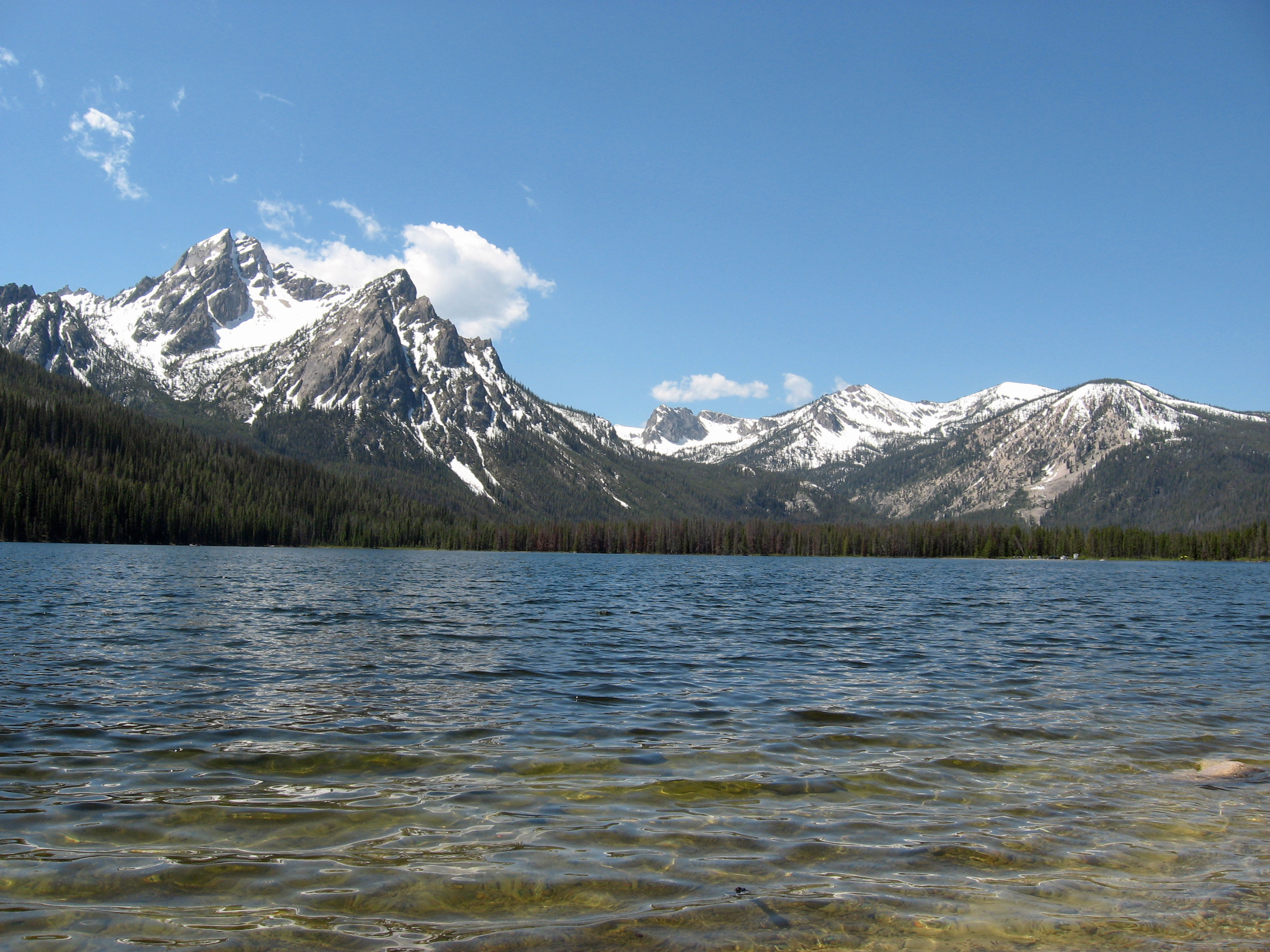
McGown Peak and Stanley Lake

== Lakes not in the Sawtooth Wilderness ==
Lakes not in the Sawtooth Wilderness
Lake	Elevation	Max. length	Max. width	Location	Primary Outflow	County
Alturas Lake	7,014 ft 2138 m	10,302 ft 3140 m	0.8 mi 1.29 km	43.913517°N 114.860569°W	Alturas Lake Creek	Blaine
Little Redfish Lake	6,490 ft 1978 m	1,804 ft 550 m	0.46 mi 0.74 km	44.158611°N 114.908333°W	Redfish Lake Creek	Custer
Lower Hanson Lake	7,972 ft 2430 m	1,148 ft 350 m	0.11 mi 0.18 km	44.207503°N 115.113717°W	Stanley Lake Creek	Custer
McDonald Lake	7,096 ft 2163 m	1,476 ft 450 m	0.17 mi 0.27 km	43.998047°N 114.889469°W	Yellow Belly Lake Creek	Custer
Middle Hanson Lake	8,114 ft 2473 m	1,411 ft 430 m	0.16 mi 0.26 km	44.209375°N 115.117028°W	Stanley Lake Creek	Custer
Perkins Lake	7,014 ft 2138 m	2,067 ft 630 m	0.24 mi 0.39 km	43.928644°N 114.840403°W	Alturas Lake Creek	Blaine
Pettit Lake	6,995 ft 2132 m	7,382 ft 2250 m	0.55 mi 0.89 km	43.979261°N 114.880456°W	Pettit Lake Creek	Blaine
Redfish Lake	6,549 ft 1996 m	23,622 ft 7200 m	0.72 mi 1.16 km	44.116667°N 114.933333°W	Redfish Lake Creek	Custer
Stanley Lake	6,512 ft 1985 m	5,249 ft 1600 m	0.5 mi 0.8 km	44.244200°N 115.05900°W	Stanley Lake Creek	Custer
Upper Hanson Lake	8,530 ft 2600 m	1,115 ft 340 m	0.04 mi 0.06 km	44.210444°N 115.123067°W	Stanley Lake Creek	Custer
Yellow Belly Lake	7,077 ft 2157 m	4,265 ft 1300 m	0.55 mi 0.89 km	44.000803°N 114.875131°W	Yellow Belly Lake Creek	Custer

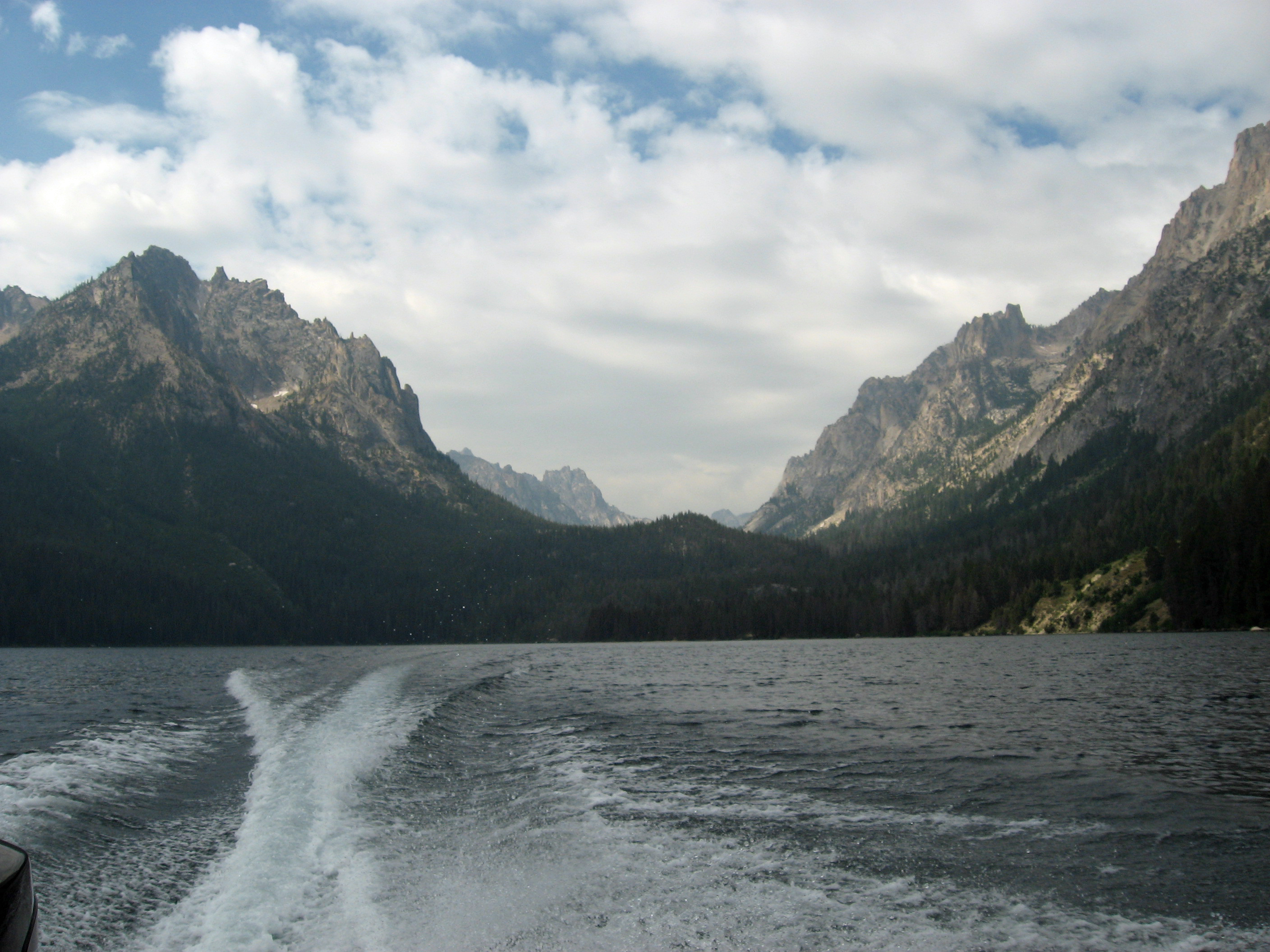
Grand Mogul at SW end of Redfish Lake (Redfish Lake Creek Canyon)

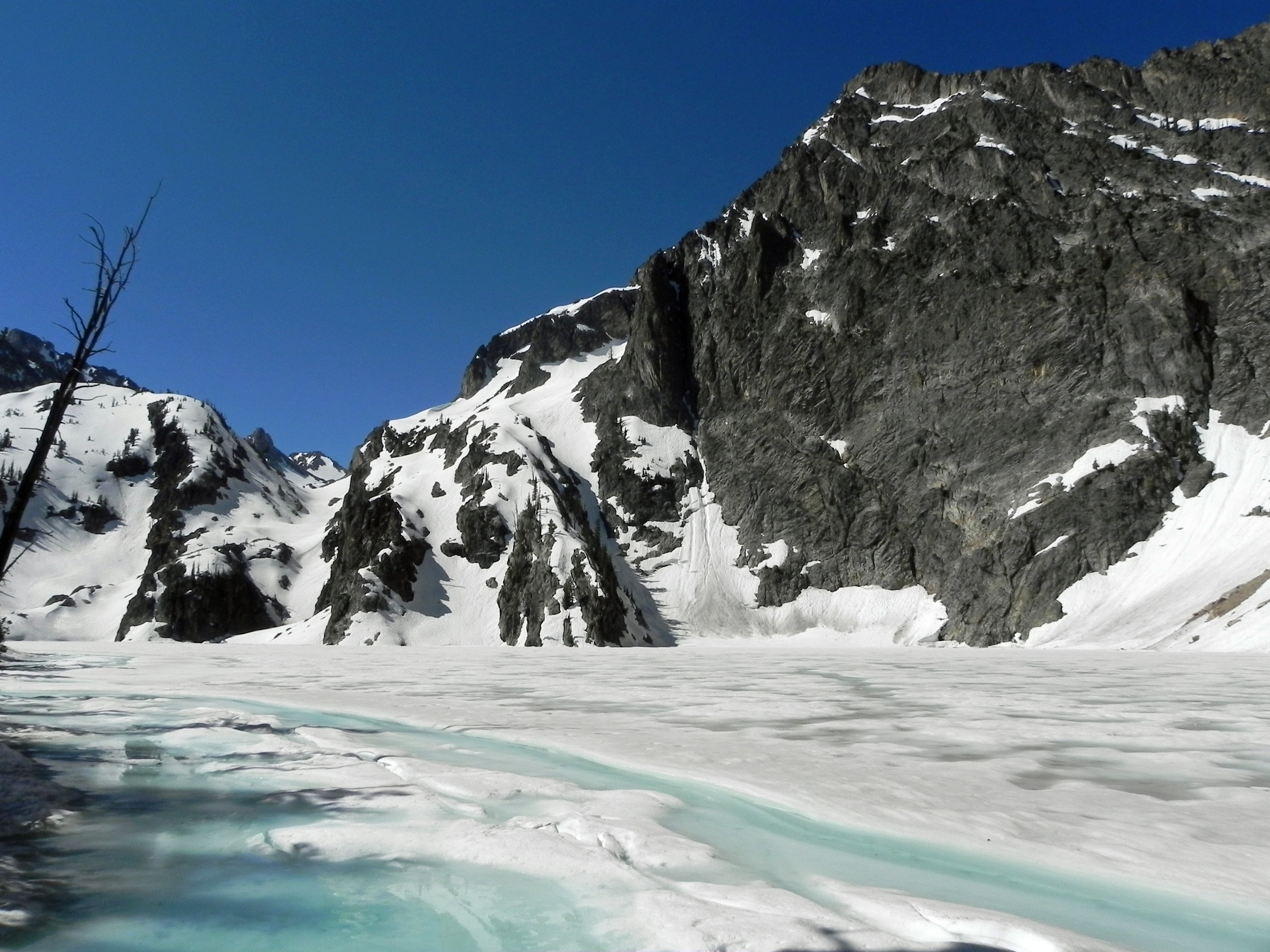
Goat Lake

== Lakes in the Sawtooth Wilderness ==
Lake Chains in the Sawtooth Wilderness (lakes not covered individually below)
Lake	Lowest Elevation	Number of Lakes	Location	Primary Outflow	County	
Bench Lakes	7,743 ft 2360 m		5	44.117031°N 114.950625°W	Redfish Lake Creek	Custer
Feather Lakes	8,796 ft 2681 m		4	44.06735°N 115.051061°W	Goat Creek	Boise
McGown Lakes	8,005 ft 2440 m		7	44.185258°N 115.083264°W	Stanley Lake Creek	Custer
Saddleback Lakes	8,366 ft 2550 m		5	44.063853°N 114.971986°W	Redfish Lake Creek	Custer
Stevens Lakes	8,366 ft 2550 m		4	44.108647°N 115.017631°W	Fishhook Creek	Custer
Trail Creek Lakes	8,005 ft 2440 m		5	44.158425°N 115.087039°W	Trail Creek	Boise
Trailer Lakes	8,563 ft 2610 m		3	44.165400°N 115.072894°W	Trail Creek	Boise
Twin Lakes	8,858 ft 2700 m		2	43.936242°N 114.955422°W	Pettit Lake Creek	Blaine
Upper Redfish Lakes	8,675 ft 2644 m		5	44.046122°N 115.035547°W	Redfish Lake Creek	Custer

Lakes in the Sawtooth Wilderness
Lake	Elevation	Max. length	Max. width	Location	Primary Outflow	County
Alidade Lake	7,943 ft 2421 m	951 ft 290 m	0.78 mi 1.26 km	43.961464°N 115.165225°W	Alturas Lake Creek	Elmore
Alice Lake	8,602 ft 2622 m	3,806 ft 1160 m	0.23 mi 0.37 km	43.9429°N 114.940853°W	Pettit Lake Creek	Blaine
Alpine Lake (north)	7,828 ft 2386 m	1,575 ft 480 m	0.18 mi 0.29 km	44.181103°N 115.053722°W	Iron Creek	Custer
Alpine Lake (central)	8,337 ft 2541 m	1,575 ft 480 m	0.2 mi 0.32 km	44.064558°N 115.022608°W	Redfish Lake Creek	Custer
Ardeth Lake	8,228 ft 2508 m	2,625 ft 800 m	0.34 mi 0.55 km	43.965219°N 115.014872°W	Tenlake Creek	Boise
Arrowhead Lake	8,796 ft 2681 m	623 ft 190 m	0.11 mi 0.18 km	43.969564°N 115.117728°W	Johnson Creek	Elmore
Azure Lake	8,268 ft 2520 m	1,214 ft 370 m	0.17 mi 0.27 km	43.965361°N 115.132731°W	Johnson Creek	Boise
Baron Lake	8,310 ft 2533 m	2,526 ft 770 m	0.3 mi 0.48 km	44.081675°N 115.033008°W	Baron Creek	Boise
Benedict Lake	8,268 ft 2520 m	886 ft 270 m	0.09 mi 0.14 km	43.963989°N 115.058989°W	Benedict Creek	Boise
Bluebox Lake	8,793 ft 2680 m	1,148 ft 350 m	0.15 mi 0.24 km	44.157117°N 115.037167°W	North Fork Baron Creek	Boise
Blue Jay Lake	8,530 ft 2600 m	787 ft 240 m	0.11 mi 0.18 km	43.925489°N 115.094483°W	Queens River	Elmore
Blue Rock Lake	8,241 ft 2512 m	689 ft 210 m	0.09 mi 0.14 km	44.064039°N 115.057525°W	Goat Creek	Boise
Bowknot Lake	8,245 ft 2513 m	525 ft 160 m	0.09 mi 0.14 km	43.966525°N 114.959161°W	Yellow Belly Lake Creek	Custer
Braxon Lake	8,268 ft 2520 m	689 ft 210 m	0.09 mi 0.14 km	44.087669°N 115.013014°W	Baron Creek	Boise
Browns Lake	8,301 ft 2530 m	1,575 ft 480 m	0.16 mi 0.26 km	43.931997°N 115.144375°W	Johnson Creek	Elmore
Camp Lake	8,524 ft 2598 m	787 ft 240 m	0.06 mi 0.1 km	43.938556°N 115.003792°W	Flytrip Creek	Elmore
Chickadee Lake	8,714 ft 2656 m	623 ft 190 m	0.05 mi 0.08 km	43.931056°N 115.059819°W	Timpa Creek	Elmore
Cliff Lake	8,514 ft 2595 m	361 ft 110 m	0.04 mi 0.06 km	43.941019°N 115.124411°W	Queens River	Elmore
Confusion Lake	8,268 ft 2520 m	689 ft 210 m	0.08 mi 0.13 km	43.939081°N 115.053333°W	Timpa Creek	Elmore
Cony Lake	8,770 ft 2673 m	1,115 ft 340 m	0.11 mi 0.18 km	44.061583°N 115.083478°W	Goat Creek	Boise
Crooked Lake	8,104 ft 2470 m	459 ft 140 m	0.06 mi 0.1 km	44.195622°N 115.060933°W	Crooked Creek	Custer
Dandy Lake	8,497 ft 2590 m	951 ft 290 m	0.07 mi 0.11 km	43.917164°N 115.086631°W	Rock Creek	Elmore
Diamond Lake	8,074 ft 2461 m	853 ft 260 m	0.09 mi 0.14 km	43.927158°N 115.155297°W	Little Queens River	Elmore
Edith Lake	8,661 ft 2640 m	755 ft 230 m	0.08 mi 0.13 km	43.976975°N 114.959086°W	Yellow Belly Lake Creek	Custer
Edna Lake	8,406 ft 2562 m	2,067 ft 630 m	0.27 mi 0.43 km	43.970897°N 114.992892°W	South Fork Payette River	Boise
Elk Lake	6,660 ft 2030 m	2,100 ft 640 m	0.16 mi 0.26 km	44.024856°N 115.071592°W	South Fork Payette River	Boise
Everly Lake	8,661 ft 2640 m	1,542 ft 470 m	0.12 mi 0.19 km	43.955272°N 115.097458°W	Benedict Creek	Boise
Farley Lake	7,746 ft 2361 m	2,165 ft 660 m	0.23 mi 0.37 km	43.979528°N 114.930892°W	Yellow Belly Lake Creek	Custer
Glacier Lake	8,596 ft 2620 m	1,050 ft 320 m	0.08 mi 0.13 km	43.94305°N 115.131242°W	Johnson Creek	Elmore
Goat Lake	8,235 ft 2510 m	2,329 ft 710 m	0.27 mi 0.43 km	44.174309°N 115.019581°W	Goat Creek	Custer
Heart Lake	8,576 ft 2614 m	1,050 ft 320 m	0.09 mi 0.15 km	43.939586°N 114.997858°W	Flytrip Creek	Elmore
Hell Roaring Lake	7,408 ft 2258 m	3,379 ft 1030 m	0.24 mi 0.39 km	44.023822°N 114.936381°W	Hell Roaring Creek	Custer
Hidden Lake	8,563 ft 2610 m	3,051 ft 930 m	0.16 mi 0.26 km	44.000047°N 114.998117°W	South Fork Payette River	Boise
The Hole	8,530 ft 2600 m	623 ft 190 m	0.08 mi 0.13 km	43.946958°N 115.129083°W	Johnson Creek	Elmore
Imogene Lake	8,432 ft 2570 m	3,182 ft 970 m	0.25 mi 0.4 km	43.995844°N 114.951389°W	Hell Roaring Creek	Custer
Island Lake	8,845 ft 2696 m	525 ft 160 m	0.06 mi 0.1 km	43.947719°N 115.124469°W	Johnson Creek	Elmore
Johnson Lake	8,005 ft 2440 m	787 ft 240 m	0.09 mi 0.14 km	43.945847°N 115.144086°W	Johnson Creek	Elmore
Lake Ingeborg	8,858 ft 2700 m	1,640 ft 500 m	0.19 mi 0.31 km	43.950431°N 115.04255°W	Middle Fork Boise River	Elmore
Lake Kathryn	9,022 ft 2750 m	1,804 ft 550 m	0.22 mi 0.35 km	44.039108°N 115.036353°W	Redfish Lake Creek	Custer
Leah Lake	8,533 ft 2601 m	2,264 ft 690 m	0.17 mi 0.27 km	43.907381°N 114.973239°W	Alpine Creek	Blaine
Leggit Lake	8,530 ft 2600 m	1,312 ft 400 m	0.15 mi 0.24 km	43.772539°N 115.041986°W	Leggit Creek	Elmore
Lily Lake	6,755 ft 2059 m	210 ft 64 m	0.04 mi 0.06 km	44.096906°N 114.958081°W	Redfish Lake Creek	Custer
Limber Lake	8,858 ft 2700 m	623 ft 190 m	0.08 mi 0.13 km	43.945847°N 115.144086°W	Goat Creek	Boise
Little Baron Lake	8,153 ft 2485 m	787 ft 240 m	0.1 mi 0.16 km	44.087736°N 115.033756°W	Baron Creek	Boise
Little Spangle Lake	8,596 ft 2620 m	1,280 ft 390 m	0.17 mi 0.27 km	43.943506°N 115.031122°W	Middle Fork Boise River	Elmore
Little Warbonnet Lake	8,914 ft 2717 m	623 ft 190 m	0.1 mi 0.16 km	44.063436°N 115.043178°W	Goat Creek	Boise
Logjam Lake	8,661 ft 2640 m	1,050 ft 320 m	0.09 mi 0.14 km	43.910894°N 114.982608°W	Alpine Creek	Blaine
Lower Bead Lake	8,556 ft 2608 m	525 ft 160 m	0.06 mi 0.1 km	44.071811°N 115.052883°W	Goat Creek	Boise
Lower Cramer Lake	8,333 ft 2540 m	623 ft 190 m	0.09 mi 0.14 km	44.033086°N 114.994964°W	Redfish Lake Creek	Custer
Low Pass Lake	8,924 ft 2720 m	623 ft 190 m	0.09 mi 0.14 km	43.946408°N 115.049961°W	Timpa Creek	Elmore
Lucille Lake	8,760 ft 2670 m	1,148 ft 350 m	0.2 mi 0.32 km	44.005686°N 114.969014°W	Hell Roaring Creek	Custer
Marshall Lake	7,710 ft 2350 m	591 ft 180 m	0.09 mi 0.14 km	44.158286°N 114.98635°W	Meadow Creek	Custer
McWillards Lake	8,196 ft 2498 m	623 ft 190 m	0.05 mi 0.08 km	44.056944°N 115.063319°W	Goat Creek	Boise
Meadow Lake	8,274 ft 2522 m	361 ft 110 m	0.05 mi 0.08 km	44.053842°N 115.069019°W	Goat Creek	Boise
Middle Cramer Lake	8,366 ft 2550 m	787 ft 240 m	0.09 mi 0.14 km	44.030889°N 114.990892°W	Redfish Lake Creek	Custer
Mushroom Lake	8,563 ft 2610 m	689 ft 210 m	0.12 mi 0.19 km	43.989919°N 114.963872°W	Hell Roaring Creek	Custer
Oreamnus Lake	8,176 ft 2492 m	951 ft 290 m	0.12 mi 0.19 km	44.053842°N 115.069019°W	Goat Creek	Boise
Packrat Lake	8,655 ft 2638 m	1,148 ft 350 m	0.12 mi 0.19 km	44.044889°N 115.054556°W	Goat Creek	Boise
Pancho Lake	8,914 ft 2717 m	591 ft 180 m	49.7 mi 80 km	43.938117°N 115.080303°W	Rock Creek	Elmore
Pats Lake	8,366 ft 2550 m	1,017 ft 310 m	0.13 mi 0.21 km	43.971781°N 115.124683°W	Johnson Creek	Elmore
Plummer Lake	8,596 ft 2620 m	1,017 ft 310 m	0.12 mi 0.19 km	43.951539°N 115.081339°W	Queens River	Elmore
Profile Lake	9,514 ft 2900 m	1,280 ft 390 m	0.19 mi 0.31 km	44.195622°N 115.060933°W	Hell Roaring Creek	Custer
Pulpit Lake	8,596 ft 2620 m	525 ft 160 m	0.04 mi 0.06 km	44.212828°N 115.070086°W	Stanley Lake Creek	Custer
Regan Lake	8,474 ft 2583 m	427 ft 130 m	0.08 mi 0.13 km	44.165825°N 115.076869°W	Trail Creek	Boise
Rendezvous Lake	8,875 ft 2705 m	951 ft 290 m	0.11 mi 0.18 km	43.978506°N 114.975514°W	South Fork Payette River	Boise
Rock Island Lake	8,556 ft 2608 m	1,017 ft 310 m	0.17 mi 0.27 km	43.957539°N 115.130922°W	Johnson Creek	Elmore
Rock Slide Lake	8,661 ft 2640 m	853 ft 260 m	0.1 mi 0.16 km	43.953853°N 115.052414°W	Benedict Creek	Boise
Sawtooth Lake	8,435 ft 2571 m	4,659 ft 1420 m	0.42 mi 0.68 km	44.172200°N 115.063700°W	Iron Creek	Custer
Scenic Lake	8,399 ft 2560 m	1,148 ft 350 m	0.14 mi 0.23 km	43.899486°N 115.143564°W	Scenic Creek	Custer
Slide Lake	8,563 ft 2610 m	318 ft 97 m	0.06 mi 0.1 km	43.939639°N 115.126486°W	Queens River	Elmore
Snowbank Lake	8,875 ft 2705 m	525 ft 160 m	0.07 mi 0.11 km	43.947075°N 115.122292°W	Hell Roaring Creek	Elmore
Spangle Lake	8,586 ft 2617 m	1,673 ft 510 m	0.27 mi 0.43 km	43.947864°N 115.0333°W	Middle Fork Boise River	Elmore
Surprise Lake	8,596 ft 2620 m	853 ft 260 m	0.1 mi 0.16 km	43.935556°N 115.055719°W	Timpa Creek	Elmore
Three Island Lake	8,615 ft 2626 m	1,148 ft 350 m	0.13 mi 0.21 km	43.950536°N 115.062211°W	Benedict Creek	Boise
Three Lake	8,497 ft 2590 m	1,312 ft 400 m	0.21 mi 0.34 km	44.049972°N 115.073997°W	Goat Creek	Boise
Timpa Lake	7,927 ft 2416 m	525 ft 160 m	0.1 mi 0.16 km	43.925217°N 115.053733°W	Timpa Creek	Elmore
Toxaway Lake	8,222 ft 2506 m	4,856 ft 1480 m	0.36 mi 0.58 km	43.962306°N 114.969944°W	Yellow Belly Lake Creek	Custer
Triangle Lake	8,274 ft 2522 m	1,214 ft 370 m	0.17 mi 0.27 km	43.926964°N 115.150203°W	Little Queens River	Elmore
Upper Baron Lake	8,504 ft 2592 m	1,673 ft 510 m	0.16 mi 0.26 km	44.077269°N 115.029719°W	Baron Creek	Boise
Upper Bead Lake	8,694 ft 2650 m	361 ft 110 m	0.07 mi 0.11 km	44.070322°N 115.05065°W	Goat Creek	Boise
Upper Cramer Lake	8,396 ft 2559 m	1,542 ft 470 m	0.25 mi 0.4 km	44.029703°N 114.986939°W	Redfish Lake Creek	Custer
Vernon Lake	8,465 ft 2580 m	1,804 ft 550 m	0.2 mi 0.32 km	43.963600°N 114.992289°W	South Fork Payette River	Boise
Virginia Lake	8,255 ft 2516 m	1,050 ft 320 m	0.13 mi 0.21 km	43.976889°N 114.993233°W	South Fork Payette River	Boise
Warbonnet Lake	8,917 ft 2718 m	951 ft 290 m	0.15 mi 0.24 km	44.063119°N 115.040036°W	Goat Creek	Boise

== See also ==
- Sawtooth National Forest
- Sawtooth National Recreation Area
