= Snowbank Lake =

Snowbank Lake may refer to:

- Snowbank Lake (Idaho) in Elmore County
- Snowbank Lake (Minnesota) in Lake County
- Snowbank Lake (Lewis and Clark County, Montana), a lake in Lewis and Clark County, Montana
