= Glacier Lake =

Glacier Lake may refer to:

- Glacier Lake (Alberta)
- Glacier Lake (Custer County, Idaho)
- Glacier Lake (Elmore County, Idaho)
- Glacier Lake (Onondaga County, New York)
- Glacier Lake School, a school in Lake County, Montana

== See also ==
- Glaciar Lake, a lake in Bolivia
- Glazier Lake, a lake on the border between Maine and New Brunswick
