= Stevens Lake =

Stevens Lake may refer to:

- A lake in Colchester County, Nova Scotia
- Stevens Lakes (Idaho), a chain of lakes
- A lake in Florida, one of the sources of Black Creek
