= Glacier Lake (Elmore County, Idaho) =

Alpine lake in the state of Idaho

- Location within Idaho Location within the United States
- Location: Elmore County, Idaho
- Coordinates: 43.94305°N 115.131242°W
- Lake type: Glacial
- Primary outflows: Johnson Creek to Middle Fork Boise River
- Basin countries: United States
- Max. length: 0.20 mi (0.32 km)
- Max. width: 0.08 mi (0.13 km)
- Surface elevation: 8,610 ft (2,620 m)

Glacier Lake is a small alpine lake in Elmore County, Idaho, United States, located in the Sawtooth Mountains in the Sawtooth National Recreation Area. There are no trails that lead to Glacier Lake, although Sawtooth National Forest trails 459, 494, and 458 are relatively close by.

Glacier Lake is in the Sawtooth Wilderness, and a wilderness permit can be obtained at a registration box at trailheads or wilderness boundaries. The lake is 0.12 mi (0.19 km) upstream of, and 200 ft (61 m) higher than the Hole.

== See also ==
- List of lakes of the Sawtooth Mountains (Idaho)
- Sawtooth National Forest
- Sawtooth National Recreation Area
- Sawtooth Range (Idaho)
