= Braxon Lake =

Lake in Idaho, United States

- Location within Idaho Location within the United States
- Location: Boise County, Idaho
- Coordinates: 44°05′16″N 115°00′47″W
- Lake type: Glacial
- Primary outflows: Baron Creek to South Fork Payette River
- Basin countries: United States
- Max. length: 0.13 mi (0.21 km)
- Max. width: 0.09 mi (0.14 km)
- Surface elevation: 8,270 ft (2,520 m)

Braxon Lake is a small alpine lake in Boise County, Idaho, United States, located in the Sawtooth Mountains in the Sawtooth National Recreation Area. The lake is most easily accessed from Sawtooth National Forest trail 101.

Braxon Lake is in the Sawtooth Wilderness, and a wilderness permit can be obtained at a registration box at trailheads or wilderness boundaries. Braxon Lake is southwest of Braxon Peak.

== See also ==
- List of lakes of the Sawtooth Mountains (Idaho)
- Sawtooth National Forest
- Sawtooth National Recreation Area
- Sawtooth Range (Idaho)
