= McGown Lakes =

Alpine lakes in the state of Idaho

- Location within Idaho Location within the United States
- Interactive map of McGown Lakes
- Location: Sawtooth National Recreation Area; Custer County, Idaho
- Type: Alpine glacial lakes
- Etymology: McGowan Peak
- Part of: Stanley Lake Creek watershed
- Primary inflows: Precipitation
- Basin countries: United States
- Managing agency: National Park Service
- Max. length: 157–690 feet (48–210 m)
- Max. width: 105–360 feet (32–110 m)
- Surface elevation: 7,989–8,504 feet (2,435–2,592 m)

The McGown Lakes are a series of seven small alpine glacial lakes in Custer County, Idaho, United States, located in the Sawtooth Mountains in the Sawtooth National Recreation Area. The lakes are in the Stanley Lake Creek watershed and can be accessed from Sawtooth National Forest trail 640.

The McGown Lakes are in the Sawtooth Wilderness, and a wilderness permit can be obtained at a registration box at trailheads or wilderness boundaries. Sawtooth Lake is located to the east of the McGown Lakes, although in a separate watershed.

McGown Lakes
Lake	Elevation	Max. length	Max. width	Location
McGown Lake 1	2,592 m (8,504 ft)	190 m (620 ft)	110 m (360 ft)	44.177706°N 115.075922°W
McGown Lake 2	2,585 m (8,481 ft)	064 m (210 ft)	032 m (105 ft)	44.179053°N 115.078658°W
McGown Lake 3	2,584 m (8,478 ft)	048 m (157 ft)	032 m (105 ft)	44.179381°N 115.078069°W
McGown Lake 4	2,524 m (8,281 ft)	064 m (210 ft)	032 m (105 ft)	44.179778°N 115.088786°W
McGown Lake 5	2,520 m (8,270 ft)	080 m (260 ft)	031 m (102 ft)	44.184508°N 115.069658°W
McGown Lake 6	2,510 m (8,230 ft)	145 m (476 ft)	065 m (213 ft)	44.183903°N 115.078311°W
McGown Lake 7	2,435 m (7,989 ft)	210 m (690 ft)	110 m (360 ft)	44.185258°N 115.083264°W

== See also ==
- List of lakes of the Sawtooth Mountains (Idaho)
- Sawtooth National Forest
- Sawtooth National Recreation Area
- Sawtooth Range (Idaho)
