= Leggit Lake =

Lake in Elmore County, Idaho, USA

- Location within Idaho Location within the United States
- Location: Elmore County, Idaho
- Coordinates: 43°46′21″N 115°02′31″W
- Type: Glacial
- Primary outflows: Leggit Creek Middle Fork Boise River
- Basin countries: United States
- Max. length: 0.25 mi (0.40 km)
- Max. width: 0.15 mi (0.24 km)
- Surface elevation: 8,540 ft (2,600 m)

Leggit Lake is a small alpine lake in Elmore County, Idaho, United States, located in the Sawtooth Mountains in the Sawtooth National Recreation Area about 4.5 mi (7.2 km) southeast of Atlanta, Idaho. Sawtooth National Forest trail 484 leads to the lake.

Leggit Lake is at the southern tip of the Sawtooth Wilderness, and a wilderness permit can be obtained at a registration box at trailheads or wilderness boundaries.

== See also ==
- List of lakes of the Sawtooth Mountains (Idaho)
- Sawtooth National Forest
- Sawtooth National Recreation Area
- Sawtooth Range (Idaho)
