= Scenic Lake (Sawtooth Wilderness) =

Alpine lake in the state of Idaho

- Location within Idaho Location within the United States
- Location: Elmore County, Idaho
- Coordinates: 43°53′58″N 115°08′37″W
- Type: Glacial
- Primary outflows: Scenic Creek to Little Queens River to Middle Fork Boise River
- Basin countries: United States
- Max. length: 0.22 mi (0.35 km)
- Max. width: 0.14 mi (0.23 km)
- Surface elevation: 8,398 ft (2,560 m)

Scenic Lake is a small alpine lake in Elmore County, Idaho, United States, located in the Sawtooth Mountains in the Sawtooth National Recreation Area. The lake is accessed from Sawtooth National Forest trail 456 via trail 454 along the Little Queens River.

Scenic Lake is in the Sawtooth Wilderness, and a wilderness permit can be obtained at a registration box at trailheads or wilderness boundaries. Just to the south of Scenic Lake is Nahneke Mountain at 9,564 ft (2,915 m).

== See also ==
- List of lakes of the Sawtooth Mountains (Idaho)
- Sawtooth National Forest
- Sawtooth National Recreation Area
- Sawtooth Range (Idaho)
