= Crooked Lake (Idaho) =

Alpine lake in the state of Idaho

- Location within Idaho Location within the United States
- Location: Custer County, Idaho
- Coordinates: 44°11′44″N 115°03′39″W
- Type: Glacial
- Primary inflows: Crooked Creek
- Primary outflows: Crooked Creek to Salmon River
- Basin countries: United States
- Max. length: 0.09 mi (0.14 km)
- Max. width: 0.06 mi (0.097 km)
- Surface elevation: 8,105 ft (2,470 m)

Crooked Lake is a small alpine lake in Custer County, Idaho, United States, located in the Sawtooth Mountains in the Sawtooth National Recreation Area. There are no trails leading to the lake or the Crooked Creek drainage.

Crooked Lake is in the Sawtooth Wilderness, and a wilderness permit can be obtained at a registration box at trailheads or wilderness boundaries.

== See also ==
- List of lakes of the Sawtooth Mountains (Idaho)
- Sawtooth National Forest
- Sawtooth National Recreation Area
- Sawtooth Range (Idaho)
