= Packrat Lake =

Alpine lake in the state of Idaho

- Location within Idaho Location within the United States
- Location: Boise County, Idaho
- Coordinates: 44°02′42″N 115°03′16″W
- Type: Glacial
- Primary outflows: Goat Creek to South Fork Payette River
- Basin countries: United States
- Max. length: 0.22 mi (0.35 km)
- Max. width: 0.12 mi (0.19 km)
- Surface elevation: 8,656 ft (2,638 m)

Packrat Lake is a small alpine lake in Boise County, Idaho, United States, located in the Sawtooth Mountains in the Sawtooth National Recreation Area. There are no trails leading to the lake or Goat Creek drainage.

Packrat Lake is in the Sawtooth Wilderness, and a wilderness permit can be obtained at a registration box at trailheads or wilderness boundaries. Oreamnus Lake is downstream of Packrat Lake.

== See also ==
- List of lakes of the Sawtooth Mountains (Idaho)
- Sawtooth National Forest
- Sawtooth National Recreation Area
- Sawtooth Range (Idaho)
