= Twin Lakes (Idaho) =

Lake in Blaine County, Idaho

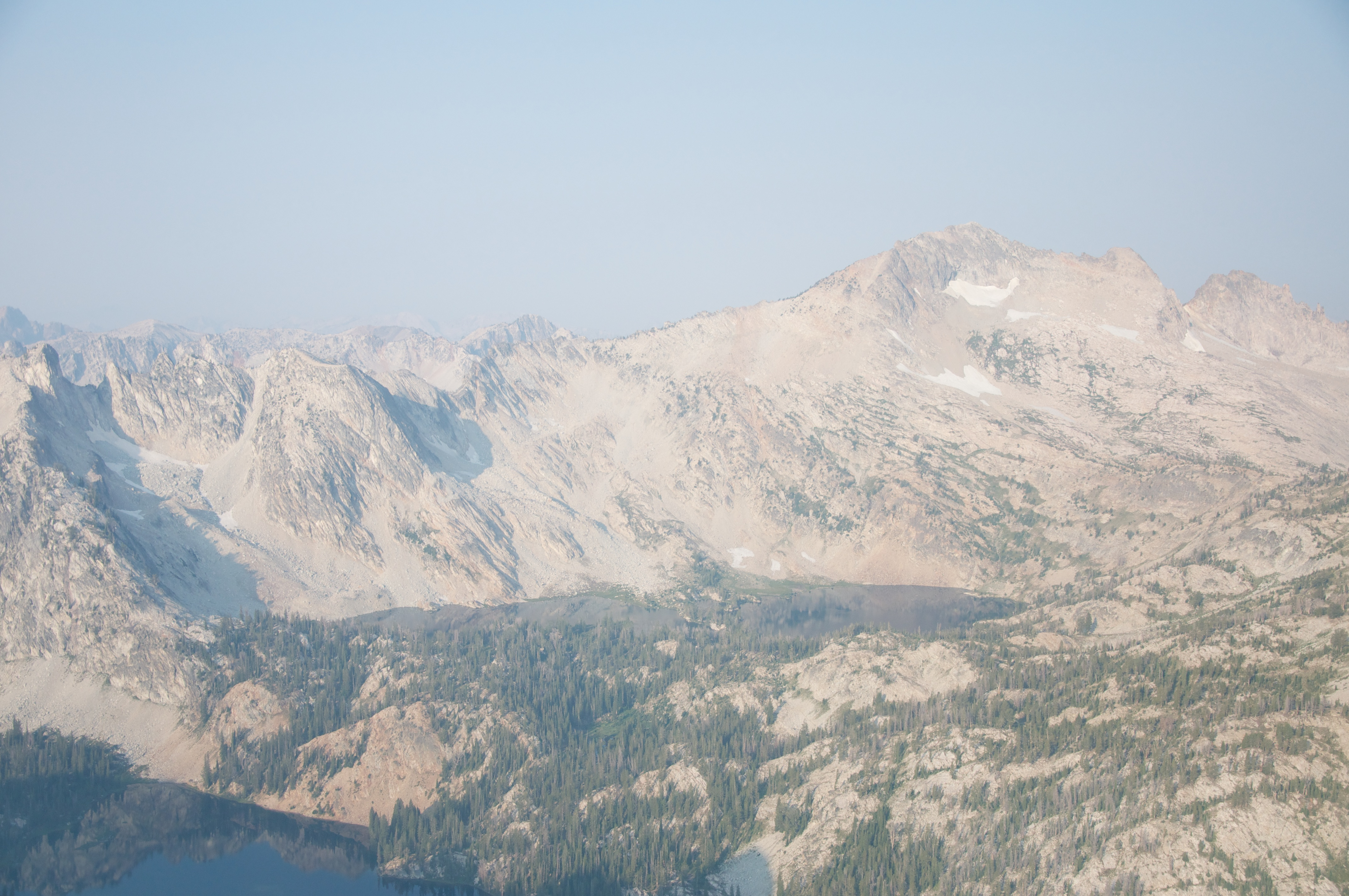
- The Twin Lakes at center with Snowyside Peak

- Location in United States Location in Idaho
- Location: Blaine County, Idaho
- Coordinates: 43.9382374°N 114.9564660°W
- Lake type: Glacial

The Twin Lakes are two adjacent alpine Glacial lakes separated by a narrow strip of land less than 100 ft (30 m) wide in Blaine County, Idaho, United States, located in the Sawtooth Mountains in the Sawtooth National Recreation Area. The lakes eventually flow into the Salmon River. Sawtooth National Forest trail 092 leads to the twin lakes.

== Description ==
The Twin Lakes are in the Sawtooth Wilderness, and a wilderness permit can be obtained at a registration box at trailheads or wilderness boundaries. The lakes are just upstream of Alice Lake and several miles upstream of Pettit Lake.

Twin Lakes
| Lake | Elevation | Max. length | Max. width | Location |
|---|---|---|---|---|
| South Twin Lake | 2,699 m (8,855 ft) | 461 m (1,512 ft) | 338 m (1,109 ft) | 43.936242°N 114.955422°W |
| North Twin Lake | 2,700 m (8,900 ft) | 451 m (1,480 ft) | 430 m (1,410 ft) | 43.939819°N 114.957256°W |

== See also ==
- List of lakes of the Sawtooth Mountains (Idaho)
- Sawtooth National Forest
- Sawtooth National Recreation Area
- Sawtooth Range (Idaho)
