= McWillards Lake =

Alpine lake in the state of Idaho

- Location within Idaho Location within the United States
- Location: Boise County, Idaho
- Coordinates: 44°03′25″N 115°03′48″W
- Type: Glacial
- Primary outflows: Goat Creek to South Fork Payette River
- Basin countries: United States
- Max. length: 0.12 mi (0.19 km)
- Max. width: 0.05 mi (0.080 km)
- Surface elevation: 8,195 ft (2,498 m)

McWillards Lake is a small alpine lake in Boise County, Idaho, United States, located in the Sawtooth Mountains in the Sawtooth National Recreation Area. There are no trails leading to the lake or the Goat Creek drainage.

McWillards Lake is in the Sawtooth Wilderness, and a wilderness permit can be obtained at a registration box at trailheads or wilderness boundaries.

== See also ==
- List of lakes of the Sawtooth Mountains (Idaho)
- Sawtooth National Forest
- Sawtooth National Recreation Area
- Sawtooth Range (Idaho)
