= Pancho Lake =

Alpine lake in Elmore County

- Location within Idaho Location within the United States
- Location: Elmore County, Idaho
- Coordinates: 43°56′17″N 115°04′49″W
- Type: Glacial
- Primary outflows: Rock Creek to Middle Fork Boise River
- Basin countries: United States
- Max. length: 0.11 mi (0.18 km)
- Max. width: 0.05 mi (0.080 km)
- Surface elevation: 8,915 ft (2,717 m)

Pancho Lake is a small alpine lake in Elmore County, Idaho, United States, located in the Sawtooth Mountains in the Sawtooth National Recreation Area. The lake is accessed from Sawtooth National Forest trail 479 along Rock Creek or 458 along the Queens River.

Pancho Lake is in the Sawtooth Wilderness, and a wilderness permit can be obtained at a registration box at trailheads or wilderness boundaries.

== See also ==
- List of lakes of the Sawtooth Mountains (Idaho)
- Sawtooth National Forest
- Sawtooth National Recreation Area
- Sawtooth Range (Idaho)
