= Toxaway Lake (Idaho) =

Lake in Idaho, US

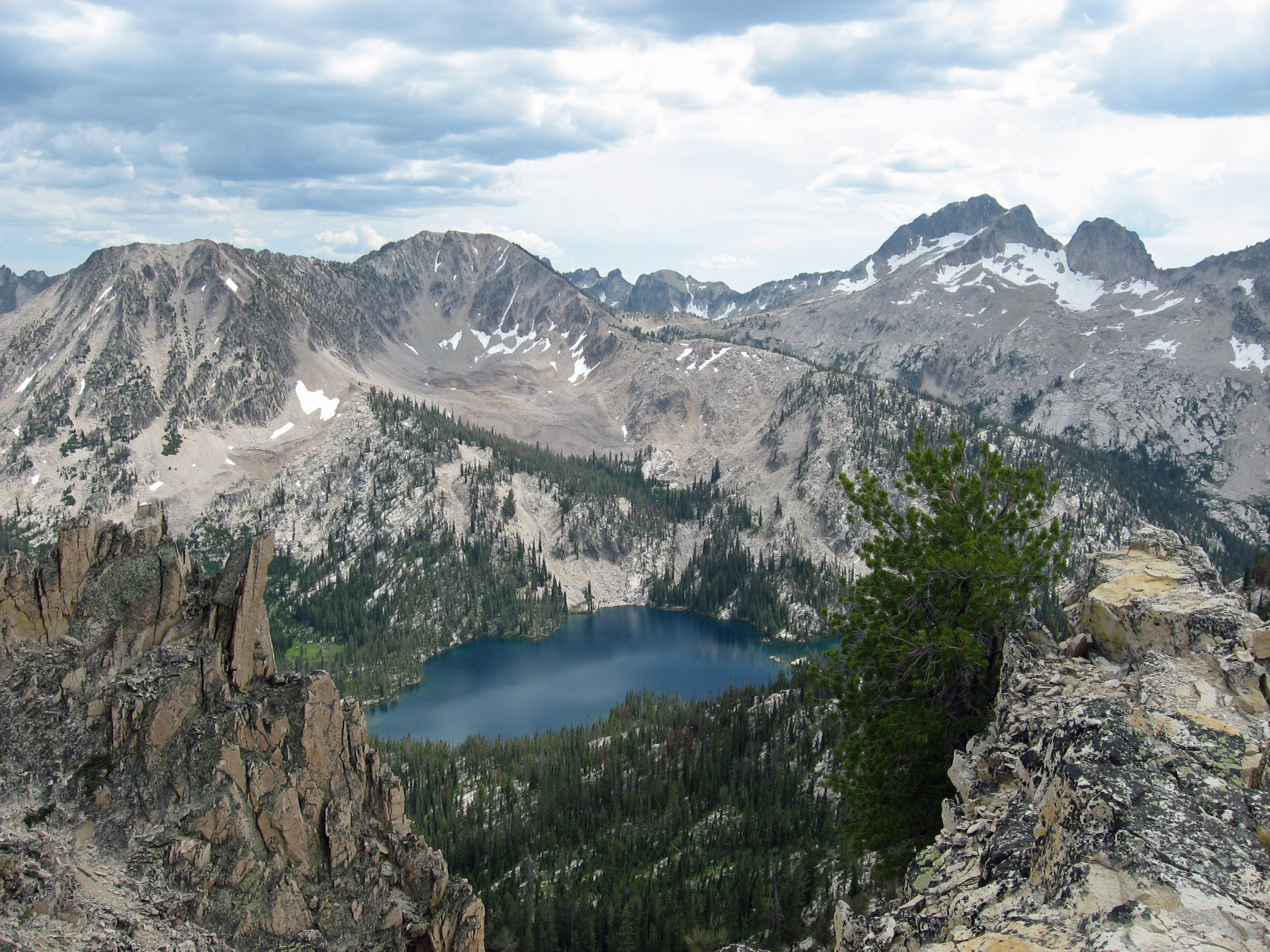
- Toxaway Lake from Sand Mountain Pass

- Location within Idaho Location within the United States
- Location: Custer County, Idaho
- Coordinates: 43°58′N 114°58′W
- Type: Glacial
- Primary outflows: Creek to Salmon River
- Basin countries: United States
- Max. length: 0.92 mi (1.48 km)
- Max. width: 0.36 mi (0.58 km)
- Surface elevation: 8,323 ft (2,537 m)
- Islands: 2

Toxaway Lake is an alpine lake in the western United States, in Custer County, Idaho. Located high in the Sawtooth Mountains in the Sawtooth National Recreation Area, it is approximately 17 miles (27 km) south of Stanley. The lake's surface elevation is 8,323 ft (2,537 m) above sea level.

A trail from the Yellow Belly Lake and Pettit Lake trailheads leads towards Toxaway Lake via Farley Lake. These trailheads can be accessed from State Highway 75 via Sawtooth National Forest road 208.

Toxaway Lake is in the Sawtooth Wilderness and wilderness permit can be obtained at trailheads. Campfires in this section of the Sawtooth Wilderness are prohibited due to heavy use and limited firewood.

== See also ==
- List of lakes of the Sawtooth Mountains (Idaho)
- Sawtooth National Forest
- Sawtooth National Recreation Area
- Sawtooth Range (Idaho)
