= Bluebox Lake =

Alpine lake in Boise County, Idaho, United States

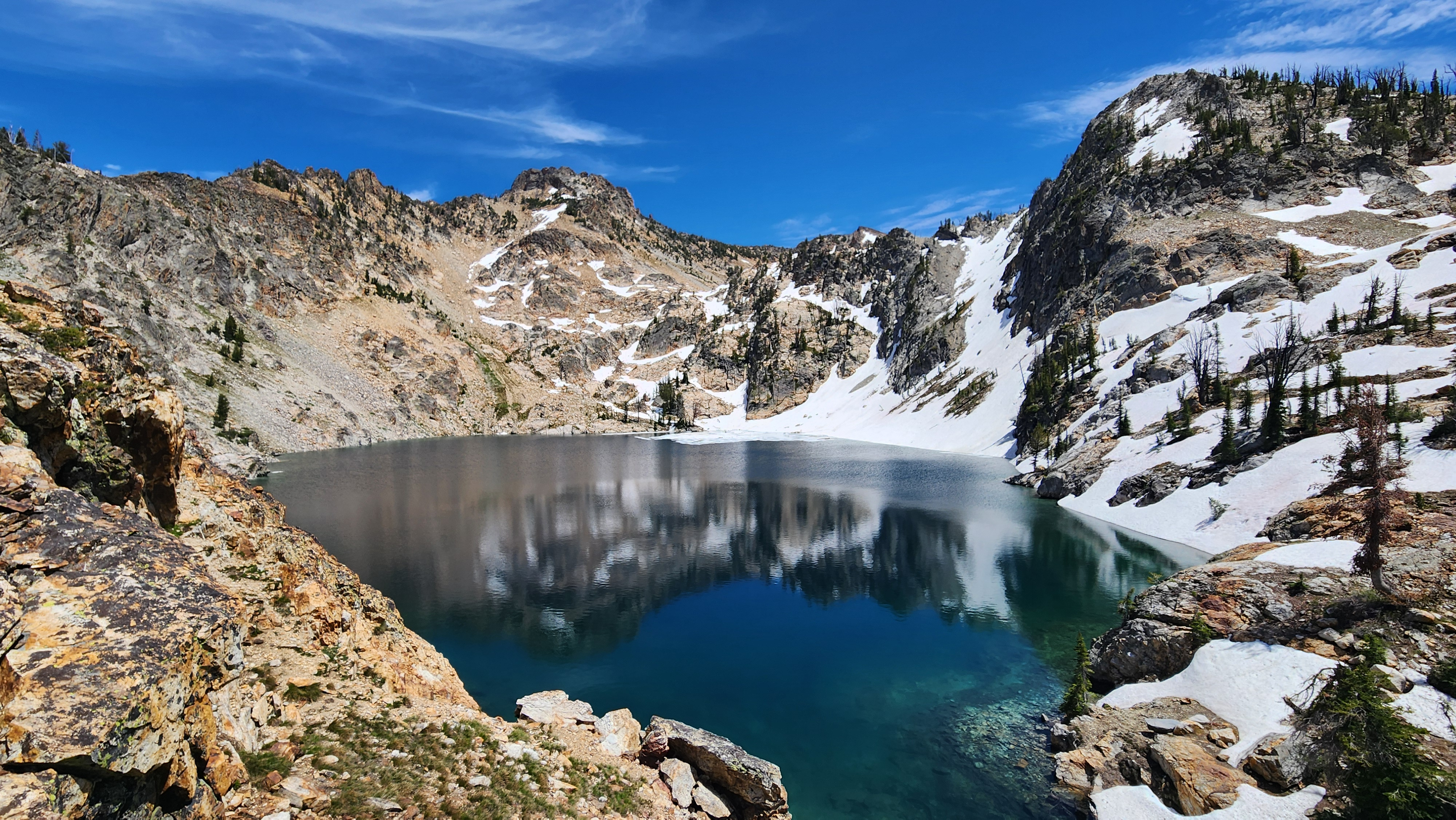
- Bluebox Lake from above

- Location within Idaho Location within the United States
- Location: Boise County, Idaho
- Coordinates: 44°09′26″N 115°02′14″W
- Lake type: Glacial
- Primary outflows: North Fork Baron Creek to South Fork Payette River
- Basin countries: United States
- Max. length: 0.22 mi (0.35 km)
- Max. width: 0.15 mi (0.24 km)
- Surface elevation: 8,790 ft (2,680 m)

Bluebox Lake is a small alpine lake in Boise County, Idaho, United States, located in the Sawtooth Mountains in the Sawtooth National Recreation Area.

== See also ==
- List of lakes of the Sawtooth Mountains (Idaho)
- Sawtooth National Forest
- Sawtooth National Recreation Area
- Sawtooth Range (Idaho)
