= Cony Lake =

Lake in Boise County, Idaho, United States

- Location within Idaho Location within the United States
- Location: Boise County, Idaho
- Coordinates: 44°03′42″N 115°05′01″W
- Lake type: Glacial
- Primary inflows: Goat Creek
- Primary outflows: Goat Creek to South Fork Payette River
- Basin countries: United States
- Max. length: 0.21 mi (0.34 km)
- Max. width: 0.11 mi (0.18 km)
- Surface elevation: 8,769 ft (2,673 m)

Cony Lake is a small alpine lake in Boise County, Idaho, United States, located in the Sawtooth Mountains in the Sawtooth National Recreation Area. There are no trails leading to the lake or the Goat Creek drainage.

Cony Lake is in the Sawtooth Wilderness, and a wilderness permit can be obtained at a registration box at trailheads or wilderness boundaries.

== See also ==
- List of lakes of the Sawtooth Mountains (Idaho)
- Sawtooth National Forest
