= Lower Bead Lake =

Alpine lake in the state of Idaho

- Location within Idaho Location within the United States
- Location: Boise County, Idaho
- Coordinates: 44°04′19″N 115°03′10″W
- Type: Glacial
- Primary inflows: Goat Creek
- Primary outflows: Goat Creek to South Fork Payette River
- Basin countries: United States
- Max. length: 0.10 mi (0.16 km)
- Max. width: 0.06 mi (0.097 km)
- Surface elevation: 8,556 ft (2,608 m)

Lower Bead Lake is a small alpine lake in Boise County, Idaho, United States, located in the Sawtooth Mountains in the Sawtooth National Recreation Area. There are no trails leading to the lake or the Goat Creek drainage.

Lower Bead Lake is in the Sawtooth Wilderness, and a wilderness permit can be obtained at a registration box at trailheads or wilderness boundaries. The lake is downstream of Upper Bead Lake.

== See also ==
- List of lakes of the Sawtooth Mountains (Idaho)
- Sawtooth National Forest
- Sawtooth National Recreation Area
- Sawtooth Range (Idaho)
