= Alpine Lake (Central Sawtooth Wilderness) =

Alpine lake in the state of Idaho

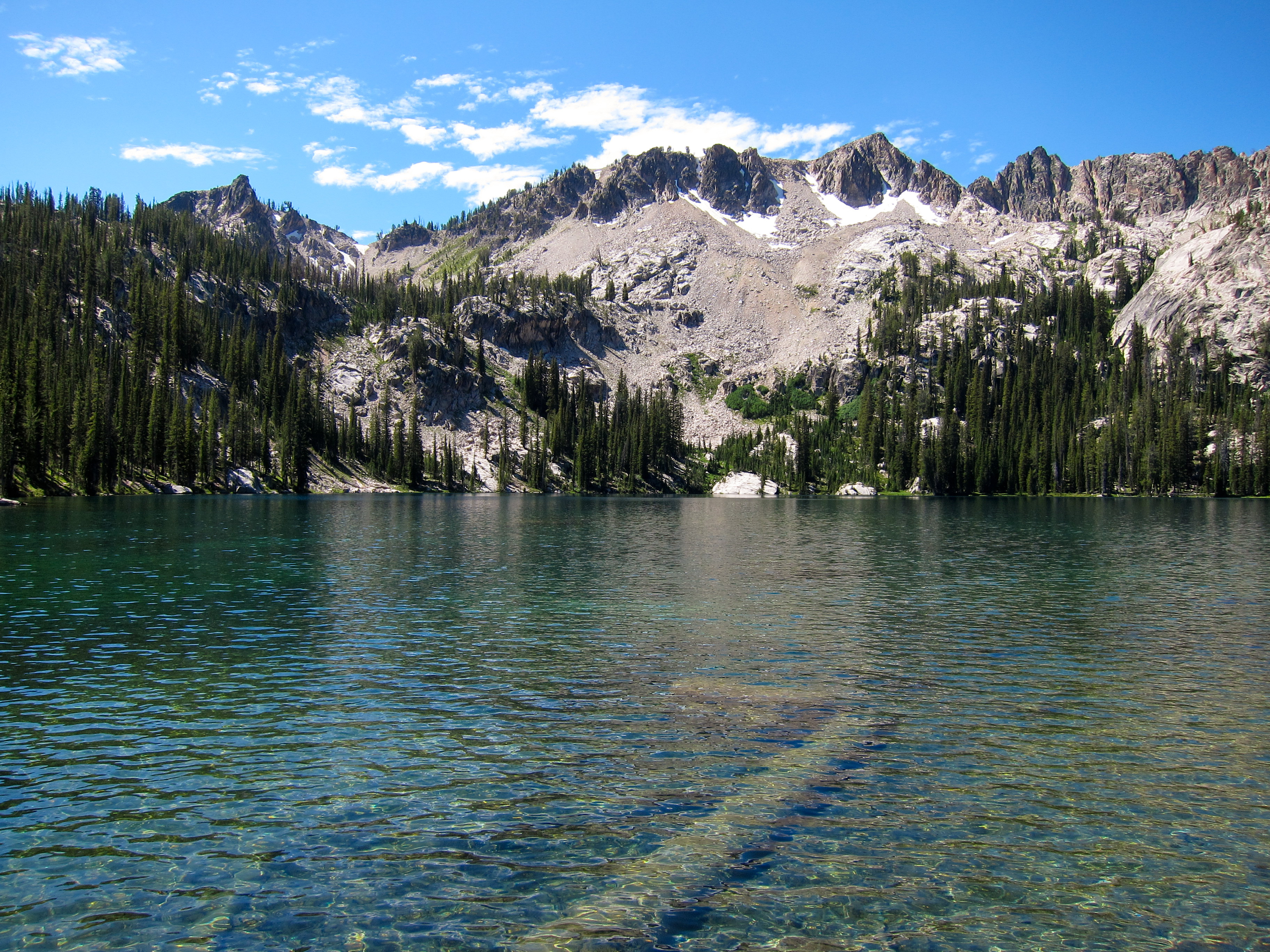
- Alpine Lake

- Location within Idaho Location within the United States
- Location: Custer County, Idaho
- Coordinates: 44°03′53″N 115°01′21″W
- Type: Glacial
- Primary outflows: Unnamed creek to Redfish Lake Creek to Salmon River
- Basin countries: United States
- Max. length: 0.30 mi (0.48 km)
- Max. width: 0.20 mi (0.32 km)
- Surface elevation: 8,337 ft (2,541 m)

Alpine Lake is an alpine lake in Custer County, Idaho, United States, located high in the Sawtooth Mountains in the Sawtooth National Recreation Area. The lake is approximately 11.4 miles (18.3 km) southwest of Stanley.

A trail from the Redfish Lake Creek trailhead and campground at the southwestern end of Redfish Lake lead about 5 miles (8.0 km) along Redfish Creek to an intersection with a trail that leads up to Alpine Lake. The Redfish Lake trailhead can be accessed from State Highway 75 via Sawtooth National Forest road 214. The surface elevation of the lake is 6,513 feet (1,985 m) above sea level. To reach the Redfish Creek trailhead you can either hike around either side of Redfish Lake or take a boat across and save several miles of hiking.

With a surface elevation of 8,337 feet (2,541 m) above sea level, Alpine Lake can remain frozen into early summer. At the southwestern end of the lake is Packrat Peak at 10,240 feet (3,120 m) in elevation.

Alpine Lake is in the Sawtooth Wilderness and wilderness permit can be obtained at trailheads.

== See also ==
- List of lakes of the Sawtooth Mountains (Idaho)
- Sawtooth National Forest
- Sawtooth National Recreation Area
- Sawtooth Range (Idaho)
