= Bench Lakes (Idaho) =

Alpine lakes in the state of Idaho

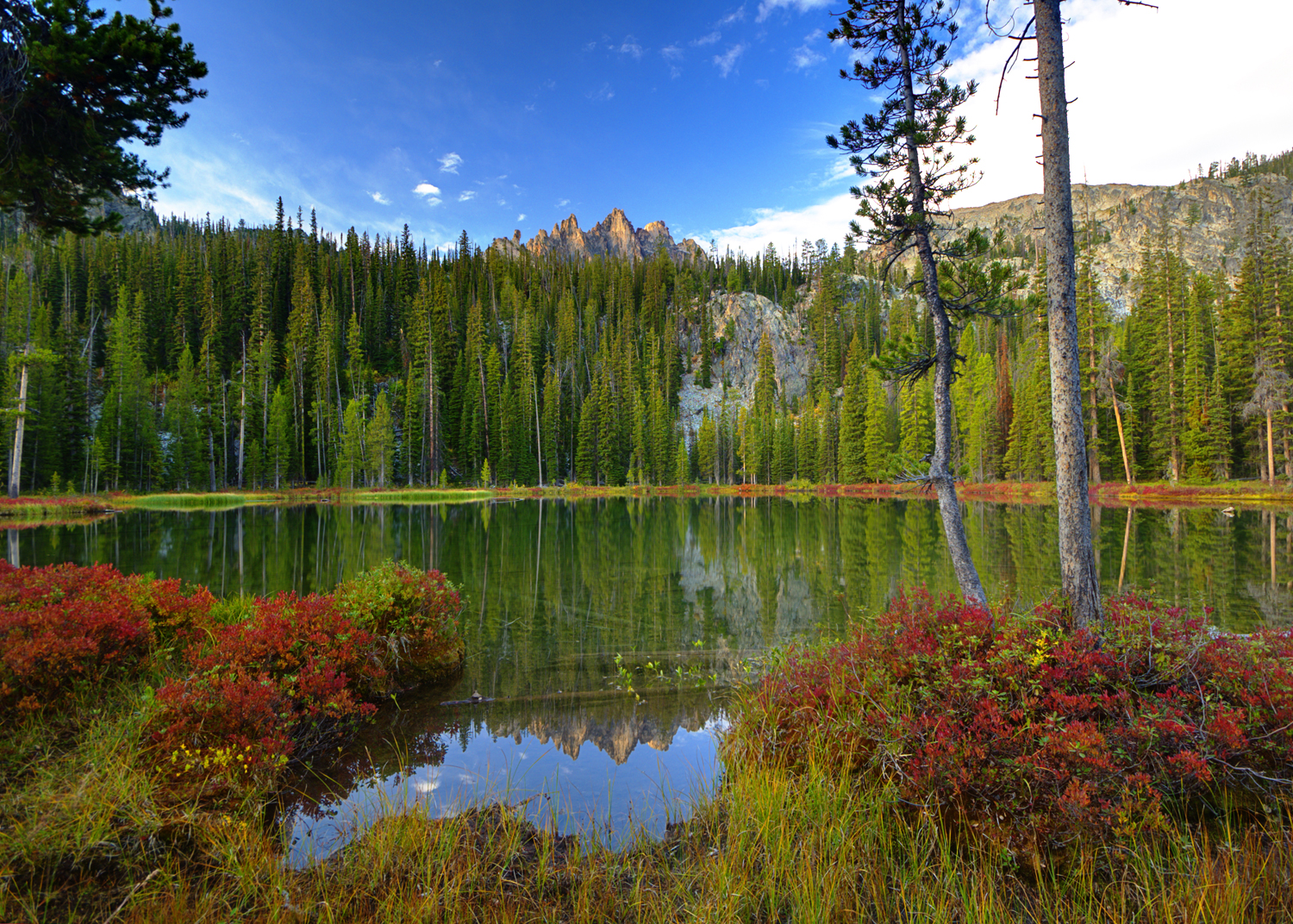
- Bench Lake 3

- Location within Idaho Location within the United States
- Location: Sawtooth Mountains; Custer County, Idaho
- Coordinates: 44.1096°N 114.9659°W
- Type: Glacial lakes
- Part of: Sawtooth Wilderness
- Basin countries: United States
- Managing agency: U.S. Forest Service
- Max. length: 110–465 m (361–1,526 ft)
- Max. width: 95–295 m (312–968 ft)
- Surface elevation: 2,362–2,632 m (7,749–8,635 ft)
- Sections/sub-basins: 5

The Bench Lakes are a chain of five small alpine glacial lakes in Custer County, Idaho, United States, located in the Sawtooth Mountains in the Sawtooth National Recreation Area. A cutoff from Sawtooth National Forest trail 101 along Redfish Lake leads to the Bench Lakes. The lakes are drained by an unnamed stream that flows into Redfish Lake, Redfish Lake Creek, and eventually the Salmon River.

The Bench Lakes are in the Sawtooth Wilderness, and a wilderness permit can be obtained at a registration box at trailheads or wilderness boundaries. The uppermost Bench Lake is at the northeastern base of Mount Heyburn.

== Bench Lakes Fire ==
In July 2024, the area nearest to the lakes and Redfish Lake were the site of the Bench Lake Fire. The fire, which burned approximately 2,595 acres (1,050 ha), was determined to be "human-caused."

Bench Lakes
Lake	Elevation	Max. length	Max. width	Location
Bench Lake 1	2,362 m (7,749 ft)	190 m (620 ft)	160 m (520 ft)	44.117031°N 114.950625°W
Bench Lake 2	2,363 m (7,753 ft)	465 m (1,526 ft)	240 m (790 ft)	44.116365°N 114.955179°W
Bench Lake 3	2,414 m (7,920 ft)	110 m (360 ft)	095 m (312 ft)	44.113772°N 114.963439°W
Bench Lake 4	2,496 m (8,189 ft)	435 m (1,427 ft)	295 m (968 ft)	44.109683°N 114.965717°W
Bench Lake 5	2,632 m (8,635 ft)	400 m (1,300 ft)	210 m (690 ft)	44.106147°N 114.973569°W

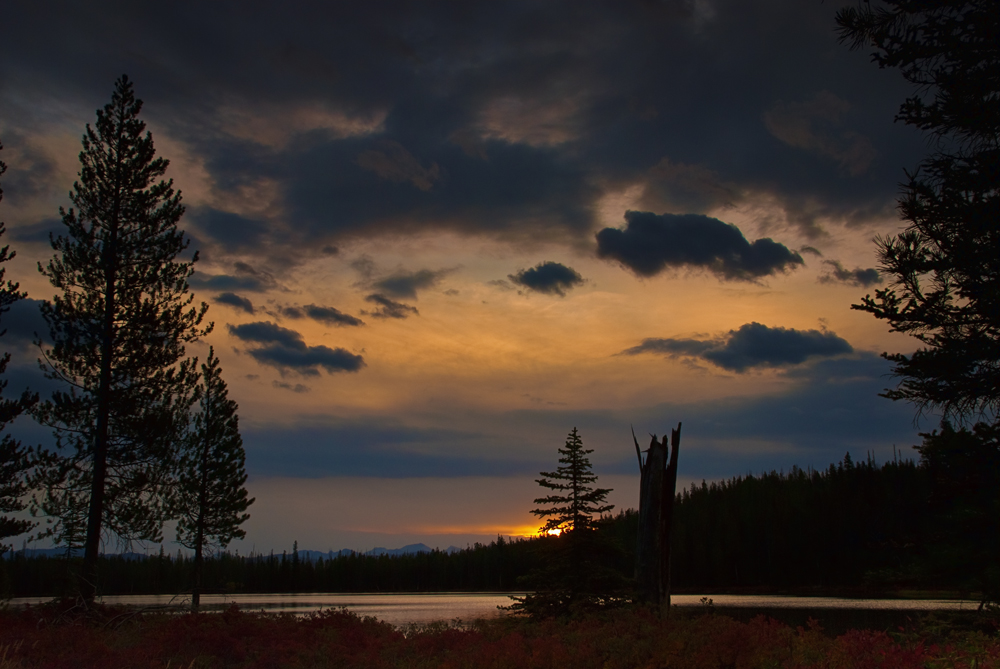
Lower Bench Lake at sunrise

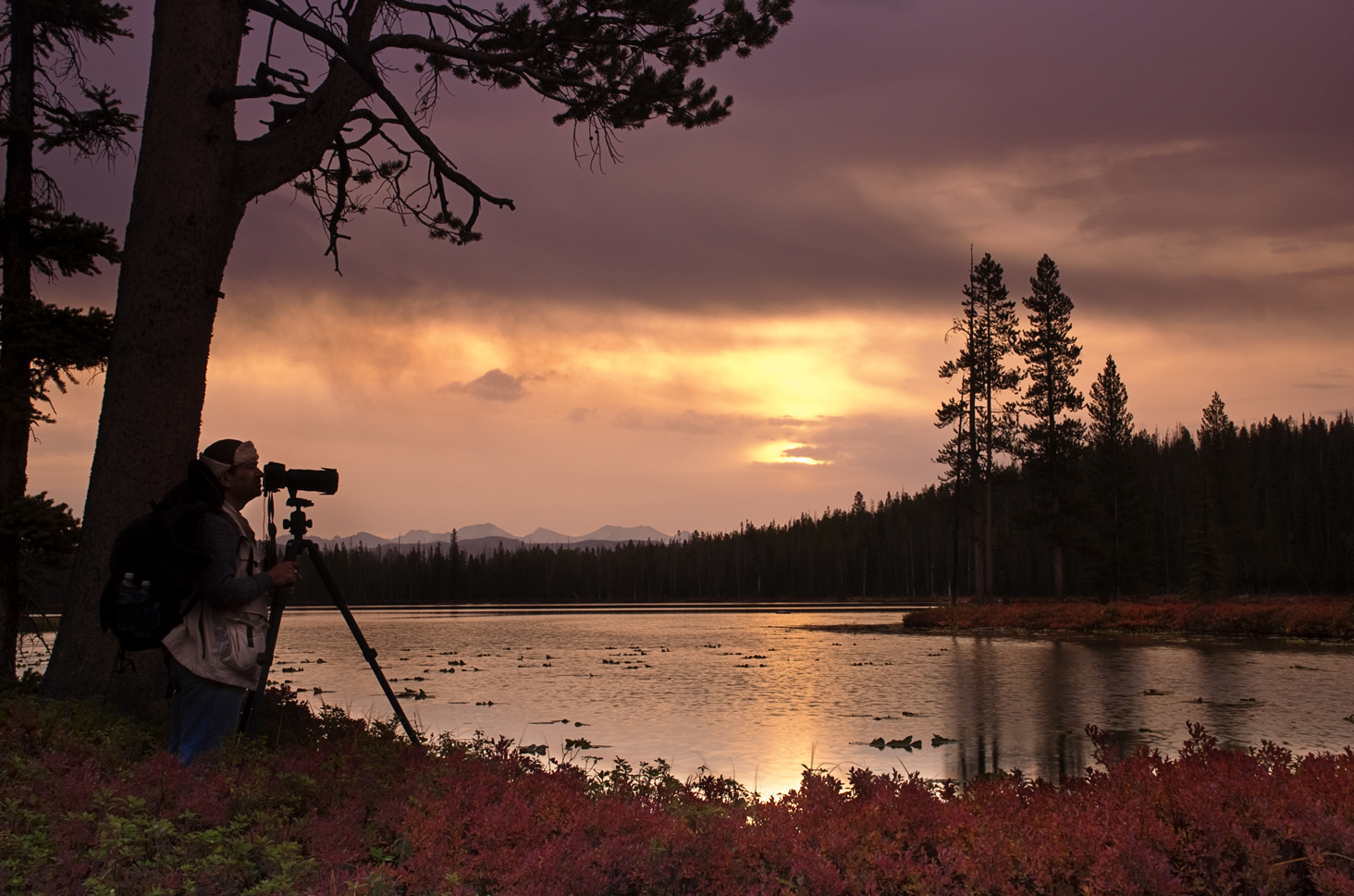
One of the Bench Lakes at sunrise

== See also ==
- List of lakes of the Sawtooth Mountains (Idaho)
- Sawtooth National Forest
- Sawtooth National Recreation Area
- Sawtooth Range (Idaho)
