= Saddleback Lakes =

Alpine lakes in the state of Idaho

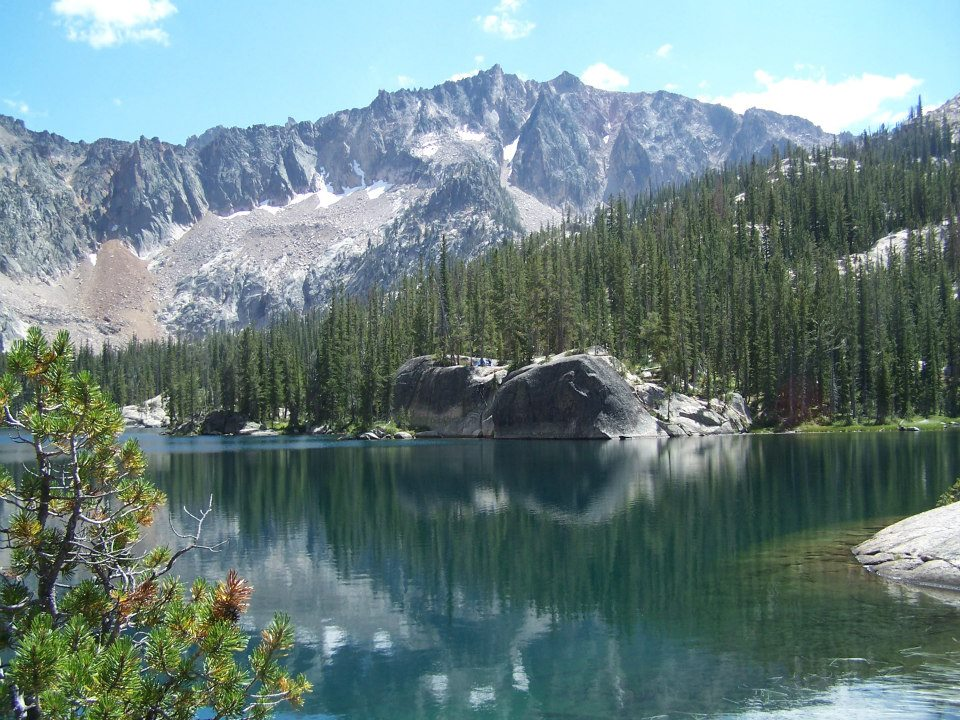
Saddleback Lake in the Sawtooth Wilderness of Idaho, United States

The Saddleback Lakes are a chain of small alpine glacial lakes in Custer County, Idaho, United States, located in the Sawtooth Mountains in the Sawtooth National Recreation Area. The lakes are drained by an unnamed tributary of Redfish Lake Creek, which flows into the Salmon River. There are no trails that lead to the lakes, although they are most easily accessed from Sawtooth National Forest trail 154.

The Saddleback Lakes are in the Sawtooth Wilderness, and a wilderness permit can be obtained at a registration box at trailheads or wilderness boundaries. The mountain known as Elephants Perch is to the north of the lakes.

Saddleback Lakes
Lake	Elevation	Max. length	Max. width	Location
Saddleback Lake 1	2,545 m (8,350 ft)	435 m (1,427 ft)	256 m (840 ft)	44.063853°N 114.971986°W
Saddleback Lake 2	2,612 m (8,570 ft)	050 m (160 ft)	030 m (98 ft)	44.062867°N 114.976753°W
Saddleback Lake 3	2,558 m (8,392 ft)	322 m (1,056 ft)	130 m (430 ft)	44.062867°N 114.976753°W
Saddleback Lake 4	2,718 m (8,917 ft)	128 m (420 ft)	047 m (154 ft)	44.057347°N 114.9616°W
Saddleback Lake 5	2,717 m (8,914 ft)	195 m (640 ft)	129 m (423 ft)	44.057389°N 114.959925°W

== See also ==
- List of lakes of the Sawtooth Mountains (Idaho)
- Sawtooth National Forest
- Sawtooth National Recreation Area
- Sawtooth Range (Idaho)
