= Dandy Lake =

Lake in Idaho, United States

- Location within Idaho Location within the United States
- Location: Elmore County, Idaho
- Coordinates: 43°55′02″N 115°05′12″W
- Lake type: Glacial
- Primary outflows: Rock Creek to Middle Fork Boise River
- Basin countries: United States
- Max. length: 0.18 mi (0.29 km)
- Max. width: 0.07 mi (0.11 km)
- Surface elevation: 8,510 ft (2,590 m)

Dandy Lake is a small alpine lake in Elmore County, Idaho, United States, located in the Sawtooth Mountains in the Sawtooth National Recreation Area. The lake is accessed from Sawtooth National Forest trail 479 along Rock Creek.

Dandy Lake is in the Sawtooth Wilderness, and a wilderness permit can be obtained at a registration box at trailheads or wilderness boundaries.

== See also ==
- List of lakes of the Sawtooth Mountains (Idaho)
- Sawtooth National Forest
- Sawtooth National Recreation Area
- Sawtooth Range (Idaho)
