= Upper Bead Lake =

Alpine lake in the state of Idaho

- Location within Idaho Location within the United States
- Location: Boise County, Idaho
- Coordinates: 44°04′13″N 115°03′02″W
- Type: Glacial
- Primary inflows: Goat Creek
- Primary outflows: Goat Creek to South Fork Payette River
- Basin countries: United States
- Max. length: 0.07 mi (0.11 km)
- Max. width: 0.07 mi (0.11 km)
- Surface elevation: 8,710 ft (2,650 m)
- Islands: 1

Upper Bead Lake is a small alpine lake in Boise County, Idaho, United States, lies within the Sawtooth Mountains in the Sawtooth National Recreation Area. There are no trails leading to the lake or the Goat Creek drainage.

Upper Bead Lake is in the Sawtooth Wilderness, and a wilderness permit can be obtained at a registration boxes located at trailheads or wilderness boundaries. There is one large boulder that forms the lake’s only island. Upper Bead Lake is upstream of Lower Bead Lake.

== See also ==
- List of lakes of the Sawtooth Mountains (Idaho)
- Sawtooth National Forest
- Sawtooth National Recreation Area
- Sawtooth Range (Idaho)
