= Browns Lake (Idaho) =

Glacial lake in Elmore County, Idaho

- Location within Idaho Location within the United States
- Location: Elmore County, Idaho
- Coordinates: 43°55′55″N 115°08′40″W
- Lake type: Glacial
- Primary outflows: Little Queens River to Middle Fork Boise River
- Basin countries: United States
- Max. length: 0.30 mi (0.48 km)
- Max. width: 0.16 mi (0.26 km)
- Surface elevation: 8,290 ft (2,530 m)

Browns Lake is a small alpine lake in Elmore County, Idaho, United States, located in the Sawtooth Mountains in the Sawtooth National Recreation Area. Sawtooth National Forest trail 480 travels along the Little Queens River from the intersection of trails 454 and 459 directly to Browns Lake.

Browns Lake is in the Sawtooth Wilderness, and a wilderness permit can be obtained at a registration box at trailheads or wilderness boundaries.

== See also ==
- List of lakes of the Sawtooth Mountains (Idaho)
- Sawtooth National Forest
- Sawtooth National Recreation Area
- Sawtooth Range (Idaho)
