= Camp Lake (Idaho) =

Lake in Idaho, USA

- Location within Idaho Location within the United States
- Location: Elmore County, Idaho
- Coordinates: 43.938556°N 115.003792°W
- Lake type: Glacial
- Primary outflows: Flytrip Creek to Middle Fork Boise River
- Basin countries: United States
- Max. length: 0.15 mi (0.24 km)
- Max. width: 0.06 mi (0.097 km)
- Surface elevation: 8,525 ft (2,598 m)

Camp Lake is a small alpine lake in Elmore County, Idaho, United States, located in the Sawtooth Mountains in the Sawtooth National Recreation Area. Sawtooth National Forest trail 461 leads to the lake.

Camp Lake is in the Sawtooth Wilderness, and a wilderness permit can be obtained at a registration box at trailheads or wilderness boundaries.

== See also ==
- List of lakes of the Sawtooth Mountains (Idaho)
- Sawtooth National Forest
- Sawtooth National Recreation Area
- Sawtooth Range (Idaho)
