= Pulpit Lake =

Alpine lake in the state of Idaho

- Location within Idaho Location within the United States
- Location: Custer County, Idaho
- Coordinates: 44°12′46″N 115°04′12″W
- Type: Glacial
- Primary outflows: Creek to Stanley Lake Creek to Salmon River
- Basin countries: United States
- Max. length: 0.10 mi (0.16 km)
- Max. width: 0.04 mi (0.064 km)
- Surface elevation: 8,595 ft (2,620 m)

Pulpit Lake is a small alpine lake in Custer County, Idaho, United States, located in the Sawtooth Mountains in the Sawtooth National Recreation Area. There are no trails leading to the lake or its drainage. Cross country access to Pulpit Lake and the Cradle Canyon area is from the high point of the Alpine Way Trail between Crooked Creek and Stanley Lake.

Pulpit Lake is in the Sawtooth Wilderness, and a wilderness permit can be obtained at a registration box at trailheads or wilderness boundaries. The lake is just to the southeast of McGowan Peak and upstream of Stanley Lake.

== See also ==
- List of lakes of the Sawtooth Mountains (Idaho)
- Sawtooth National Forest
- Sawtooth National Recreation Area
- Sawtooth Range (Idaho)
