= Marshall Lake (Idaho) =

Alpine lake in the state of Idaho

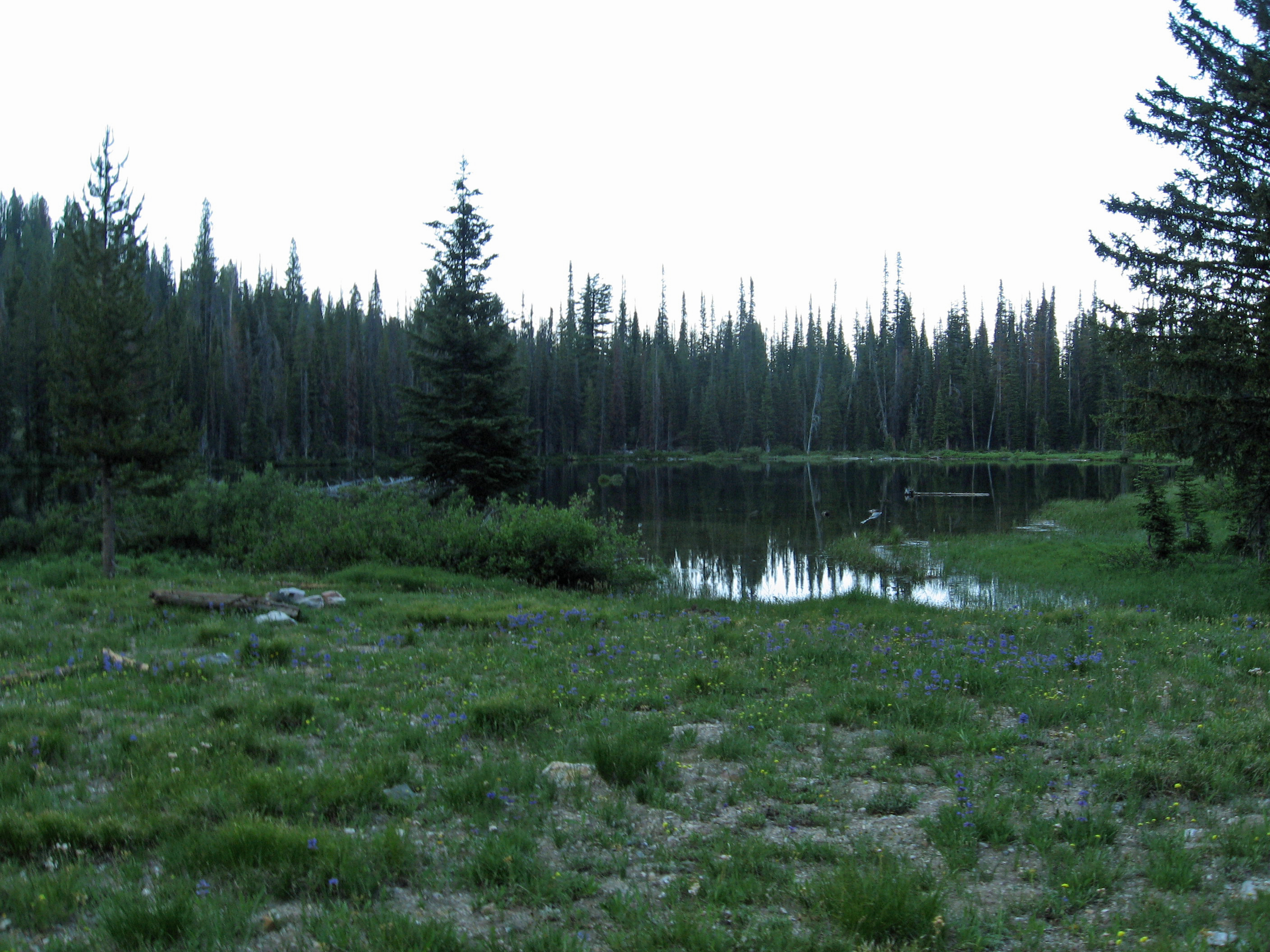
- Marshall Lake

- Location within Idaho Location within the United States
- Location: Custer County, Idaho
- Coordinates: 44°09′30″N 114°59′11″W
- Type: Glacial
- Primary inflows: Meadow Creek
- Primary outflows: Meadow Creek to Salmon River
- Basin countries: United States
- Max. length: 0.11 mi (0.18 km)
- Max. width: 0.09 mi (0.14 km)
- Surface elevation: 7,720 ft (2,350 m)

Marshall Lake is a small alpine lake in Custer County, Idaho, United States, located in the Sawtooth Mountains in the Sawtooth National Recreation Area. Sawtooth National Forest trail 528 (Alpine Way trail) leads directly to Marshall Lake. The lakes is most easily accessed from the Redfish Lake or Stanley Ranger Station trailheads.

Marshall Lake is in the Sawtooth Wilderness, and a wilderness permit can be obtained at a registration box at trailheads or wilderness boundaries. The lakes sits just to the east of Williams and Merritt Peaks.

== See also ==
- List of lakes of the Sawtooth Mountains (Idaho)
- Sawtooth National Forest
- Sawtooth National Recreation Area
- Sawtooth Range (Idaho)
