= McDonald Lake (Idaho) =

Lake in Idaho, USA

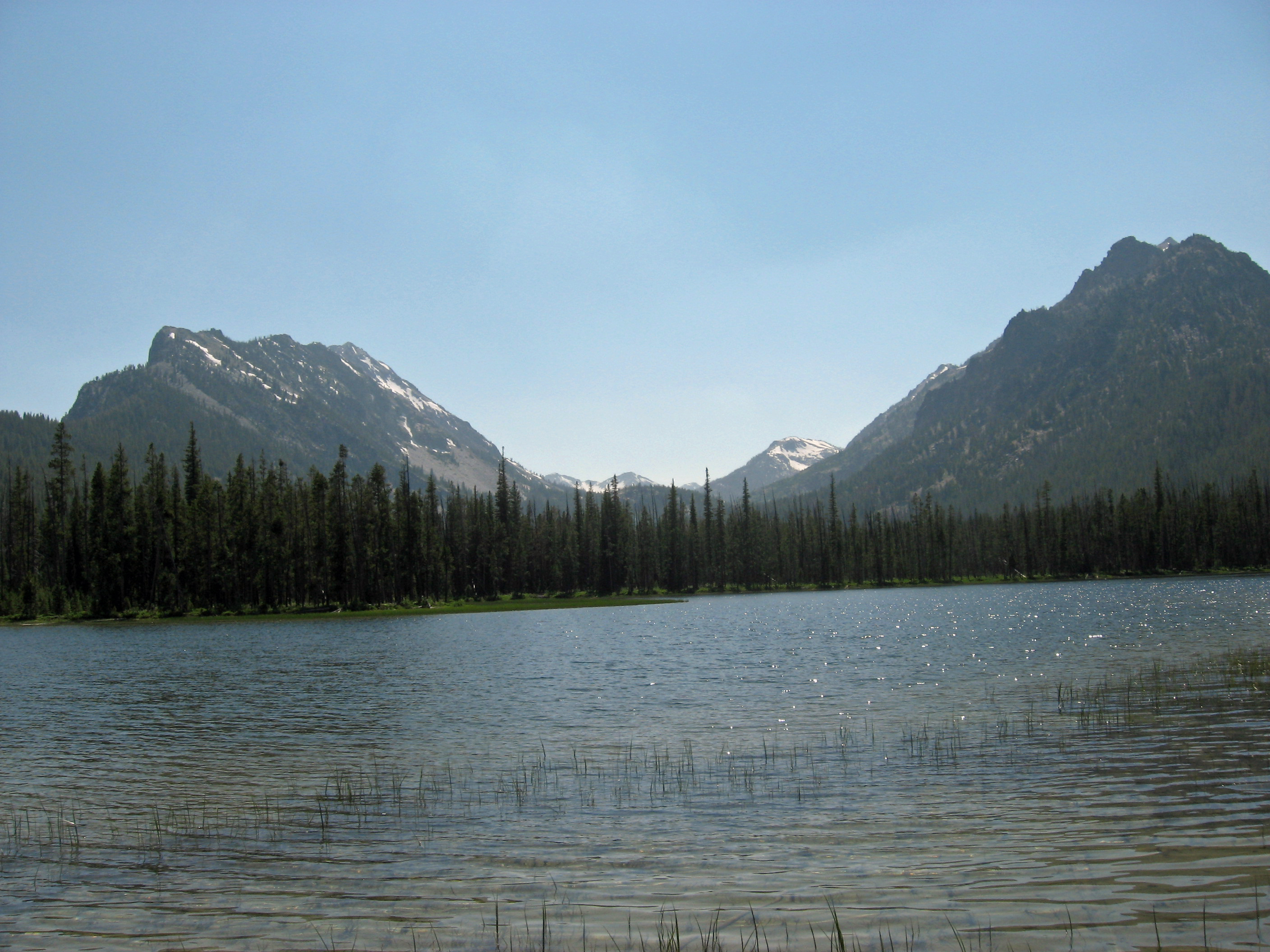
- McDonald Lake

- Location within Idaho Location within the United States
- Location: Custer County, Idaho
- Coordinates: 43°59′53″N 114°53′22″W
- Type: Glacial
- Primary outflows: Creek to Salmon River
- Basin countries: United States
- Max. length: 0.28 mi (0.45 km)
- Max. width: 0.17 mi (0.27 km)
- Surface elevation: 7,097 ft (2,163 m)

McDonald Lake is a small alpine lake in Custer County, Idaho, United States, located in the Sawtooth Valley in the Sawtooth National Recreation Area. The lake is approximately 15 miles (24 km) south of Stanley and 34 miles (55 km) northwest of Ketchum. The lake is very shallow and about half of it is a shallow wetland due to sedimentation.

McDonald Lake can be accessed from State Highway 75 via Sawtooth National Forest road 205 and 096. Forest road 096 is a high clearance road that goes directly to a trailhead and campground on the shores of Yellow Belly Lake, which is just downstream of McDonald Lake.

== See also ==
- List of lakes of the Sawtooth Mountains (Idaho)
- Sawtooth National Forest
- Sawtooth National Recreation Area
- Sawtooth Range (Idaho)
