= Lily Lake (Idaho) =

Alpine lake in the state of Idaho

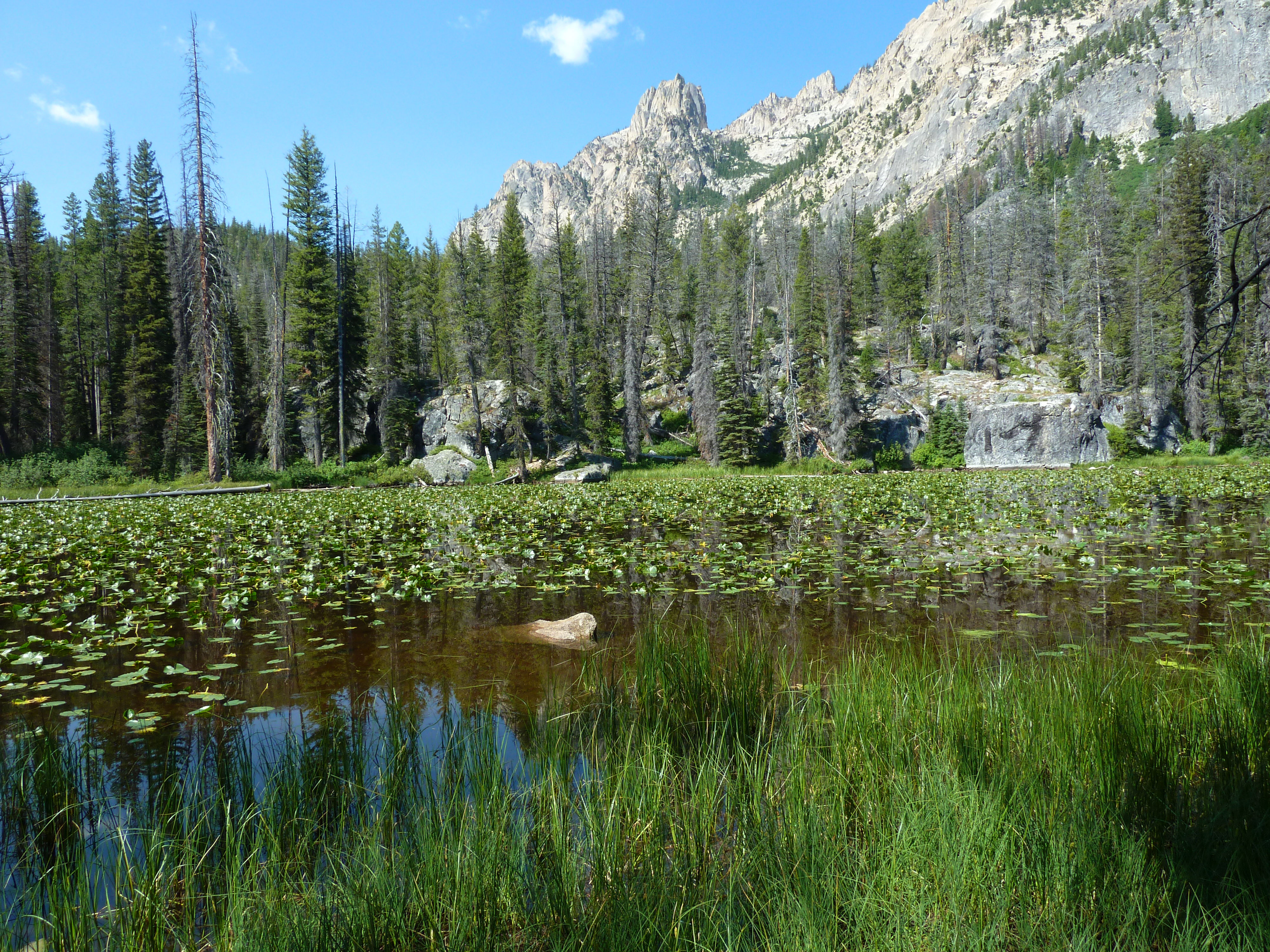

- Location within Idaho Location within the United States
- Location: Custer County, Idaho
- Coordinates: 44°05′49″N 114°57′29″W
- Type: Glacial
- Primary outflows: Redfish Lake Creek to Salmon River
- Basin countries: United States
- Max. length: 0.04 mi (0.064 km)
- Max. width: 0.04 mi (0.064 km)
- Surface elevation: 6,755 ft (2,059 m)

Lily Lake is a small alpine lake in Custer County, Idaho, United States, located in the Sawtooth Mountains in the Sawtooth National Recreation Area. The lake is just upstream of Redfish Lake and is named from the many water lilies that cover its surface. There is a trail leading from the southwest end of Redfish Lake to Lily Lake.

Lily Lake is in the Sawtooth Wilderness, and a wilderness permit can be obtained at a registration box at trailheads or wilderness boundaries.

== See also ==
- List of lakes of the Sawtooth Mountains (Idaho)
- Sawtooth National Forest
- Sawtooth National Recreation Area
- Sawtooth Range (Idaho)
