= Alidade Lake =

Alpine lake in the state of Idaho

- Location within Idaho Location within the United States
- Location: Elmore County, Idaho, United States
- Coordinates: 43°57′40″N 115°09′55″W
- Type: Glacial
- Primary inflows: Alidade Creek
- Primary outflows: Alidade Creek to Johnson Creek to Middle Fork Boise River
- Basin countries: United States
- Max. length: 0.18 mi (0.29 km)
- Max. width: 0.10 mi (0.16 km)
- Surface elevation: 7,943 ft (2,421 m)

Alidade Lake is a small alpine lake in Elmore County, Idaho, United States, located in the Sawtooth Mountains in the Sawtooth National Recreation Area. The lake is accessed from Sawtooth National Forest trail 459 along Johnson Creek.

Alidade Lake is in the Sawtooth Wilderness, and a wilderness permit can be obtained at trailheads or wilderness boundaries.

== See also ==
- List of lakes of the Sawtooth Mountains (Idaho)
- Sawtooth National Forest
- Sawtooth National Recreation Area
- Sawtooth Range (Idaho)
