= Vernon Lake (Idaho) =

Lake in Idaho

- Location within Idaho Location within the United States
- Location: Boise County, Idaho
- Coordinates: 43.9636°N 114.992289°W
- Type: Glacial
- Primary outflows: South Fork Payette River
- Basin countries: United States
- Max. length: 0.34 mi (0.55 km)
- Max. width: 0.20 mi (0.32 km)
- Surface elevation: 8,460 ft (2,580 m)

Vernon Lake is an alpine lake in Boise County, Idaho, United States, located high in the Sawtooth Mountains in the Sawtooth National Recreation Area. The lake is approximately 17 miles (27 km) southwest of Stanley and 14.5 miles (23.3 km) southeast of Grandjean. Located in the remote central Sawtooth Wilderness, Vernon Lake can be reached by trails from many directions, including the Sawtooth Valley (east), Grandjean (northwest), Redfish Lake (north), and Atlanta (south).

Vernon Lake is in a basin with several other lakes, including Edna Lake and Virginia Lake along the spine of the Sawtooths just below the border of Boise, Custer, and Elmore counties. It is immediately downstream of the unnamed lake that forms the headwaters of the South Fork of the Payette River.

Vernon Lake is in the Sawtooth Wilderness and wilderness permit can be obtained at trailheads.

== See also ==
- List of lakes of the Sawtooth Mountains (Idaho)
- Sawtooth National Forest
- Sawtooth National Recreation Area
- Sawtooth Range (Idaho)
