= Ardeth Lake =

Lake in Idaho, United States

- Location in Idaho Location in the United States
- Location: Boise County, Idaho
- Coordinates: 43°57′54″N 115°00′51″W
- Type: Glacial
- Primary inflows: Tenlake Creek
- Primary outflows: Tenlake Creek to South Fork of Payette River
- Basin countries: United States
- Max. length: 0.50 mi (0.80 km)
- Max. width: 0.34 mi (0.55 km)
- Surface area: 78.5 acres (31.8 ha)
- Surface elevation: 8,232 ft (2,509 m)

Ardeth Lake is an alpine lake in Boise County, Idaho, United States, located high in the Sawtooth Mountains in the Sawtooth National Recreation Area. The lake is approximately 18 miles (29 km) south of Stanley. Ardeth Lake is most easily accessed from trailheads in the Sawtooth Valley, which are accessed from State Highway 75 or from the Grandjean trailhead to the northwest off of State Highway 21.

With a surface elevation of 8,228 feet (2,508 m) above sea level, Ardeth Lake often remains frozen into early summer. At the southern end of the lake is Glens Peak at 10,053 feet (3,064 m) in elevation.

Ardeth Lake is in the central Sawtooth Wilderness, and wilderness permit can be obtained at trailheads.

== See also ==
- List of lakes of the Sawtooth Mountains (Idaho)
- Sawtooth National Forest
- Sawtooth National Recreation Area
- Sawtooth Range (Idaho)
