= Rendezvous Lake =

Lake in Boise County, Idaho, United States

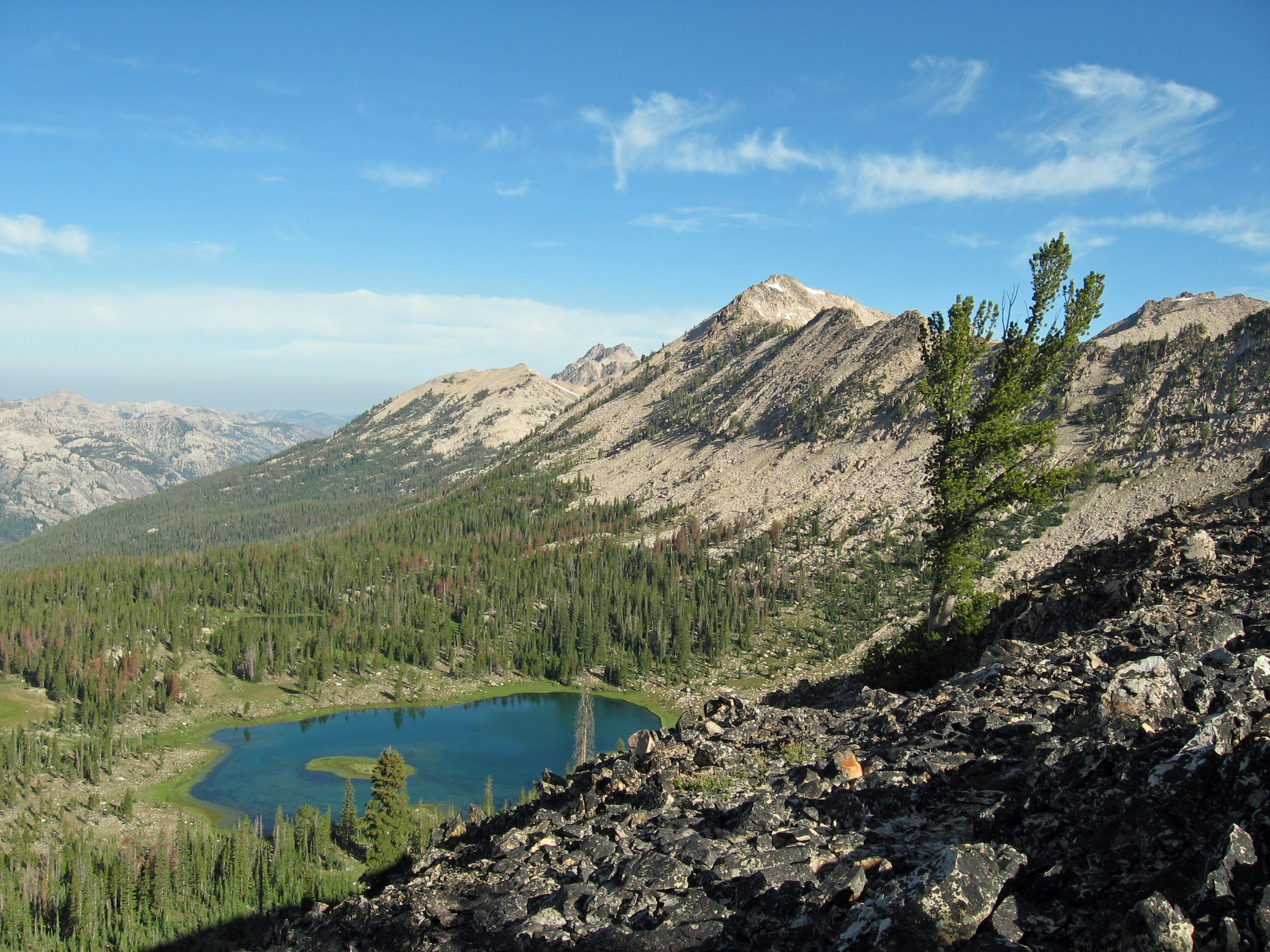
- Rendezvous Lake at right from Sand Mountain Pass

- Location within Idaho Location within the United States
- Location: Boise County, Idaho
- Coordinates: 43°58′43″N 114°58′32″W
- Type: Glacial
- Primary outflows: South Fork Payette River
- Basin countries: United States
- Max. length: 0.18 mi (0.29 km)
- Max. width: 0.11 mi (0.18 km)
- Surface elevation: 8,875 ft (2,705 m)
- Islands: 1

Rendezvous Lake is a small alpine lake in Boise County, Idaho, United States, located in the Sawtooth Mountains in the Sawtooth National Recreation Area. Sawtooth National Forest trail 452 leads to the lake.

Rendezvous Lake is in the Sawtooth Wilderness, and a wilderness permit can be obtained at a registration box at trailheads or wilderness boundaries.

== See also ==
- List of lakes of the Sawtooth Mountains (Idaho)
- Sawtooth National Forest
- Sawtooth National Recreation Area
- Sawtooth Range (Idaho)
