= Iron Creek =

Stream in Alberta, Canada

Coordinates: 52.7152778°N 111.2330556°W

Iron Creek is a stream in Alberta, Canada. It is a tributary of the Battle River.

Iron Creek received its name from the Cree people of the area, on account of an iron meteorite unearthed near its course.

== See also ==
- List of rivers of Alberta
