= Virginia Lake (Sawtooth Wilderness) =

Glacial lake in Boise County, Idaho, United States

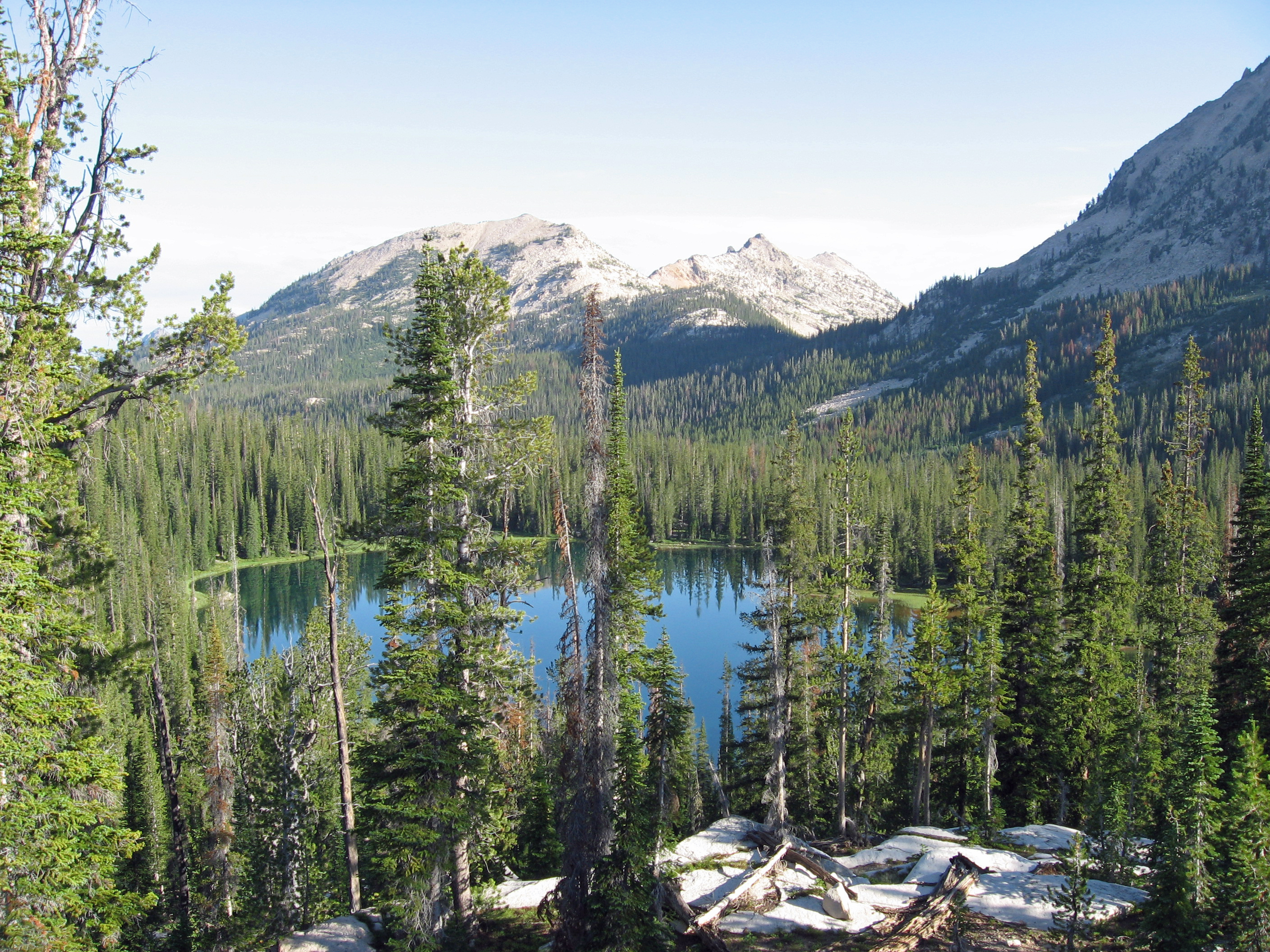
- Virginia Lake

- Location within Idaho Location within the United States
- Location: Boise County, Idaho
- Coordinates: 43.976889°N 114.993233°W
- Type: Glacial
- Primary inflows: South Fork Payette River
- Primary outflows: South Fork Payette River
- Basin countries: United States
- Max. length: 0.20 mi (0.32 km)
- Max. width: 0.13 mi (0.21 km)
- Surface elevation: 8,254 ft (2,516 m)

Virginia Lake is an alpine lake in Boise County, Idaho, United States, located high in the Sawtooth Mountains in the Sawtooth National Recreation Area. The lake is approximately 17 miles (27 km) southwest of Stanley and 14.5 miles (23.3 km) southeast of Grandjean. Located in the remote central Sawtooth Wilderness, Edna Lake can be reached by trails from many directions, including the Sawtooth Valley (east), Grandjean (northwest), Redfish Lake (north), and Atlanta (south).

Virginia Lake is in a basin with several other lakes, including Vernon Lake and Edna Lake along the spine of the Sawtooths just below the border of Boise, Custer, and Elmore counties.

Virginia Lake is in the Sawtooth Wilderness and wilderness permit can be obtained at trailheads.

== See also ==
- List of lakes of the Sawtooth Mountains (Idaho)
- Sawtooth National Forest
- Sawtooth National Recreation Area
- Sawtooth Range (Idaho)
