= Stevens Lakes (Idaho) =

Alpine lake in the state of Idaho

- Location within Idaho Location within the United States
- Interactive map of Stevens Lakes
- Location: Sawtooth National Recreation Area; Boise County, Idaho
- Type: Alpine glacial lakes
- Basin countries: United States
- Managing agency: National Park Service
- Max. length: 620–1,263 feet (189–385 m)
- Max. width: 148–574 feet (45–175 m)
- Surface elevation: 8,370–8,940 feet (2,550–2,720 m)

The Stevens Lakes are a chain of small alpine lakes in Custer County, Idaho, United States, located in the Sawtooth Mountains in the Sawtooth National Recreation Area. There are no trails leading to the lakes.

The Stevens Lakes are in the Fishhook Creek drainage and the Sawtooth Wilderness. A wilderness permit can be obtained at a registration box at trailheads or wilderness boundaries.

Stevens Lakes
Lake	Elevation	Max. length	Max. width	Location
Stevens Lake 1	2,550 m (8,370 ft)	385 m (1,263 ft)	110 m (360 ft)	44.104514°N 115.015272°W
Stevens Lake 2	2,570 m (8,430 ft)	095 m (312 ft)	045 m (148 ft)	44.104514°N 115.015272°W
Stevens Lake 3	2,605 m (8,547 ft)	240 m (790 ft)	125 m (410 ft)	44.101586°N 115.0115°W
Stevens Lake 4	2,725 m (8,940 ft)	190 m (620 ft)	175 m (574 ft)	44.099958°N 115.004469°W

Notably Stevens Lakes could also refer to upper and lower Stevens lakes found in northern Idaho near the city of Mullan. The two lake chain is accessible by a trail that leads up to Stevens Peak.

== See also ==
- List of lakes of the Sawtooth Mountains (Idaho)
- Sawtooth National Forest
- Sawtooth National Recreation Area
- Sawtooth Range (Idaho)
