= Hidden Lake (Sawtooth Wilderness) =

Alpine lake in the state of Idaho

- Location within Idaho Location within the United States
- Location: Boise County, Idaho
- Coordinates: 44.000047°N 114.998117°W
- Lake type: Glacial
- Primary outflows: South Fork Payette River
- Basin countries: United States
- Max. length: 0.58 mi (0.93 km)
- Max. width: 0.16 mi (0.26 km)
- Surface elevation: 8,563 ft (2,610 m)

Hidden Lake is an alpine lake in Boise County, Idaho, United States, located in the Sawtooth Mountains in the Sawtooth National Recreation Area. The lake is accessed from Sawtooth National Forest trail 154.

Hidden Lake is in the Sawtooth Wilderness, and a wilderness permit can be obtained at a registration box at trailheads or wilderness boundaries. Mount Cramer, the second highest point in the Sawtooth Mountains rises to the northeast of Hidden Lake.

== See also ==
- List of lakes of the Sawtooth Mountains (Idaho)
- Sawtooth National Forest
- Sawtooth National Recreation Area
- Sawtooth Range (Idaho)
