= Farley Lake =

Alpine lake in the state of Idaho

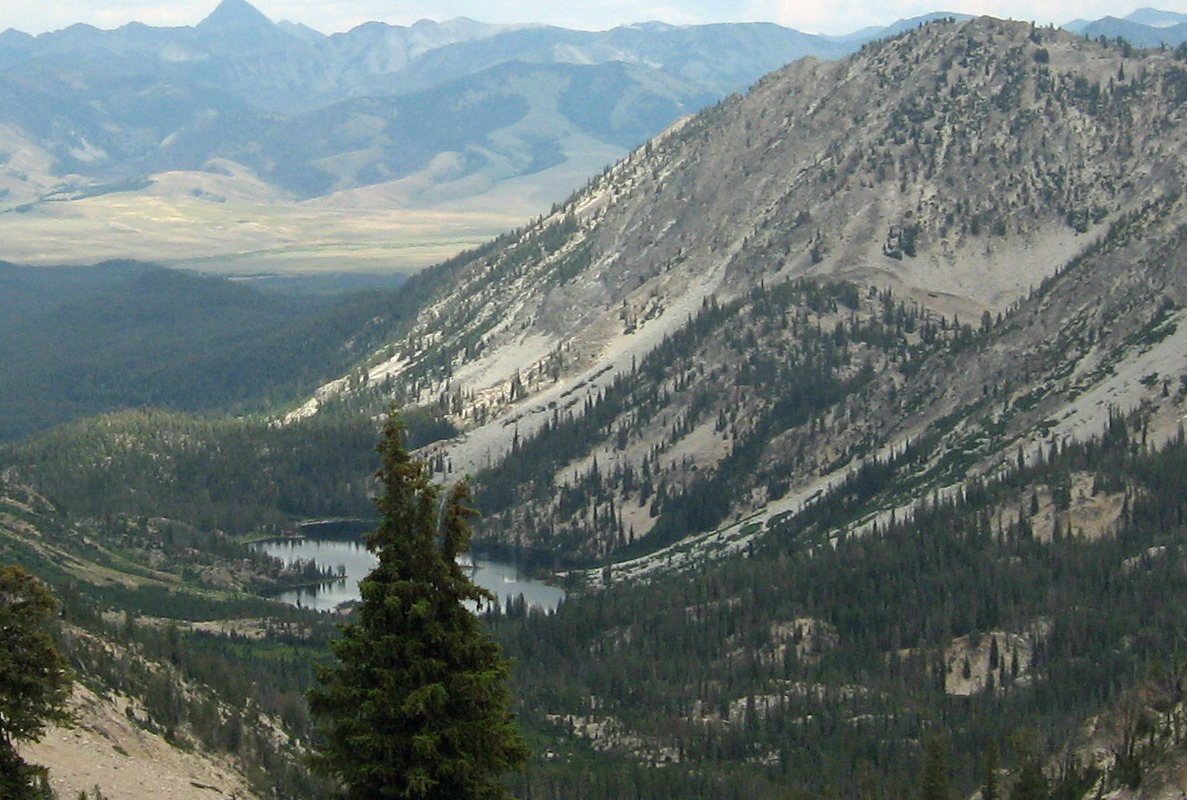
- Farley Lake

- Location within Idaho Location within the United States
- Location: Custer County, Idaho
- Coordinates: 43°58′46″N 114°55′51″W
- Lake type: Glacial
- Primary outflows: Creek to Salmon River
- Basin countries: United States
- Max. length: 0.41 mi (0.66 km)
- Max. width: 0.23 mi (0.37 km)
- Surface elevation: 7,745 ft (2,361 m)
- Islands: 2

Farley Lake is a small alpine lake in Custer County, Idaho, United States, located high in the Sawtooth Mountains in the Sawtooth National Recreation Area. The lake is approximately 16.5 miles (26.6 km) south of Stanley. There are two small islands in Farley Lake, the largest of which is only about 200 feet (61 m) long. A trail from the Yellow Belly Lake and Pettit Lake trailheads leads towards Edith Lake via Farley Lake. These trailheads can be accessed from State Highway 75 via Sawtooth National Forest road 208.

Farley Lake is in the Sawtooth Wilderness and wilderness permit can be obtained at trailheads. The hike to Farley Lake is along the route to Toxaway Lake as well as Edith Lake, both of which are upstream of Farley Lake.

== See also ==
- List of lakes of the Sawtooth Mountains (Idaho)
- Sawtooth National Forest
- Sawtooth National Recreation Area
- Sawtooth Range (Idaho)
