= The Hole (lake) =

Alpine lake in Idaho, United States

- Location within Idaho Location within the United States
- Location: Elmore County, Idaho
- Coordinates: 43°56′49″N 115°07′45″W
- Type: Glacial
- Primary inflows: Johnson Creek
- Primary outflows: Johnson Creek to Middle Fork Boise River
- Basin countries: United States
- Max. length: 0.12 mi (0.19 km)
- Max. width: 0.08 mi (0.13 km)
- Surface elevation: 8,400 ft (2,600 m)

The Hole Lake is a small alpine lake in Elmore County, Idaho, United States, located in the Sawtooth Mountains in the Sawtooth National Recreation Area. The lake is accessed from Sawtooth National Forest trail 459 along Johnson Creek.

The Hole is in the Sawtooth Wilderness, and a wilderness permit can be obtained at a registration box at trailheads or wilderness boundaries. This lake is just upstream of Johnson Lake.

== See also ==
- List of lakes of the Sawtooth Mountains (Idaho)
- Sawtooth National Forest
- Sawtooth National Recreation Area
- Sawtooth Range (Idaho)
