= Limber Lake =

Lake in Idaho, United States

- Location within Idaho Location within the United States
- Location: Boise County, Idaho
- Coordinates: 44°02′43″N 115°03′17″W
- Type: Glacial
- Primary outflows: Goat Creek to South Fork Payette River
- Basin countries: United States
- Max. length: 0.12 mi (0.19 km)
- Max. width: 0.08 mi (0.13 km)
- Surface elevation: 8,700 ft (2,700 m)

Limber Lake is a small alpine lake in Boise County, Idaho, United States, located in the Sawtooth Mountains in the Sawtooth National Recreation Area. There are no trails leading to the lake or the Goat Creek drainage.

Limber Lake is in the Sawtooth Wilderness, and a wilderness permit can be obtained at a registration box at trailheads or wilderness boundaries. Three Lake and Oraemnus Lake are downstream of Limber Lake.

== See also ==
- List of lakes of the Sawtooth Mountains (Idaho)
- Sawtooth National Forest
- Sawtooth National Recreation Area
- Sawtooth Range (Idaho)
