= Snowbank Lake (Idaho) =

Lake in Idaho, United States

- Location within Idaho Location within the United States
- Location: Elmore County, Idaho
- Coordinates: 43°56′49″N 115°07′20″W
- Type: Glacial
- Primary outflows: Johnson Creek to Middle Fork Boise River
- Basin countries: United States
- Max. length: 0.10 mi (0.16 km)
- Max. width: 0.07 mi (0.11 km)
- Surface elevation: 8,875 ft (2,705 m)

Snowbank Lake is a small alpine lake in Elmore County, Idaho, United States, located in the Sawtooth Mountains in the Sawtooth National Recreation Area. No trails lead directly to this lake although Sawtooth National Forest trails 458, 494, and 459 are relatively close.

Snowbank Lake is in the Sawtooth Wilderness, and a wilderness permit can be obtained at a registration box at trailheads or wilderness boundaries.

== See also ==
- List of lakes of the Sawtooth Mountains (Idaho)
- Sawtooth National Forest
- Sawtooth National Recreation Area
- Sawtooth Range (Idaho)
