= Yellow Belly Lake =

Alpine lake in the state of Idaho

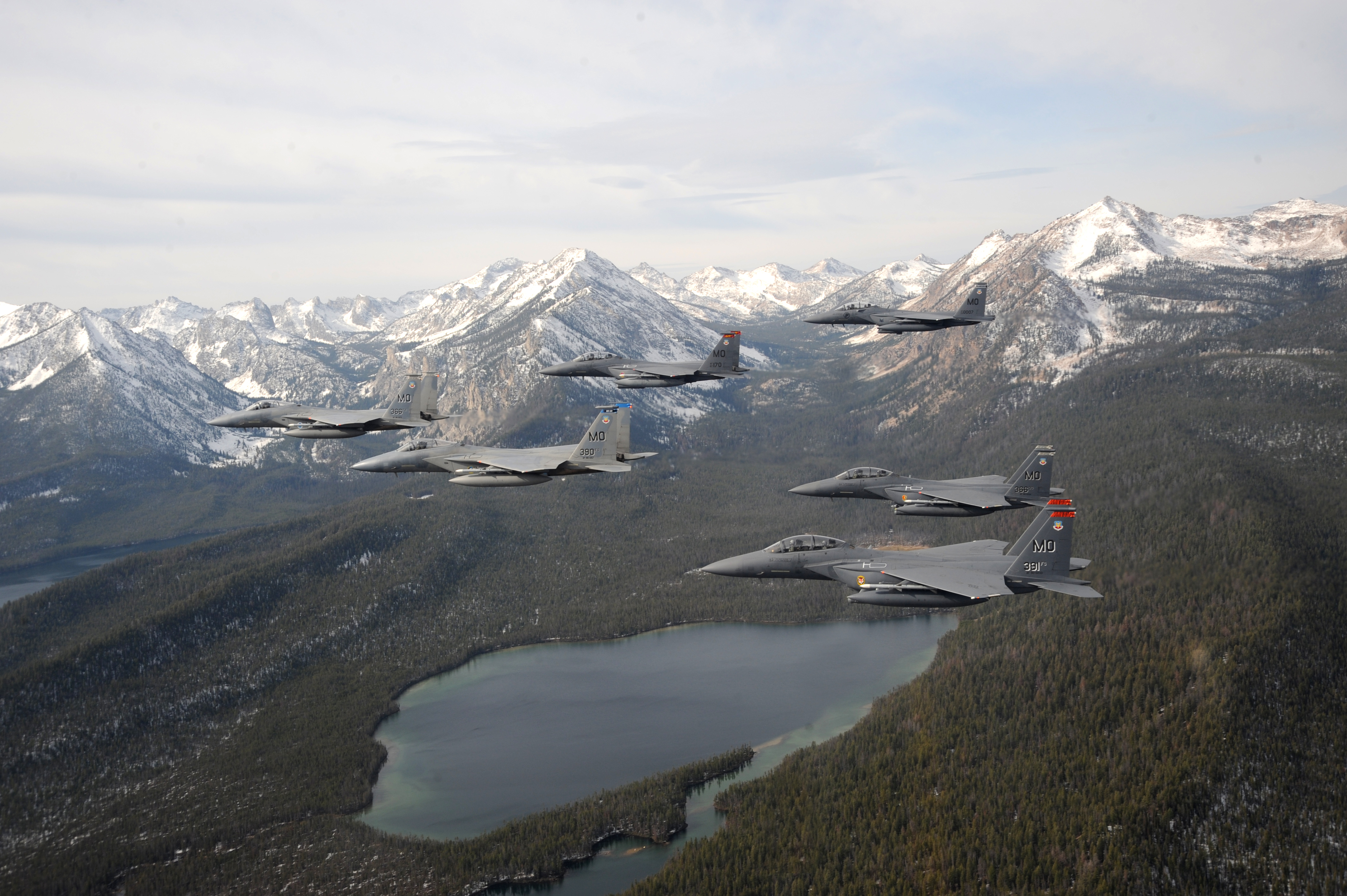
- Jets above Yellow Belly Lake

- Location within Idaho Location within the United States
- Location: Custer County, Idaho
- Coordinates: 44.000803°N 114.875131°W
- Type: Glacial
- Primary outflows: Creek to Salmon River
- Basin countries: United States
- Max. length: 0.81 mi (1.30 km)
- Max. width: 0.55 mi (0.89 km)
- Surface elevation: 7,076 ft (2,157 m)

Yellow Belly Lake is an alpine lake in Custer County, Idaho, United States, located in the Sawtooth Valley in the Sawtooth National Recreation Area. The lake is approximately 15 miles (24 km) south of Stanley and 34 miles (55 km) northwest of Ketchum. Yellow Belly Lake can be accessed from State Highway 75 via Sawtooth National Forest road 205 and 096. Forest road 096 is a high clearance road that goes directly to a trailhead and campground on the shores of Yellow Belly Lake.

In the southern section of the Sawtooth Valley, Yellow Belly Lake is one of the largest lakes in Sawtooth National Recreation Area.

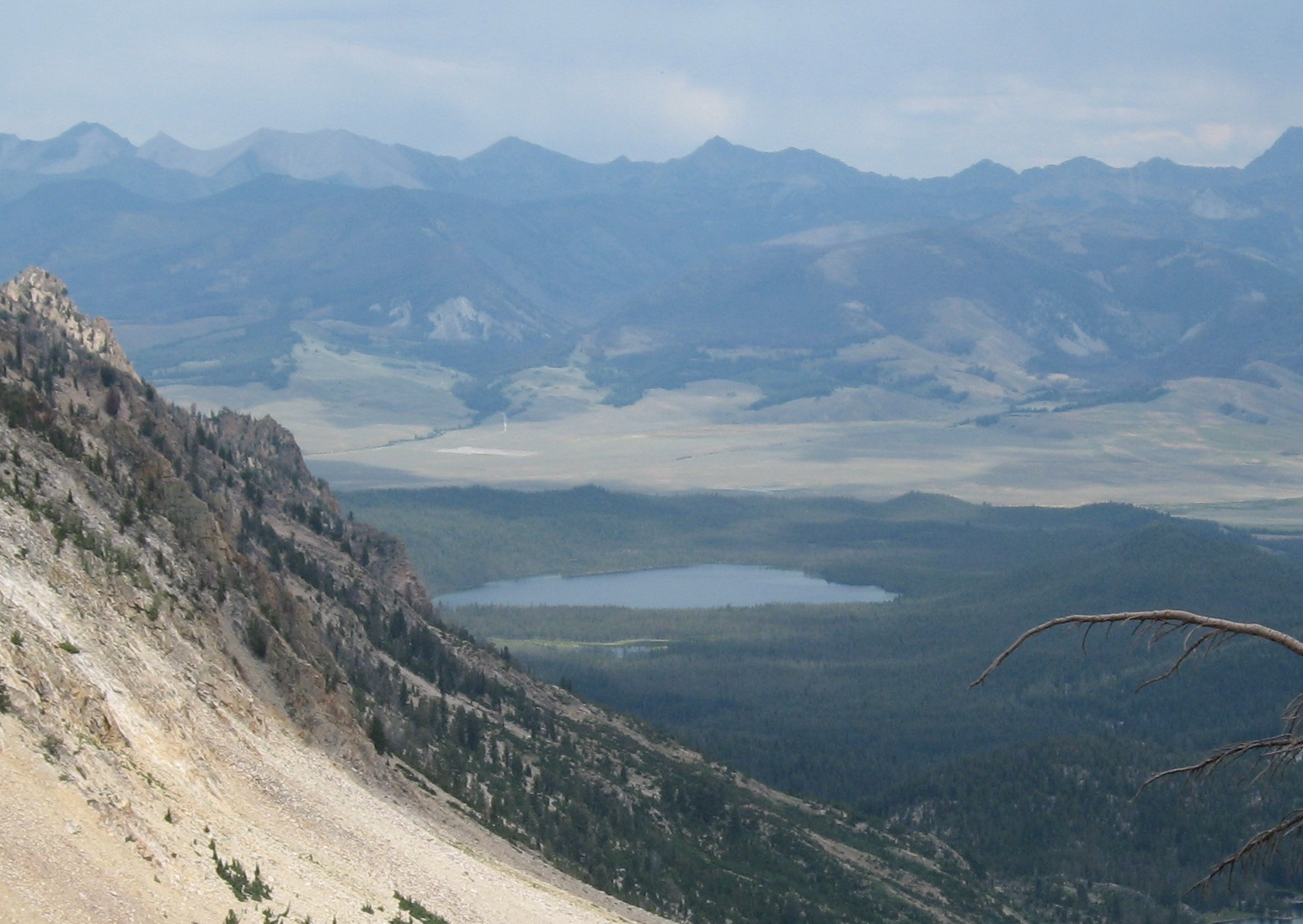
Yellow Belly Lake from the west

== See also ==
- List of lakes of the Sawtooth Mountains (Idaho)
- Sawtooth National Forest
- Sawtooth National Recreation Area
- Sawtooth Range (Idaho)
