= Mount Iowa =

Mountain in the state of Idaho

- Location within Idaho

Highest point
- Elevation: 10,327 ft (3,148 m)
- Prominence: 487 ft (148 m)
- Parent peak: Horstmann Peak
- Coordinates: 44°06′13″N 114°59′53″W

Geography
- Location: Custer County, Idaho, U.S.
- Parent range: Sawtooth Range
- Topo map: USGS Mount Cramer

Climbing
- Easiest route: Scramble, class 3

Mount Iowa, at 10,327 feet (3,148 m) above sea level is a peak in the Sawtooth Range of Idaho. The peak is located in the Sawtooth Wilderness of Sawtooth National Recreation Area in Custer County. The peak is located 0.65 mi (1.05 km) south-southeast of Horstmann Peak, its line parent. It is about 0.7 mi (1.1 km) north of Braxon Peak and 1.1 mi (1.8 km) west of Mount Heyburn.

== See also ==
- List of peaks of the Sawtooth Range (Idaho)
- List of mountains of Idaho
- List of mountain peaks of Idaho
- List of mountain ranges in Idaho
