= Decker Peak =

Mountain in Idaho, USA

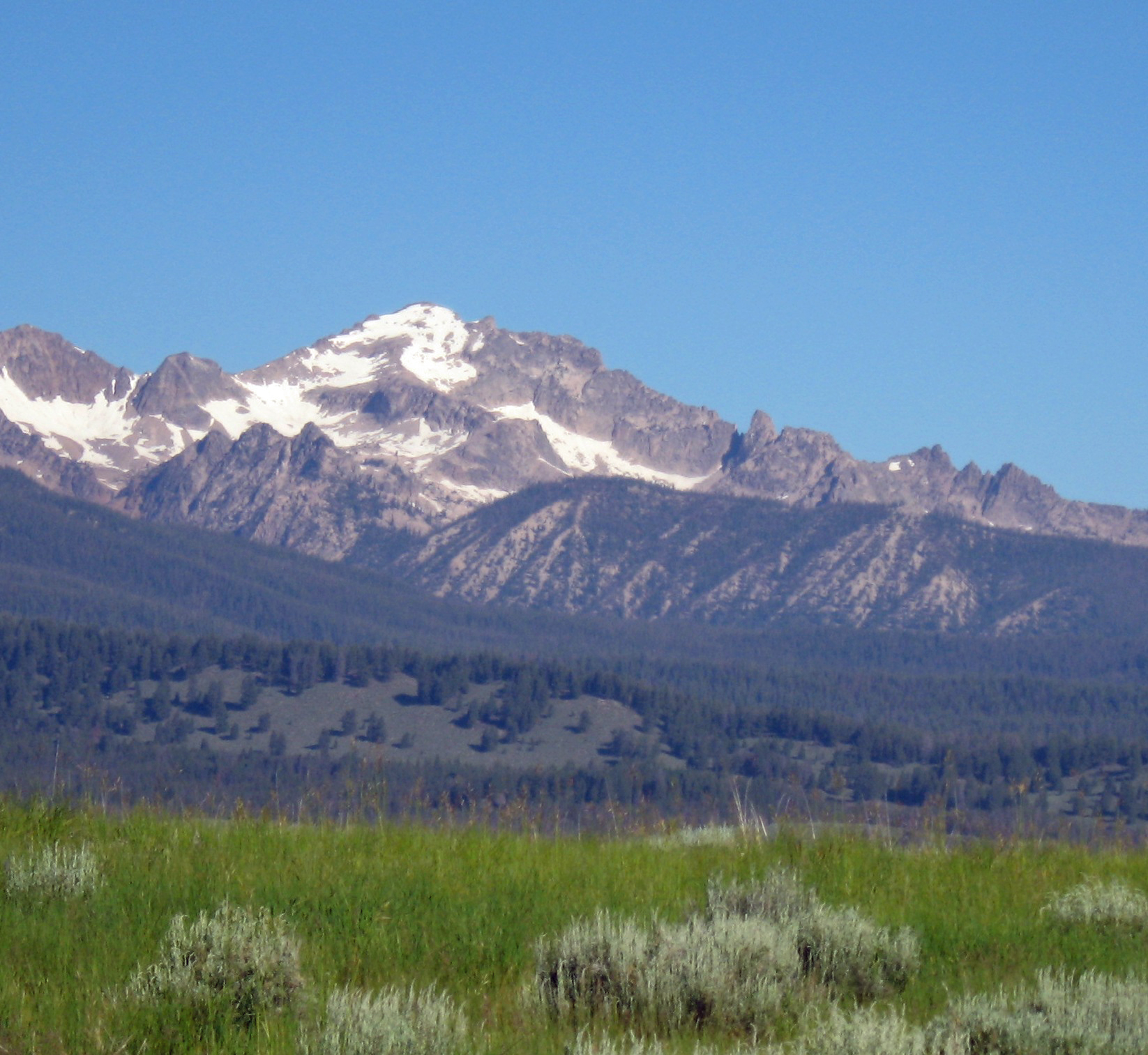
- Decker Peak from the southeast

Highest point
- Elevation: 10,704 ft (3,263 m)
- Prominence: 744 ft (227 m)
- Parent peak: Mount Cramer
- Coordinates: 44°02′35″N 114°58′03″W

Geography
- Location within Idaho
- Location: Custer County, Idaho, U.S.
- Parent range: Sawtooth Range
- Topo map: USGS Mount Cramer

Climbing
- Easiest route: Scrambling, class 3

Decker Peak, at 10,704 feet (3,263 m) above sea level is the third highest peak in the Sawtooth Range of Idaho. The peak is located in the Sawtooth Wilderness of Sawtooth National Recreation Area in Custer County. The peak is located 2.3 mi (3.7 km) south-southwest of Mount Cramer, its line parent. It is the 204th highest peak in Idaho.

== See also ==
- List of peaks of the Sawtooth Range (Idaho)
- List of mountains of Idaho
- List of mountain peaks of Idaho
- List of mountain ranges in Idaho
