= Horstmann Peak =

Mountain in the state of Idaho

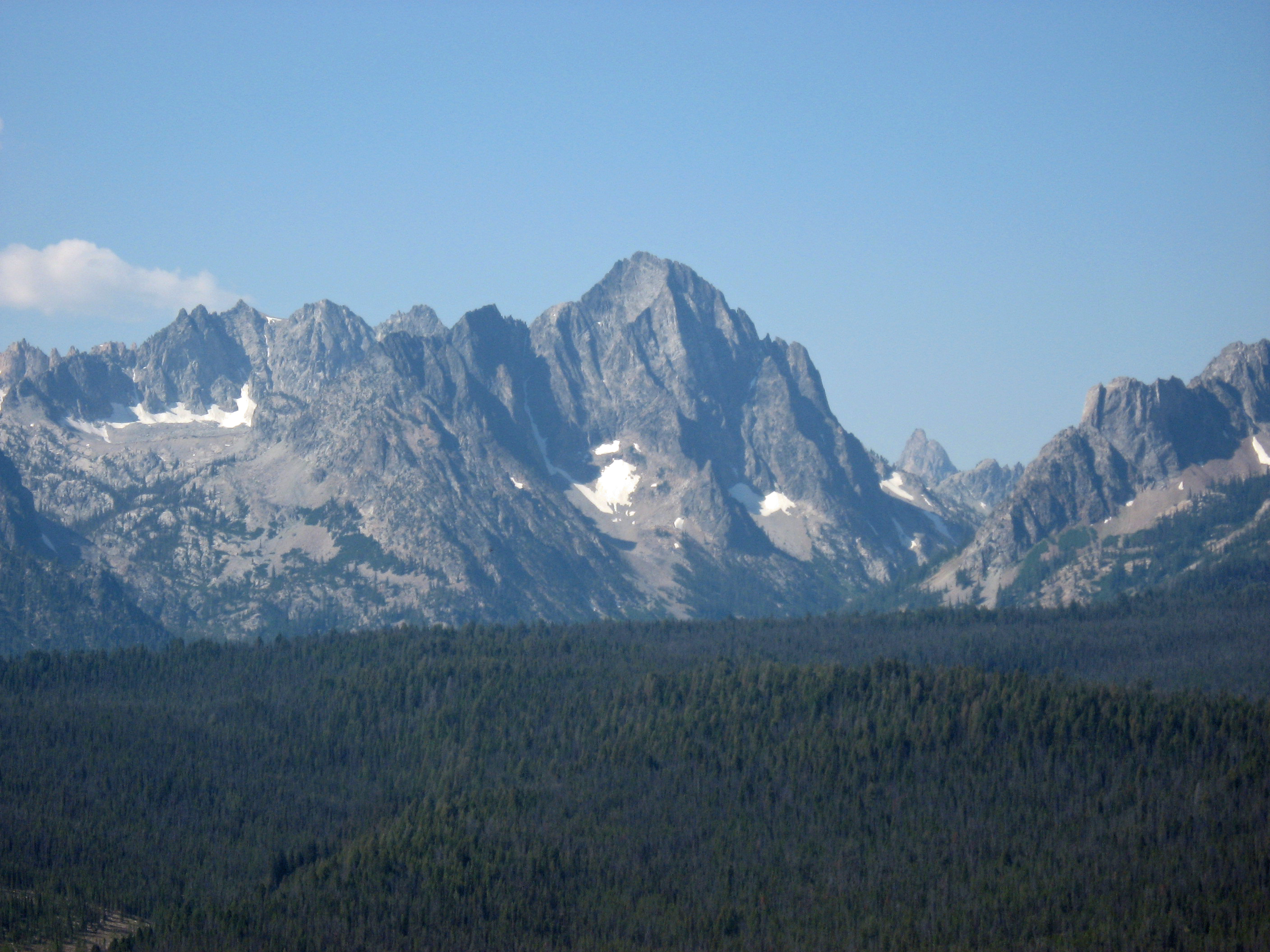
- Horstmann Peak from the northeast

Highest point
- Elevation: 10,475 ft (3,193 m)
- Prominence: 1,430 ft (440 m)
- Parent peak: Mickey's Spire
- Coordinates: 44°06′46″N 115°00′04″W

Geography
- Location within Idaho
- Location: Custer County, Idaho, U.S.
- Parent range: Sawtooth Range
- Topo map: USGS Warbonnet Peak

Climbing
- Easiest route: Scrambling, class 3

Horstmann Peak, at 10,475 feet (3,193 m) above sea level is the 11th highest peak in the Sawtooth Range of Idaho. The peak is located in the Sawtooth Wilderness of Sawtooth National Recreation Area in Custer County. The peak is located 1.85 mi (2.98 km) south-southeast of Mickey's Spire, its line parent. It is also 2.0 mi (3.2 km) south of Thompson Peak and 1.35 mi (2.17 km) north of Braxon Peak.

== See also ==
- List of peaks of the Sawtooth Range (Idaho)
- List of mountains of Idaho
- List of mountain peaks of Idaho
- List of mountain ranges in Idaho
