= Mount Limbert =

Mountain in the state of Idaho

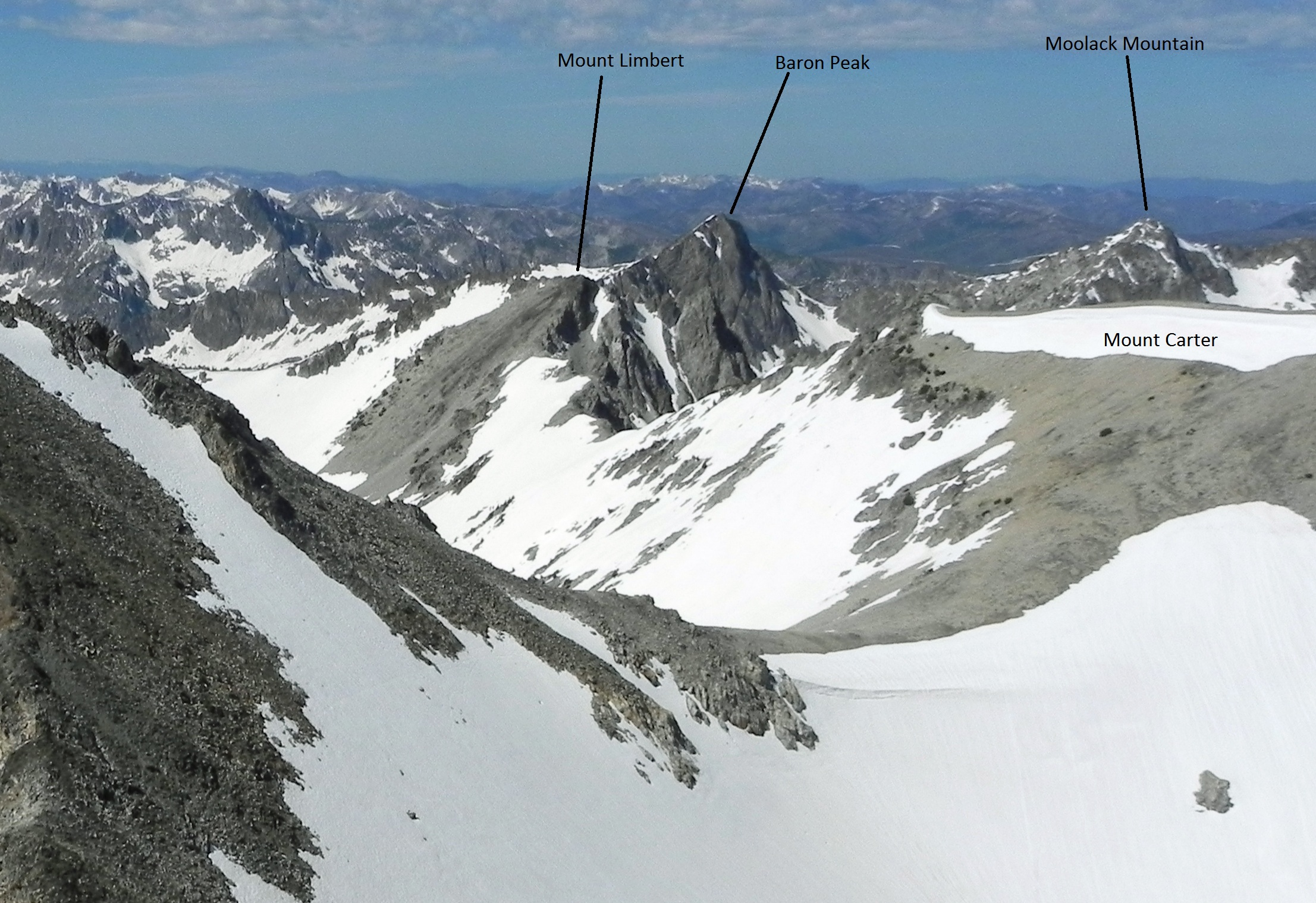
- Mount Limbert from Thompson Peak

Highest point
- Elevation: 10,385 ft (3,165 m)
- Prominence: 265 ft (81 m)
- Parent peak: Mount Carter
- Coordinates: 44°08′00″N 115°01′27″W

Geography
- Location within Idaho
- Location: Boise and Custer counties, Idaho, U.S.
- Parent range: Sawtooth Range
- Topo map: USGS Stanley Lake

Climbing
- Easiest route: Scramble, class 3

Mount Limbert, at 10,385 feet (3,165 m) above sea level is the 12th highest peak in the Sawtooth Range of Idaho. The peak is located in the Sawtooth Wilderness of Sawtooth National Recreation Area on the border of Boise and Custer counties. The peak is located 0.54 mi (0.87 km) southwest of Mount Carter, its line parent.

== See also ==
- List of peaks of the Sawtooth Range (Idaho)
- List of mountains of Idaho
- List of mountain peaks of Idaho
- List of mountain ranges in Idaho
