= Braxon Peak =

Mountain in the state of Idaho

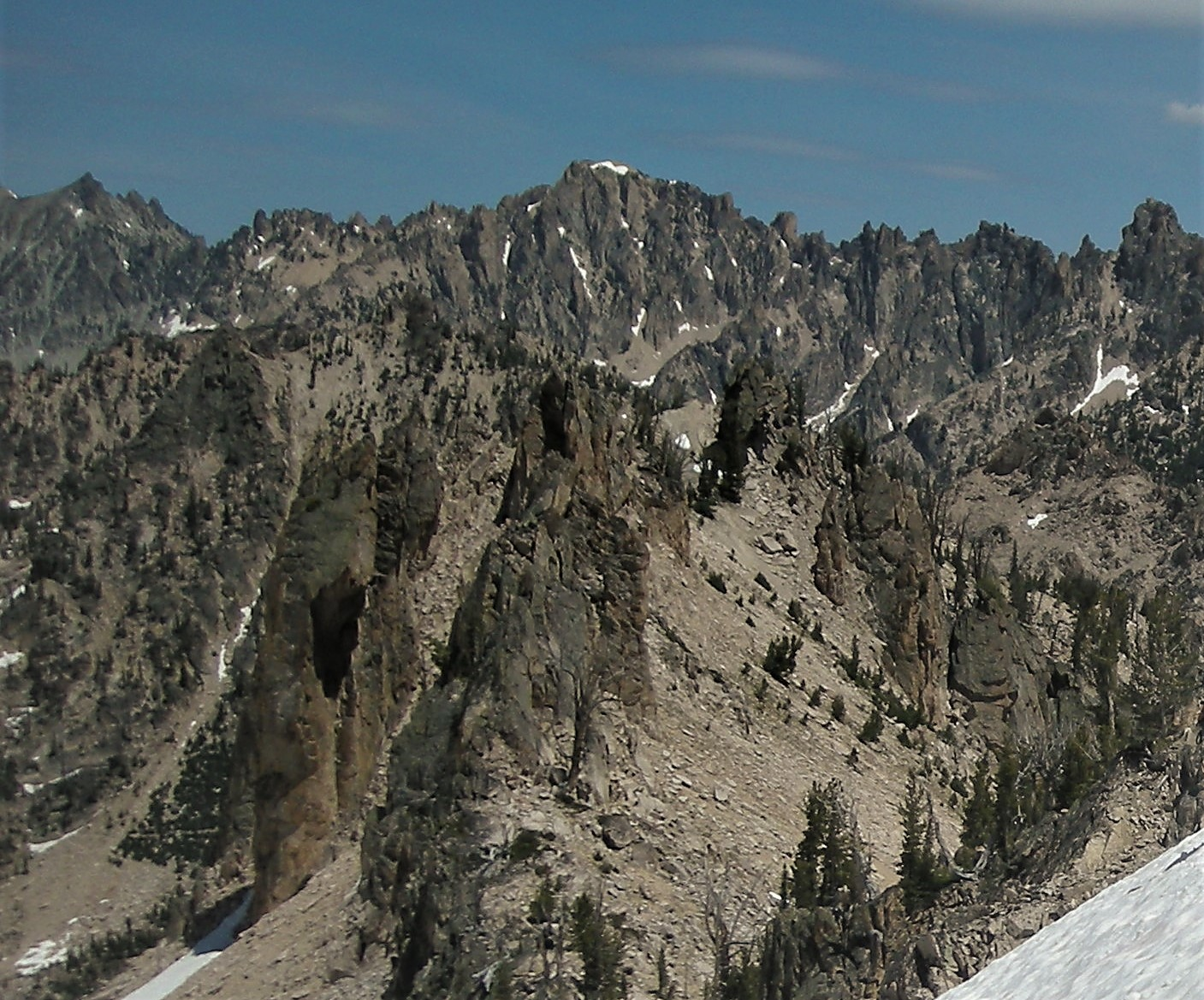
- Southwest aspect centered at top

Highest point
- Elevation: 10,353 ft (3,156 m)
- Prominence: 553 ft (169 m)
- Parent peak: Horstmann Peak
- Coordinates: 44°05′37″N 114°59′48″W

Geography
- Location within Idaho
- Location: Boise and Custer counties, Idaho, U.S.
- Parent range: Sawtooth Range
- Topo map: USGS Mount Cramer

Climbing
- Easiest route: Scrambling, class 3

Braxon Peak, at 10,353 feet (3,156 m) above sea level is a peak in the Sawtooth Range of Idaho. The peak is located in the Sawtooth Wilderness of Sawtooth National Recreation Area on the border of Boise and Custer counties. The peak is located 1.36 mi (2.19 km) south of Mount Cramer, its line parent. It is also about 1.2 mi (1.9 km) south-southwest of Mount Heyburn. Braxon Lake is just southwest of the peak.

== See also ==
- List of peaks of the Sawtooth Range (Idaho)
- List of mountains of Idaho
- List of mountain peaks of Idaho
- List of mountain ranges in Idaho
