= Tohobit Peak =

Mountain in Idaho, United States

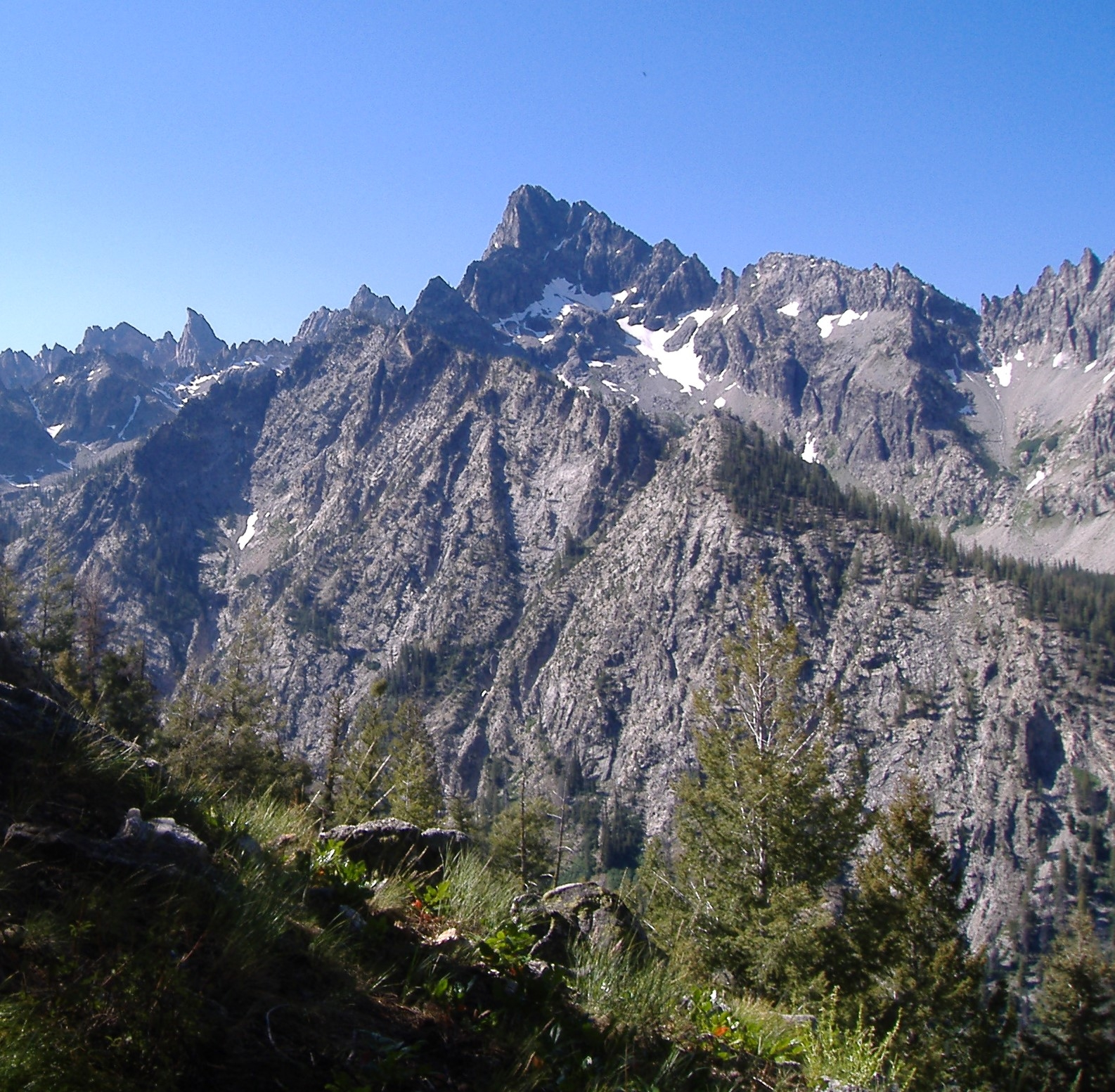
- North aspect

Highest point
- Elevation: 10,046 ft (3,062 m)
- Prominence: 906 ft (276 m)
- Parent peak: Warbonnet Peak (10,200 ft)
- Isolation: 1.11 mi (1.79 km)
- Listing: Peaks of the Sawtooth Range
- Coordinates: 44°05′30″N 115°04′02″W

Geography
- Location within Idaho Location within the United States
- Country: United States
- State: Idaho
- County: Boise
- Protected area: Sawtooth Wilderness
- Parent range: Sawtooth Range; Rocky Mountains
- Topo map: USGS Warbonnet Peak

Geology
- Rock age: Eocene
- Mountain type: Fault block
- Rock type: Granite

Climbing
- First ascent: 1985
- Easiest route: class 3–4 West ridge

Tohobit Peak is a 10,046-foot elevation (3,062 m) mountain summit located in Boise County, Idaho, United States.

== Description ==
Tohobit Peak is part of the Sawtooth Range which is a subset of the Rocky Mountains. The peak ranks as the 16th-highest in Boise County. The mountain is situated 11 miles (18 km) southwest of Stanley, Idaho, in the Sawtooth Wilderness on land managed by Boise National Forest. Precipitation runoff from the mountain's slopes drains to the South Fork Payette River via Baron and Goat creeks. Topographic relief is significant as the summit rises 3,450 feet (1,050 meters) above Baron Creek in 1.1 mile (1.8 km) and 3,150 feet (960 meters) above Goat Creek in 0.85 mile (1.37 km). The first ascent of the summit was made in 1985 by Steve Grantham, Dave Ferguson, Ken Ferguson and Mike Crist via the West Ridge using a Goat Creek approach. "Tohobit" is a Native American word for "black." This landform's toponym has been officially adopted by the United States Board on Geographic Names.

== Climate ==
Based on the Köppen climate classification, Tohobit Peak is located in an alpine subarctic climate zone with long, cold, snowy winters, and cool to warm summers. Winter temperatures can drop below −10 °F with wind chill factors below −30 °F.

== See also ==
- List of mountain peaks of Idaho

== Gallery ==
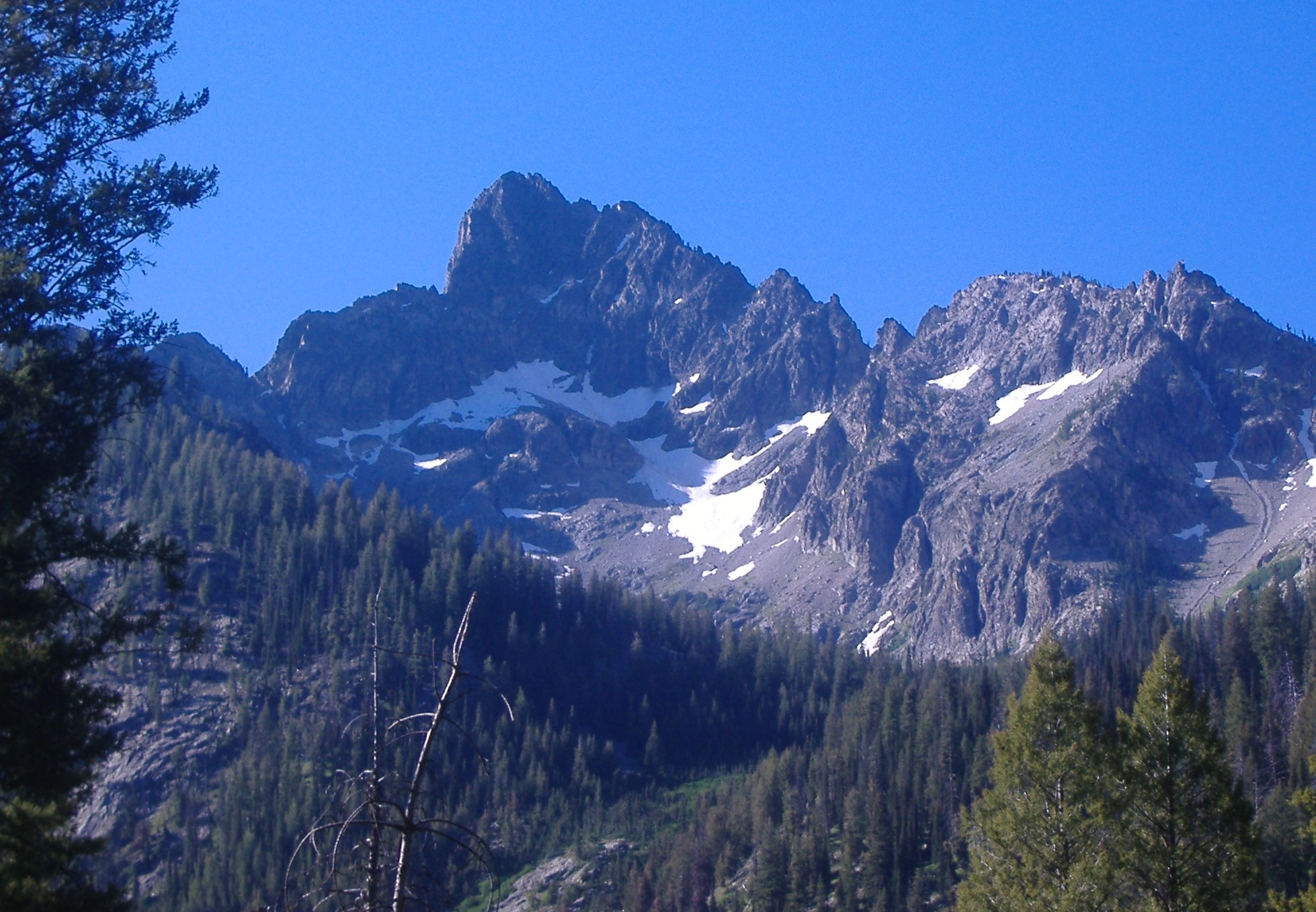
North face

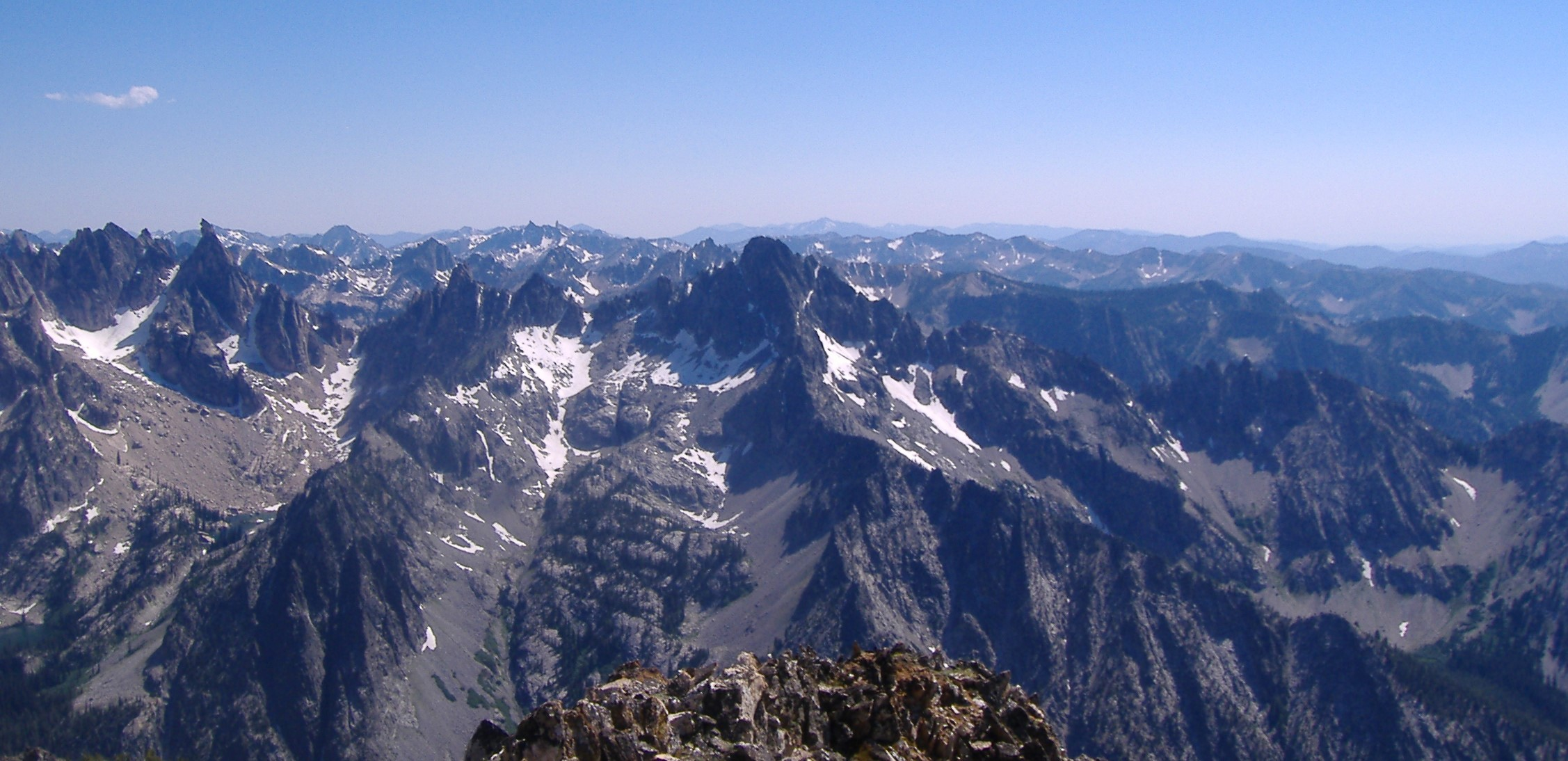
North aspect of Tohobit Peak centered.
