= Mount Carter (Idaho) =

Mountain in the state of Idaho

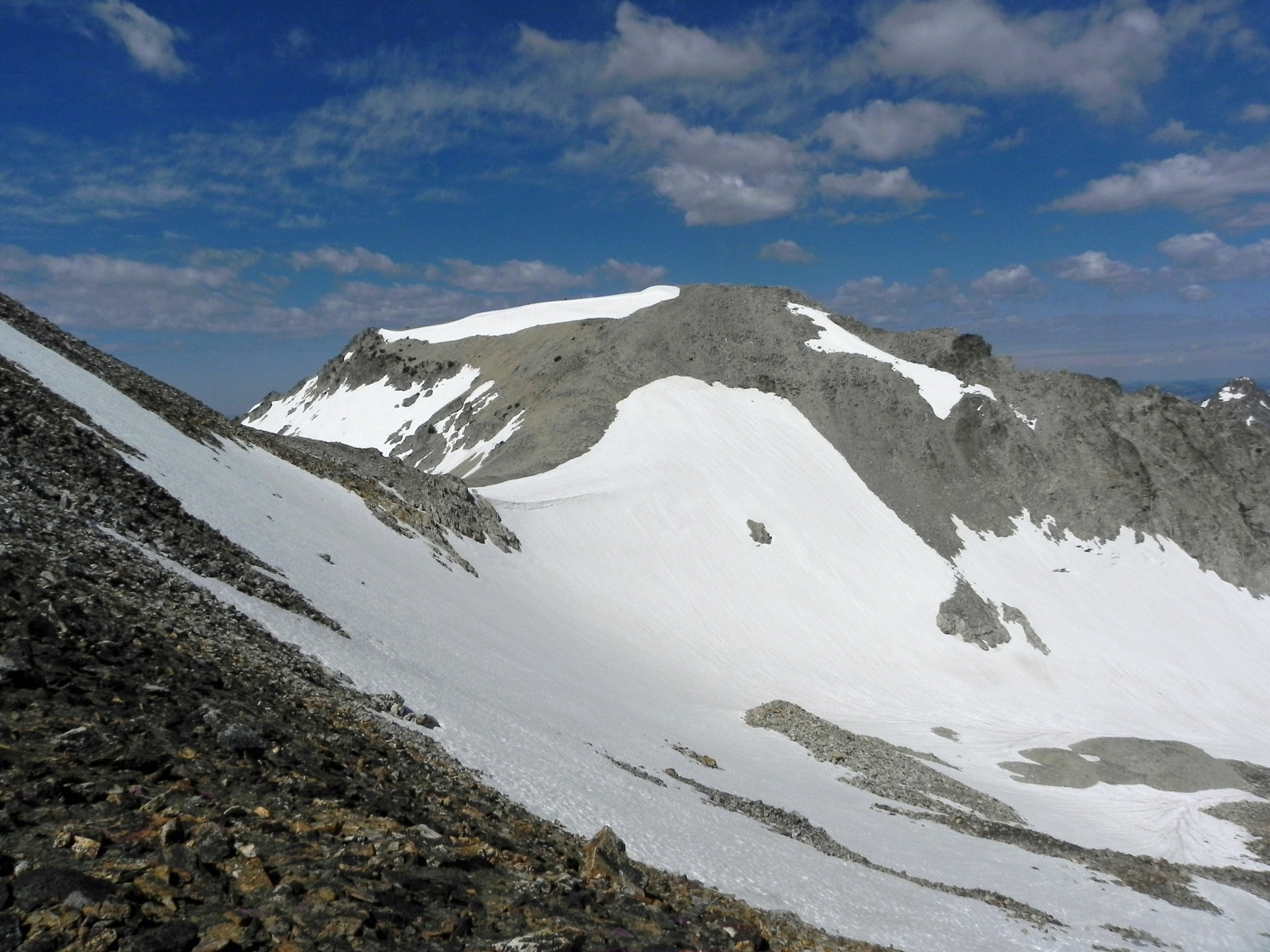
- Mount Carter from Thompson Peak

Highest point
- Elevation: 10,590 ft (3,230 m)
- Prominence: 270 ft (82 m)
- Parent peak: Mickey's Spire
- Coordinates: 44°08′23″N 115°01′06″W

Geography
- Location within Idaho
- Location: Boise and Custer counties, Idaho, U.S.
- Parent range: Sawtooth Range
- Topo map: USGS Stanley Lake

Climbing
- Easiest route: Scramble, class 3

Mount Carter, standing at 10,590 feet (3,230 m) above sea level, is the seventh-highest peak in the Sawtooth Range of Idaho. Located in the Sawtooth Wilderness within the Sawtooth National Recreation Area, it lies on the border of Boise and Custer counties. The peak is located 0.32 mi (0.51 km) northwest of Mickey's Spire, its line parent, and 0.43 mi (0.69 km) west of Thompson Peak, the highest point in the range.

== See also ==
- List of peaks of the Sawtooth Range (Idaho)
- List of mountains of Idaho
- List of mountain peaks of Idaho
- List of mountain ranges in Idaho
