= Goat Lake (Sawtooth Wilderness) =

Alpine lake in the state of Idaho

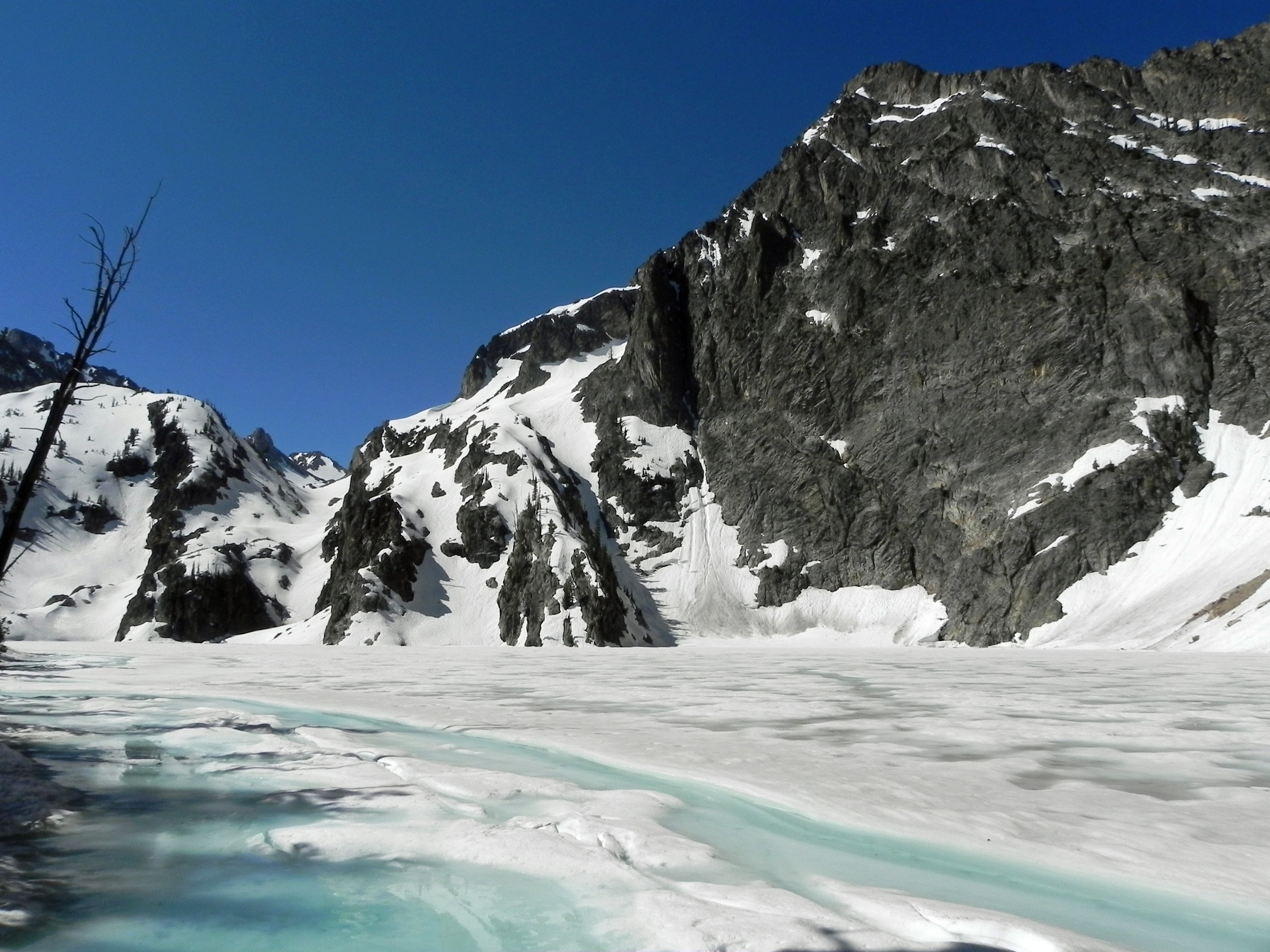
- Goat Lake

- Location within Idaho Location within the United States
- Location: Custer County, Idaho
- Coordinates: 44.174309°N 115.019581°W
- Lake type: Glacial
- Primary inflows: Goat Creek
- Primary outflows: Goat Creek to Salmon River
- Basin countries: United States
- Max. length: 0.44 mi (0.71 km)
- Max. width: 0.27 mi (0.43 km)
- Surface elevation: 8,220 ft (2,510 m)

Goat Lake is an alpine lake in Custer County, Idaho, United States, located high in the Sawtooth Mountains in the Sawtooth National Recreation Area. The lake is approximately 6 miles (9.7 km) southwest of Stanley. The lake is most easily accessed from the Iron Creek trailhead, which can be accessed from State Highway 21 via Sawtooth National Forest road 619.

The route to lake follows a combination of the Iron Creek trail, Alpine Way trail, and an unmaintained hiking trail to Goat Lake. The trail is about 8.5 miles round trip and gains 1615 feet in elevation. Along the hiking trail are Goat Falls, which are on Goat Creek, which flows into the lake and drains out of it.

With a surface elevation of 8,220 feet (2,510 m) above sea level, Goat Lake often remains frozen into early summer.

Goat Lake is in the Sawtooth Wilderness, and a wilderness permit can be obtained at trailheads. The hike to Goat Lake from the Iron Creek trailhead is a popular hike in the Sawtooth National Recreation Area. This trail gains 1,615 feet (492 m) and offers great views of the Sawtooth Valley. Visitors are permitted to camp anywhere in the National Forest, including around Goat Lake.

== See also ==
- List of lakes of the Sawtooth Mountains (Idaho)
- Sawtooth National Forest
- Sawtooth National Recreation Area
- Sawtooth Range (Idaho)
