= Mount Carter =

Mount Carter may refer to:

- Mount Carter (Idaho) in the Sawtooth Range
- Mount Carter (Montana) in Glacier National Park
