= Mount Cramer =

Mountain in the state of Idaho

- Location within Idaho

Highest point
- Elevation: 10,716 ft (3,266 m)
- Prominence: 1,716 ft (523 m)
- Parent peak: Thompson Peak
- Coordinates: 44°00′40″N 114°58′57″W

Geography
- Location: Custer and Boise Counties, Idaho, U.S.
- Parent range: Sawtooth Range
- Topo map: USGS Mount Cramer

Climbing
- Easiest route: Scramble - Class 3

Mount Cramer, at 10,716 feet (3,266 m) is the second highest peak in the Sawtooth Range of Idaho. The summit of Mount Cramer is located on the border of Custer and Boise Counties. The peak is the highest point in Boise County. Mount Cramer is also located within the Sawtooth Wilderness portion of the Sawtooth National Recreation Area. The town of Stanley, Idaho is almost 14 miles (23 km) from Mount Cramer, while the area known as Sawtooth City is nearly 12 miles (19 km) from Mount Cramer. The west side of Mount Cramer drains into the South Fork of the Payette River, while the east side drains to the Salmon River.

Mount Cramer can be climbed in one day via the Hell Roaring Lake Trailhead, which is located 5 miles (8.0 km) down unmaintained Sawtooth National Forest road 398, west of Idaho Route 75. The last section of the 16-mile (26 km) hike and class 3 scramble is off-trail.

== See also ==
- List of peaks of the Sawtooth Range (Idaho)
- List of mountains of Idaho
- List of mountain peaks of Idaho
- List of mountain ranges in Idaho
