= List of peaks of the Sawtooth Range (Idaho) =

This is a list of 147 of the peaks and climbing destinations in Idaho's Sawtooth Range.

147 Peaks and Climbing Destinations in the Sawtooth Mountains
Rank	Mountain Peak	Elevation	Prominence	Isolation	Location	Easiest Route
1	Thompson Peak	10,751 ft 3277 m	2,431 ft 741 m	19.16 mi 30.8 km	44.141534°N 115.010013°W	Class 3
2	Mount Cramer	10,715 ft 3266 m	1,716 ft 523 m	5.66 mi 9.11 km	44.011147°N 114.982491°W	Class 3
3	Decker Peak	10,705 ft 3263 m	745 ft 227 m	2.31 mi 3.71 km	44.042773°N 114.967651°W	Class 3
4	Mickey's Spire	10,679 ft 3255 m	279 ft 85 m	0.24 mi 0.39 km	44.138368°N 115.012127°W	Class 4
5	Snowyside Peak	10,650 ft 3246 m	1,545 ft 471 m	5.07 mi 8.16 km	43.938155°N 114.971267°W	Class 3
6	Williams Peak	10,636 ft 3242 m	837 ft 255 m	0.78 mi 1.26 km	44.152471°N 115.005751°W	Class 3
7	Mount Carter	10,591 ft 3228 m	269 ft 82 m	0.32 mi 0.52 km	44.139835°N 115.018282°W	Class 2
8	Elk Peak	10,581 ft 3225 m	1,181 ft 360 m	2.88 mi 4.64 km	44.024403°N 115.037317°W	Class 4
9	Dave's Peak	10,577 ft 3224 m	359 ft 109 m	0.65 mi 1.05 km	44.01933°N 114.97587°W	Class 4
10	Sevy Peak	10,479 ft 3194 m	745 ft 227 m	2.31 mi 3.71 km	44.024622°N 114.973355°W	Class 5.4
11	Horstmann Peak	10,469 ft 3191 m	1,430 ft 436 m	1.85 mi 2.97 km	44.112641°N 115.002095°W	Class 3
12	Mount Limbert	10,384 ft 3165 m	262 ft 80 m	0.54 mi 0.87 km	44.133268°N 115.024098°W	Class 3
13	Peak 10,375	10,374 ft 3162 m	315 ft 96 m	0.54 mi 0.87 km	44.0348°N 114.9684°W	Class 3
14	Braxon Peak	10,354 ft 3156 m	554 ft 169 m	1.35 mi 2.18 km	44.093378°N 114.996857°W	Class 3
15	Peak 10,336	10,335 ft 3150 m	unknown	unknown		Class 3
16	Moolack Mountain	10,331 ft 3149 m	790 ft 241 m	2.03 mi 3.27 km	44.13012°N 115.05033°W	Class 3
17	Mount Iowa	10,328 ft 3148 m	489 ft 149 m	0.65 mi 1.05 km	44.103632°N 114.998191°W	Class 3
18	Merritt Peak	10,312 ft 3143 m	433 ft 132 m	1.07 mi 1.73 km	44.16160°N 115.02353°W	Class 4
19	Baron Peak	10,299 ft 3139 m	817 ft 249 m	0.48 mi 0.78 km	44.123578°N 115.046409°W	Class 3
20	Red Bluff	10,269 ft 3130 m	212 ft 65 m	0.21 mi 0.34 km	44.0274°N 114.9750°W	Class 5.3
21	Perfect Peak	10,269 ft 3130 m	609 ft 186 m	1.77 mi 2.85 km	43.91918°N 114.94718°W	Class 3
22	The Arrowhead	10,249 ft 3124 m	338 ft 103 m	0.65 mi 1.04 km	44.019344°N 114.97611°W	Class 5.9
23	Packrat Peak	10,240 ft 3121 m	719 ft 219 m	2.38 mi 3.83 km	44.058562°N 115.043519°W	Class 5.1
24	South Merritt Peak	10,240 ft 3121 m	unknown	unknown		Class 4
25	Mount Heyburn	10,226 ft 3117 m	561 ft 171 m	1.01 mi 1.62 km	44.100979°N 114.978317°W	Class 5.5
26	Vienna Peak	10,223 ft 3116 m	1,764 ft 538 m	6.68 mi 10.75 km	43.85080°N 114.85340°W	Class 3
27	Redfish Peak	10,213 ft 3113 m	374 ft 114 m	1.23 mi 1.98 km	44.050203°N 114.990055°W	Class 3
28	Payette Peak	10,210 ft 3112 m	371 ft 113 m	1.33 mi 2.14 km	43.99216°N 114.987318°W	Class 2
29	Cirque Lake Peak	10,210 ft 3112 m	728 ft 222 m	1.39 mi 2.23 km	44.077949°N 115.050727°W	Class 4
30	Parks Peak	10,279 ft 3133 m	919 ft 280 m	2.78 mi 4.47 km	43.96698°N 114.932446°W	Class 3
31	Peak 10,205	10,203 ft 3110 m	305 ft 93 m	0.71 mi 1.14 km	43.9469°N 114.9788°W	Class 4
32	Warbonnet Peak	10,200 ft 3109 m	361 ft 110 m	0.17 mi 0.27 km	44.078865°N 115.053889°W	Class 5.7
33	Mount Regan	10,190 ft 3106 m	1,709 ft 521 m	1.9 mi 3.06 km	44.15978°N 115.061586°W	Class 4
34	Mount Underhill	10,161 ft 3097 m	787 ft 240 m	0.4 mi 0.64 km	44.053144°N 115.046103°W	Class 4
35	Peak 10,160	10,279 ft 3133 m	unknown	unknown		Class 3
36	Peak 10,129	10,128 ft 3087 m	949 ft 289 m	2.42 mi 3.89 km	43.8701°N 114.8936°W	Class 2
37	Peak 10,127	10,125 ft 3086 m	unknown	unknown		Class 2
38	Imogene Peak	10,125 ft 3086 m	843 ft 257 m	1.83 mi 2.95 km	43.993476°N 114.935191°W	Class 3
39	The Coffin	10,112 ft 3082 m	unknown	unknown	44.02891°N 114.97332°W	Class A1
40	Cirque Peak	10,105 ft 3080 m	unknown	unknown		Class 5.9 A1
41	Fishhook Spire	10,121 ft 3085 m	79 ft 24 m	0.32 mi 0.52 km	44.098965°N 114.997938°W	Class 5.5
42	Monte Verita	10,121 ft 3085 m	600 ft 183 m	0.57 mi 0.92 km	44.071629°N 115.043294°W	Class 4
43	Redfish Point	10,095 ft 3077 m	217 ft 66 m	0.43 mi 0.69 km	44.055168°N 114.995154°W	Class 4
44	Crown Point	10,085 ft 3074 m	40 ft 12 m	0.43 mi 0.69 km	44.16049°N 115.00728°W	Class 3
45	Perforated Pinnacle	10,082 ft 3073 m	40 ft 12 m	0.58 mi 0.93 km	44.0716°N 115.0433°W	Class 4
46	Goat Perch	10,082 ft 3073 m	322 ft 98 m	0.6 mi 0.96 km	44.056921°N 114.982545°W	Class 5.7
47	Mayan Temple	10,079 ft 3072 m	279 ft 85 m	0.29 mi 0.46 km	44.061053°N 115.04816°W	Class 4
48	Lions Head	10,075 ft 3071 m	unknown	unknown		Class 5.9
49	Reward Peak	10,075 ft 3071 m	230 ft 70 m	0.89 mi 1.43 km	44.035156°N 115.047068°W	Class 2
50	McDonald Peak	10,069 ft 3069 m	830 ft 253 m	1.93 mi 3.11 km	43.946195°N 114.906456°W	Class 3
51	Glens Peak	10,052 ft 3064 m	853 ft 260 m	2.17 mi 3.49 km	43.949795°N 115.011625°W	Class 2
52	Peak 10,052	10,049 ft 3063 m	662 ft 202 m	1.02 mi 1.64 km	43.9477°N 114.9556°W	Class 3
53	Tohobit Peak	10,046 ft 3062 m	886 ft 270 m	1.11 mi 1.79 km	44.091591°N 115.067646°W	Class 4
54	Leaning Tower of Pisa	10,039 ft 3060 m	unknown	unknown		Class A1
55	Schwartz Pinnacle	10,026 ft 3056 m	39 ft 12 m	0.4 mi 0.64 km	44.128709°N 115.019263°W	Class 4
56	Peak 10,027	10,026 ft 3056 m	687 ft 209 m	1.15 mi 1.85 km	43.9299°N 114.9110°W	Class 2
57	Tilted Slab Pinnacle	10,000 ft 3048 m	unknown	unknown		Class 5.3
58	Harriets Pinnacle	9,977 ft 3041 m	40 ft 12 m	5.4 mi 8.69 km	44.1277°N 115.0136°W	Class 5.4
59	Red Sentinel	9,977 ft 3041 m	40 ft 12 m	0.37 mi 0.6 km	44.0785°N 114.9993°W	Class 5.4 A1
60	Twin 9,980	9,977 ft 3041 m	unknown	unknown		Class 5
61	Plummer Peak	9,977 ft 3041 m	1,083 ft 330 m	3.24 mi 5.22 km	43.945943°N 115.07645°W	Class 3
62	North Raker	9,970 ft 3039 m	1,378 ft 420 m	3.7 mi 5.96 km	43.995288°N 115.105567°W	Class A2
63	Slide Peak	9,964 ft 3037 m	unknown	unknown		Class 3
64	Alpine Creek Lakes Peak	9,964 ft 3037 m	423 ft 129 m	1.51 mi 2.43 km	43.92151°N 114.99070°W	Class 2
65	Twin 9,960	9,957 ft 3035 m	unknown	unknown		Class 5
66	Abe's Armchair	9,957 ft 3035 m	39 ft 12 m	0.4 mi 0.64 km	43.86664°N 114.83448°W	Class 2
67	Benedict Peak	9,931 ft 3027 m	unknown	unknown	43.97000°N 115.05040°W	Class 3
68	Mattingly Peak	9,921 ft 3024 m	741 ft 226 m	2.15 mi 3.46 km	43.89140°N 115.00380°W	Class 3
69	Lunch Tower	9,902 ft 3018 m	40 ft 12 m	0.13 mi 0.21 km	44.0690°N 115.0420°W	Class 4
70	Dinner Tower	9,902 ft 3018 m	40 ft 12 m	0.05 mi 0.08 km	44.0701°N 115.0425°W	Class 5.2
71	La Fiamma	9,902 ft 3018 m	unknown	unknown		Class 5.6
72	El Capitan	9,902 ft 3018 m	436 ft 133 m	1.41 mi 2.27 km	43.941089°N 114.933829°W	Class 3
73	Mount Ebert	9,879 ft 3011 m	679 ft 207 m	1.31 mi 2.11 km	44.109065°N 115.0294°W	Class 5.4
74	South Raker	9,879 ft 3011 m	118 ft 36 m	0.19 mi 0.3 km	43.99302°N 115.103474°W	Class 4
75	Mount Bruce	9,872 ft 3009 m	120 ft 37 m	0.72 mi 1.16 km	44.12736°N 115.01052°W	Class 4
76	Little Decker	9,869 ft 3008 m	650 ft 198 m	1.47 mi 2.37 km	44.0662°N 114.9561°W	Class 3
77	Elephants Perch	9,967 ft 3038 m	249 ft 76 m	0.65 mi 1.04 km	44.072733°N 114.968686°W	Class 3
78	Rotten Monolith	9,869 ft 3008 m	160 ft 49 m	0.2 mi 0.32 km	44.0957°N 114.9942°W	Class A3
79	Alpine Peak	9,862 ft 3006 m	741 ft 226 m	0.99 mi 1.6 km	44.171406°N 115.049865°W	Class 2
80	McGowan Peak	9,859 ft 3005 m	1,099 ft 335 m	3.25 mi 5.23 km	44.212635°N 115.081547°W	Class 3
81	Mount Everly	9,852 ft 3003 m	1,214 ft 370 m	1.14 mi 1.83 km	43.957951°N 115.092005°W	Class 3
82	Old Decker	9,846 ft 3001 m	427 ft 130 m	0.7 mi 1.13 km	44.0563°N 114.9530°W	Class 4
83	Chipmunk Perch	9,839 ft 2999 m	80 ft 24 m	0.25 mi 0.4 km	44.0604°N 114.9815°W	Class 5.9
84	El Pima	9,836 ft 2998 m	236 ft 72 m	0.6 mi 0.97 km	44.084985°N 115.043538°W	Class A1
85	Mystery Mountain	9,820 ft 2993 m	600 ft 183 m	0.8 mi 1.29 km	44.20582°N 115.06840°W	Class 2
86	Blacknose Mountain	9,505 ft 2897 m	542 ft 165 m	1.5 mi 2.41 km	43.9745°N 115.1133°W	Class 3
87	Damocles	9,800 ft 2987 m	unknown	unknown		Class 5.3
88	Peak 9,978	9,797 ft 2986 m	378 ft 115 m	0.49 mi 0.79 km	43.9529°N 115.0743°W	Class 3
89	Monte Verita South	9,769 ft 2978 m	171 ft 52 m	0.44 mi 0.71 km	44.067196°N 115.036897°W	Class 3
90	Garden Peak	9,764 ft 2976 m	unknown	unknown	44.05486°N 115.08798°W	Class 3
91	Pyramid Peak	9,760 ft 2975 m	unknown	unknown		Class 5.8
92	Finger of Fate	9,757 ft 2974 m	95 ft 29 m	0.53 mi 0.85 km	44.025561°N 114.962873°W	Class 5.7
93	Peak 9,737	9,734 ft 2967 m	637 ft 194 m	2.49 mi 4.01 km	43.9204°N 115.0411°W	Class 5.8
94	Grand Mogul	9,734 ft 2967 m	335 ft 102 m	0.95 mi 1.53 km	44.079759°N 114.960053°W	Class 3
95	Peak 9,730	9,728 ft 2965 m	unknown	unknown		Class 5.8
96	Eagle's Beak	9,728 ft 2965 m	unknown	unknown	44.07683°N 115.01192°W	Class 5.3
97	Peak 9,722	9,760 ft 2975 m	462 ft 141 m	0.69 mi 1.11 km	43.9839°N 115.1089°W	Class ?
98	Peak 9,709	9,721 ft 2963 m	unknown	unknown		Class 2
99	Browns Peak	9,705 ft 2958 m	765 ft 233 m	2.66 mi 4.28 km	43.934238°N 115.134019°W	Class 3
100	Arvals Peak	9,705 ft 2958 m	unknown	unknown	43.96510°N 115.11990°W	Class 3
101	Mount Alpen	9,705 ft 2958 m	40 ft 12 m	0.2 mi 0.32 km		Class 3
102	Breakfast Tower	9,705 ft 2958 m	40 ft 12 m	0.2 mi 0.32 km	44.0682°N 115.0411°W	Class A2
103	Peak 9,704	9,701 ft 2957 m	484 ft 148 m	0.73 mi 1.17 km	43.9651°N 115.1200°W	Class 3
104	Quartzite Peak	9,682 ft 2951 m	382 ft 116 m	0.42 mi 0.68 km	44.0839°N 114.9936°W	Class 4
105	Silicon Tower	9,678 ft 2950 m	unknown	unknown		Class 5.9
106	Flat Top Mountain	9,665 ft 2946 m	763 ft 233 m	1.16 mi 1.87 km	43.91760°N 115.13480°W	Class 3
107	Peak 9,709	9,626 ft 2934 m	unknown	unknown		Class 3
108	Blizzard Mountain	9,606 ft 2928 m	1,228 ft 374 m	3.24 mi 5.21 km	43.87466°N 115.07845°W	Class 3
109	Cony Peak	9,606 ft 2928 m	266 ft 81 m	0.57 mi 0.92 km	44.06309°N 115.08970°W	Class 3
110	Mount Bush	9,600 ft 2926 m	200 ft 61 m	0.78 mi 1.26 km	44.127819°N 115.003591°W	Class 4
111	Cirque Lake Tower	9,600 ft 2926 m	unknown	unknown		Class 5.4
112	Nahneke Mountain	9,583 ft 2921 m	482 ft 147 m	1.68 mi 2.7 km	43.89320°N 115.13340°W	Class 3
113	West Nahneke	9,564 ft 2915 m	864 ft 263 m	0.5 mi 0.8 km	43.8941°N 115.1434°W	Class ?
114	Eagle Perch	9,560 ft 2914 m	157 ft 48 m	0.2 mi 0.32 km	44.059701°N 114.983351°W	Class 5.3
115	Scenic Peak 9,554	9,554 ft 2912 m	454 ft 138 m	0.64 mi 1.03 km	43.9087°N 115.1382°W	Class 3
116	Pinochot Mountain	9,501 ft 2896 m	unknown	unknown		Class 2
117	Dessert Tower	9,498 ft 2895 m	unknown	unknown		Class 4
118	South Alpine Peak	9,485 ft 2891 m	386 ft 118 m	0.9 mi 1.45 km	44.1593°N 115.0412°W	Class 2
119	Peak 9,482	9,482 ft 2890 m	unknown	unknown		Class ?
120	Stephens Spire	9,439 ft 2877 m	unknown	unknown		Class 5.1
121	Rothorn Spire	9,439 ft 2877 m	320 ft 98 m	0.8 mi 1.29 km	44.0991°N 115.0214°W	Class 5.7
122	Split Tooth	9,367 ft 2855 m	120 ft 37 m	0.66 mi 1.06 km	44.0910°N 114.9839°W	Class 5.7
123	Peak 9,367	9,367 ft 2855 m	867 ft 264 m	2.19 mi 3.52 km	43.85640°N 114.79320°W	Class 3
124	Greylock Mountain	9,364 ft 2854 m	663 ft 202 m	2.28 mi 3.67 km	43.84411°N 115.09581°W	Class 3
125	Grand Aiguille	9,344 ft 2848 m	unknown	unknown		Class 5.4
126	Ed-Da-How Spire	9,331 ft 2844 m	73 ft 22 m	0.39 mi 0.63 km	44.1036°N 115.0260°W	Class 5.2
127	Kelly Point	9,321 ft 2841 m	unknown	unknown	44.26487°N 115.16448°W	Class 2
128	Chockstone Peak	9,318 ft 2840 m	220 ft 67 m	0.88 mi 1.42 km	44.0644°N 114.9969°W	Class 4
129	Rainy Day Pinnacle	9,281 ft 2829 m	unknown	unknown		Class 5.10
130	Blue Rock Dome	9,242 ft 2817 m	unknown	unknown		Class 5.10
131	Baron Spire	9,209 ft 2807 m	unknown	unknown	44.09270°N 115.03900°W	Class 5.9 A1
132	Black Aiguille	9,196 ft 2803 m	unknown	unknown		Class 5.2
133	Small Aiguille	9,157 ft 2791 m	unknown	unknown		Class 5.4
134	Observation Peak	9,150 ft 2789 m	709 ft 216 m	2.5 mi 4.02 km	44.170929°N 115.109417°W	Class 1
135	Grandjean East	9,144 ft 2787 m	679 ft 207 m	2.52 mi 4.05 km	44.11280°N 115.09690°W	Class 5.7
136	Grandjean West	9,104 ft 2775 m	unknown	unknown		Class 3
137	King Spire	8,980 ft 2737 m	unknown	unknown		Class 5.10R
138	Copper Mountain	8,967 ft 2733 m	426 ft 130 m	2 mi 3.22 km	44.33200°N 115.20100°W	Class 2
139	Baron Falls Tower	8,960 ft 2731 m	unknown	unknown		Class 5.10
140	Peak 8,952	8,950 ft 2728 m	332 ft 101 m	0.66 mi 1.06 km	43.9091°N 115.1249°W	Class 5.?
141	Peak 8,901	8,901 ft 2713 m	304 ft 93 m	0.98 mi 1.58 km	44.0178°N 115.0846°W	Class ?
142	Dark Knight Spire	8,839 ft 2694 m	unknown	unknown		Class 5.9+
143	Mount Zumwalt	8,816 ft 2687 m	956 ft 291 m	2.73 mi 4.39 km	44.1997°N 115.2018°W	Class 2
144	Serf Spire	8,773 ft 2674 m	unknown	unknown		Class 5.6
145	The Jester	8,760 ft 2670 m	unknown	unknown		Class 5.9
146	Queen Spire	8,491 ft 2588 m	unknown	unknown		Class 5.8
147	Super Slab	7,861 ft 2396 m	unknown	unknown	44.08570°N 114.97990°W	Class 5.5
148	Payette Pinnacle	7,254 ft 2211 m	unknown	unknown		Class 5.5

== See also ==
- List of mountains of Idaho
- List of mountain peaks of Idaho
- List of mountain ranges in Idaho

== Notes ==
1. Baron Spire collapsed following a 4.2 magnitude earthquake in August 2020.
