= Mickey's Spire =

Mountain in Idaho, United States

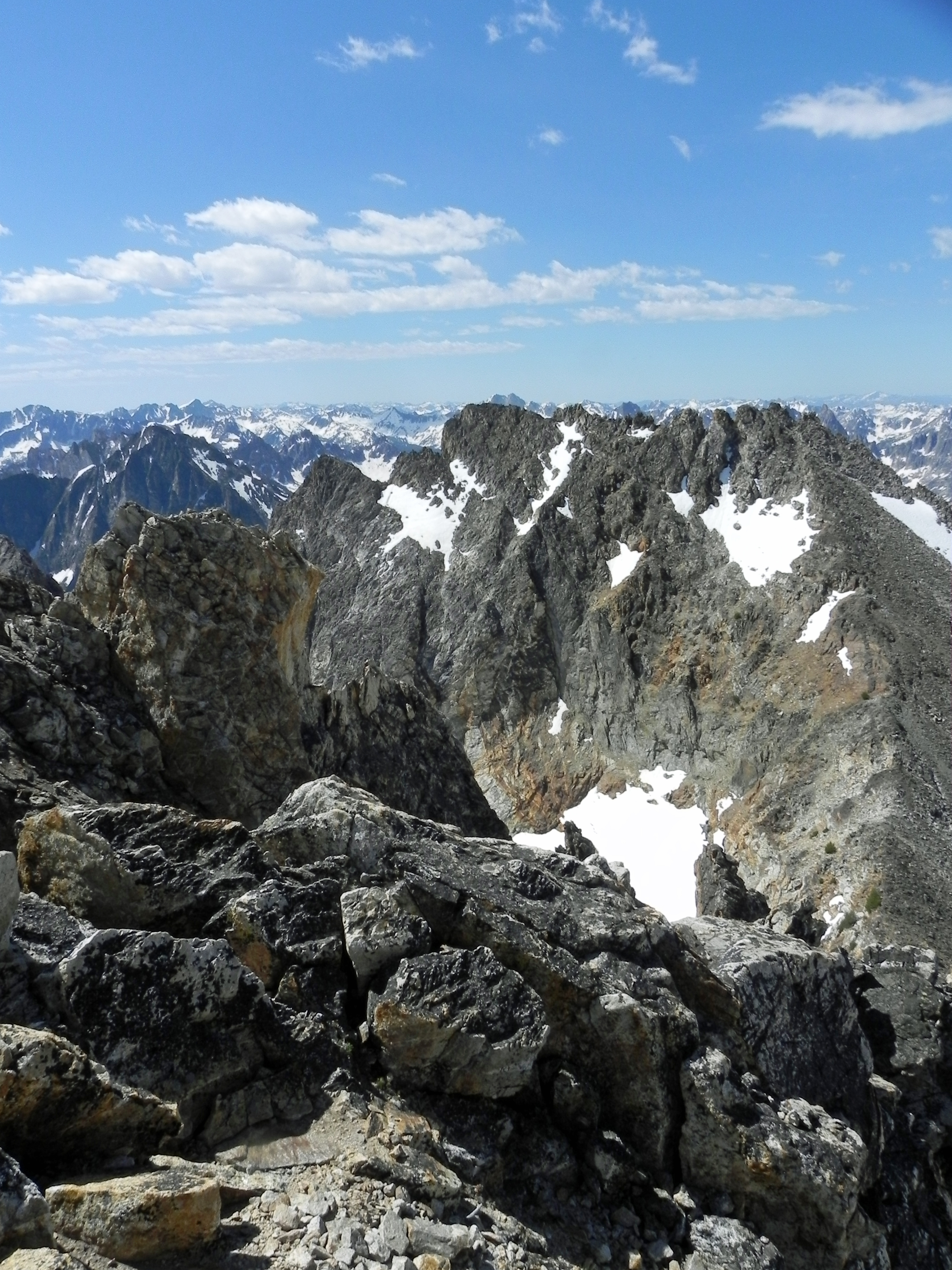
- Mickey's Spire viewed from Thompson Peak

Highest point
- Elevation: 10,680 ft (3,260 m)
- Prominence: 280 ft (85 m)
- Parent peak: Thompson Peak
- Coordinates: 44°08′18″N 115°00′44″W

Geography
- Location within Idaho
- Location: Custer County, Idaho, U.S.
- Parent range: Sawtooth Range
- Topo map: USGS Stanley Lake

Climbing
- First ascent: 1934
- Easiest route: Scramble, class 3-4

Mickey's Spire, at 10,680 feet (3,260 m) above sea level is the fourth highest peak in the Sawtooth Range of Idaho. The peak is located in the Sawtooth Wilderness of Sawtooth National Recreation Area in Custer County. The peak is located 0.24 mi (0.39 km) south-southwest of Thompson Peak, its line parent. It is the 206th highest peak in Idaho.

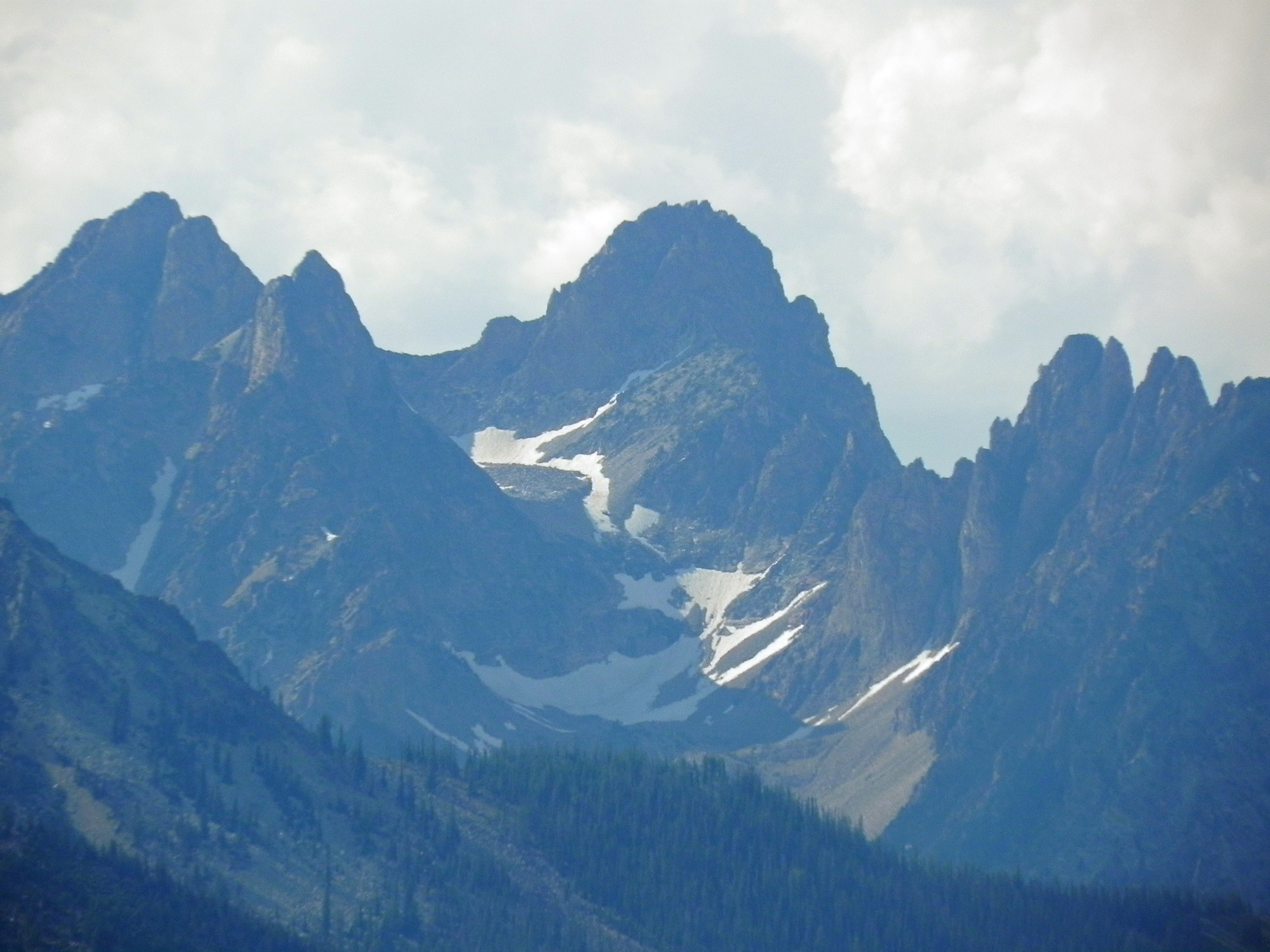
Mickey's Spire (left) and Thompson Peak (center)

== See also ==
- List of peaks of the Sawtooth Range (Idaho)
- List of mountains of Idaho
- List of mountain peaks of Idaho
- List of mountain ranges in Idaho
