= Primitive Area =

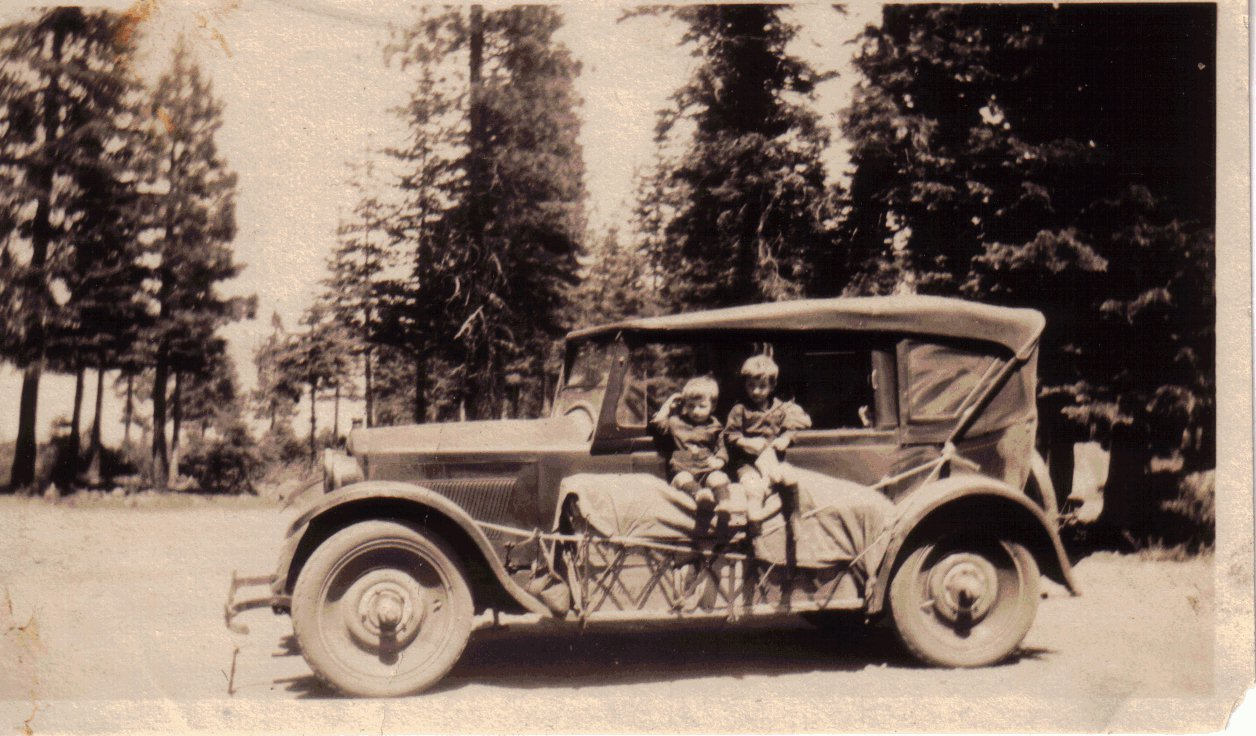
Car camping - Not allowed in Primitive Areas

A Primitive Area is a land designation previously used by the United States Forest Service. Although there are still lands with this title, most are now known as wilderness areas. The Forest Service began this new designation in 1929 with the L-20 regulations.

The L-20 regulations defined three types of areas: Natural Area, Experimental Forest and Range, and Primitive Area. The L-20 section on Primitive Area read, "to maintain primitive conditions of transportation, subsistence, habitation, and environment to the fullest degree compatible with their highest public use." as stated by M. Rupert Cutler, in a briefing before the Subcommittee on Public Lands of the Committee on Interior and Insular Affairs, U.S. House of Representatives on July 24. 1979.

The US Forest Service, along with preservationist Bob Marshall, continued to add acreage to the fledgling wilderness system.

[Marshall's] total acreage recommendation to the Forest Service for

primitive classification was almost three times more than the Service was willing or able to set aside. Areas in which the Park Service had shown a special interest, however, were almost all formally classified as primitive areas—even those under 100,000 acres (400 km^{2}) in the West which

were not of special interest to Marshall.

Stricter regulations for these new protected areas began in 1939 from Bob Marshall's efforts. This resulted in the "U-Regulations" as they came to be known. The U-Regulations superseded the L-20 Regulations and created two types of areas. Regulation U-1 created Wilderness Areas (over 100,000 acres). Regulation U-2 created Wild Areas (5,000 to 100,000 acres). The U Regulations prohibited mechanized access, timber harvesting and road construction in the wilderness and wild areas. The U-Regulations replaced the term primitive area with wilderness area and wild area and were used by the Forest Service until the passage of the federal Wilderness Act of 1964.

The Wilderness Act gave federal protection to these US Forest Service administrative areas and created the National Wilderness Preservation System.
