= Sawtooth Fault =

Geological fault in Idaho, U.S.

The Sawtooth Fault is an east-dipping normal fault (vertical motion) which runs along the eastern base of the Sawtooth Mountains in the state of Idaho in the United States.

In 2010, Glenn Thackray and colleagues from Idaho State University discovered the Sawtooth Fault near the base of the mountains using LIDAR. They found that it could produce an earthquake measuring up to magnitude 7.5 and that two past large earthquakes likely took place on the fault around 7,000 and 4,000 years ago. The fault is 40 mi (64 km) long, and runs near Stanley, Idaho, and Redfish Lake. Future earthquakes could be felt as far as Boise.

On March 31, 2020, the 6.5 magnitude 2020 Central Idaho earthquake struck about 16 km north-northeast of the Sawtooth Fault. However, this quake is likely not on the Sawtooth Fault as it had strike-slip motion rather than up-down motion of a normal fault.
