= Thompson Peak (Idaho) =

Mountain in the state of Idaho

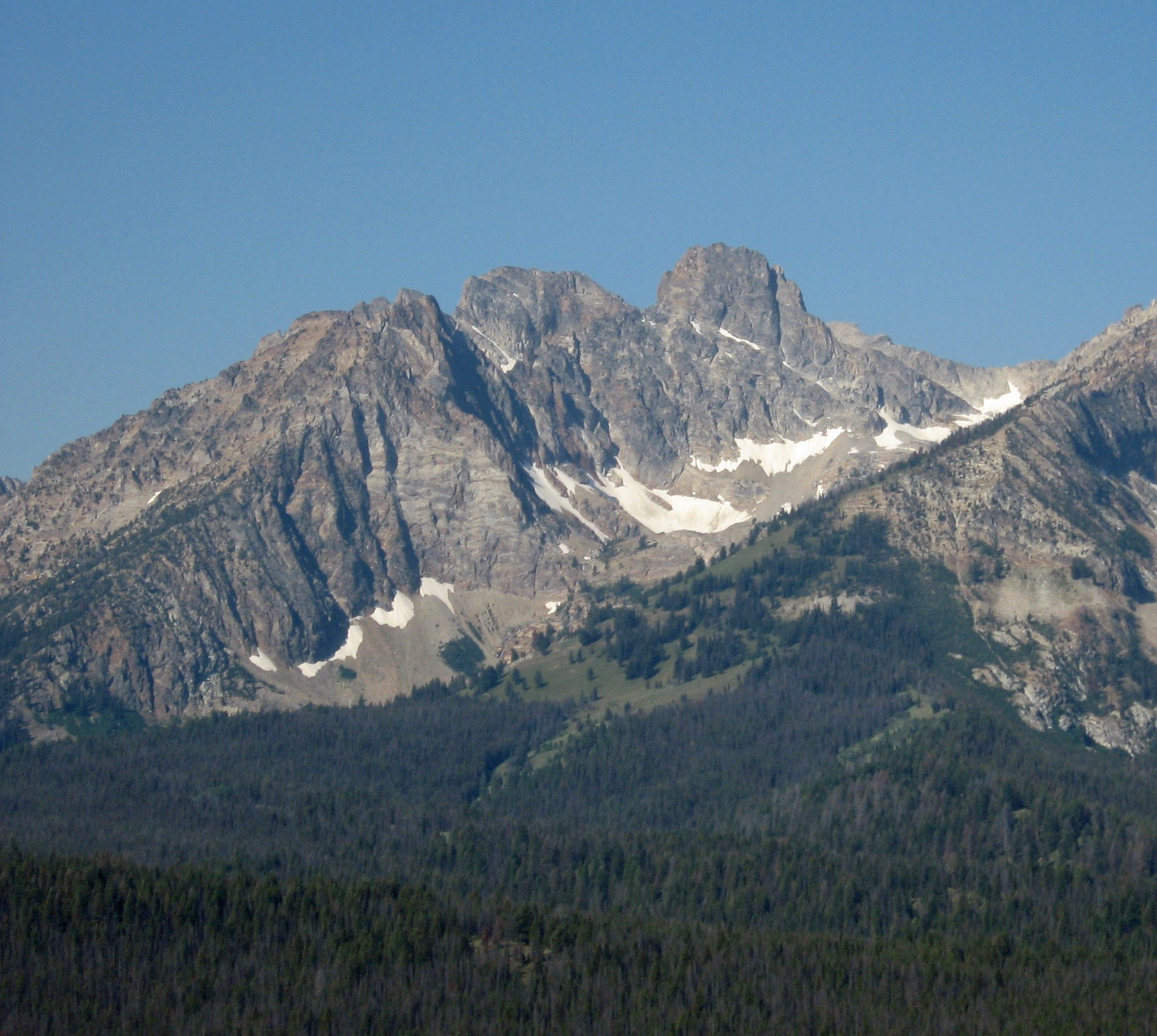
- Thompson Peak from near Stanley

Highest point
- Elevation: 10,751 ft (3,277 m) NAVD 88
- Prominence: 2,431 ft (741 m)
- Coordinates: 44°08′30″N 115°00′36″W

Geography
- Location within Idaho
- Location: Custer County, Idaho, U.S.
- Parent range: Sawtooth Range
- Topo map: USGS Stanley Lake

Climbing
- Easiest route: Hike, Scramble, class 3

Thompson Peak is the highest peak in the Sawtooth Range of Idaho. Its 10,751 ft (3,277 m) summit is located within Custer County, although some of the lower portion of the mountain is in Boise County. Thompson Peak is also located within the Sawtooth Wilderness portion of the Sawtooth National Recreation Area, a unit of Sawtooth National Forest. The town of Stanley, Idaho is about 6 miles (9.7 km) northeast of Thompson Peak.

Redfish Lake, Little Redfish Lake, and the visitor services at these locations are only a few miles from Thompson Peak. Directly to the north is neighboring Williams Peak, while Mickey's Spire is 0.24 miles (0.39 km) to the south-southwest.

There are a total of four routes to the top of Thompson Peak: South Couloir - class 3, Southwest Couloir - 5.2, Northeast Face - 5.8, West Crack - 5.2. The easiest way to access Thompson Peak is from the Redfish Lake trailhead and to take the Fishhook Creek Trail to the Alpine Way Trail. From there, follow the Alpine Way Trail to the base of Williams Peak before going off trail up to an unnamed lake to the northeast of Thompson Peak. Then, head up to the saddle between Thompson and Williams Peaks before making the class 3 scramble on the west-southwest side of the peak that begins on the Thompson-Mickey's Spire saddle.

View from the summit

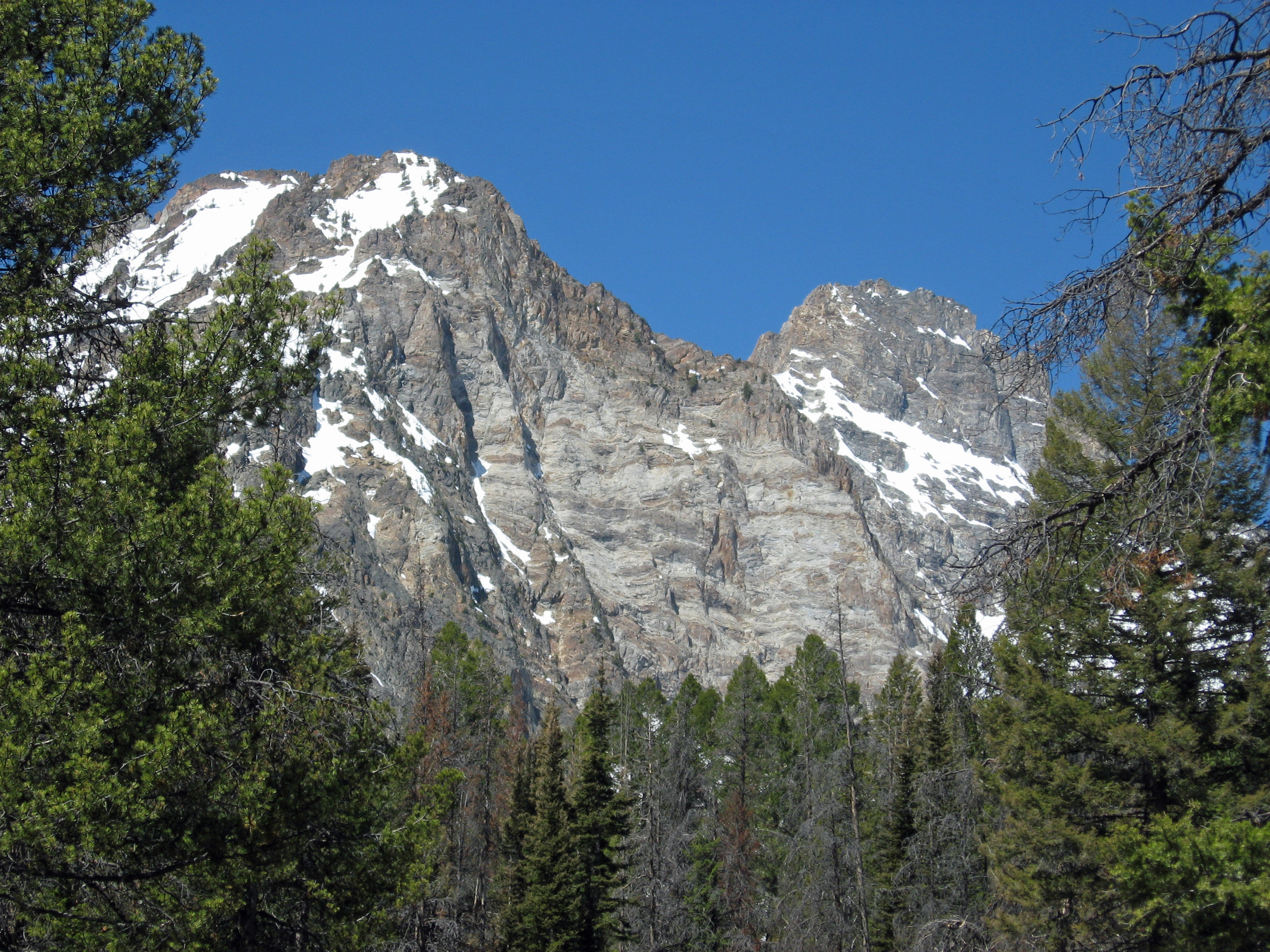
Thompson Peak from Alpine Way Trail

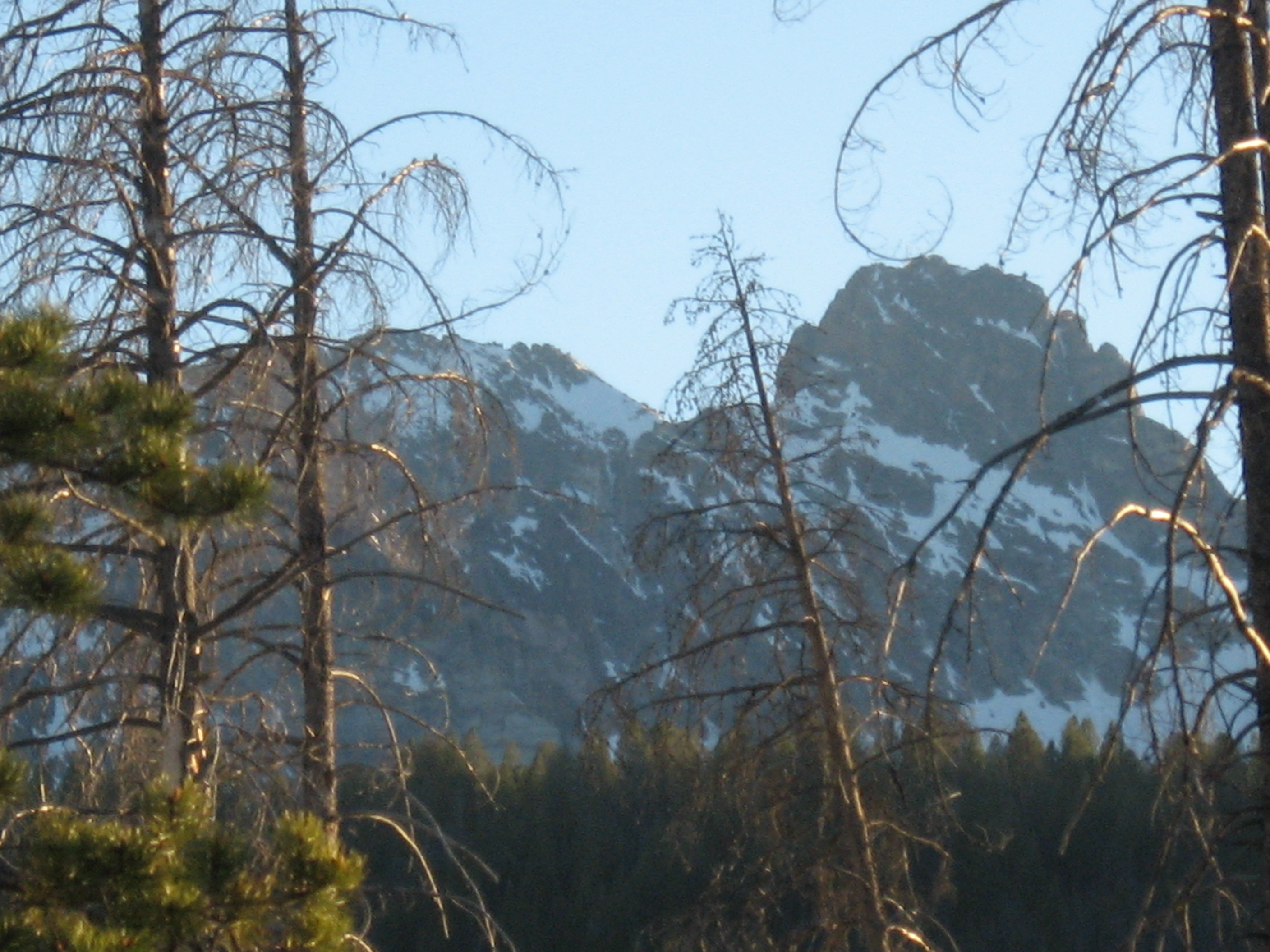
Thompson Peak from near Stanley Ranger Station

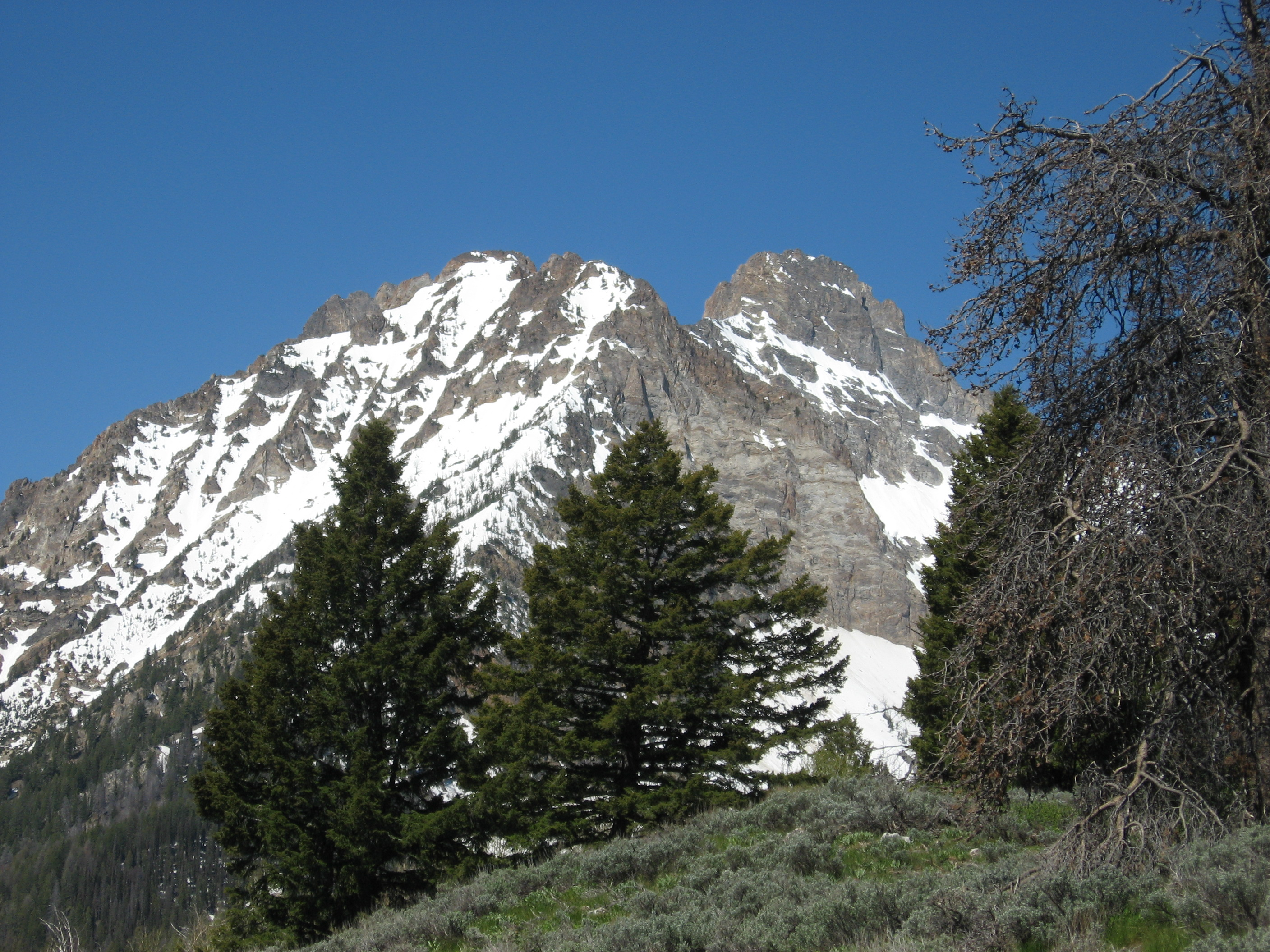
Thompson Peak as seen from Alpine Way Trail

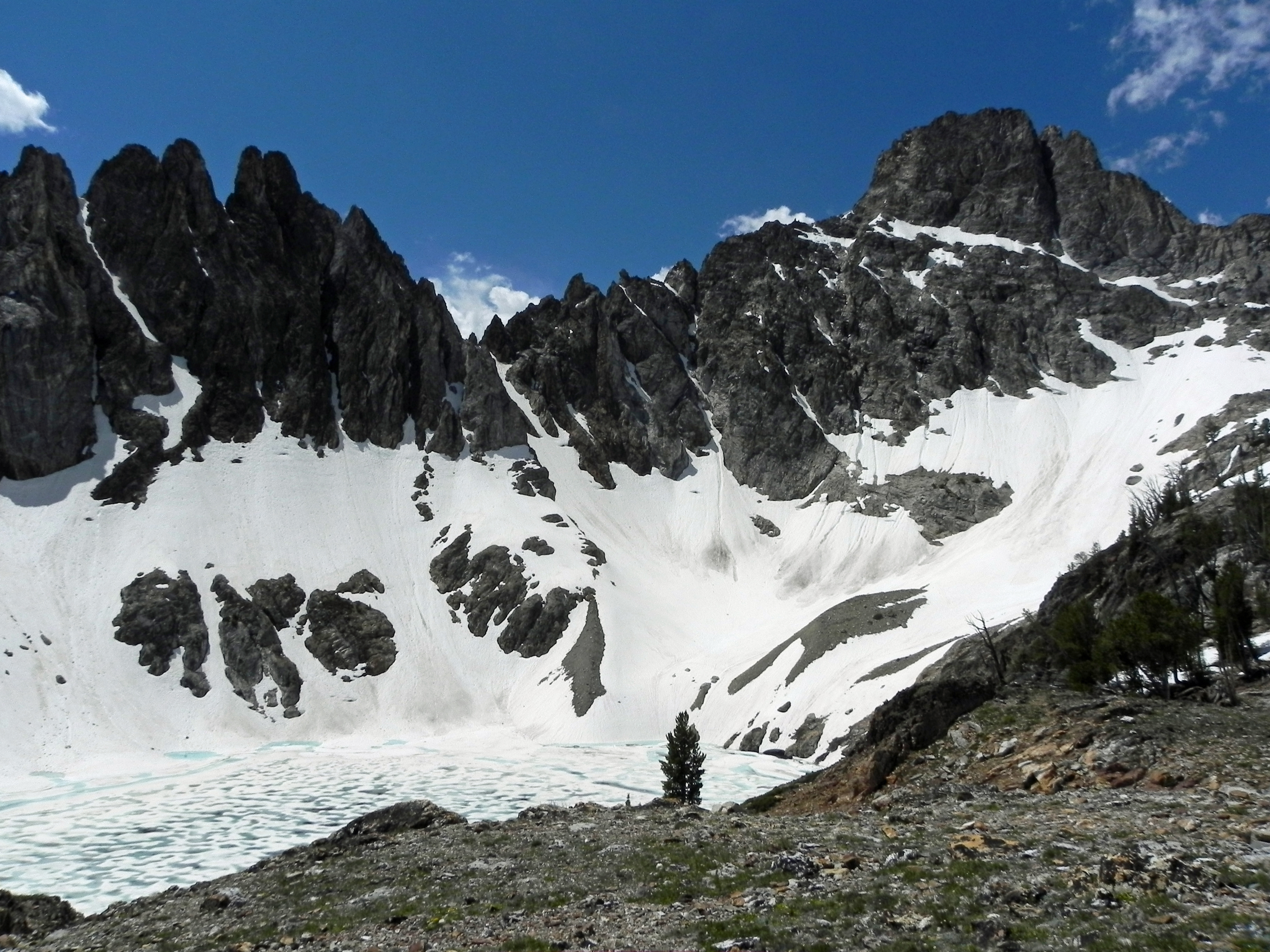
Thompson Peak from cirque below

== See also ==
- List of peaks of the Sawtooth Range (Idaho)
- List of mountains of Idaho
- List of mountain peaks of Idaho
- List of mountain ranges in Idaho
