= Sawtooth Wilderness =

Wilderness area in the state of Idaho

- IUCN category Ib (wilderness area)
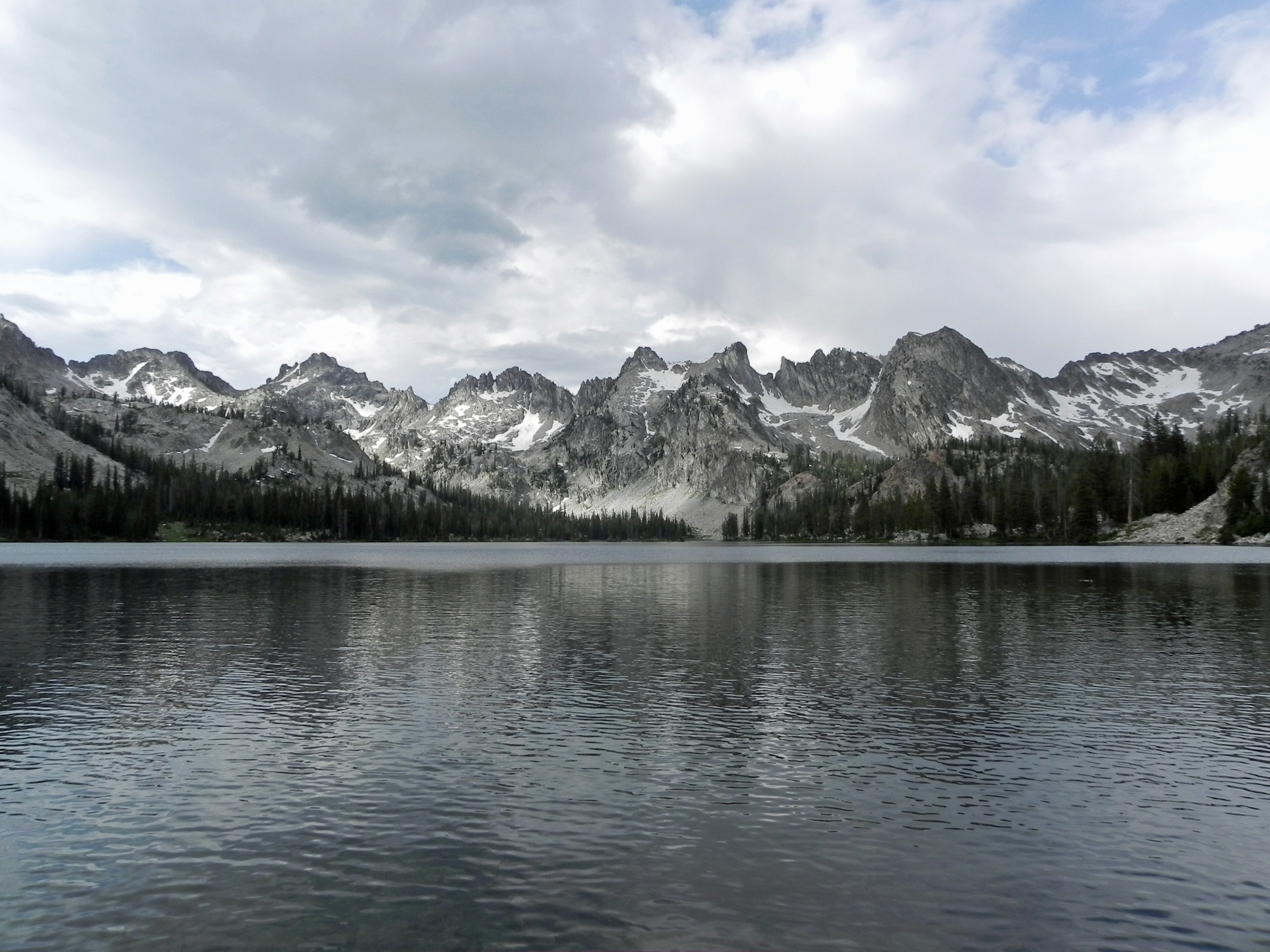
- Alice Lake in the Sawtooth Wilderness

- Location within the United States
- Location: Blaine, Boise, Custer, and Elmore counties, Idaho, United States
- Nearest city: Stanley, ID
- Coordinates: 43°59′59″N 115°03′57″W
- Area: 217,088 acres (878.52 km^{2})
- Established: August 22, 1972
- Visitors: 32,500 (in 2005)
- Governing body: U.S. Forest Service
- Website: Official website

The Sawtooth Wilderness is a federally-protected wilderness area that covers 217,088 acres (87,852 ha) of the state of Idaho. Managed by the U.S. Forest Service in the U.S. Department of Agriculture, it was designated the Sawtooth Primitive Area in 1937 to preserve the scenic beauty of the Sawtooth Mountains. On August 22, 1972 Public Law 92-400 designated the Primitive Area as the Sawtooth Wilderness and part of the newly created Sawtooth National Recreation Area. As part of the National Wilderness Preservation System, the Sawtooth Wilderness is an area where human development and use are restricted and people are to remain only visitors. According to the United States Environmental Protection Agency, the Sawtooth Wilderness has some of the clearest air in the lower 48 states.

== History ==
Sawtooth National Forest was created as the Sawtooth Forest Reserve in the U.S. Department of Agriculture by proclamation of President Theodore Roosevelt on May 29, 1905. It was named after the Sawtooth Mountains in the northwestern part of the forest. On October 12, 1937, the U.S. Forest Service established the Sawtooth Primitive Area in the Sawtooth Mountains. Subsequently, Sawtooth National Forest began to extensively develop recreation opportunities, including new campgrounds, trails, and roads.

In 1960, Frank Church, a U.S. Senator from Idaho, first introduced legislation for a feasibility study to study the area for national park status. While Church allowed the 1960 feasibility study legislation to die, he introduced a bill in 1963 to create Sawtooth Wilderness National Park, which would primarily encompass the existing Sawtooth Primitive Area. While the 1963 bill also died, Church admitted that it wasn't designed to pass but rather to encourage thorough feasibility studies by both the Forest Service and National Park Service. Support for greater protection of the Sawtooths and surrounding areas grew after the discovery of a molybdenum deposit at the base of Castle Peak in the White Cloud Mountains in 1968.

In March 1971 Idaho's congressional delegation was finally united and introduced legislation to create the SNRA. On August 22, 1972 Public Law 92-400 establishing the SNRA, covering 756,019 acres (305,950 ha), and banning mining in it passed both the House of Representatives and Senate and was signed into law by President Richard Nixon. As part of this legislation, the Sawtooth Primitive Area became the Sawtooth Wilderness covering 217,088 acres (87,852 ha) and part of the National Wilderness Preservation System under the Wilderness Act of 1964. The SNRA was dedicated in a ceremony held on the shores of Redfish Lake on September 1, 1972.

== Management ==
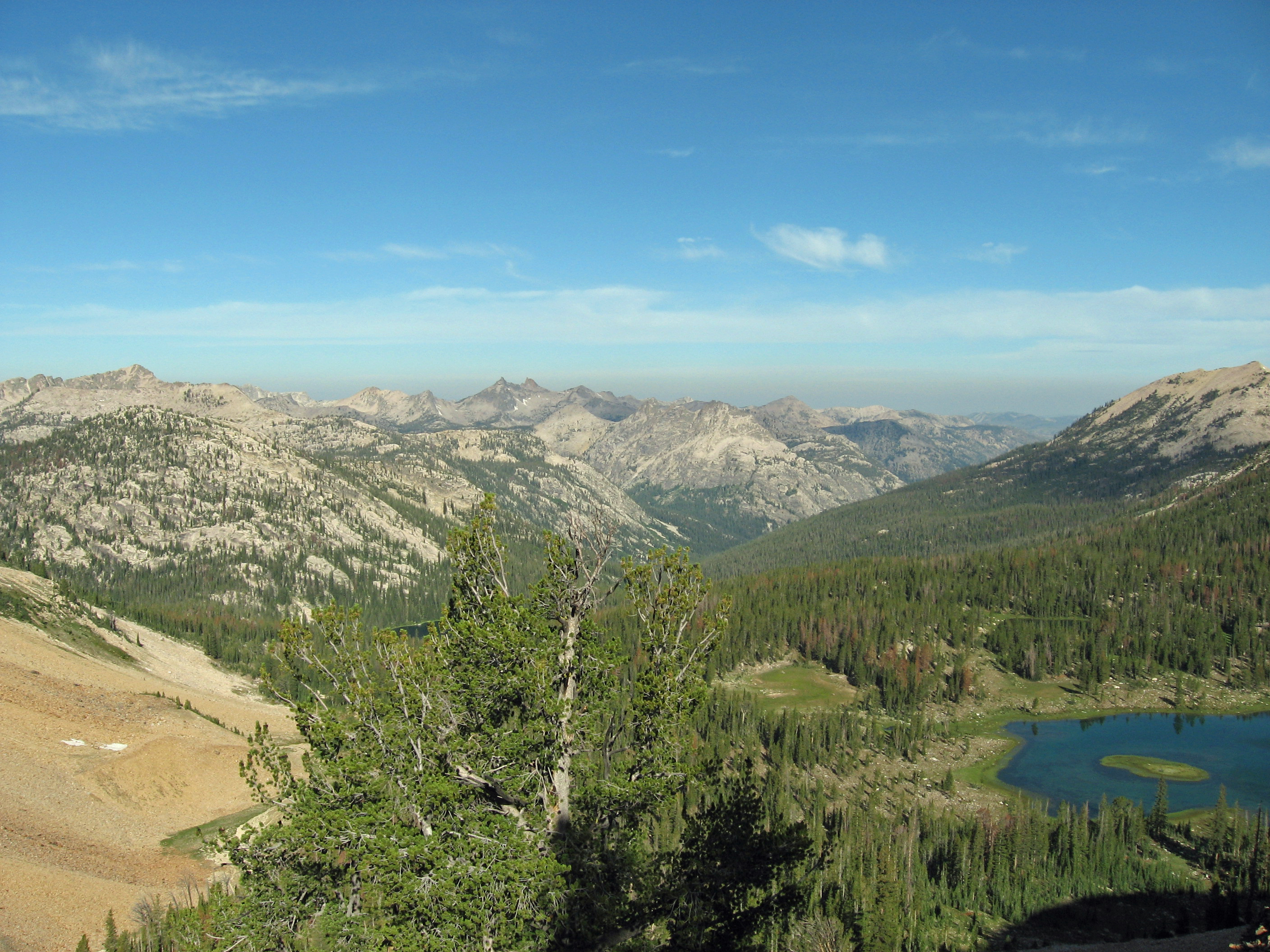
South Fork of the Payette River Valley and Rendezvous Lake

The Sawtooth Wilderness is managed by Sawtooth National Recreation Area, which is a division of Sawtooth National Forest. However, the wilderness encompasses land that was originally part of three National Forests: 150,071 acres (607.32 km^{2}) in Boise National Forest, 12,020 acres (48.6 km^{2}) in Challis National Forest, and 54,997 acres (222.56 km^{2}) in Sawtooth National Forest.

The Wilderness Act of 1964 enhanced the protection status of remote or undeveloped land already contained within federally administered protected areas. Passage of the act ensured that no human improvements would take place aside from those already existing. The protected status in wilderness-designated zones prohibits road and building construction, oil and mineral exploration or extraction, and logging, and also prohibits the use of motorized equipment, including bicycles. The only manner in which people can enter wilderness areas is either on foot or horseback. Hunting and fishing are permitted in the wilderness, just as they are throughout the SNRA, provided those engaging in such activities have the proper licenses and permits. Fires and stock are prohibited in certain high-use areas of the wilderness.

== Recreation ==
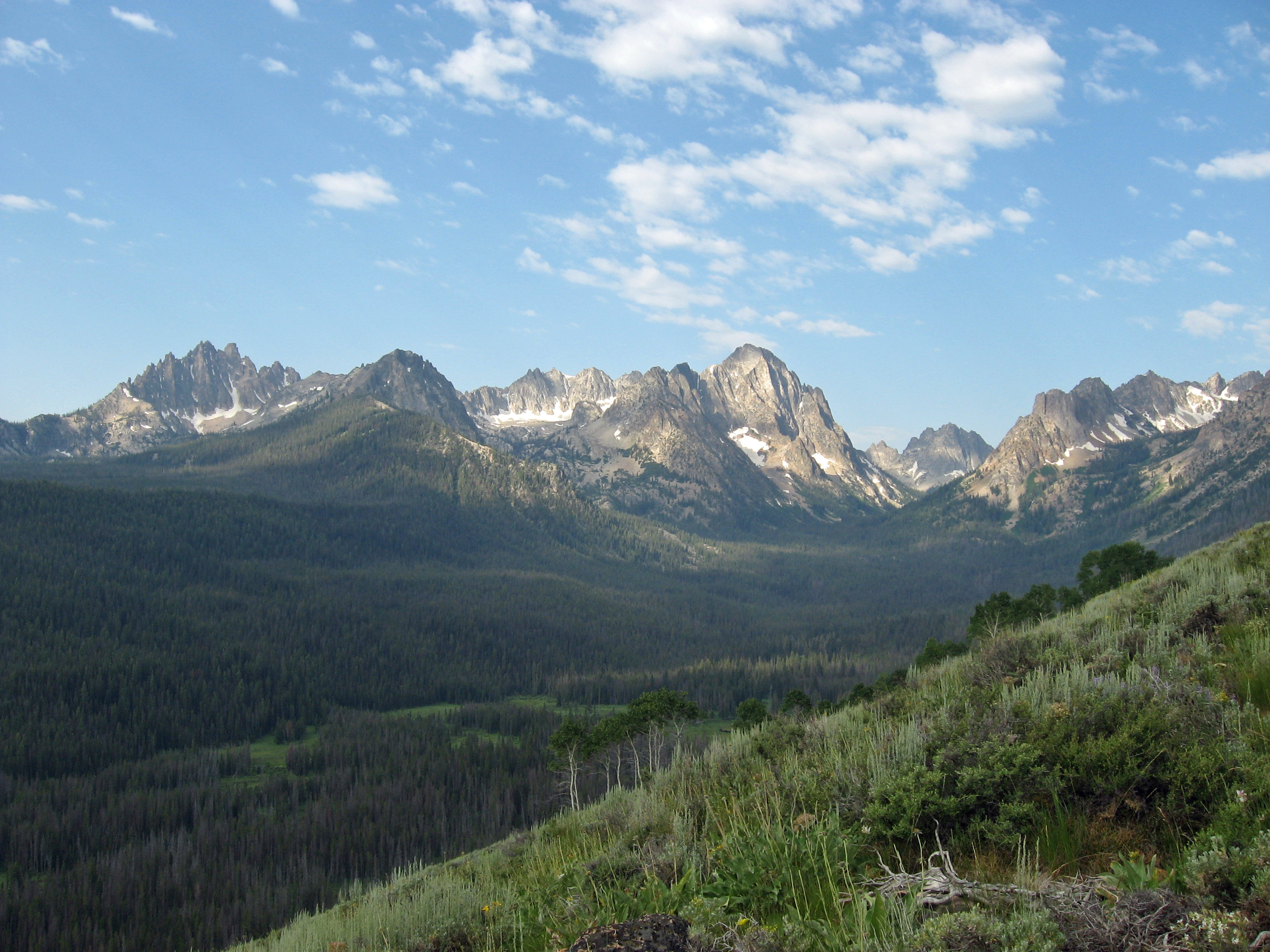
Sawtooth Mountains from the Alpine Way Trail

Wilderness areas do not allow motorized or mechanical equipment, including bicycles. Although camping and fishing are allowed with proper permit, no roads or buildings are constructed, and there is also no logging or mining. Hunting is permitted during the appropriate hunting seasons. Hunting and fishing licenses are available from the state of Idaho through the Idaho Department of Fish and Game. There are 40 trails totaling nearly 350 miles (560 km) in the wilderness that can be used for day hiking, backpacking, and horseback riding and accessed from 23 trailheads. Most of these trails were constructed or reconstructed in the 1960s. Mountain climbing, rock climbing, snowshoeing, and backcountry downhill skiing are activities that are also permitted in the wilderness. The closest town to the wilderness is Stanley at the northern end of the Sawtooth Valley, but the communities of Atlanta and Sawtooth City also provide access to the wilderness.

== Geography and geology ==
=== Mountains ===
The Sawtooth Wilderness encompasses the Sawtooth Mountains, which are part of the Rocky Mountains. The Sawtooth Mountains have at least 50 peaks over 10,000 ft (3,000 m) high, including Thompson Peak, the highest point in the range and the wilderness at 10,751 ft (3,277 m). The second highest point in Mount Cramer. The northern Sawtooth Mountains formed from the Eocene Sawtooth batholith, while south of Alturas Lake the Sawtooth Mountains formed from the Cretaceous granodiorite of the Idaho Batholith.

=== Waterways ===
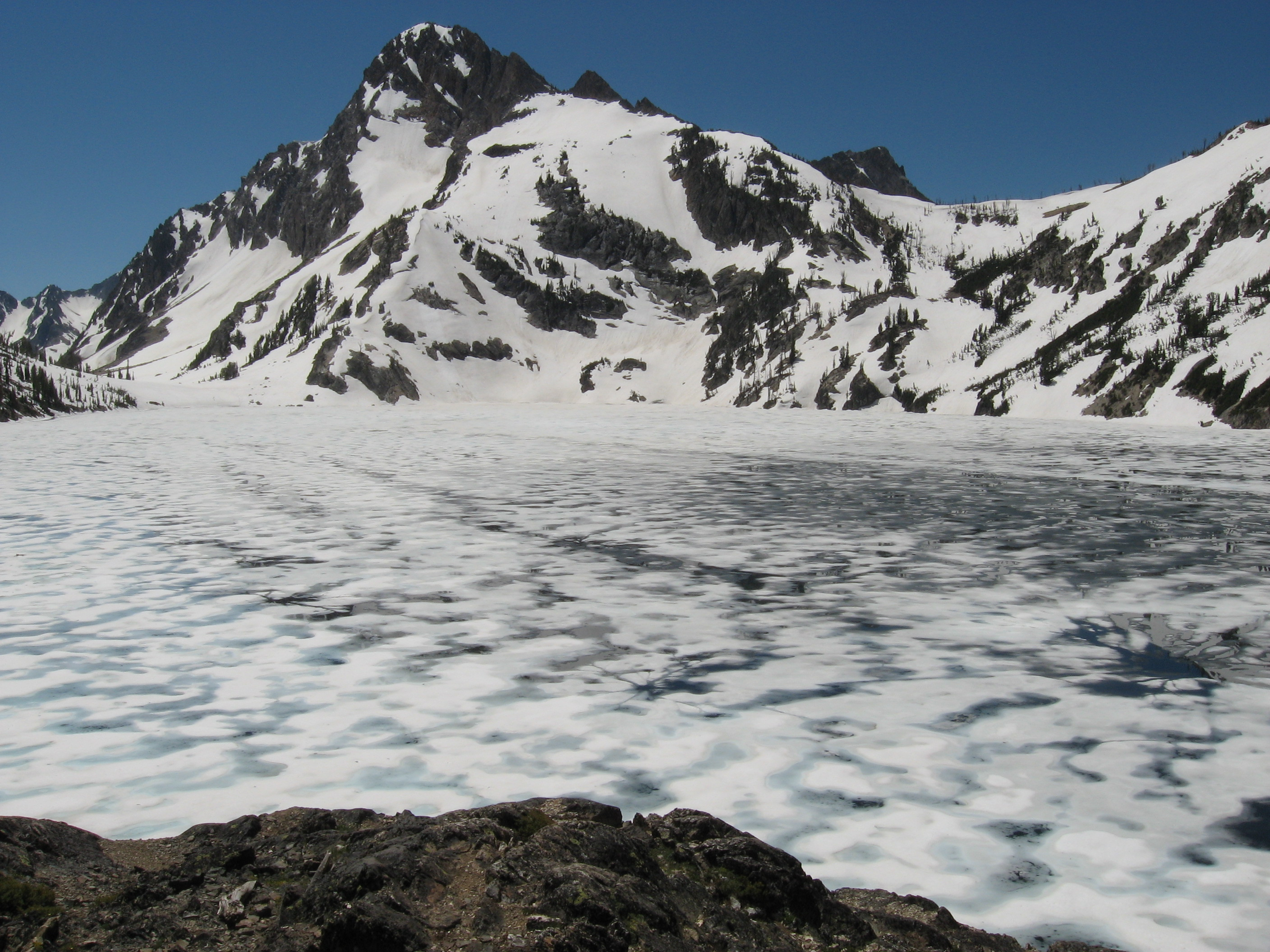
Sawtooth Lake and Mount Regan in June 2008

The entire wilderness is in the watershed of the Snake River, a tributary of the Columbia River, which flows into the Pacific Ocean. The eastern side of the wilderness is drained by Salmon River, which flows into the Snake River 425 miles (684 km) downstream. The western side of the wilderness is in the watershed of the South Fork of the Payette River, while part of the southern end of the wilderness is drained by the Boise River. Several hundred lakes exist in the Sawtooth Wilderness, and nearly all are the result of glaciation. The largest lake in the wilderness is Sawtooth Lake, and other large lakes include Alice, Toxaway, Ardeth, Edna, Hell Roaring, Goat, and Baron lakes. Lakes in the wilderness can remain frozen until mid-summer, and many of the smaller lakes are unnamed.

=== Seismology ===
The Sawtooth Fault is a 40 mi (64 km) long east-dipping normal fault that runs along the base of the Sawtooth Mountains and was discovered and mapped in 2010. It is believed to be capable of producing an earthquake measuring up to 7.5 on the Richter magnitude scale, with one of the most recent large earthquakes occurring 4,000 years ago and a second 7,000 years ago.

=== Glaciology ===
The Sawtooth Wilderness has a history of alpine glaciation, and while no surface glaciers exist today, perennial snow fields and rock glaciers remain, usually on north or east facing slopes. There have been 202 perennial snow fields mapped in the Sawtooth Mountains. The Sawtooth Mountains were last extensively glaciated in the Pleistocene, but glaciers probably existed during the Little Ice Age, which ended around AD 1850. Remnants of glacial activity include glacial lakes, moraines, horns, hanging valleys, cirques, and arêtes.

=== Climate ===
Graham Guard Station is by the North Fork Boise River, on the far western edge of the Sawtooth Wilderness. Graham Guard Station has a humid continental climate (Köppen Dfb), with subalpine climate (Köppen Dfc) characteristics. The temperatures at Graham Guard Station have a high degree of diurnal variation throughout the year, with the temperatures at night remaining cold throughout the year, with no months where the average low exceeds 40 °F (4.4 °C). Daytime temperatures in winter are relatively mild, with the average high temperature ranging between 39 °F (3.9 °C) and 45 °F (7.2 °C), but the temperature drops drastically at night, reaching far below freezing. The level of diurnal temperature variation is similar to that of Bodie, California.

Climate data for Graham Guard Station, Idaho, 1991–2020 normals, 1988-2020 extremes: 5690ft (1734m)
Month	Jan	Feb	Mar	Apr	May	Jun	Jul	Aug	Sep	Oct	Nov	Dec	Year
Record high °F (°C)	65 (18)	67 (19)	74 (23)	85 (29)	87 (31)	96 (36)	100 (38)	98 (37)	95 (35)	85 (29)	70 (21)	63 (17)	100 (38)
Mean maximum °F (°C)	58.1 (14.5)	61.4 (16.3)	67.5 (19.7)	72.8 (22.7)	77.3 (25.2)	84.8 (29.3)	92.3 (33.5)	91.1 (32.8)	86.0 (30.0)	74.8 (23.8)	62.4 (16.9)	55.0 (12.8)	93.4 (34.1)
Mean daily maximum °F (°C)	42.0 (5.6)	45.2 (7.3)	50.9 (10.5)	55.2 (12.9)	61.8 (16.6)	69.3 (20.7)	81.0 (27.2)	80.6 (27.0)	71.5 (21.9)	57.5 (14.2)	45.5 (7.5)	39.7 (4.3)	58.4 (14.6)
Daily mean °F (°C)	25.2 (−3.8)	27.6 (−2.4)	33.6 (0.9)	39.1 (3.9)	46.3 (7.9)	52.3 (11.3)	60.0 (15.6)	59.1 (15.1)	51.8 (11.0)	41.3 (5.2)	31.0 (−0.6)	24.0 (−4.4)	40.9 (5.0)
Mean daily minimum °F (°C)	8.3 (−13.2)	9.9 (−12.3)	16.3 (−8.7)	22.9 (−5.1)	30.7 (−0.7)	35.1 (1.7)	39.0 (3.9)	37.5 (3.1)	31.8 (−0.1)	25.1 (−3.8)	16.5 (−8.6)	8.3 (−13.2)	23.5 (−4.7)
Mean minimum °F (°C)	−15.9 (−26.6)	−11.3 (−24.1)	−3.9 (−19.9)	8.1 (−13.3)	20.0 (−6.7)	26.0 (−3.3)	30.5 (−0.8)	28.3 (−2.1)	20.7 (−6.3)	10.5 (−11.9)	−5.5 (−20.8)	−13.8 (−25.4)	−19.7 (−28.7)
Record low °F (°C)	−29 (−34)	−29 (−34)	−18 (−28)	−6 (−21)	12 (−11)	20 (−7)	24 (−4)	14 (−10)	8 (−13)	−9 (−23)	−21 (−29)	−39 (−39)	−39 (−39)
Average precipitation inches (mm)	4.47 (114)	3.31 (84)	3.22 (82)	2.69 (68)	2.25 (57)	1.71 (43)	0.54 (14)	0.52 (13)	1.04 (26)	2.38 (60)	3.89 (99)	4.95 (126)	30.97 (786)
Source 1: XMACIS2
Source 2: NOAA (precipitation)

== Natural Resources ==
=== Flora ===
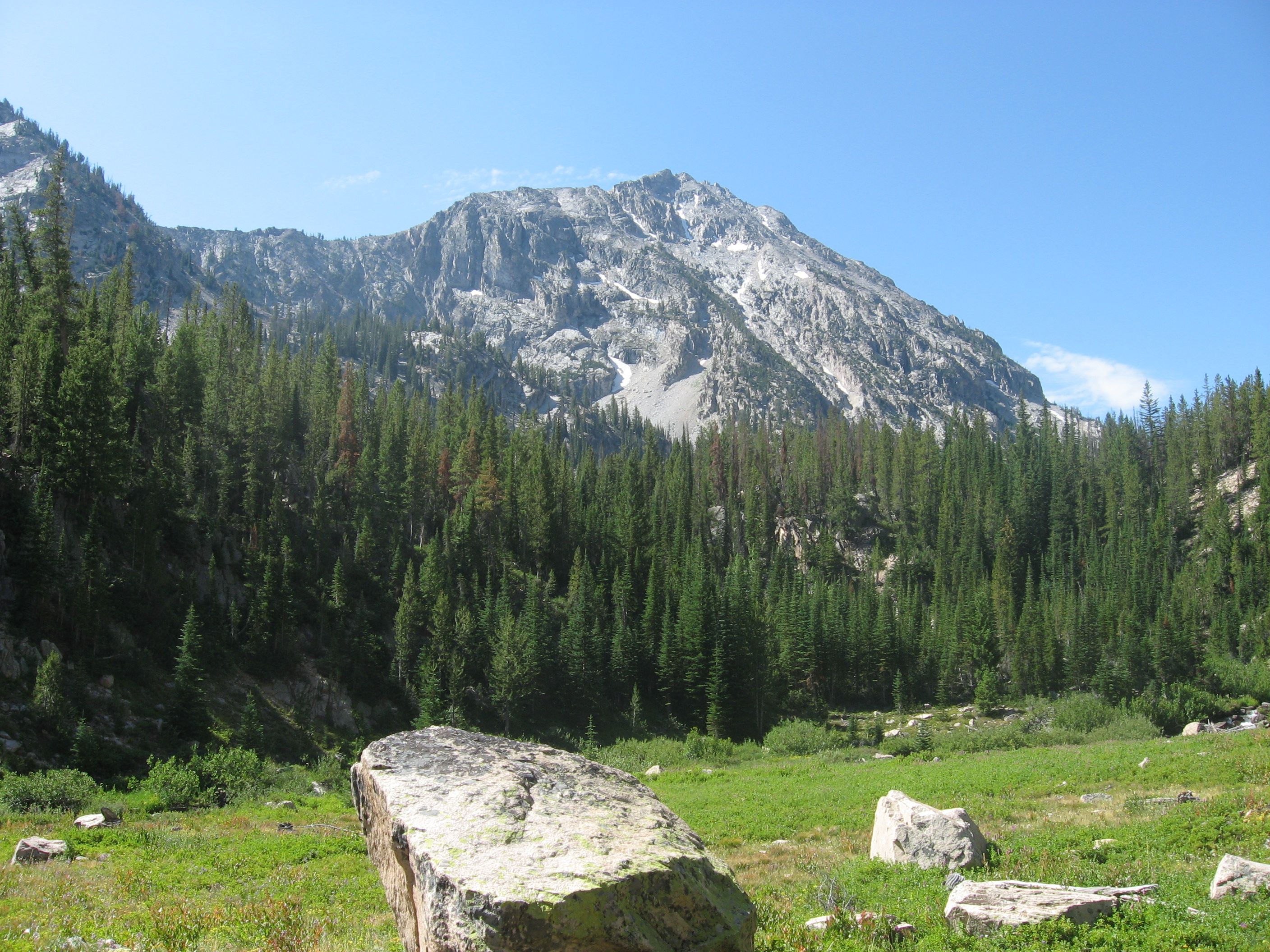
A meadow and spruce-fir forests below Parks Peak

Land cover types in the Sawtooth Wilderness include pine and spruce-fir forests, meadows, and alpine tundra. Lodgepole pine forms nearly monotypic forests in lower elevations of the wilderness, while douglas fir and quaking aspen can also be found. Higher elevations contain whitebark pine, Engelmann spruce, subalpine fir, and limber pine. There are no known threatened or endangered plant species in the wilderness.

=== Fauna ===
Most of the area's native mammal species are present in the wilderness, with the exception of grizzly bears, which have become locally extinct. Gray wolves were reintroduced to the SNRA amidst controversy in the mid-1990s and now occupy most of the forest except for the Minidoka District. They were reintroduced to restore the ecosystem stability that they provide as top predators, including managing high elk populations, which had inhibited new vegetation growth. Opponents to the reintroduction included hunters concerned that wolves would inhibit their ability to hunt the highest number of game species possible, ranchers concerned for the welfare of their animals, and land developers concerned that a species listed under the Endangered Species Act may restrict what they can do to their land. Plans for the reintroduction of grizzly bears to central Idaho have been proposed since the 1990s, but have not progressed because of concerns similar to those with the wolf reintroduction but also concerns for personal safety. The wilderness contains habitat for wolverines and the endangered Canada lynx, but no recent sightings of these species have been reported.

Other large mammals found in the wilderness include mule deer, elk, moose, mountain goats, mountain lions, and black bears. Bull trout are the management indicator species for Sawtooth National Forest, and they can be found in some of the streams in the wilderness. Population monitoring efforts are undertaken every year to provide an assessment of forest health. They were selected because they are dependent upon specific habitat conditions and sensitive to habitat changes.

== See also ==
- List of peaks of the Sawtooth Range (Idaho)
- List of mountains of Idaho
- List of mountain peaks of Idaho
- List of mountain ranges in Idaho
