= Sawtooth Range (Idaho) =

Mountain range in Idaho, United States

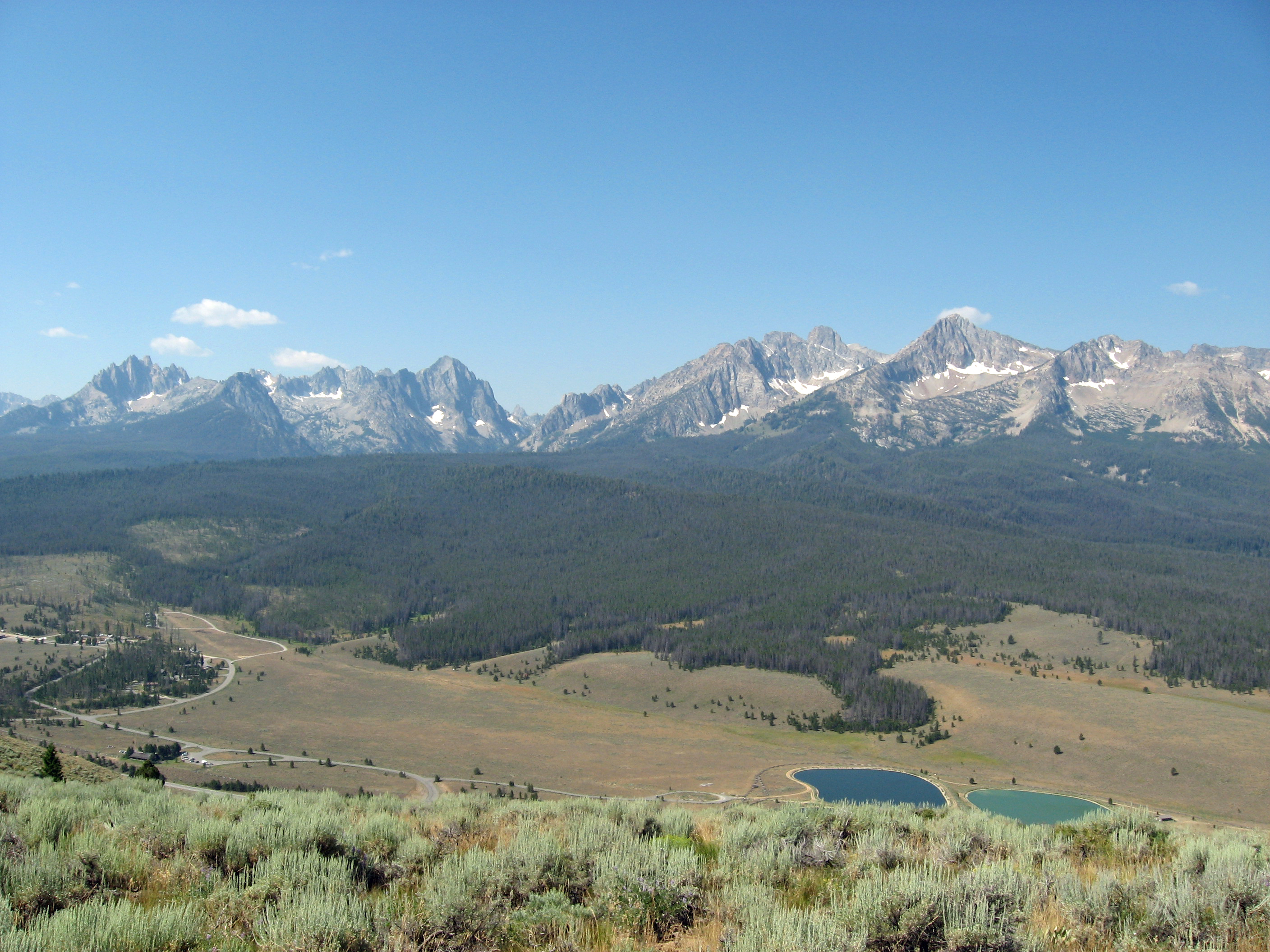

Highest point
- Peak: Thompson Peak
- Elevation: 10,756 ft (3,278 m) NAVD 88
- Coordinates: 44°08′30″N 115°00′36″W

Dimensions
- Length: 43 mi (69 km) N/S
- Width: 25 mi (40 km) E/W
- Area: 678 mi^{2} (1,760 km^{2})

Geography
- Location within Idaho
- Country: United States
- State: Idaho
- Counties: Custer, Boise, Blaine and Elmore
- Range coordinates: 43°57′12″N 114°59′26″W
- Parent range: Rocky Mountains
- Borders on: Sawtooth Valley

The Sawtooth Range is a mountain range of the Rocky Mountains in central Idaho, United States, reaching a maximum elevation of 10,751 feet (3,277 m) at the summit of Thompson Peak. It encompasses an area of 678 square miles (1,756 km^{2}) spanning parts of Custer, Boise, Blaine, and Elmore counties, and is bordered to the east by the Sawtooth Valley. Much of the mountain range is within the Sawtooth Wilderness, part of the Sawtooth National Recreation Area and Sawtooth National Forest.

The mountains were named for their jagged peaks.

== Peaks ==
There are 57 peaks with an elevation over 10,000 feet (3,000 m) in the Sawtooth Range, all falling between 10,000 to 10,751 feet (3,048 to 3,277 m) on Thompson Peak, the highest point in the range. Another 77 peaks fall between 9,000 and 10,000 feet (2,700 and 3,000 m).

Climbs range in difficulty between the 9,150-foot (2,790 m) Observation Peak, a Class 1 hike, and 8,980-foot (2,740 m) King Spire, a rock route rated Class 5.10 on the Yosemite Decimal System.

== Geology ==
The northern Sawtooth Range formed from the Eocene Sawtooth batholith, while south of Alturas Lake the mountains formed from the Cretaceous granodiorite of the Idaho Batholith. The Sawtooth Range has a history of alpine glaciation, but while no surface glaciers exist today, perennial snow fields and rock glaciers remain, usually on north or east facing slopes. There have been 202 perennial snow fields mapped in the Sawtooth Range. The Sawtooth Range was last extensively glaciated in the Pleistocene, but glaciers probably existed during the Little Ice Age, which ended around 1850 AD. Evidence of past glaciation given remnants of the glaciers such as glacial lakes, moraines, horns, hanging valleys, cirques, and arêtes.

=== Seismology ===
In 2010, scientists from Idaho State University discovered the Sawtooth Fault near the base of the mountains, running for 40 mi (64 km), near Stanley and Redfish Lake. The Sawtooth Fault’s latest period of significant seismic activity occurred between roughly 4,000 and 7,000 years ago. Nevertheless, estimates predict that it could be capable of producing a 7.5-magnitude earthquake, felt as far away as Boise, a distance of some 132.7 miles (213.5 km).

== Waterways ==
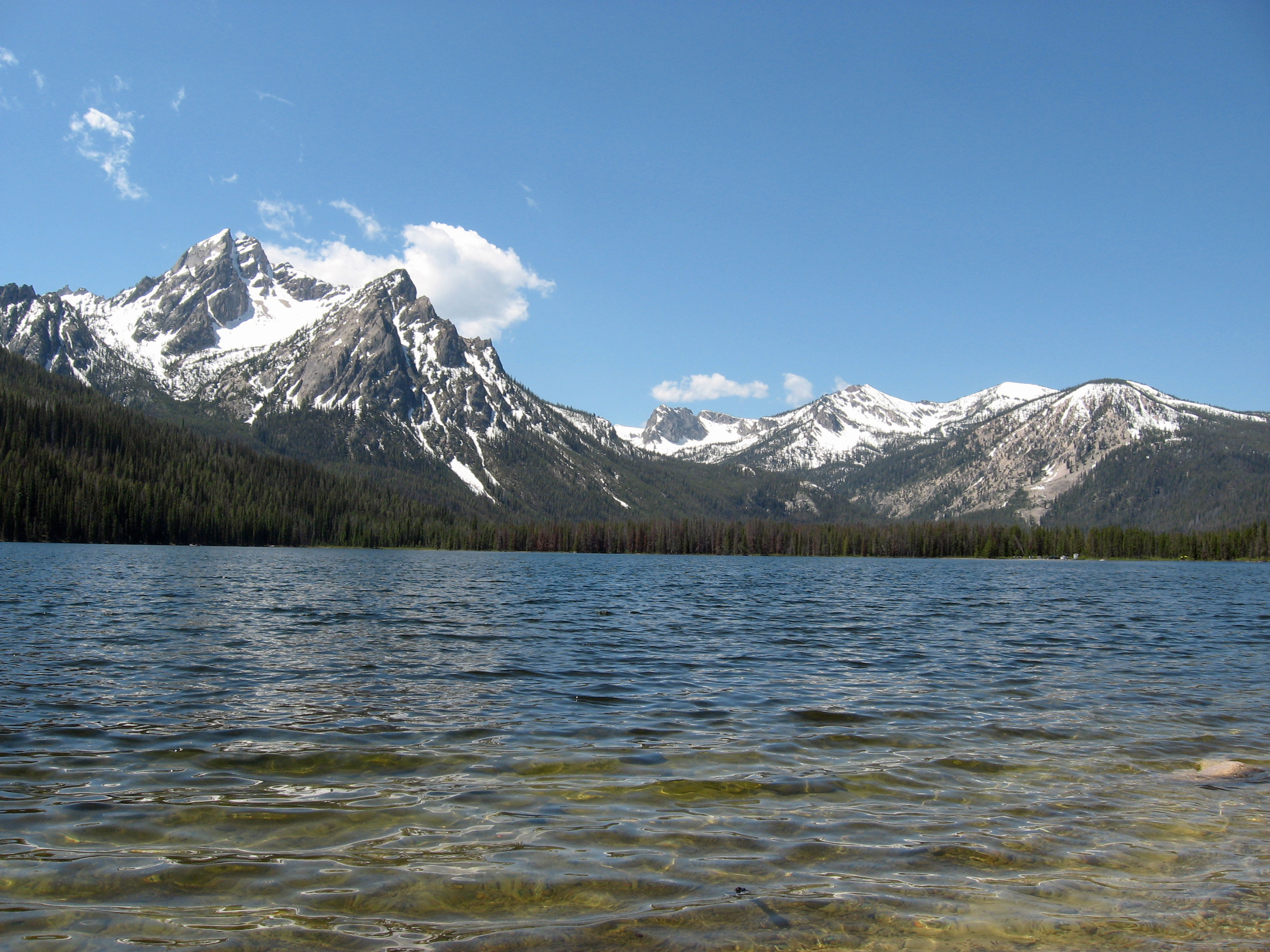
McGown Peak and Stanley Lake

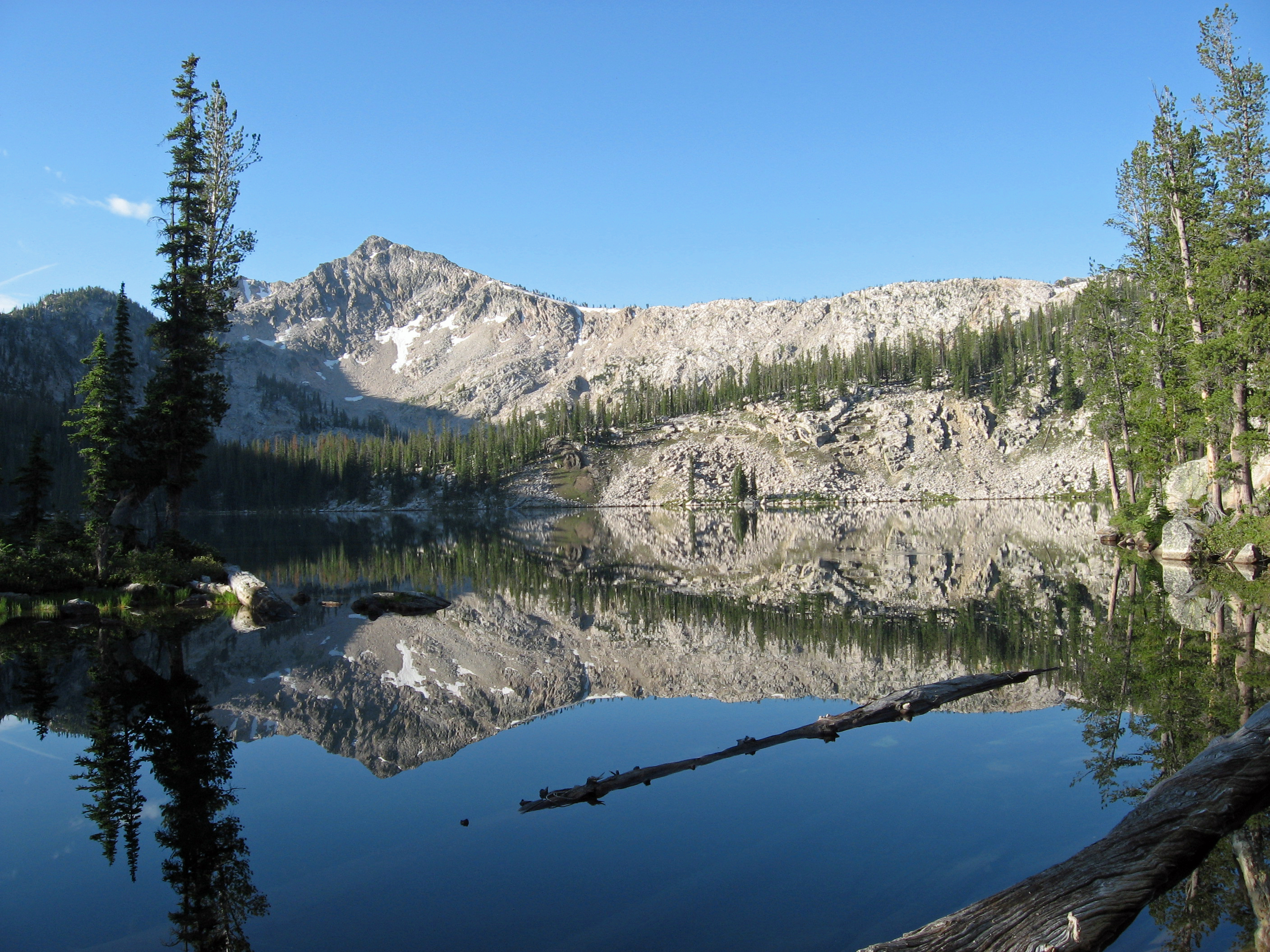
Edna Lake

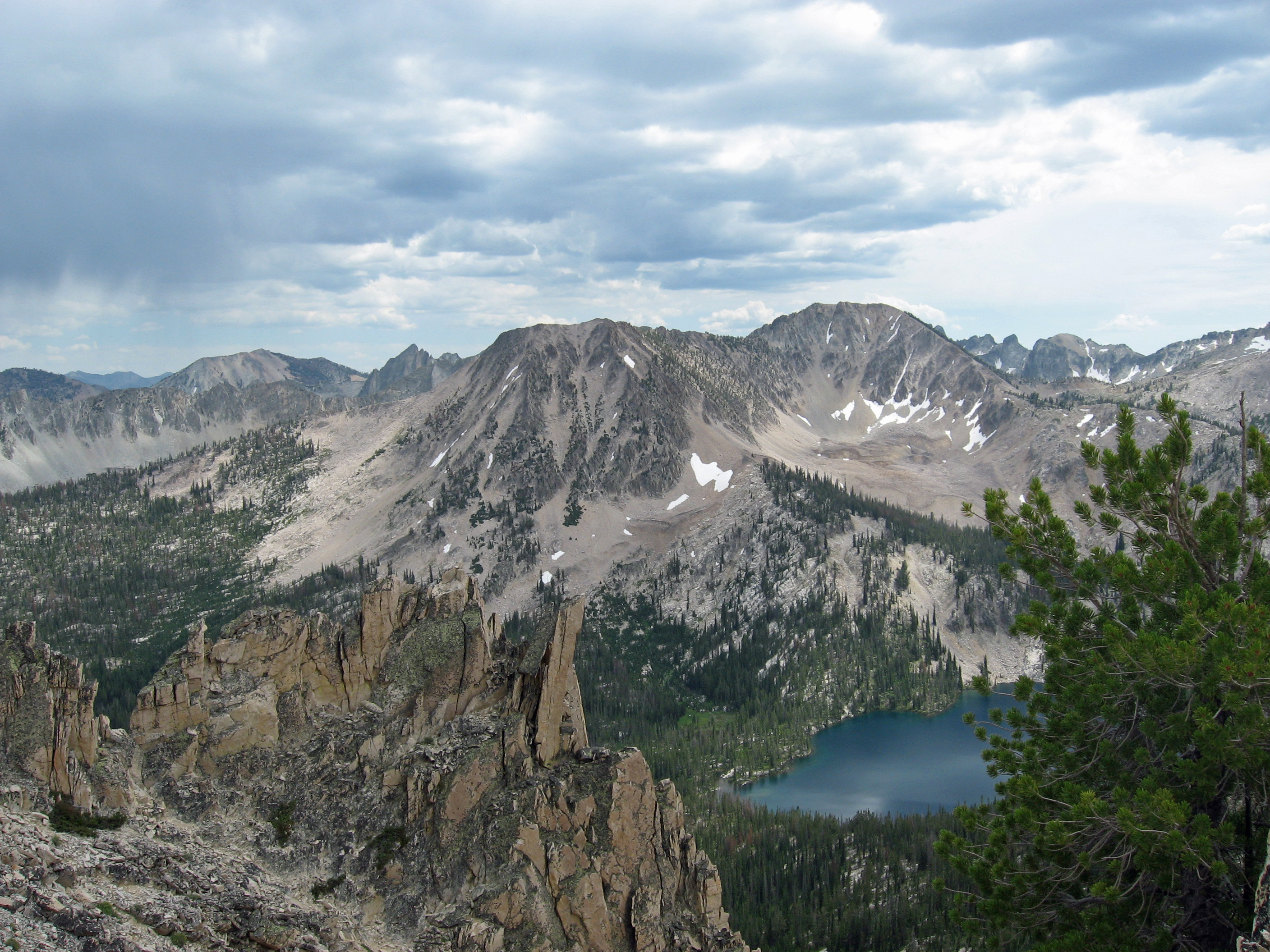
Sawtooth Mountains and Toxaway Lake

The Sawtooth Range is home to hundreds of lakes created by vanished alpine glaciers, with nearly 400 lakes in the Sawtooth Wilderness. Five of the six largest lakes in the range are located outside the wilderness (Redfish, Alturas, Pettit, Yellow Belly, and Stanley lakes), while Sawtooth Lake is within the wilderness.

Most of the east side of the Sawtooth Range is drained by the main stem of the Salmon River and the west side by the South Fork Payette River. Small portions of the northern and southern ends of the range are in the watersheds of the Middle Fork Salmon River and Boise River, respectively.

== Recreation ==
There are 40 trails totaling nearly 350 miles (560 km) in the Sawtooth Wilderness that can be used for day hiking, backpacking, and horseback riding and accessed from 23 trailheads. Additional trails traverse the foothills of the mountains outside the designated wilderness. Camping is permitted anywhere in the wilderness. There are several developed campgrounds on the western side of range, outside the Sawtooth Wilderness, including at Redfish, Little Redfish, Alturas, Pettit, and Stanley lakes, as well as at Iron Creek. Restrictions on fires and animals apply in some areas.

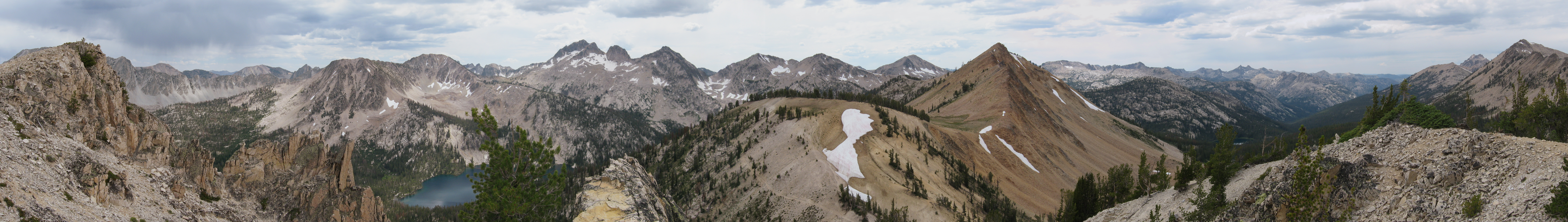
Sawtooth Mountain Panorama.
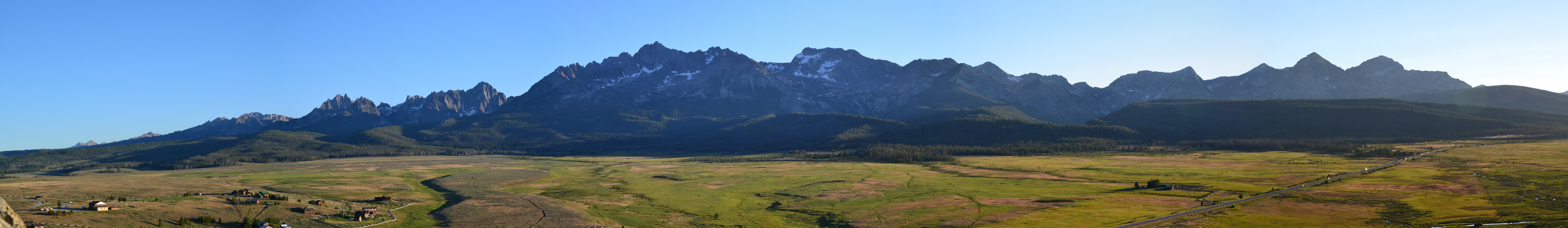
Sawtooth Range as photographed in Stanley

== See also ==
- Sawtooth National Recreation Area
- Lakes of the Sawtooth Mountains (Idaho)
- Sawtooth National Forest
- List of mountain ranges in Idaho
- List of mountains of Idaho
- List of mountain peaks of Idaho
