= Grandjean =

Grandjean is a French surname. Notable people with the surname include:

- Edmond Grandjean (1844–1908), French artist
- Étienne Grandjean (1914–1991), Swiss physician
- Évelyne Grandjean (born 1939), French actress
- Jean Grandjean (1752–1781), Dutch artist
- Louise Grandjean (1870–1934), French soprano
- Michel Grandjean (1931–2010), Swiss pair skater
- Philippe Grandjean (1666–1714), French type engraver
- Philippe Grandjean (professor), Danish-American health researcher
- René Grandjean (1884–1963), early Swiss pilot and aircraft designer
- René Grandjean (footballer) (c. 1882–?), French football player
- Silvia Grandjean (born 1934), Swiss pair skater

== See also ==
- Grandjean, Charente-Maritime, commune in the Charente-Maritime department, France
- Grandjean Fjord, NE Greenland
- Grandjean House, Denmark
- Grandjean Peak, Idaho, US
