= 1857 in Denmark =

- Decades: 1830s; 1840s; 1850s; 1860s; 1870s
- See also: Other events of 1857; List of years in Denmark

Events from the year 1857 in Denmark.

== Incumbents ==
- Monarch – Frederick VII
- Prime minister – Carl Christoffer Georg Andræ (until 13 May), Carl Christian Hall

== Events ==
- March – The first annual Charlottenborg Spring Exhibition opens.
- 30 June – Hassel & Teudt is founded in Copenhagen.
- 17 September – The Folketeatret opens in Copenhagen.

=== Undated ===
- Svanemøllen is constructed on the island of Bornholm.
- A new main building at Vibygård is constructed.
- Axel E. Aamodts Lithografiske Etablissement is founded.
- Christiani & Grisson is acquired by Wilhelm Hansen.

== Births ==
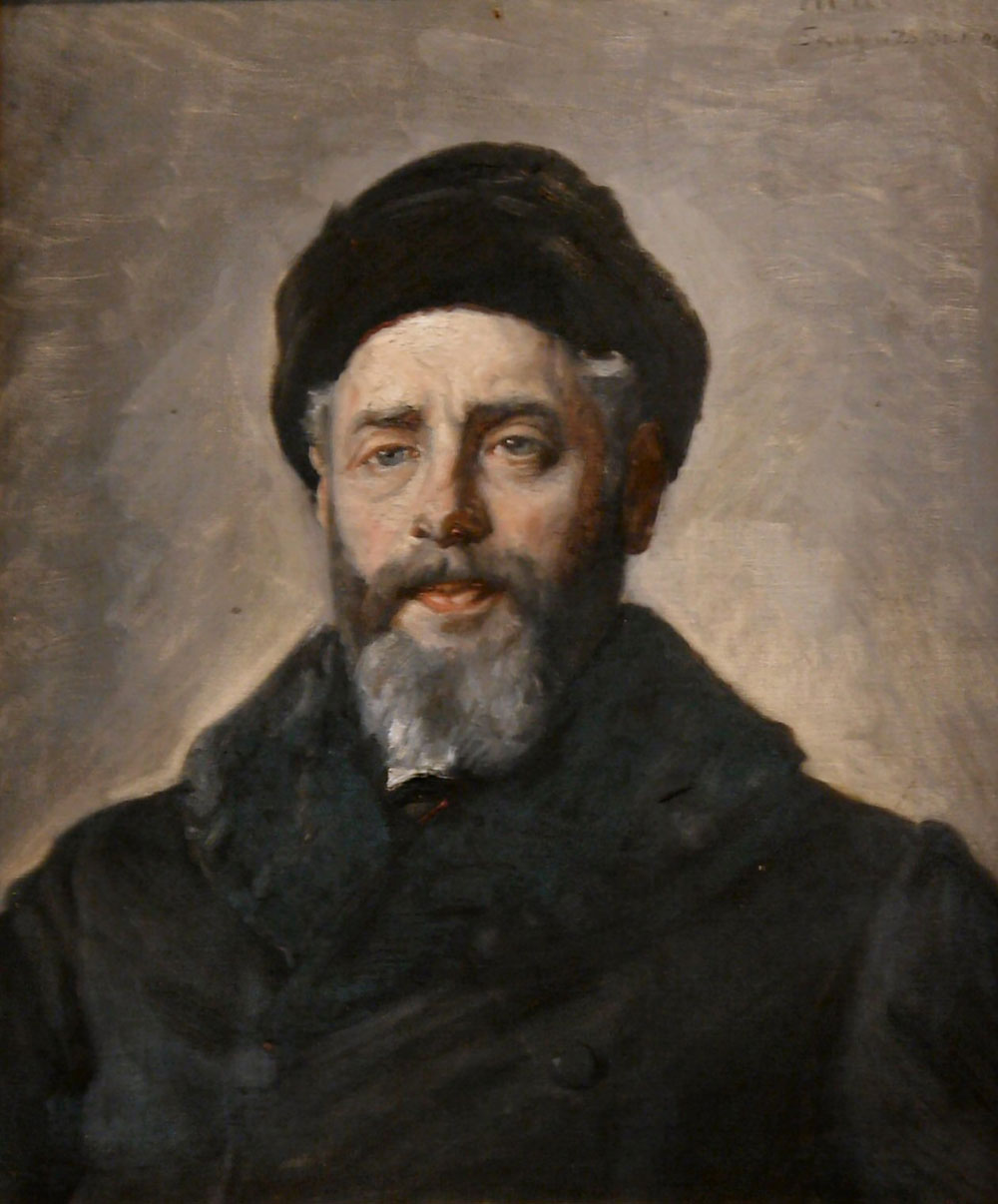
Henrik Pontoppidan.

=== January–March ===
- 3 February – Wilhelm Johannsen, pharmacist and botanist (died 1927)

=== April–June ===
- 7 April – H. A. Brendekilde, sculptor (died 1942)

=== July–September ===
- 24 July – Henrik Pontoppidan, Nobel Prize-winning writer (died 1943)
- 31 August – Niels Jacobsen, business executive

=== October–December ===
- 7 December – Hans-Georg Tersling, architect (died 1920)
- 9 December – Alba Schwartz, writer and novelist (died 1942)

== Deaths ==
- 23 June – Christian Molbech, historian and editor (born 1783)
- 6 February – Holger Christian Reedtz, government official, diplomat and landowner (born 1800)
- 16 September – Johannes Dam Hage, editor (born 1800)
- 23 November – Ida Brunm socialite (born 1792)
