= Grandjean family (Denmark) =

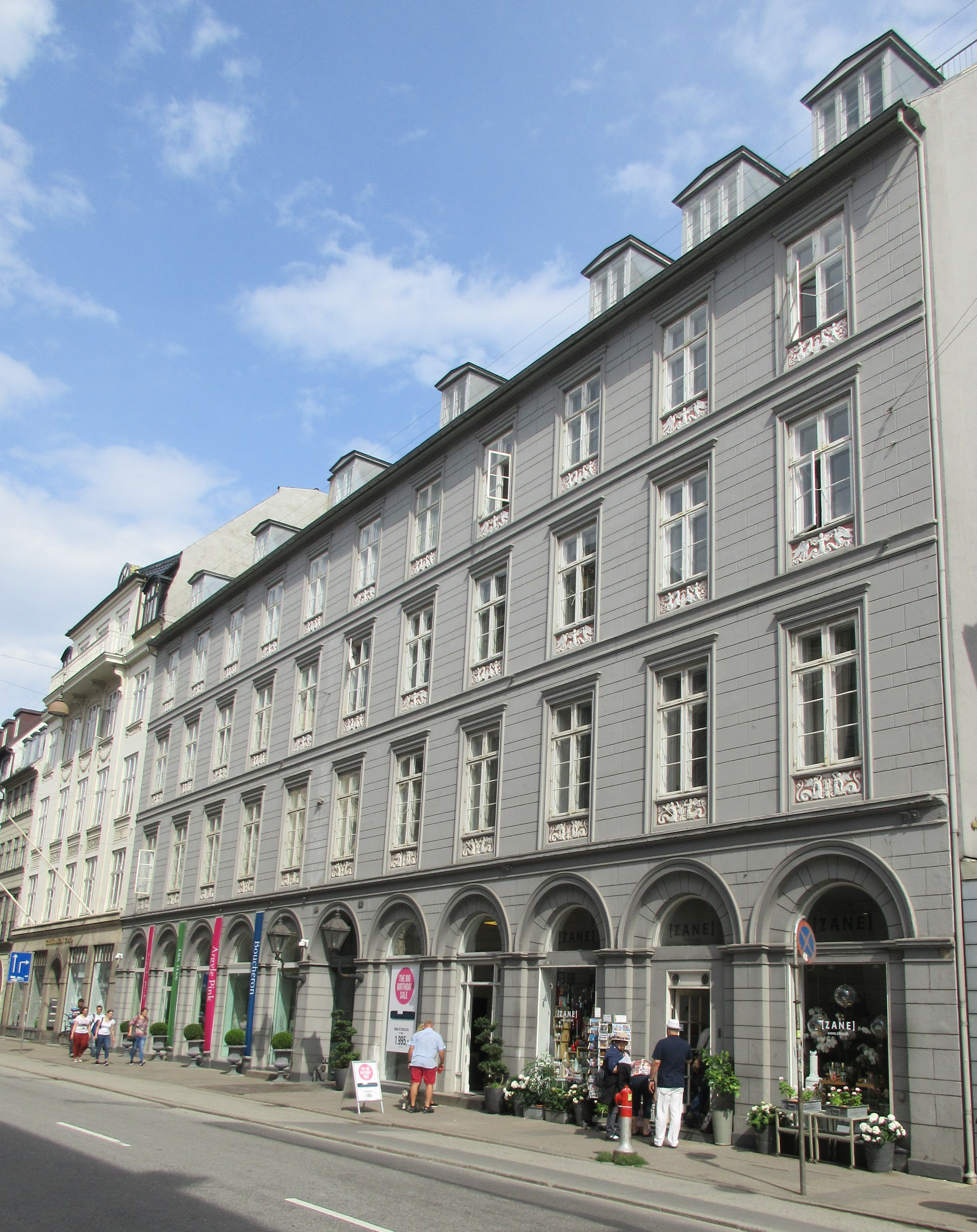
The Grandjean House in Copenhagen

The Grandjean family is a Danish family of French ancestry with several notable members. The manor house Vennerslund on the island of Falster has been owned by members of the family since 1809. The family is also associated with the historic Grandjean House on Bredgade in Copenhagen.

== Origins ==
It is believed that the Grandjean name originates in the environs of Luon. Augustinus Grandjean (c. 1640–1714) emigrated to Denmark during the reign of Christian V and was in 1685 registered as quartermaster at kvartermester ved oberst Rabe's cavalry regiment.

== Notable family members ==
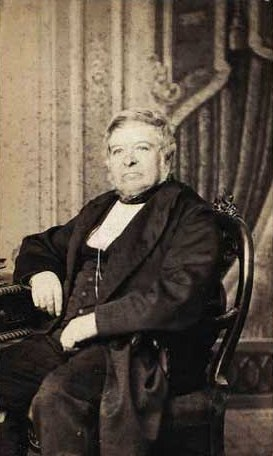
Christian Frederik Bredo Grandjean photographed by Budtz Müller

- Christian Frederik Bredo Grandjean (1811–1877), pastrymaker and builder of the Grandjean House
- Harald Frederik Grandjean (1841–1925), military officer and historian
- Axel Grandjean (1847–1932), composer and conductor
- Emile Grandjean (1861–1942), forester
- Poul Bredo Grandjean (1880–1957), heraldryst and Danish National Archives archivist
- Vincens Grandjean (1898–1970), landowner, military officer, chamberlain, hofjægermester and Olympic rider
- Tove Elisabeth Grandjean née Madsen (1908–1997), actress
- Bredo L. Grandjean (1916–1986), art historian
- Austin Grandjean (1930–2006), graphic designer
- Susanne Brockenhuus-Schack née Grandjean (born 1938), countess and landowner
- Philippe Grandjean (born 1950), scientist
- Nikolaj Grandjean (born 1973), singer, songwriter and music producer
