= Copenhagen Amber Museum =

Amber museum in Denmark

Coordinates: 55°40′51.3″N 12°35′15.3″E

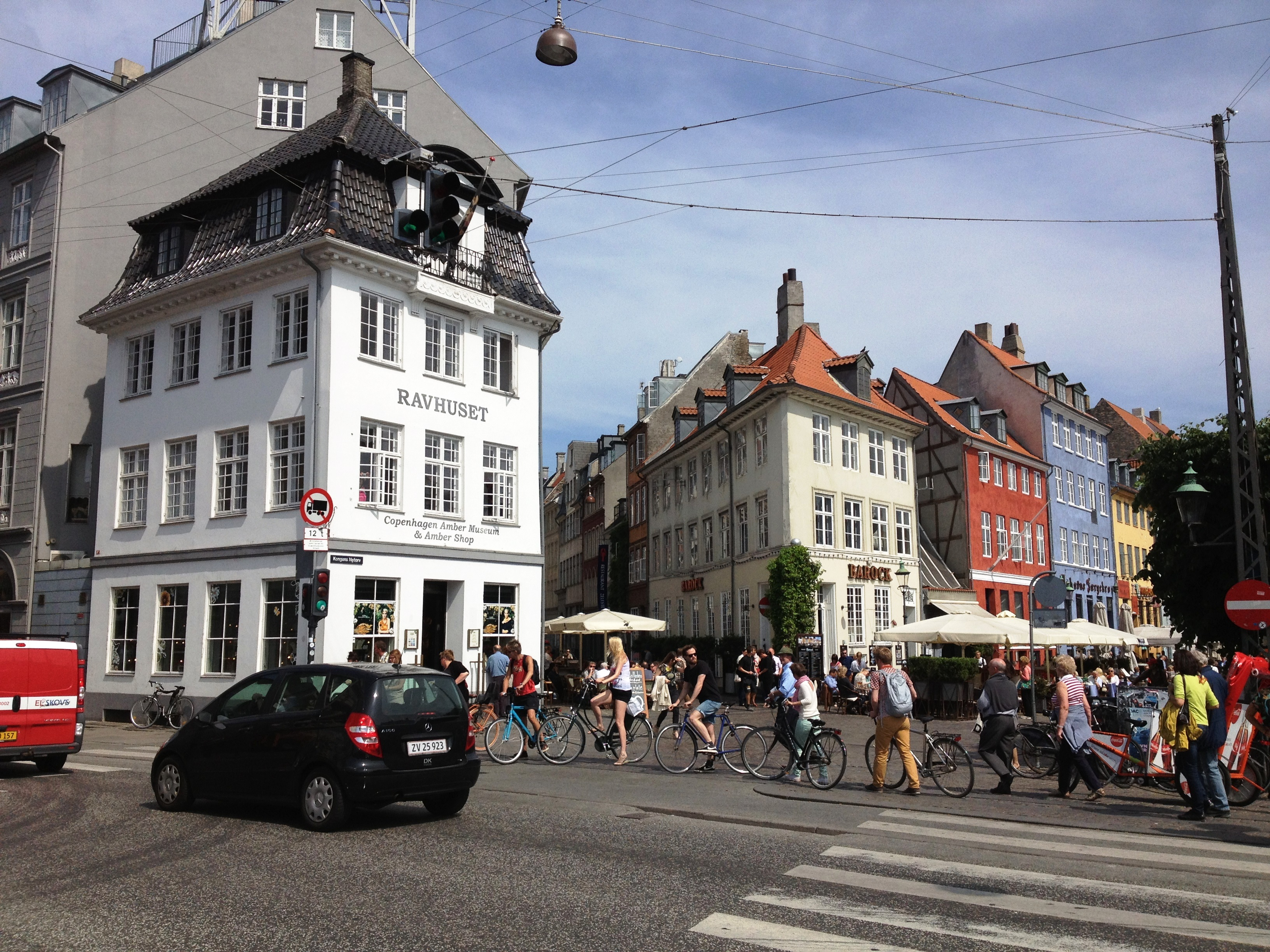
Copenhagen Amber Museum, seen from Kongens Nytorv

The Copenhagen Amber Museum (Danish: Københavns Ravmuseum) is a museum on Kongens Nytorv in central Copenhagen, Denmark. The museum is owned by House of Amber. The museum holds an extensive collection of amber antiques and artifacts, including a wide array of entombed insects from prehistoric times. The collection comprises one of the largest piece of amber in the world.

== Kanneworff House ==
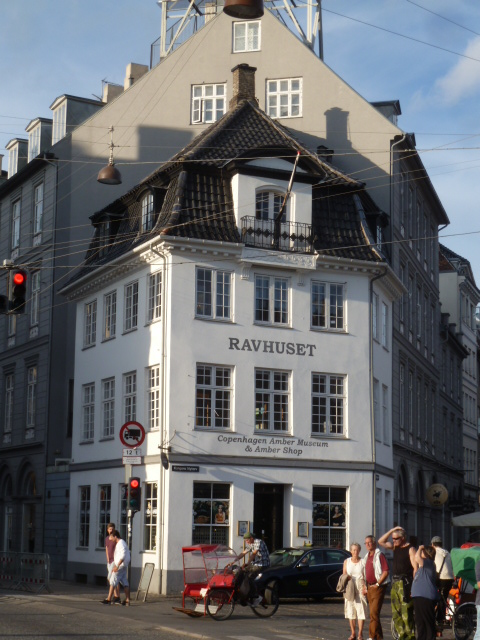
Kanneworff Hus

The museum is located in Kanneworff House (Kanneworffs Hus) one of Copenhagen’s oldest houses. It is placed at the square Kongens Nytorv right at the entrance of Nyhavn. Kanneworffs House was built in 1606, even before Kongens Nytorv was founded and the channel of Nyhavn was dug. Its current appearance is largely due to an adaptation in the 1780s which added an extra floor and the Mansard roof. The three-story building consists of three bays on Bredgade, four bays on Kongens Nytorv and two bays on Store Strandstræde. Another adaptation in 1904 moved the entrance to Bredgade. Through the years the house has been inhabited by all kinds of people from barbers, tobacco spinners, carpenters, grocers and even the lackey of a noble count. In 1836 wool and cloth grocer Lars Kanneworff bought the house and during the next century it housed one of Copenhagen’s tailor establishments.

== Museum collection ==
One of the main attractions of the museum is the collection of more than 100 pieces of amber with inclusions of insects and plants. Magnifying glasses enable the visitor to observe the more than 30 million year-old insects and plants closely. Copenhagen Amber Museum also presents its visitors to the world's largest piece of amber, which weighs 47.5 kg.

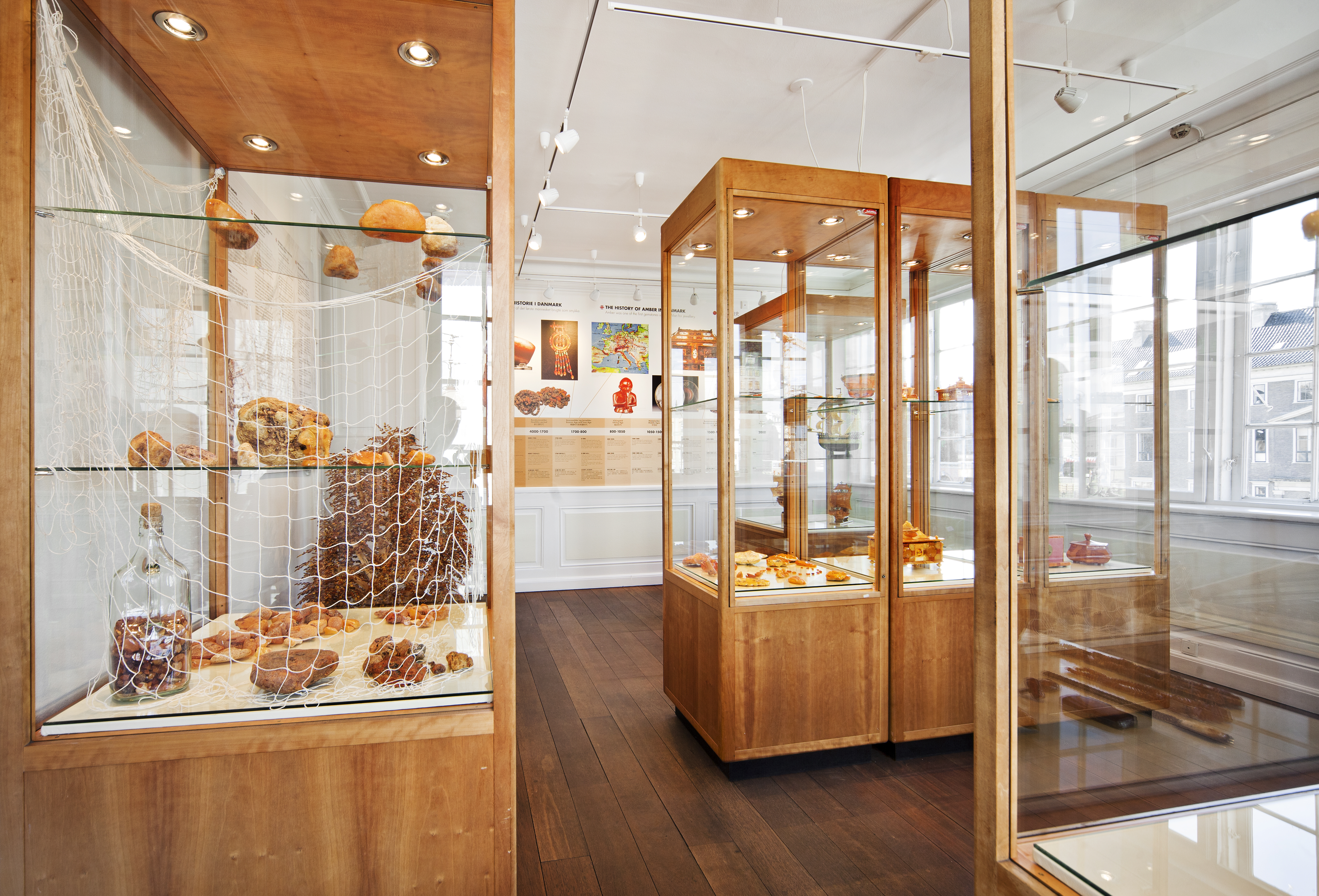
Copenhagen Amber Museum interior

Denmark’s biggest amber find in modern times can be found in the Copenhagen Amber Museum. In June 2010, a Danish fisherman caught one of Denmark’s largest pieces of amber ever found. He caught the piece in his net on a fishing trip far out to sea. He found it hard to believe his own eyes when he pulled in his net that June morning, for in the net lay the biggest piece of amber he had ever found. The amber rock weighed 4,125 gr., and was the largest piece of amber found in Denmark since 1767.
