= Collin House =

Listed Neoclassical property in central Copenhagen, Denmark

Coordinates: 55.6780°N 12.5805°E

- Den Collinske Gård
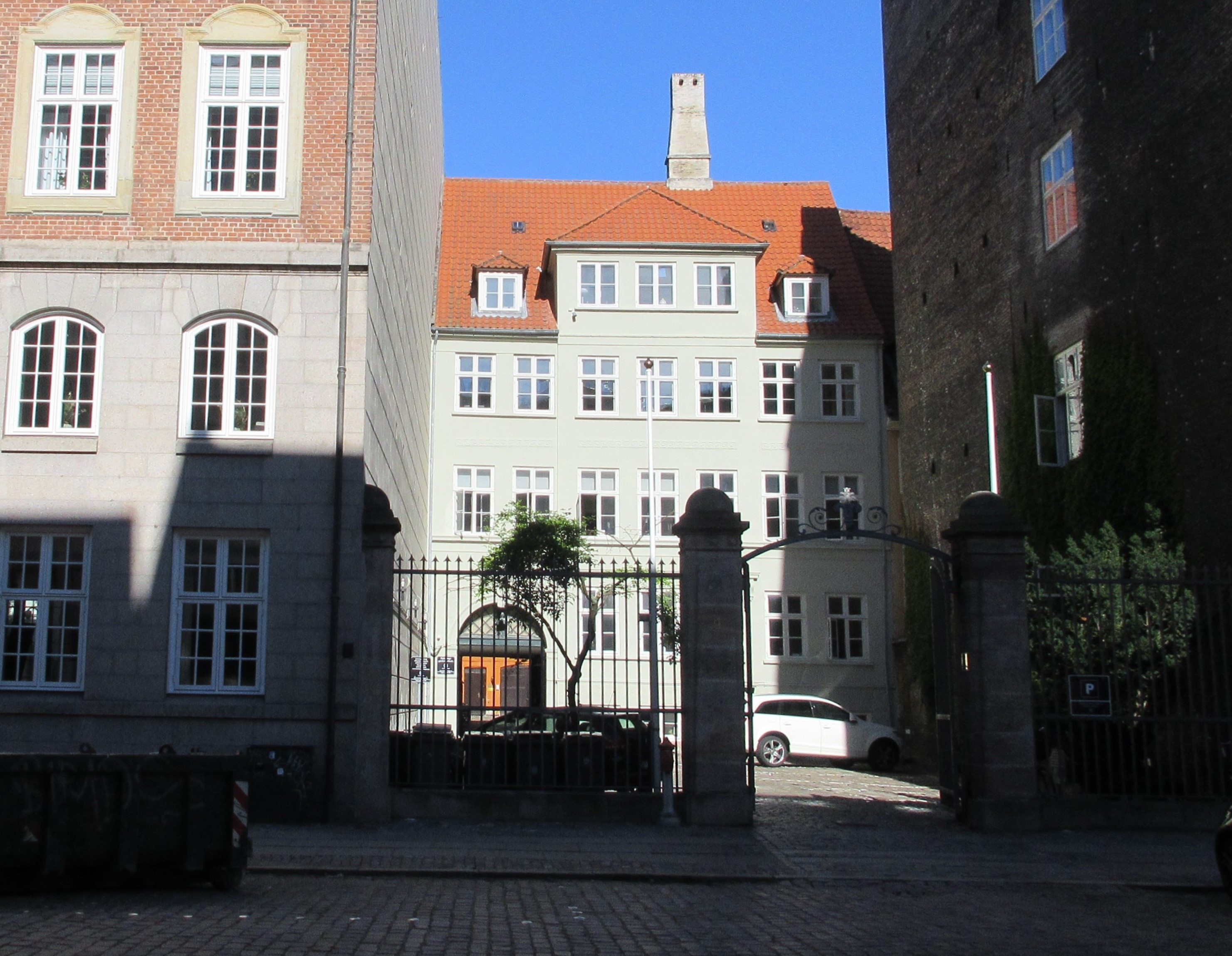
- The house viewed from Amaliegade

General information
- Architectural style: Neoclassical
- Location: Copenhagen, Denmark, Denmark
- Construction started: 1751
- Completed: 1752

The Collin House (Danish: Den Collinske Gård) is a listed Neoclassical property at Amaliegade No. 9 in the Frederiksstaden district of central Copenhagen, Denmark. It takes its name after Jonas Collin, a prominent civil servant and leading patrons of the arts during the Danish Golden Age, who owned the building from 1838 to 1861. He was a close friend and loyal supporter of Hans Christian Andersen who often visited the house.

== History ==
=== Early history ===
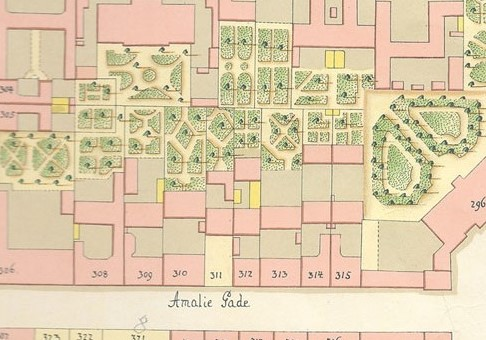
No. 422 seen on a detail from Christian Gedde's map of St. Ann's Rast Quarter, 1757.

The house was built for chair maker Peder Svendsen in 1752. In the new cadastre of 1756, it was listed as No. 71 V. It was owned at that time by a brewer named Lauritz Jørgensen. On Christian Gedde's map of St. Ann's East Quarter from 1757, it was marked as No. 311.

In the new cadastre of 1806, the property was listed as No. 155 in St. Ann's East Quarter. It had been acquired by the physician and surgeon Heinrich Callisen by that time. He has been described as the "father of surgery" in Denmark.

The property had been acquired by 1787 by the surgeon Henrich Callesen in the Royal Danish Navy. He lived there with his wife Maria Amalia née Walker, their four children (aged four to nine), a daughter from his first marriage (aged 14), his first wife's sister Juliane Marie Braun, two maids, a female cook, a coachman and two lodgers.

=== Collin family ===
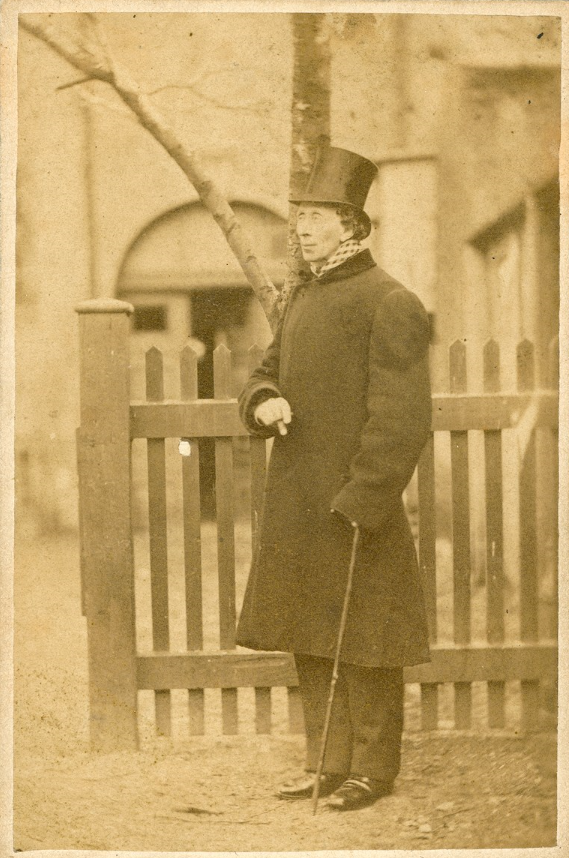
Hans Christian Andersen smoking a cigar in the garden behind the house, photographed by Theodor Collin in 1972

In 1838, it was acquired by Jonas Collin. He had resided until then in an old and somewhat ramshackle house on Store Strandstræde. Allegedly, Jonas Collin decided to move when it rained through the ceiling and onto the table in the presence of Bertel Thorvaldsen. On 3 October, Collin arranged a housewarming which was attended by some of the leading Danish artists of the time, including Bertel Thorvaldsen and Hermann Ernst Freund, Johan Ludvig, Hans Christian Andersen and Johanne Luise Heiberg. Jonas Collin and his wife lived on the two lower floors. Their son Theodor Collin was also part of the household at the time of the 1845 census. Their daughter Ingeborg and her husband Adolph Drewsen resided on the second floor.

The building was later home to the company M.J. Grønbech & Sønner whose old headquarters at Bag Børsen 76 was demolished in connection with an expansion of Slotsholmen. The company relocated to Kristianiagade 9 in 1947.

== Architecture ==
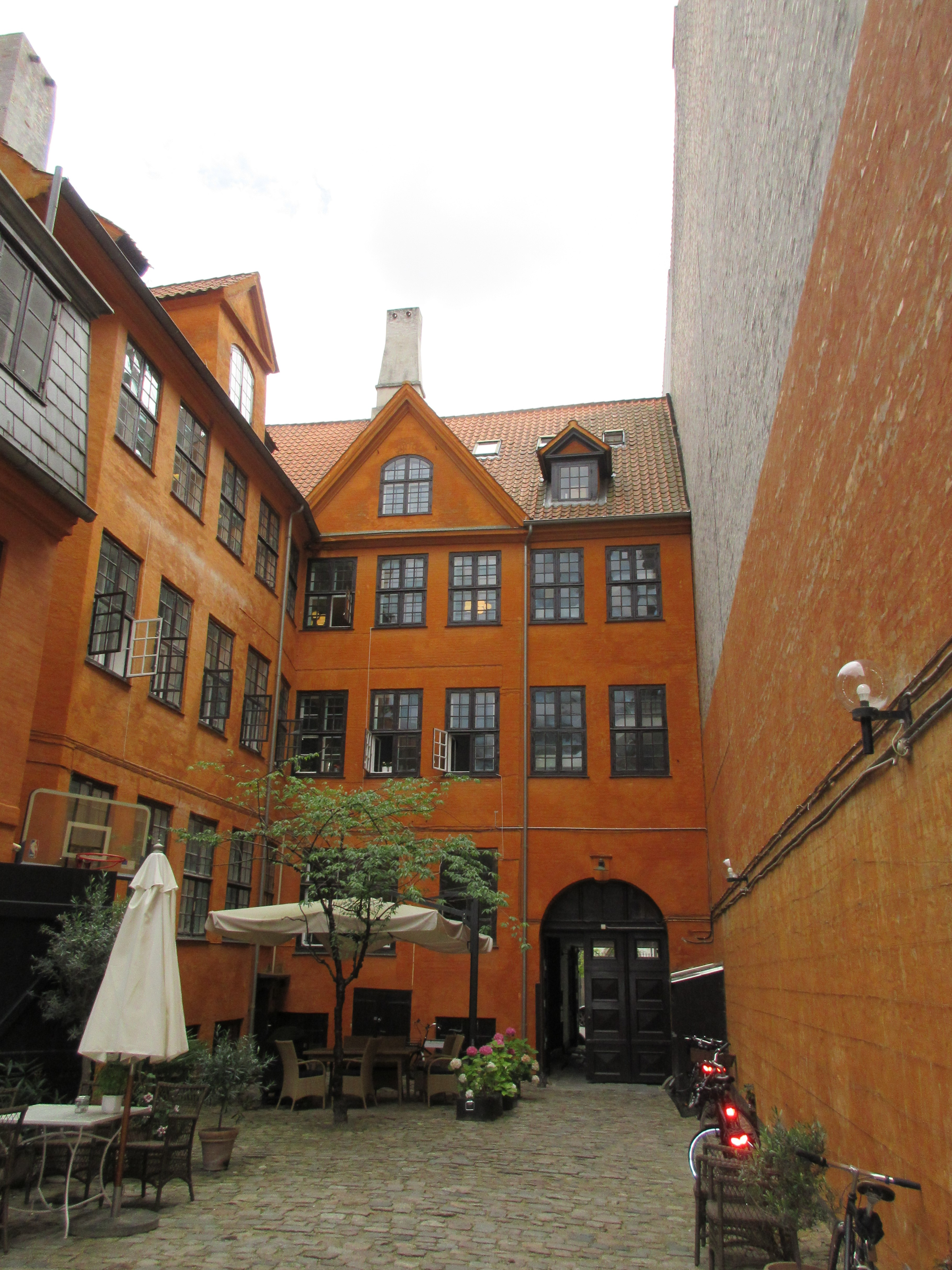
Rear side of the building

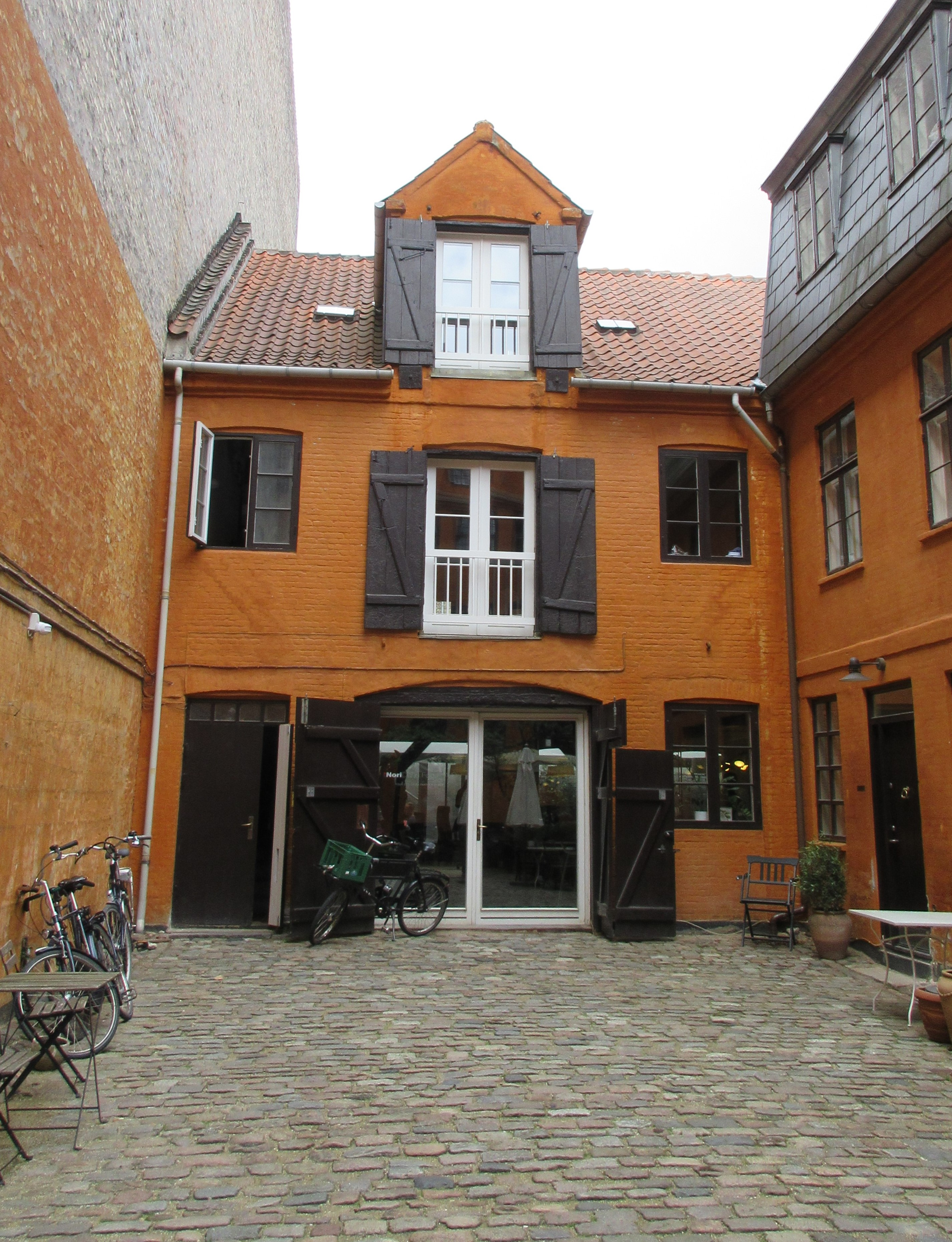
The building to the rear of the main building

The house consists of three floors and is seven bays wide. It is pulled back from the street and thus breaks fundamentally with Nicolai Eigtved's strict guidelines for the architecture of Amaliegade and Frederiksstaden. The authorities long hoped to see a new building at the site that filled out the hole in the row of houses and therefore rejected an application from the owner to build a fence on the street in 1768. The fence seen today was built in connection with a renovation of the house where the three-bay wall dormer seen today replaced a triangular pediment dating from when the house was built.

An arched gateway opens to a narrow, cobbled yard. A small building at the far end of the courtyard is also listed.

== Today ==
The building fronting the street contains an apartment on each floor. NoriDane Foods, a Nortura-owned meat trading company, is based in the rear wing (No. 9B).

== See also ==
- Grandjean House
- Jan von Osten House
