= Emile Grandjean =

American forester (1861–1942)

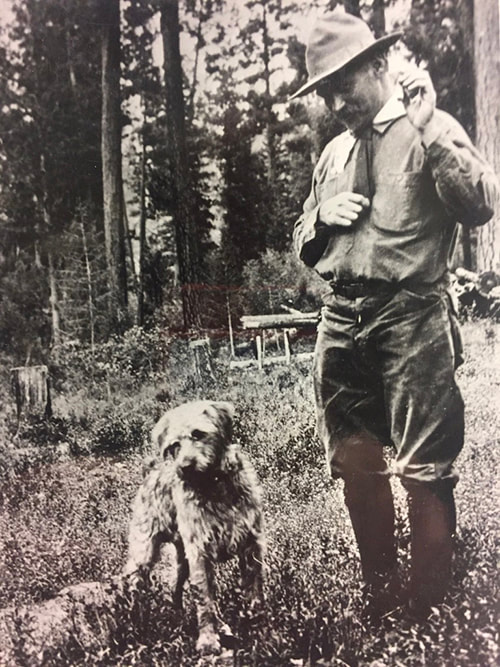
Grandjean and his dog in the Boise National Forest

Emile A. Grandjean (October 31, 1861 – August 8, 1942) was an American forester who was the first supervisor of Boise National Forest, serving from 1908 to 1922.

== Early life ==
Grandjean was born on October 31, 1861, in Copenhagen, Denmark.He was born into a family of relative influence, with his father being named a King's Counsellor. Both his father and grandfather worked in the Danish royal forests and Grandjean received training as a forester. In 1883 Grandjean immigrated to the United States and moved to Idaho to become a trapper.

== Career ==
Grandjean joined the United States Forest Service in 1905 and after two years serving in various forests around Idaho, he was appointed as supervisor of Sawtooth National Forest West. In 1908 that area was re-designated as Boise National Forest and Grandjean became its first supervisor, a role he served in for 14 years. Shortly after becoming supervisor, Grandjean negotiated with sheep farmers who were upset about the permitting process to expand operations into the forest. Those negotiations were heated, with Grandjean commenting that "I was, in fact, threatened with bodily harm." He believed that the role of forest supervisors was firstly to protect the health of the land rather than support free-range animals and voiced as much in regional forest service meetings. In 1912 Grandjean was given a sequoia seedling by John Muir which was planted in Boise and grew into the state's largest sequoia tree. In 1922 Grandjean was injured on the job. He was offered a position as supervisor of the Nevada National Forest but instead chose to retire, moving to Caldwell, Idaho.

== Personal life and legacy ==
Grandjean married in 1914 and had two children. He was related to Harlan J. Bushfield, the 16th Governor of South Dakota. Grandjean died on August 8, 1942.

A small memorial to Grandjean exists on Idaho State Highway 21 at mile marker 435. A crag in the Sawtooth National Forest is named Grandjean Peak in his honor, as is an unincorporated community close by.
