= Store Strandstræde 7 =

Building in central Copenhagen, Denmark

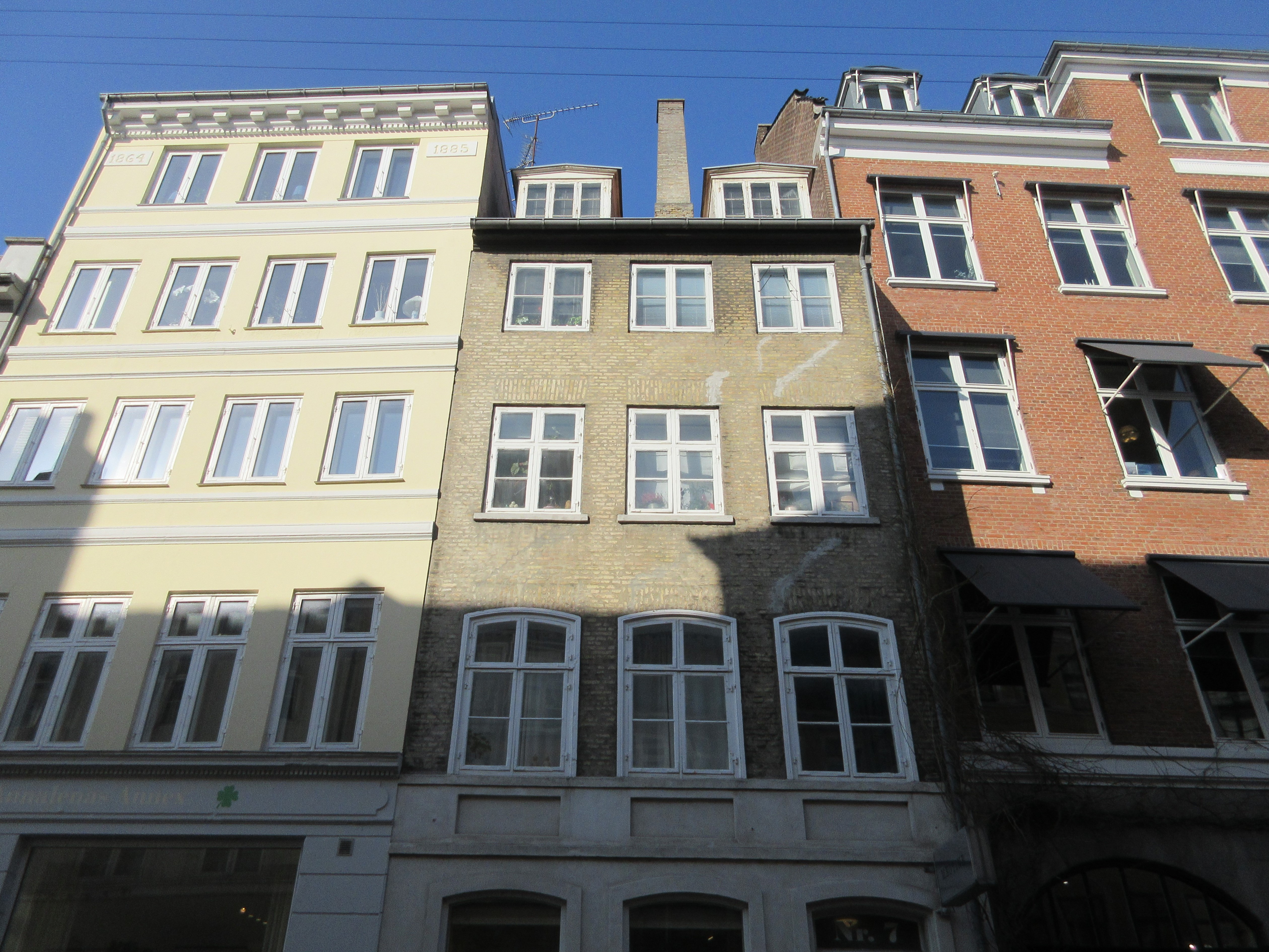
- Interactive map of the Store Strandstræde 7 area

General information
- Location: Copenhagen, Denmark
- Coordinates: 55°40′51.76″N 12°35′17.29″E
- Completed: 1781

Store Strandstræde 7 is a small building located close to Kongens Nytorv central Copenhagen, Denmark. The building was listed on the Danish registry of protected buildings and places in 1989.

== History ==
=== 18th century ===
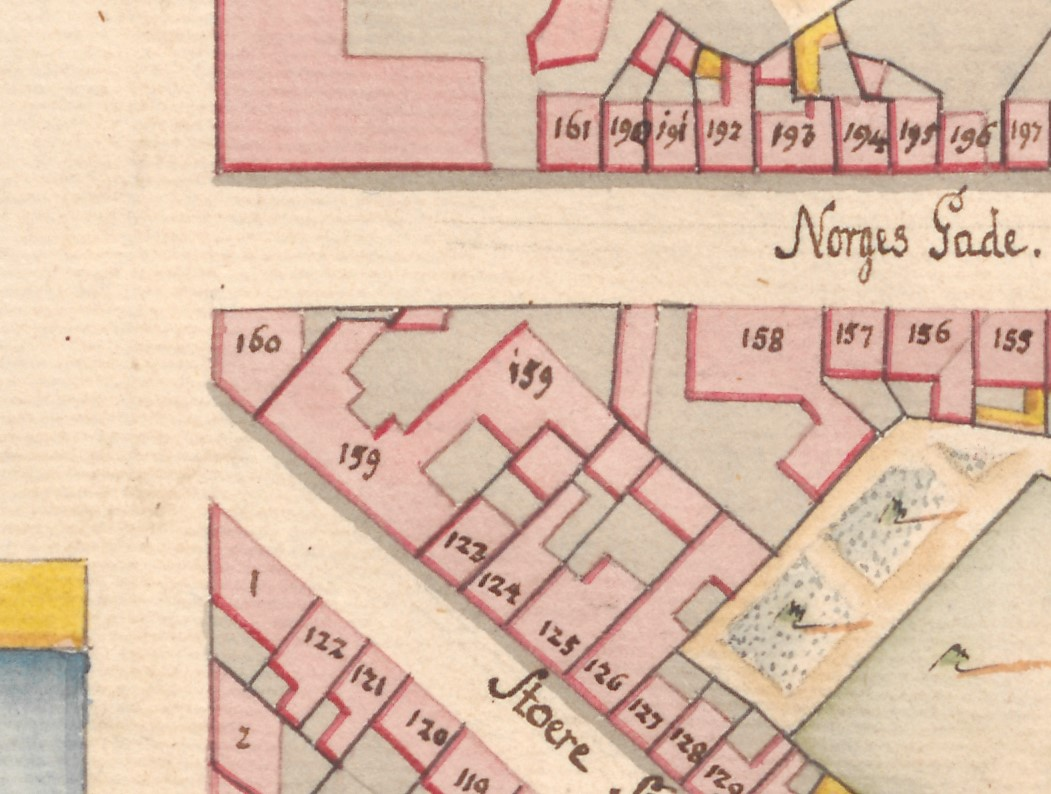
No. 124 seen in a detail from Christian Gedde's map of St. Ann's East Quarter, 1757

The property was listed in Copenhagen's first cadastre of 1689 as No. 40 in St. Ann's East Quarter (Sankt Annæ Øster Kvarter). It was at that time owned by tanner Henrik Stiemand. The property was listed as No. 124 in the new cadastre of 1756 and was then owned by painter Georg Krygger.

The present building on the site was constructed in 1781 for turner Søren Nielsen Nygaard.

Søren Nyegaard's property was home to 17 residents in three households at the time of the 1787 census. Nygaard resided in the building with his third wife Charlotte Lind, their one-year-old daughter, two daughters from his second marriage (aged 10 and 11), an apprentice and a maid. Ferdinand Ant. Heegaard, a retired customs officer, resided in the building with his wife Johanne Plato, an 11-year-old girl in their care and one maid. Christian Holm Flor (1736-1808), a regiment quartermaster, resided in the building with his wife Anna Cathrine Hesselberg (1761-1837), their three children (aged one to three) and one maid. One of their (later) children was the educator and politician Christian Flor.

=== Peder Amunsen ===
The property was later acquired by skipper Peder Amunsen. His property was home to 19 residents in three households at the 1801 census. Amunsen resided in one of the apartments with his wife Christine Amunsen (née Fdatter), their 21-year-old son Amun Peder (helmsman), his 16-year-old niece Ane Johanne and one maid. Hans Tønnesen (1758-1807), another skipper, resided in another apartment with his wife Maren (née Jensdatter Juul, 1769–1822), their five children (aged one to 11), an 11-year-old niece, one maid and two lodgers. Cathrine Plato, a 69-year-old widow, resided in the third apartment with one maid and one lodger.

The property was listed as No. 89 in the new cadastre of 1806. It was at that time still owned by Peder Ammondsen.

=== Johan Dithlev Birch ===
The property was home to 13 residents in three households at the 1834 census. Johan Dithlev Birch (1778-1850), a master goldsmith, resided in the building with his three children (aged 11 to 18), a housekeeper and a maid. Niels Jørgensen, a courier at the Finance Department, resided in the building with his three children (aged five to 14) and a housekeeper. Frederich Christian Amundsen, a customs officer, resided alone in the third apartment.

Birch's property was home to 11 residents in three households in 1840. Birch occupied both the ground floor and the first floor of the building at that time. He lived there with two of his children and one maid. Niels Jørgensen, a police officer, resided on the second floor with his three children (aged 11 to 20), his sister-in-law Sophie Magdalene Lytzen and one maid. Frederik Christian Amundsen was still residing alone on the third floor.

The property was home to 16 residents in five households at the 1845 census. The 67-year-old Birch was now resident on the second floor with the lodger Frederich de Conich and one maid. Gudrun Johnsen, a 48-year-old unmarried restaurateur, resided on the ground floor with her 18-year-old niece Mandfrede Asgrimsen, the 24-year-old short-term visitor from Trondheim Marie Wraamann and the 30-year-old seamstress Rosa Magnusen. Jón Hjaltalin, an army surgeon associated the 5th Battalion, resided on the first floor with his wife Karen Jacobine Hjaltelin and one maid. Frederich Christian Amunsen resided in the building with his 22-year-old nephew by the same name (baker). Christian Andersen, a master tobacco binder (tobaksbindermester), resided in the building with his wife Caroline Magrethe Andersen, their one-year-old son and one maid.

=== Julius Aagaard ===
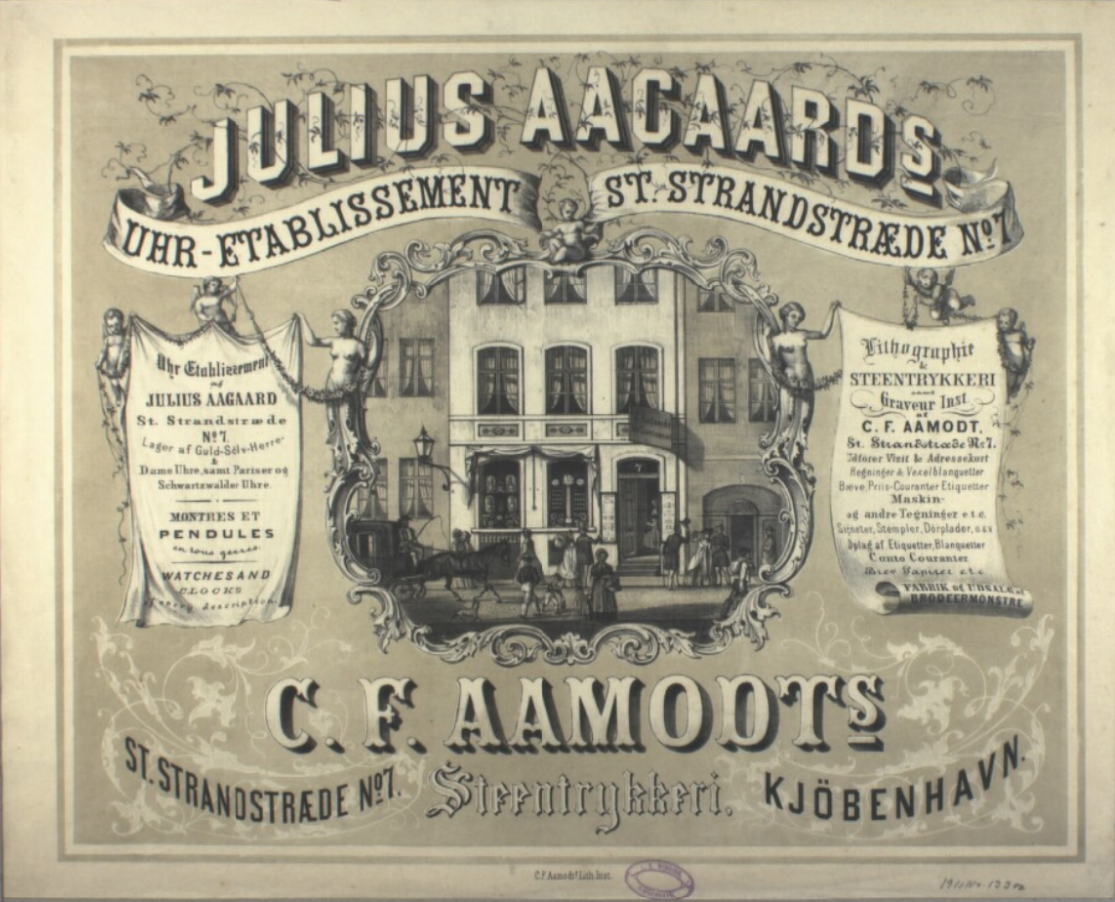
Advertisement for Julius Ågård

The property was acquired by clockmaker Julius Aagaard ub around 1850. The property was home to 24 residents in eight households at the time of the 1850 census. Julius Aagaard resided alone on the ground floor. Lars Rasmus Schou, a grocer (høkerkræmmer), resided on the first floor with his wife Karen Marie Schou, their one-year-old son, an apprentice, a maid and the former owner of the property Birch. Frederik Christian Amonsen resided alone on the second floor. Gudrun Brynjulsison, an Icelandic widow, resided on the second floor with her son Gisle Brynjulsison Peter Samuel, a workman, resided on the ground floor of the rear wing with his wife Marie Samuel and their six children (aged one to 11). Jørgen Hansen, another workman, resided on the first floor of the rear wing with his wife Ane Magrethe. Ole Mehlstrøm, a tailor, resided on the second floor of the rear wing with his 13-year-old son Johannes Gabriel. Christian Dreier, a musician in the Royal Life Guards' music corps, resided on the third floor of the rear wing with his wife Hansine Dreier.

Julius Aagaard (22 November 1822 - 12 February 1897) owned the building until 1896 and ran his clock business from the premises.

=== 20th century ===
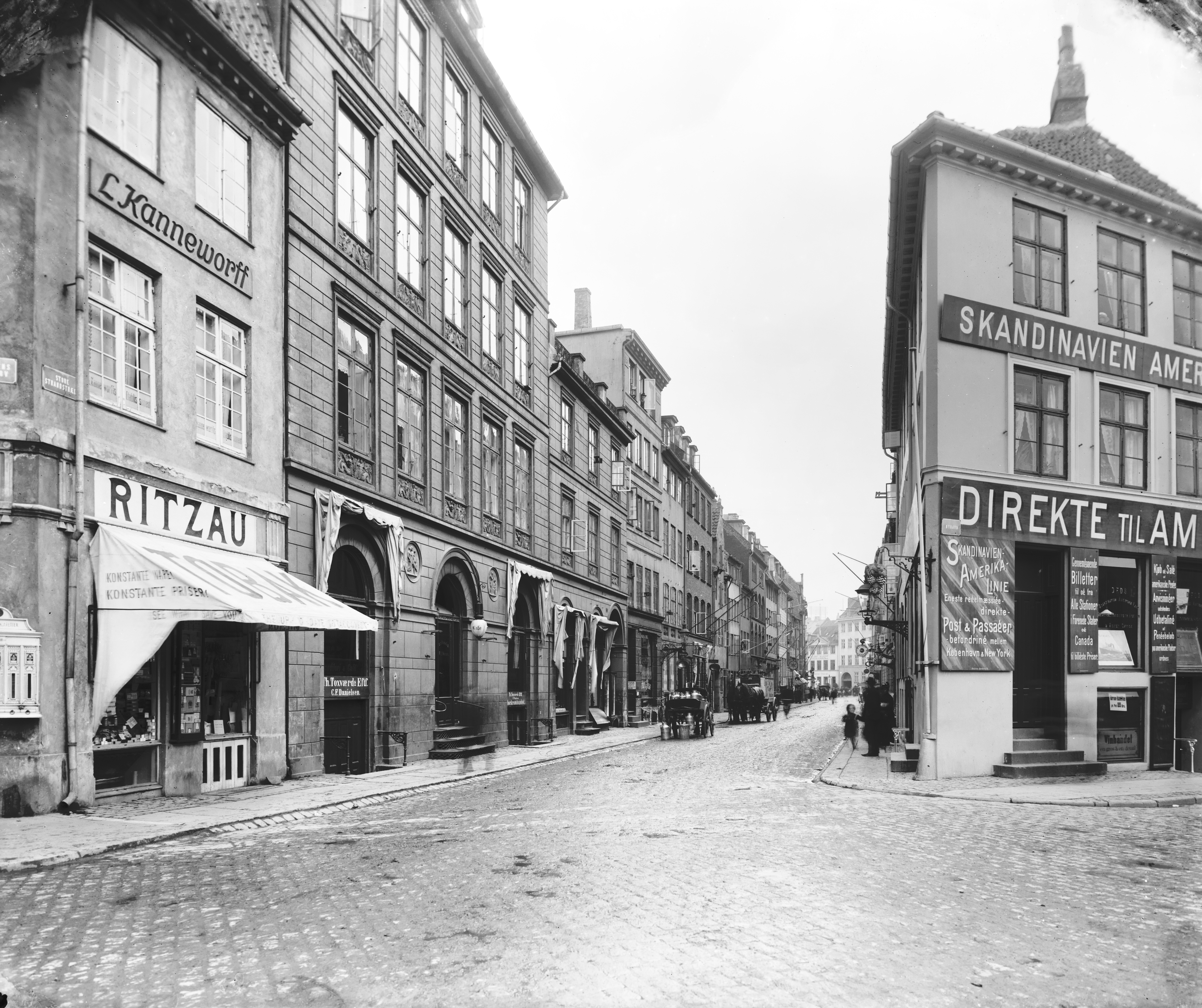
Store Strandstræde 7, seen in a photograph by Johannes Hauerslev

The writer Kjeld Abell (1901-1961) resided in the second floor apartment from 1955 to 1961.

== Architecture ==
The building is just three bays wide. A five-bay side wing extends from the rear side of the building. It is connected to a two-bay rear wing.

== Today ==
Store Strandstræde 7 was owned by Sme APS in 2008.

== See also ==
- Axel E. Aamodts lithografiske Etablissement
