= Grandjean House =

Late Neoclassical property consisting of two separate buildings in Copenhagen, Denmark

Coordinates: 55.6780°N 12.5805°E

- Grandjeans Gård
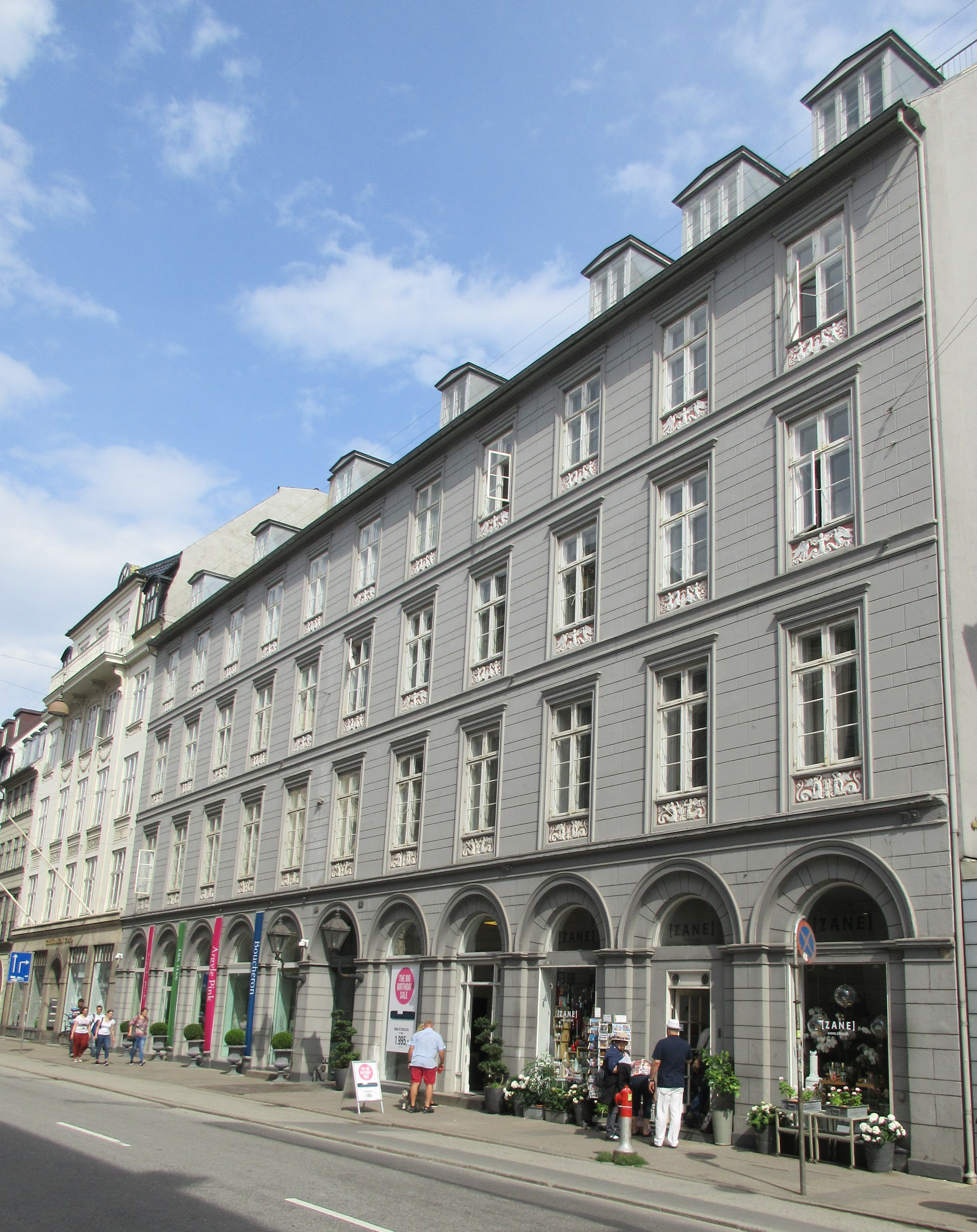
- The building on Bredgade
- Interactive map of the Grandjean House area

General information
- Architectural style: Late Neoclassical
- Location: Copenhagen, Denmark, Denmark
- Completed: 1854
- Client: Christian Bredo Grandjean

Design and construction
- Architect: Christian Tybjerg

The Grandjean House (Danish: Grandjeans Gård) is a Late Neoclassical property consisting of two separate buildings, one at Bredgade 4 and one at Store Strandstræde 3, on opposite sides of a central courtyard, in central Copenhagen, Denmark. The property is separated from Kongens Nytorv by a small building that now houses the Copenhagen Amber Museum. It was built in 1854 by the architect Christian Tybjerg for pastry chef Christian Bredo Grandjean. It replaced an older building, which was known as the Collin House after Hans Christian Andersen patron Jonas Collin, but this name is now associated with another building in Amaliegade. The Grandjean House was listed on the Danish registry of protected buildings and places in 1959.

== History ==
=== Early history ===
In the 18th century, the site was part of a somewhat larger property. A house built at the site in the 17th century was for a time the residence of Bernardino de Rebolledo, the Spanish ambassador to Denmark. He came to Copenhagen in 1647. Remains of a relief with his coat of arms is embedded in the wall of the building in the courtyard. It dates from the previous building on the site. The relief was formerly installed on the facade of the present building. It was later moved to make way for a kringle.

The property was by 1689 as No. 86 in St. Ann's East Quarter (Sankt Annæ Øster Kvarter) owned by assessor Johan Pedersen Klein. It was later divided into what is now Bredgade 4 and Bredgade 6.

The building was in 1733 acquired by Tønnes Becker, a wealthy timber merchant and one of the City's 32 Men.

=== The Collin family ===
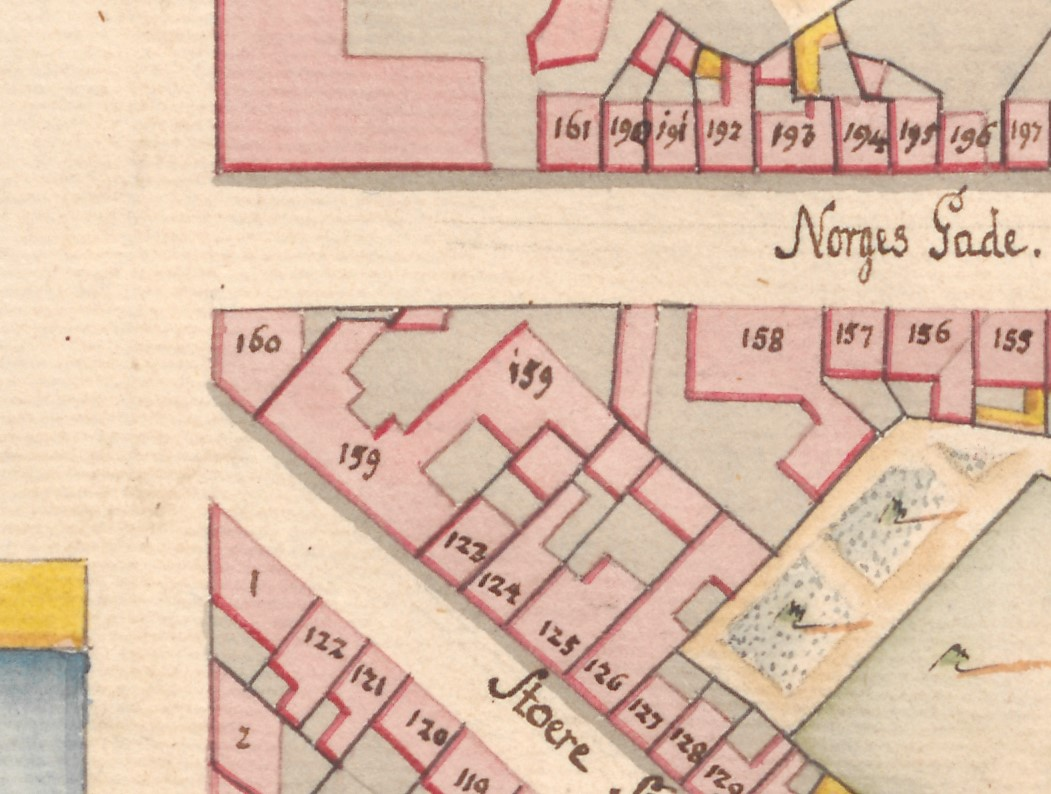
No. 159 seen in a detail from Christian Gedde's map of St. Ann's East Quarter, 1757

The property was listed in the new cadastre of 1756 as No. 159 in St. Ann's East Quarter (Sankt Annæ Øster Kvarter). It was owned by Jonas Baltzersen Collin (1705–1770) at that time. He was active as a merchant, industrialist and director of the Class Lottery. On his death, the property passed to his son Niels Collin (1736–1797).

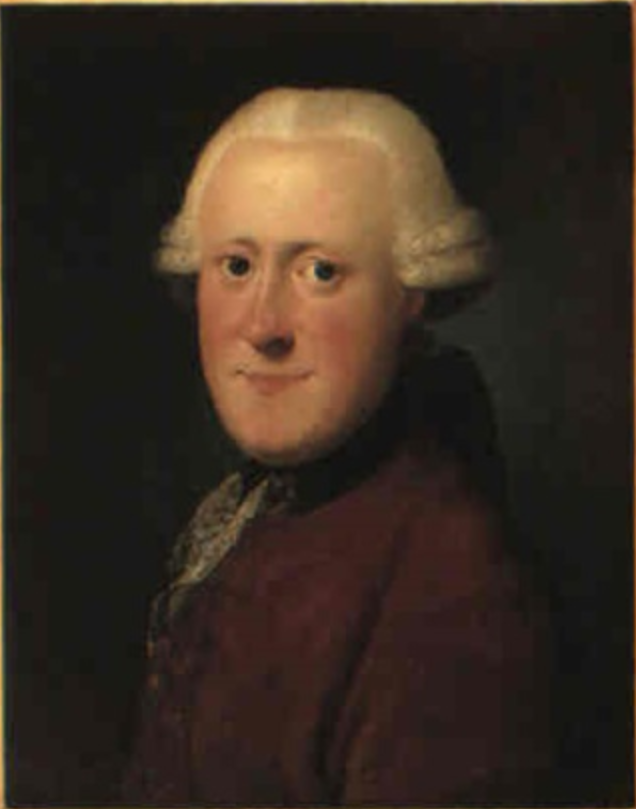
Niels Collin painted by Jens Juel, 1770

The property was home to three households at the time of the 1787 census. Niels Collin resided in the building with his wife Ingeborg (née Bolte), their 11-year-old son Jonas, his sister-in-law sister Marta Bolte and one maid. Thiel Erich Stibolt, a naval officer with rank of commander-captain, resided in the building with his wife Chatrina Bille, their two daughters (aged 23 and 28), one male servant, two maids and one lodger (a cadet). The third household consisted of Niels Lange, his wife Pouline Wildschiøt and a maid.

Ingebrog Collin kept the property after her husband's death.

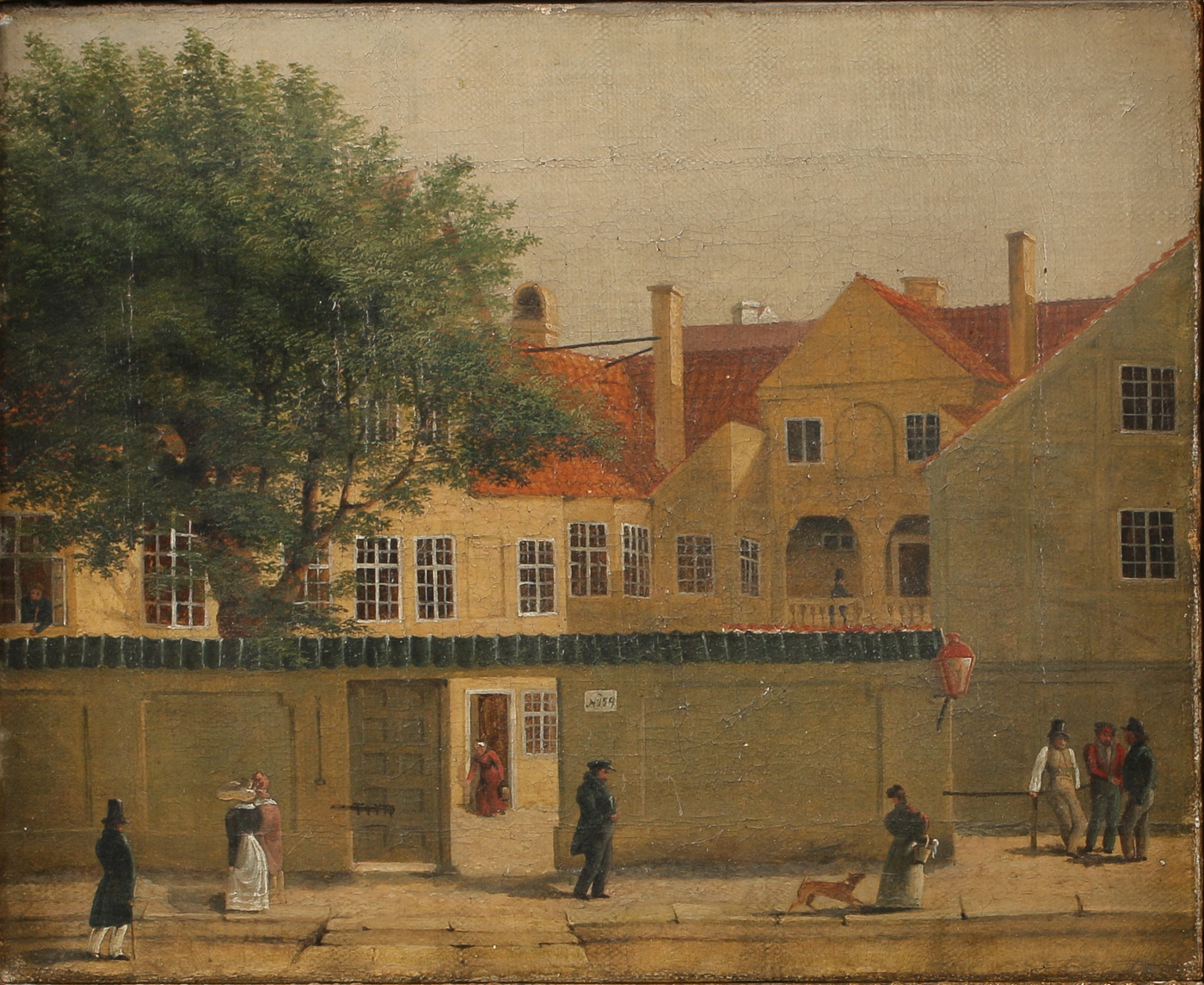
The Collin House in Bredgade painted by Fritz Petzholdt

The property was again home to three households at the 1801 census. Ingeborg Collin resided in the building with her son Jonas Collin (then registered as a surveyor), her sister Margrethe Bolten and one maid. Jacob Buntzen, a customs officer, resided in the building with his wife Elisabeth (née Rothe), their two children (aged 11 and 22) and one maid. Søren Petersen Kiær, a textile merchant (hosekræmmeren), resided in the building with his wife Wilhelmine Wyrtzen, their two-year-old son Peter Wilhelm Kiær, two employees in Kiær's textile business (one of them an apprentice) and one maid.

The property was again listed as No. 159 in the new cadastre of 1806. It was still owned by Ingeborg Collin at that time.

The property was later passed to Jonas Collin. Allegedly, he decided to move when it rained through the ceiling and onto the table in the presence of Bertel Thorvaldsen. In 1839, he therefore purchased Amaliegade (No. 9).

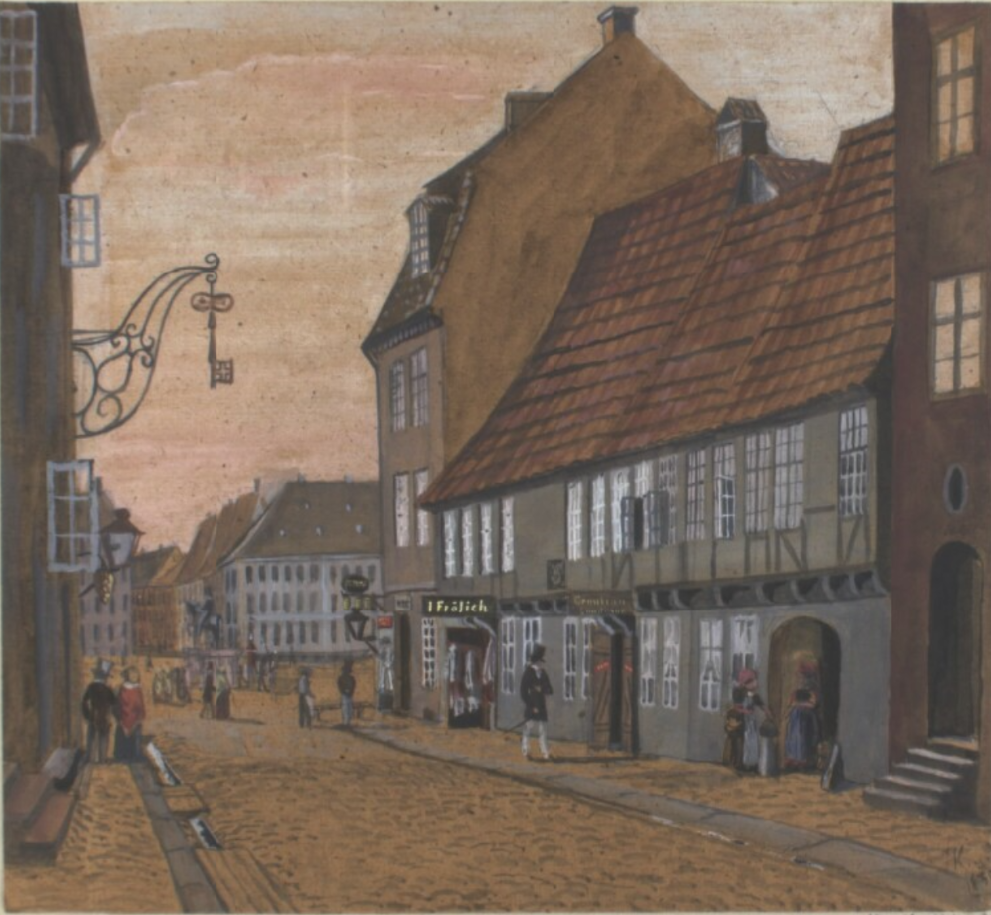
The building facing Store Strandstræde seen in a painting from 1835

Collin's old house in Bredgade was home to 35 residents in four households at the time of the 1840 census. Johannes Frolich, a textile merchant, resided on the ground floor with his wife Maren Hornbeck, their five children (aged five to 19), his sister-in-law Rasmus Gangsted, a merchant (employee), a merchant's apprentice and a maid. Jacobbine Otto, the widow of a pastry baker, resided on the ground floor with her 21-year-old daughter Georggine Marie Otto, two pastry bakers, an apprentice, one male servant and one maid. Jacob Frederik Schmoch, a master mason, resided on the first floor with his wife Ane Catrina Schmoch, their six children (aged one to 10), one maid and three lodgers. Clausine Henne, the widow of a commander captain, resided on the first floor with three of her children (aged 16 to 30) and one maid.

Jonas Collin's daughter Louise, née Collin lived with her new husband W. Lind at Bredgade 4 following their marriage on 25 November 1840.

=== Grandjean family ===
Jonas Collin sold the property at Store Strandstræde to the pastry chef Christian Frederik Bredo Grandjean, who was already operating a konditori from a pavilion in the courtyard behind the main house.

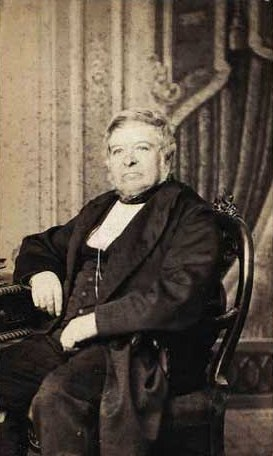
Grandjean

The property was home to 36 residents in four households at the 1845 census. Christian Grandjean (1811-1877) resided in the building with his wife Caroline Toxværd (1810-1899), their two sons (aged four and 12) and six servants. Johannes Frølich, a grocer (hørkræmmer), resided in the building with his wife Maren Frølich, their six children (aged three to 24), one male servant and one maid. Jacob Schmock, a master mason and second lieutenant in the Copenhagen Fire Corps, resided in the building with his wife Ane Schmock, their seven children (aged two to 22) and one maid. Wilkens Lind, a senior clerk and auditor, resided in the building with his wife Louise Collin, their two daughters (aged two and four) and two maids.

Christian and Karen Grandjean's third son, Axdel Grandjean, who would later become a composer, was born in March 1847. Their eldest son Johannes died at an early age. The son Harald Hrandjean (1841-1925) grew up to become an army officer, who reached the rank of colonel-lieutenant.

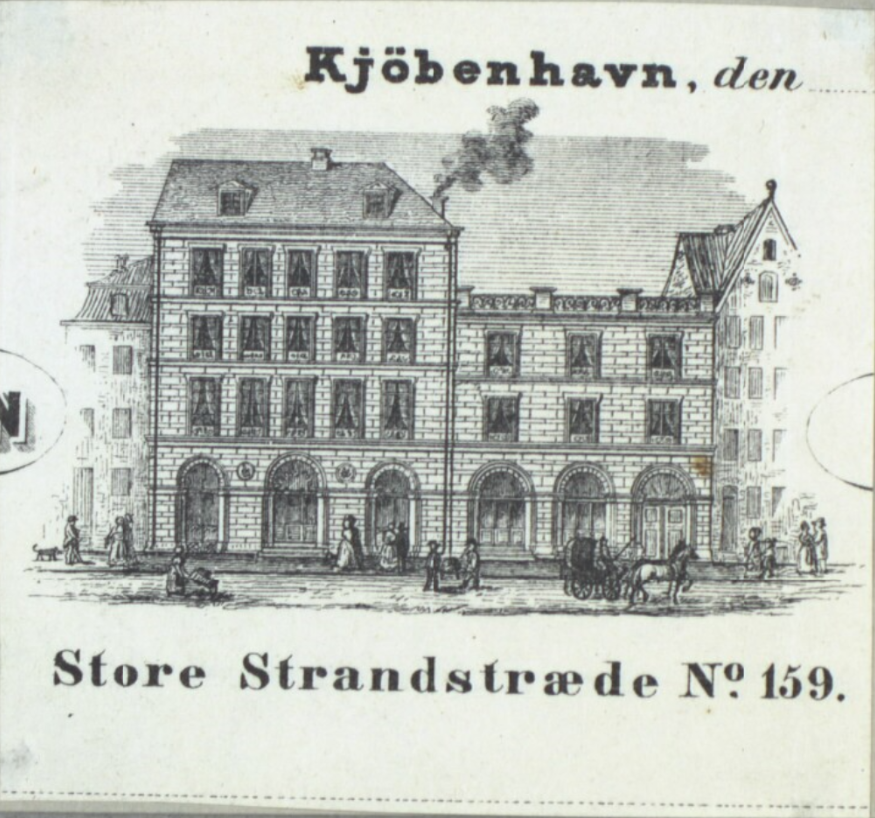
The new building facing Store Strandstræde

The present building on the site was constructed for Grandjean in 1854. It was designed by the architect Christian Tyberg. Grandjean took up residence in the house and operated a restaurant and a konditori from the lower floors. It was frequented by many actors and artists, most notably Hans Christian Andersen, who was a private friend of the Grandjeans.

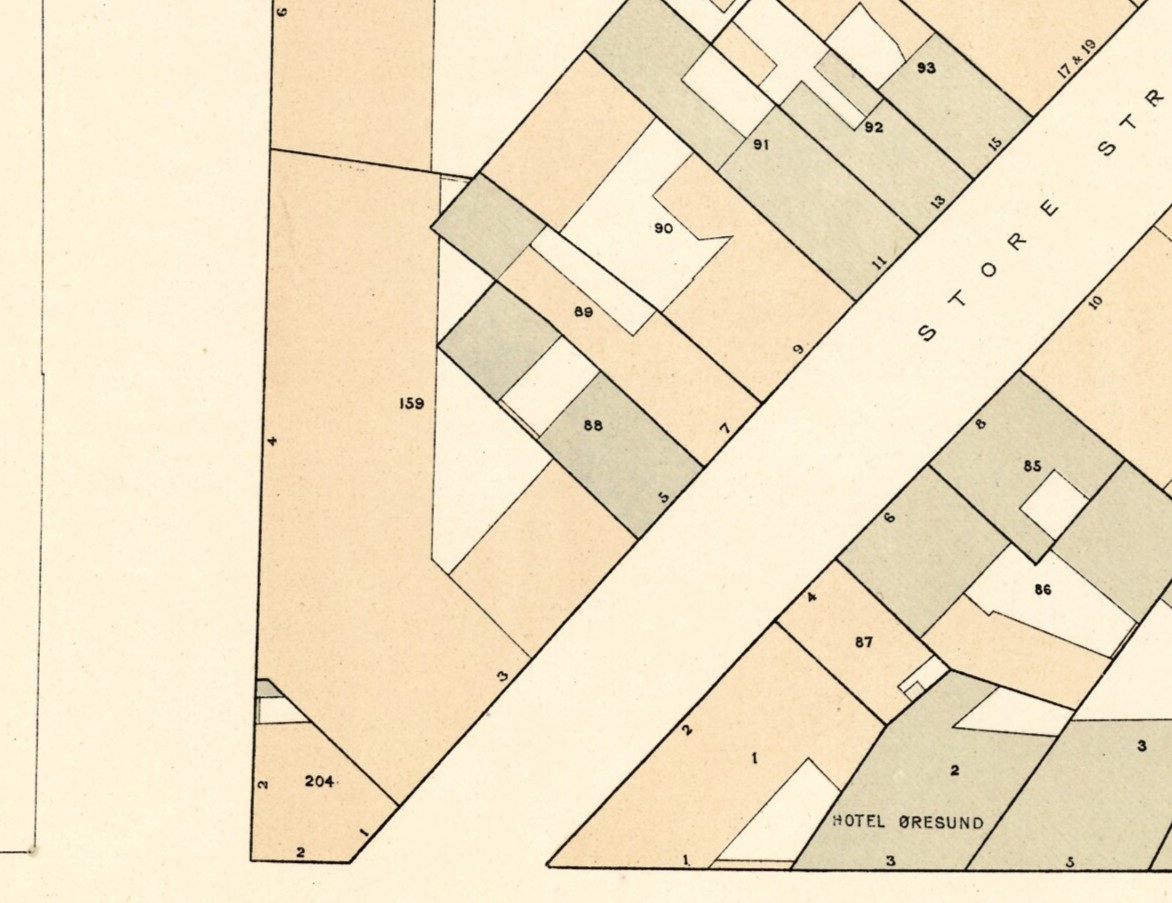
The Grandjean House seen in a detail from one of Berggreen's block plans of St. Ann's East Quarter

The property was home to 46 residents at the 1885 census. Karen Caroline Granjean, who now owned the building, resided on the second floor with her 34-year-old relative Hendrikgine Toxværd and one maid. Adolph Zacarias Cohn, a master shoemaker, resided on the ground floor and first floor with his wife Pauline Cohn, their three daughters (aged zero to four) and one maid. Peter Christian Adolph Jensen, a retailer, resided on the ground floor and second floor with his wife Augusta Loise Jensen. Lars Rote Haugsted, a pastry chef, resided on the ground floor and the fourth floor with his wife Anna Chatrine Haugsted, their four-year-old daughter Albert Luis Haugsted, his grandmother Anna Chatrine Haugsted, his sister Anna Dorthea Haugsted, a male servant, a female cook, a nanny and three maids. Harald Hirschsprung, a medical doctor, resided on the first floor with his wife Mariane Hirschsprung, their three daughters (aged 16 to 21), a female cook and a maid, two sisters and one maid. Caroline Amalie Hasset, a widow, resided on the second floor with her daughter Agnete Hasset, a female cook and a maid. Georg Bestle, a wine merchant, resided on the third floor with his wife Caroline Sophie Bestle and the female teacher Karoline Kok. Andreas Conrad Putscher Linde, a high-ranking civil servant in the Ministry of Education, resided on the same floor with his wife Johanne Amalie Linde, their 34-year-old daughter Gabriele Amalie Linde, a female cook and a maid.

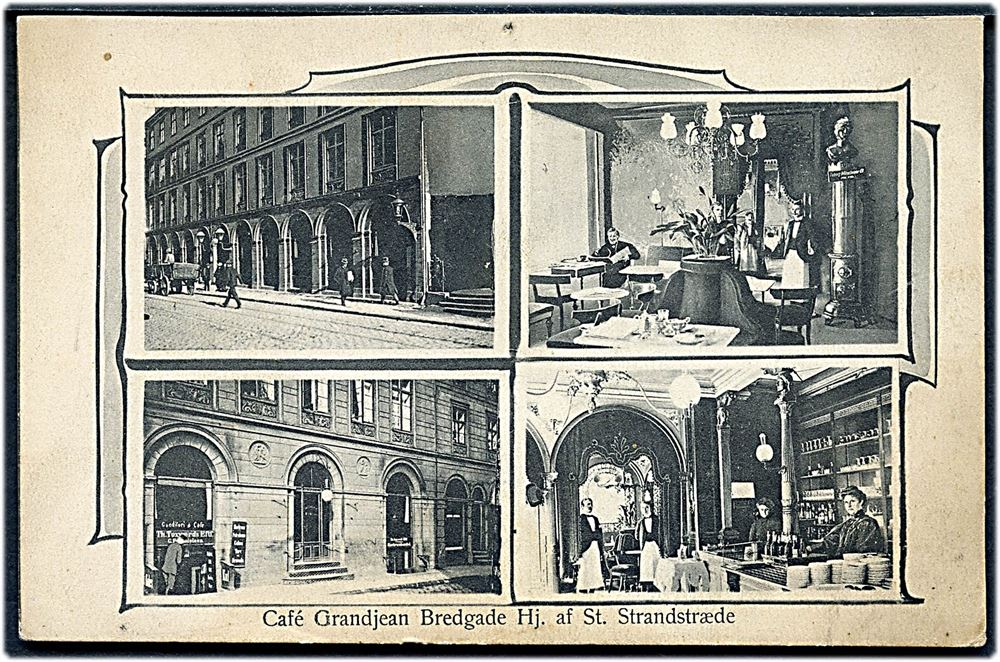
Café Grandjean

The property was later owned by Harald and Axel Grandjean. Café Grandjean was replaced by a restaurant in around 1900. It is now called Restaurant Els.

== Architecture ==
The property consists of two individual buildings: a large, 11-bay building towards Bredgade 4 (No. 4) and a five-bay building towards Store Strandstræde. The complex was constructed with four floors towards Bredgade but only three floors towards Store Strandstræde to allow for better air circulation in the courtyard. The large, arched windows in the ground floor, a typical feature of commercial properties from the Late Neoclassical period (1830–1855), were a novelty in Denmark at the time. Next to it is a narrow three-bay building over four floors on Store Strandstræde. The architect originally made a design proposal which comprised the corner on Kongens Nytorv but Grandjean failed to acquire the small Kanneworff House which now houses Copenhagen Amber Museum. The former konditori contains six murals by Christian Hetsch.

== Today ==
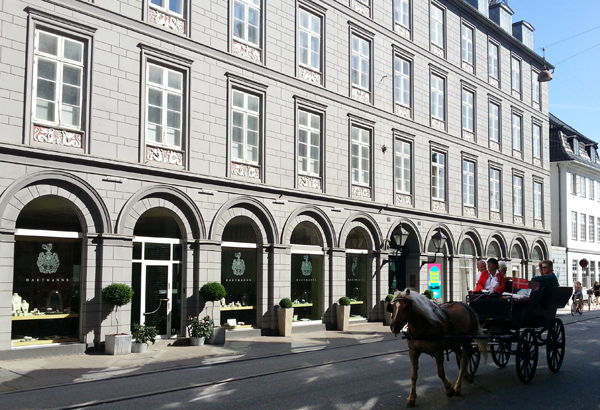
The Grandjean House

The complex is owned by the fifth generation of the Grandjean family. Restaurant Els is located at Store Strandstræde 3. It serves seasonal cuisine and the décor includes tables that were specially manufactured for the restaurant by Royal Copenhagen. The ground floor also contains several stores, including an Yvonne Koné flagship store.

== See also ==
- Josty
- Store Strandstræde 7
