= House of Amber =

Danish producer of amber jewelry (1933)

- Type: Private, Limited Liability Company
- Industry: Jewellery; retail; craftsmanship; amber jewellery
- Founded: 1933
- Founder: Einer Fehrn
- Headquarters: Copenhagen, Denmark
- Number of locations: 40+ stores
- Area served: Worldwide
- Key people: Jens Heimburger (Owner) Lars Bladt (Group CEO) Pia Fons (Managing Director)
- Website: houseofamber.com

House of Amber is a Danish producer of amber jewelry.

== History ==
The company was founded in 1933 by Danish Einer Fehrn.

In 2007, Dansk Generationsskifte A/S took over the firm.

Today, House of Amber sells its products in the old Kanneworffs House at Nyhavn, on Vesterbrogade near Tivoli, and on the famous main pedestrian street in the centre of Copenhagen, Denmark.

== Retail stores ==
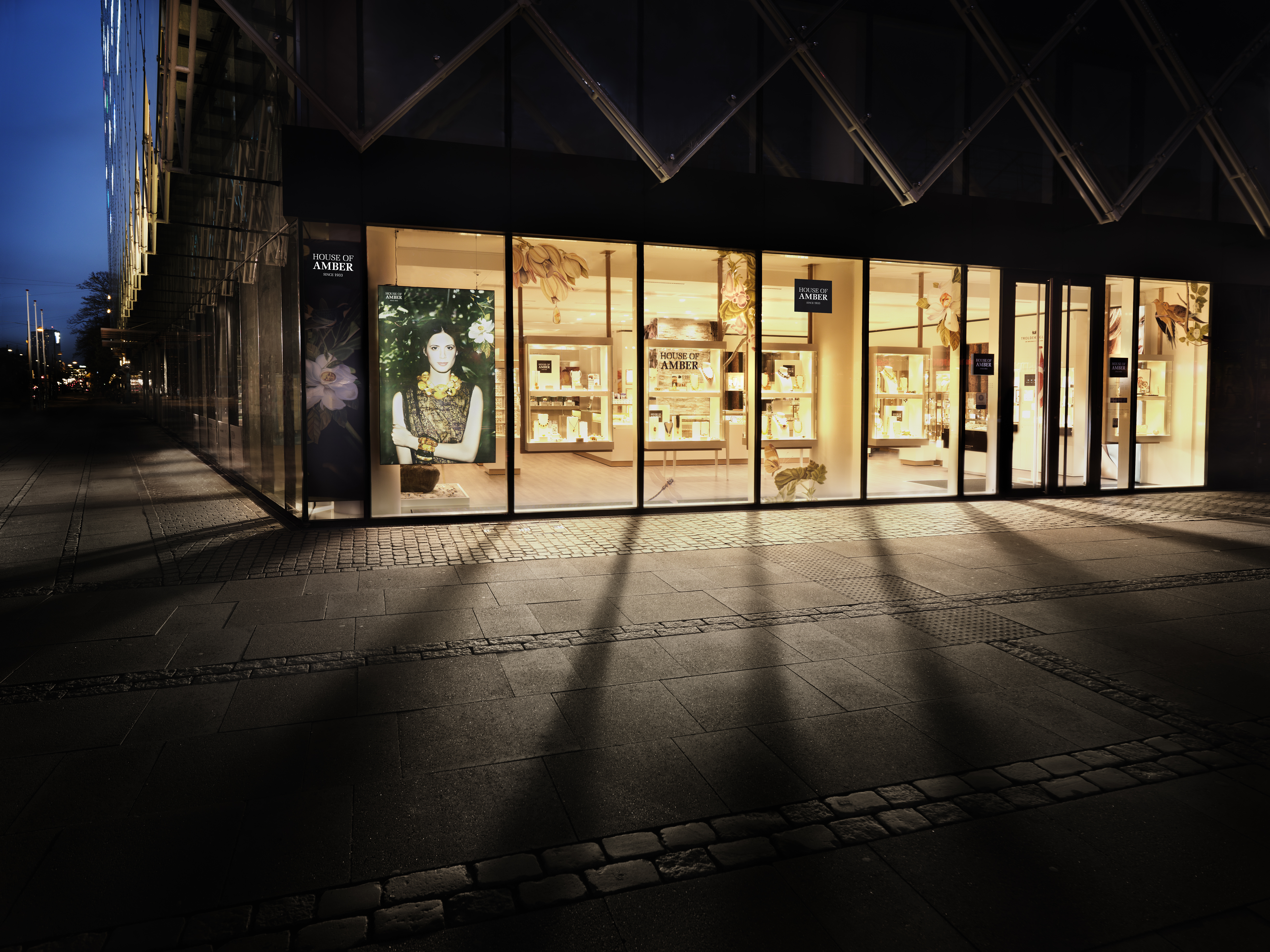
The flagship store on Vesterbrogade in Copenhagen.

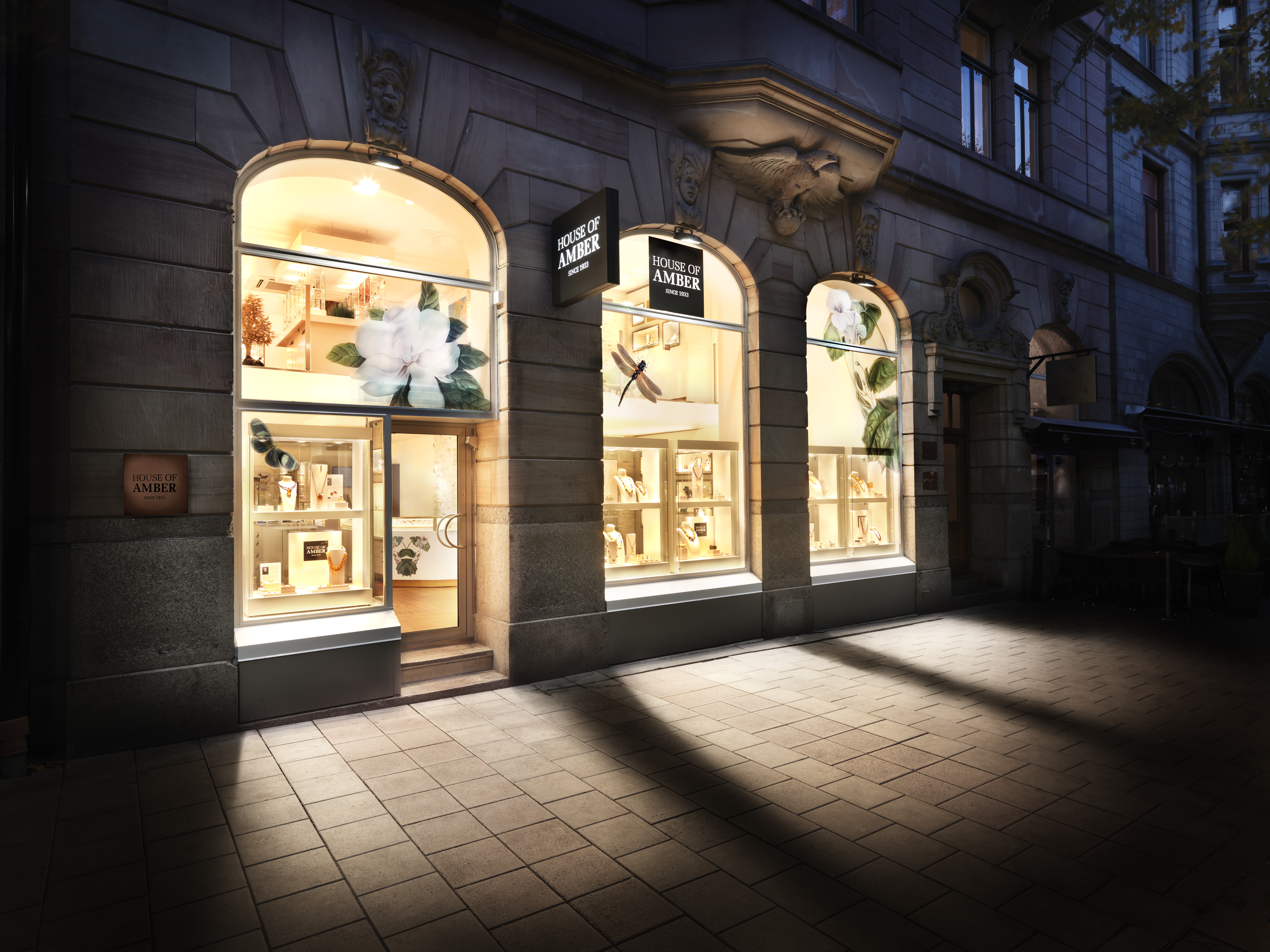
House of Amber opened its first flagship store in Stockholm in mid June 2014.

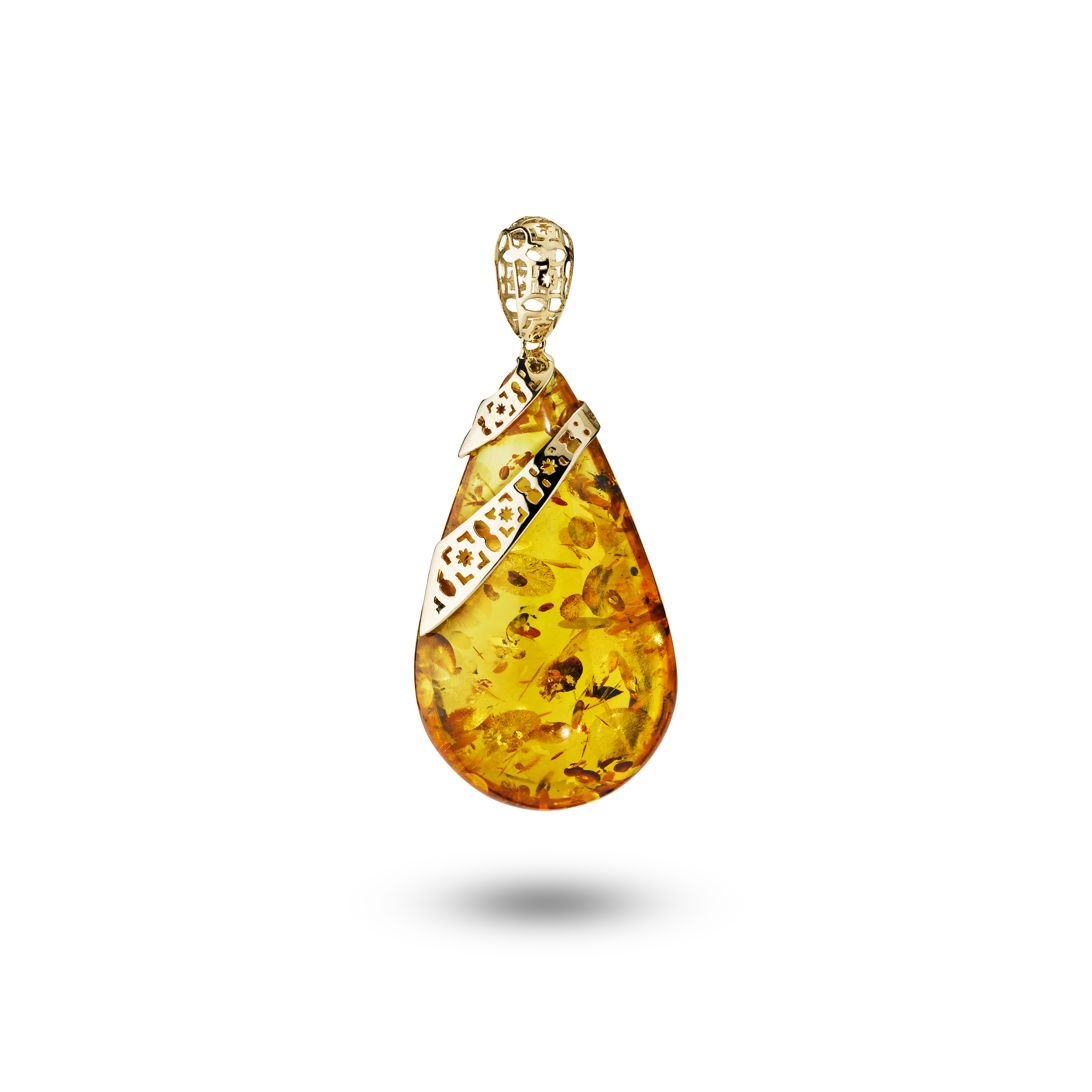

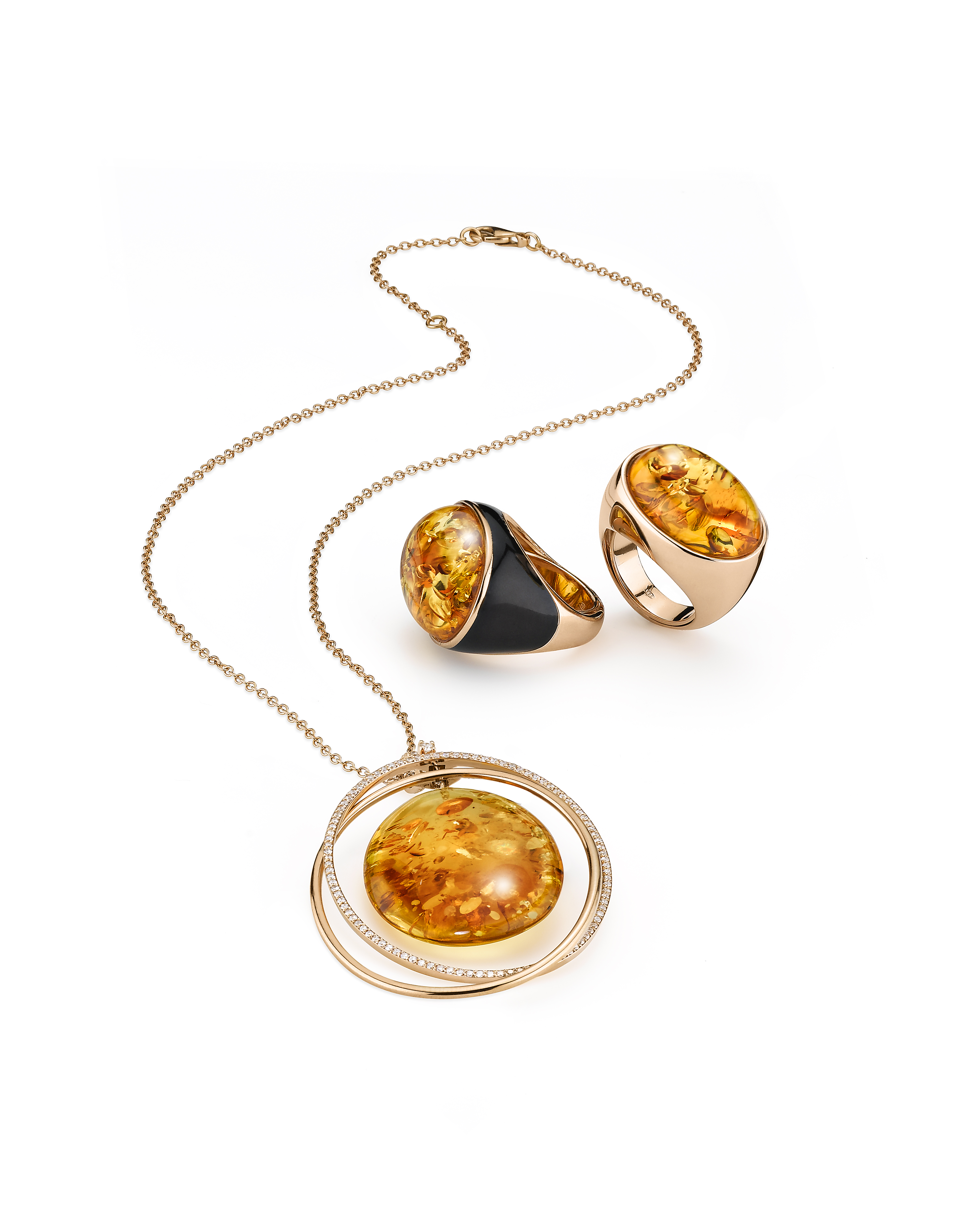

House of Amber operates more than 40 stores in 7 countries and also runs the Copenhagen Amber Museum.

- Flagship Stores:
  - Copenhagen
  - Stockholm, Sweden
  - Solvang, California
  - Macau
  - Helsinki
  - Georgetown, Malaysia

== Timeline ==
- 1933 - Einar Fehrn founded the company in 1933 under the name Ravfehrn. The company was founded as an amber wholesaler. The customers were primarily local goldsmiths.
- 1962 - Einar Fehrn's son, Søren Fehrn entered the company where he began grinding and polishing amber pieces.
- 1965 - House of Amber opened its first workshop with one employee
- 1980s- The company began focusing on refining the production of amber jewelry.
- 1988 - House of Amber opened a branch in Gdansk, Poland with 16 employees.
- 1993 - The head office was moved to Frederiksberg, Copenhagen. At that time the company had 28 employees
- 1994 - House of Amber opened its first signature shop at Kongens Nytorv 2 in the Kanneworffs House; one of the oldest buildings in Copenhagen, built in 1606.
- 1994 - House of Amber opened Copenhagen Amber Museum in the same building. The museum was developed to house private amber collections which included some of the world’s largest pieces of Baltic amber, as well as amber antiques and artefacts.
- 1997 - A small shop opened at the harbour pier in Copenhagen.
- 2002 - House of Amber's biggest shop opened at Vesterbrogade next to Tivoli.
- 2003 - The fifth shop opened at Gammel Torv in the famous main pedestrian street.
- 2007 - Dansk Generationsskifte took over the company in 2007 and continued the Fehrn family’s lifelong work under the new name, House of Amber.
- 2008 - House of Amber opened its head office in Beijing and the first five shops in China.
- 2011 - House of Amber opened its head office in Shanghai and a new shop in Hong Kong.
- 2012 - House of Amber opened its webpage and webshop in 2013.
- 2013 - The House of Amber shop in Vesterbrogade reopened following reconstruction and is today House of Amber' flagship store in Denmark.
- 2013 - House of Amber celebrated its 80th anniversary with a special edition collection.
- 2014 - House of Amber and National Gemstone Testing Center of China entered a cooperation.
- 2014 - A new flagship store was opened in Stockholm
- 2015 - House of Amber opened a new flagship store in Macau
- 2015 - A new flagship store was opened in Solvang, California.
- 2015 - House of Amber and Copenhagen Amber Museum was enlisted in Guinness World Records with the largest piece of amber in the world with a weight of 47.5 kg.
- 2017 - A new flagship store was opened in Georgetown, Malaysia.

== See also ==
- Copenhagen Amber Museum
