= Grandjean Peak =

Mountain in Idaho, United States

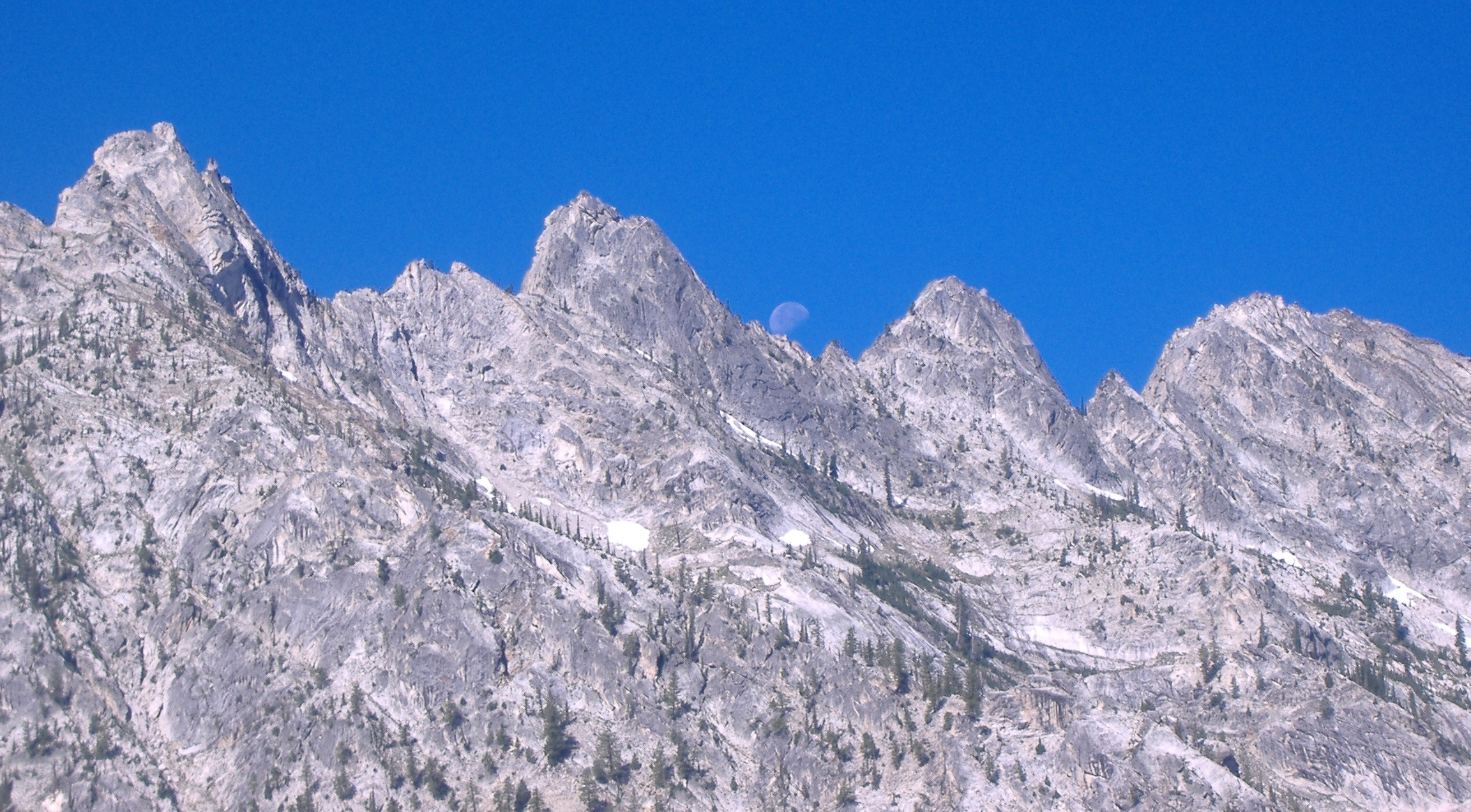
- East aspect. Left to rightː 9144, 9180 East, 9120, 9180 West

Highest point
- Elevation: 9,180 ft (2,798 m)
- Prominence: 680 ft (207 m)
- Parent peak: Tohobit Peak (10,046 ft)
- Isolation: 2.51 mi (4.04 km)
- Listing: Peaks of the Sawtooth Range
- Coordinates: 44°06′59″N 115°06′16″W

Naming
- Etymology: Emile Grandjean

Geography
- Location within Idaho Location within the United States
- Country: United States
- State: Idaho
- County: Boise
- Protected area: Sawtooth Wilderness
- Parent range: Sawtooth Range; Rocky Mountains
- Topo map: USGS Warbonnet Peak

Geology
- Rock age: Eocene
- Mountain type: Fault block
- Rock type: Granite

Climbing
- First ascent: 1994 by Greg Parker
- Easiest route: class 4

Grandjean Peak is a 9,180-foot-elevation (2,798-meter) mountain summit in Boise County, Idaho, United States.

== Description ==
Grandjean Peak is part of the Sawtooth Range which is a subset of the Rocky Mountains. This mountain with multiple high points is located 11 miles (18 km) southwest of Stanley, Idaho, in the Sawtooth Wilderness on land managed by Boise National Forest. Precipitation runoff from the mountain's slopes drains to the South Fork Payette River via Baron and Goat creeks. Topographic relief is significant as the summit rises 3,580 feet (1,090 meters) above Baron Creek in one mile (1.6 km) and 3,180 feet (970 meters) above Goat Creek in 0.85 mile (1.37 km).

== Etymology ==
The mountain is named after Emile Grandjean (1861–1942), who served as the first supervisor of Boise National Forest from 1908 to 1922. This landform's toponym has been officially adopted by the United States Board on Geographic Names.

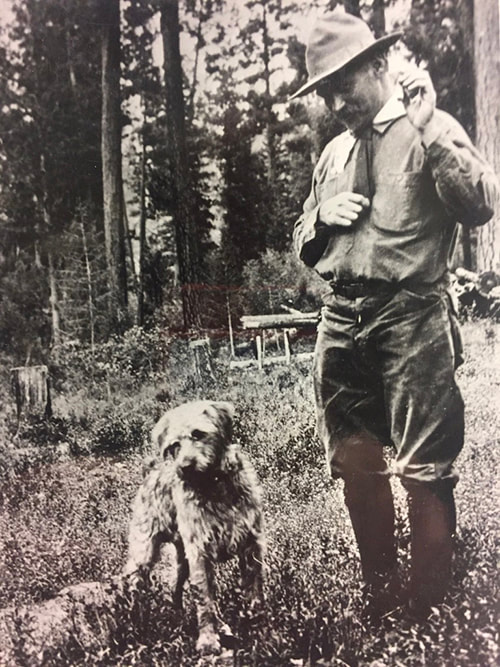
Emile Grandjean

== Climate ==
Based on the Köppen climate classification, Grandjean Peak is located in an alpine subarctic climate zone with long, cold, snowy winters, and cool to warm summers. Winter temperatures can drop below −10 °F with wind chill factors below −30 °F.

== See also ==
- List of mountain peaks of Idaho
