= Niels Jacobsen (businessman) =

- Born: 31 August 1957 (age 69); Fredericia, Denmark
- Education: Aarhus University (Cand.oecon., 1983)
- Occupations: Business executive, landowner
- Known for: CEO of Demant; Chairman of the board at Lego
- Spouse: Vibeke Rønne
- Children: 2
- Honors: Knight of the Order of the Dannebrog (2010)

Niels Jacobsen (born 31 August 1957 in Fredericia, Denmark) is a Danish business executive and landowner. He is chairman of the board at Lego Group and deputy chairman at Mærsk. He was CEO of the hearing aid company Demant until March 2017.

== Biography ==
=== Career ===
Jacobsen holds a Cand.oecon. degree from Aarhus University (1983). In 1984, he began his career as an executive assistant at Thrige-Titan A/S. He later joined Atlas A/S in 1987 in a similar role. In 1988, he became CEO of Orion A/S and, in 1992, joined William Demant Holding A/S as executive vice president, eventually becoming CEO in 1998.

At at Lego he served Chair of the board since 2008. As chairman of Lego, Jacobsen helped increase the company’s revenue from 9.5 billion DKK in 2008 to 23.4 billion DKK in 2012. During the same period, Lego's net income grew from 2.1 billion DKK to nearly 8 billion DKK. He is also vice chairman of KIRKBI A/S and chairman of the board of the Icelandic company Össur hf. As of recent reports, he holds 55 board memberships in various companies. In 2013, he was named "Chairman of the Year" by PricewaterhouseCoopers in Denmark. He is a member of VL Group 2.

=== Personal life ===
He is married to Supreme Court judge Vibeke Rønne and has two adult children from a previous marriage. His hobbies include hunting. In 1990, he inherited the estate of Williamsborg at Vejle Fjord from his father, Jens Jacobsen. Since 16 April 2010, he has been a Knight of the Order of the Dannebrog.
