= Axel E. Aamodts Lithografiske Etablissement =

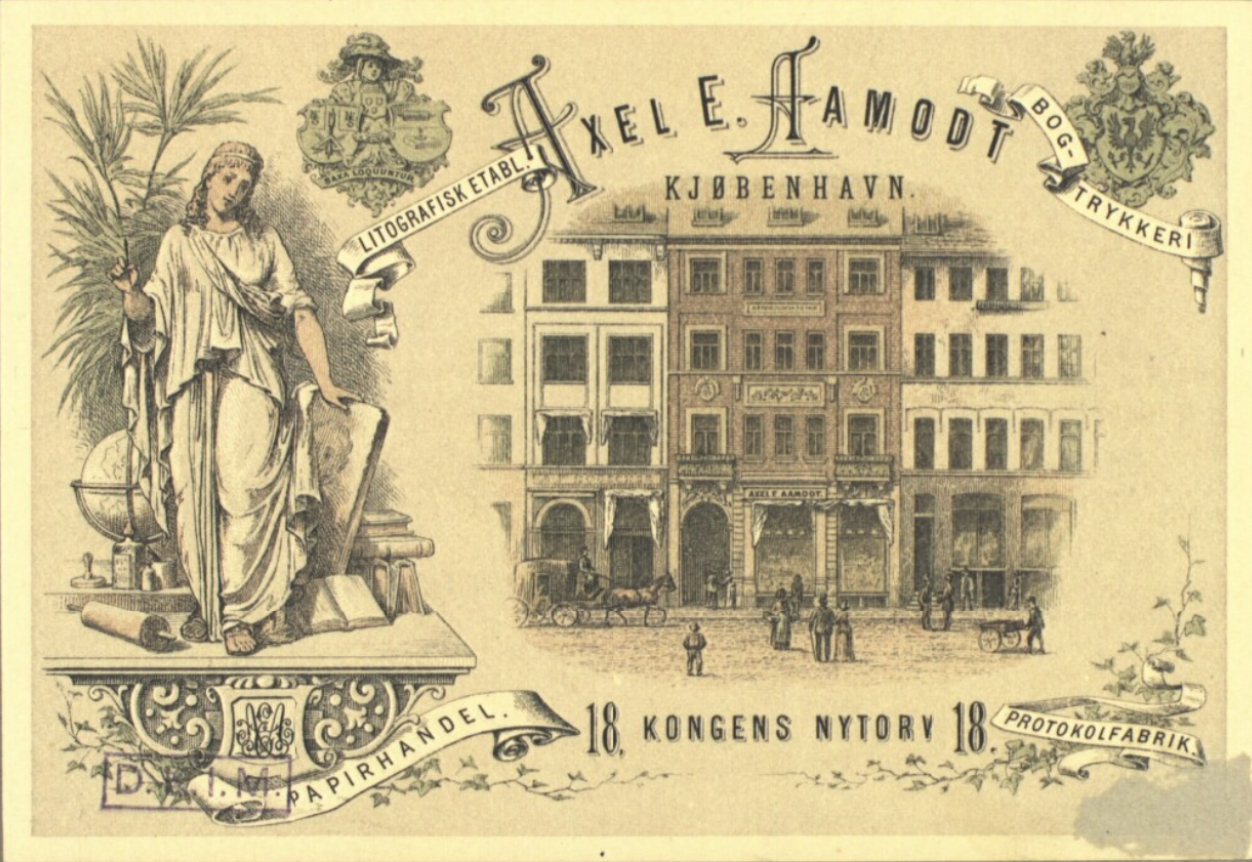
Advertisement for the company

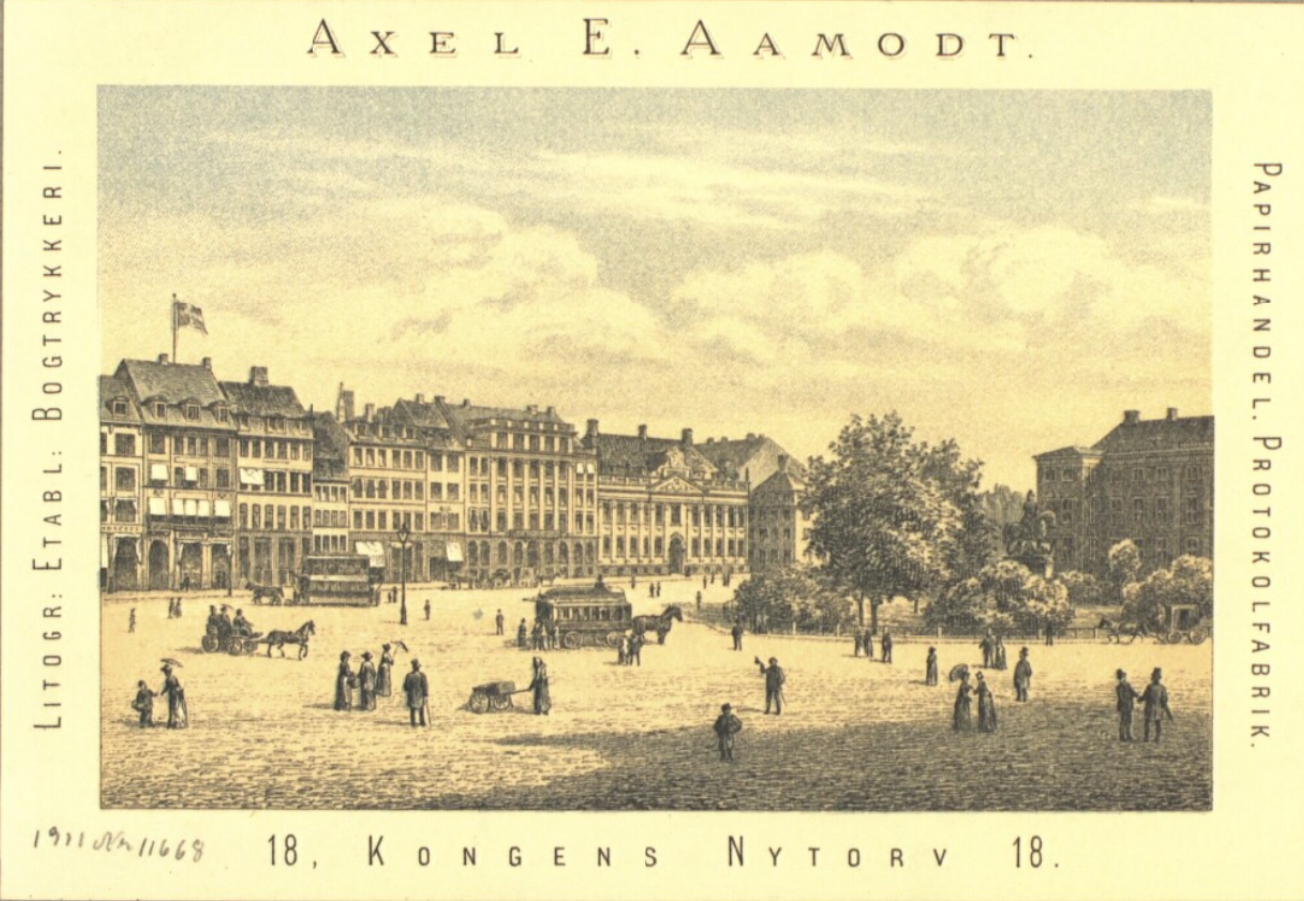
Advertisement for the company

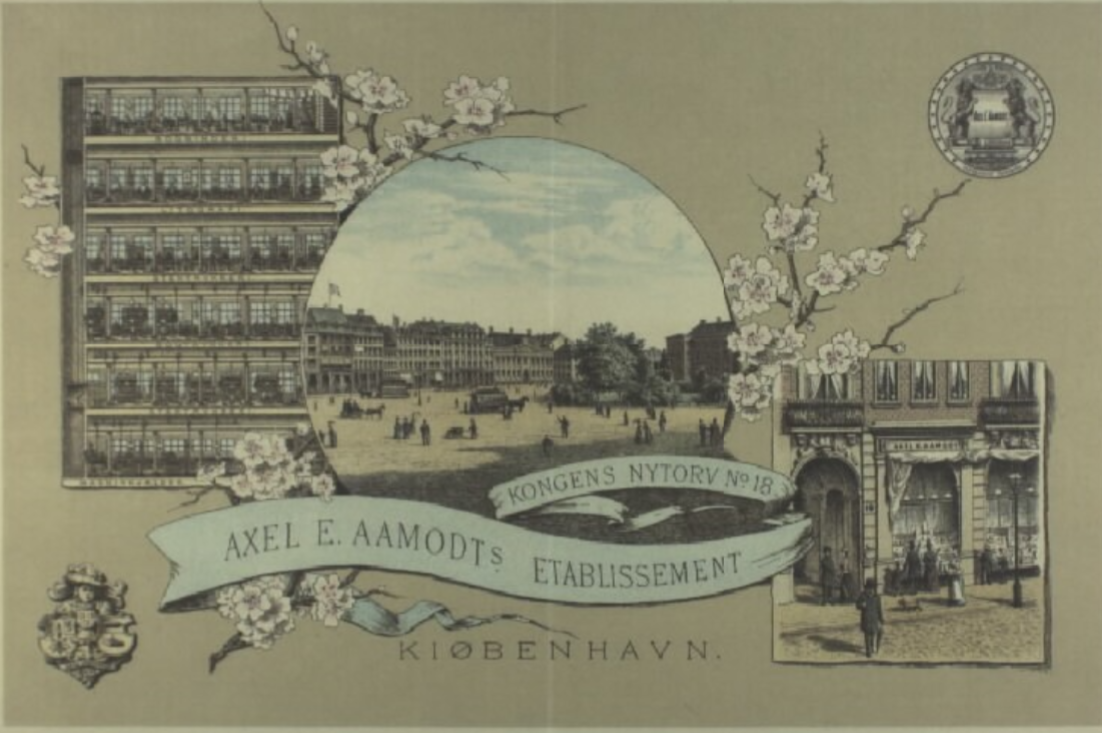
Advertisement for the company

Axel E. Aamodts lithografiske Etablissemen, originally C. F, Åmodt and later Axel E. Aamodts Eftf., was a printing business in Copenhagen, Denmark. It was located at Kongens Nytorv 18 and had status of List of Purveyors to the Court of Denmark.

== History ==
The company was founded as a lithography business by C. F. Aamodt (1830–1865) in 1857. His brother, Axel E. Aamodt (1839–1890), became a partner in the company in 1862. He changed its name to Axel E. Aamodts lithografiske Etablissement after his brother died in 1865. In 1878, he expanded into book printing.

The company was originally located at Store Strandstræde 8 but later relocated to Kongens Nytorv 18. It was granted status of List of Purveyor to the Court of Denmark.

Christian Aagaard and Carl Jansen became partners in the company in 1889 and its sole owners with Axel Åmodt's retirement the following year. Oskar Kretzschmer (1899-) was from 1835 the owner of the company.

== Works ==
The company created the maps for Salmonsens Konversationsleksikon.
