= Mystery Mountain (Idaho) =

Mountain in Idaho, United States

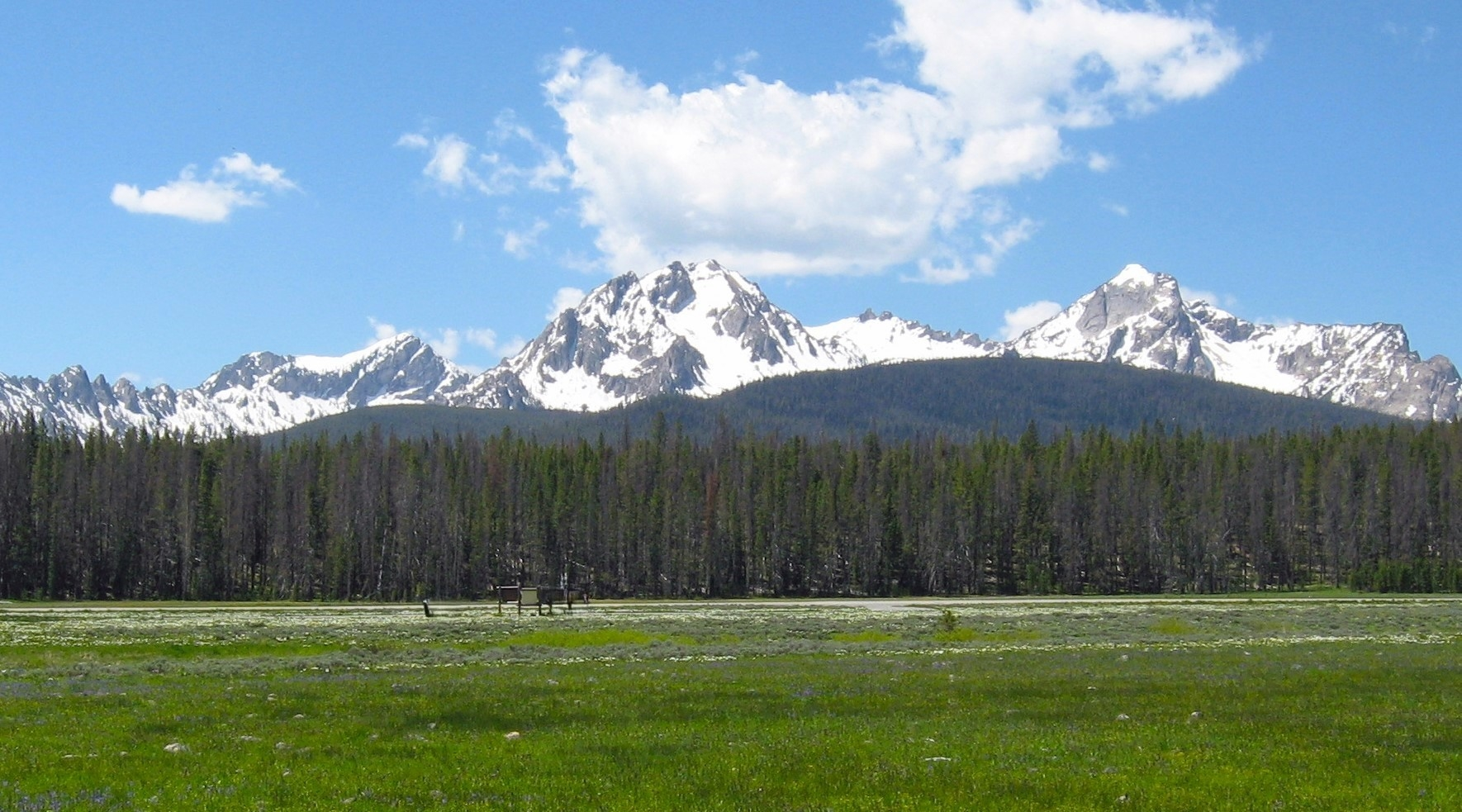
- Northeast aspect, centered

Highest point
- Elevation: 9,830 ft (2,996 m)
- Prominence: 626 ft (191 m)
- Parent peak: McGowan Peak (9,878 ft)
- Isolation: 0.80 mi (1.29 km)
- Coordinates: 44°12′22″N 115°04′05″W

Geography
- Location within Idaho Location within the United States
- Country: United States
- State: Idaho
- County: Custer
- Protected area: Sawtooth Wilderness
- Parent range: Sawtooth Range; Rocky Mountains
- Topo map: USGS Stanley Lake

Geology
- Rock age: Eocene
- Mountain type: Fault block
- Rock type(s): Granodiorite, Granite

Climbing
- Easiest route: class 2

Mystery Mountain is a 9,830-foot-elevation (2,996 m) summit in Custer County, Idaho, United States.

== Description ==
Mystery Mountain is part of the Sawtooth Range which is a subrange of the Rocky Mountains. It is situated seven miles (11 km) west of Stanley, Idaho, in the Sawtooth Wilderness on land managed by Sawtooth National Forest. The mountain can be seen from Highway 21 and from Stanley Lake. Precipitation runoff from the mountain drains to the Salmon River via Crooked Creek and Valley Creek. Topographic relief is significant as the summit rises over 3,000 feet (914 meters) above Crooked Creek in one mile (1.6 km). This mountain's toponym has not been officially adopted by the United States Board on Geographic Names.

== Climate ==
Based on the Köppen climate classification, Mystery Mountain is located in an alpine subarctic climate zone with long, cold, snowy winters, and cool to warm summers. Winter temperatures can drop below 0 °F with wind chill factors below −10 °F. Climbers can expect afternoon rain and lightning from summer thunderstorms.

== See also ==
- List of mountain peaks of Idaho
- Geology of the Rocky Mountains

== Gallery ==
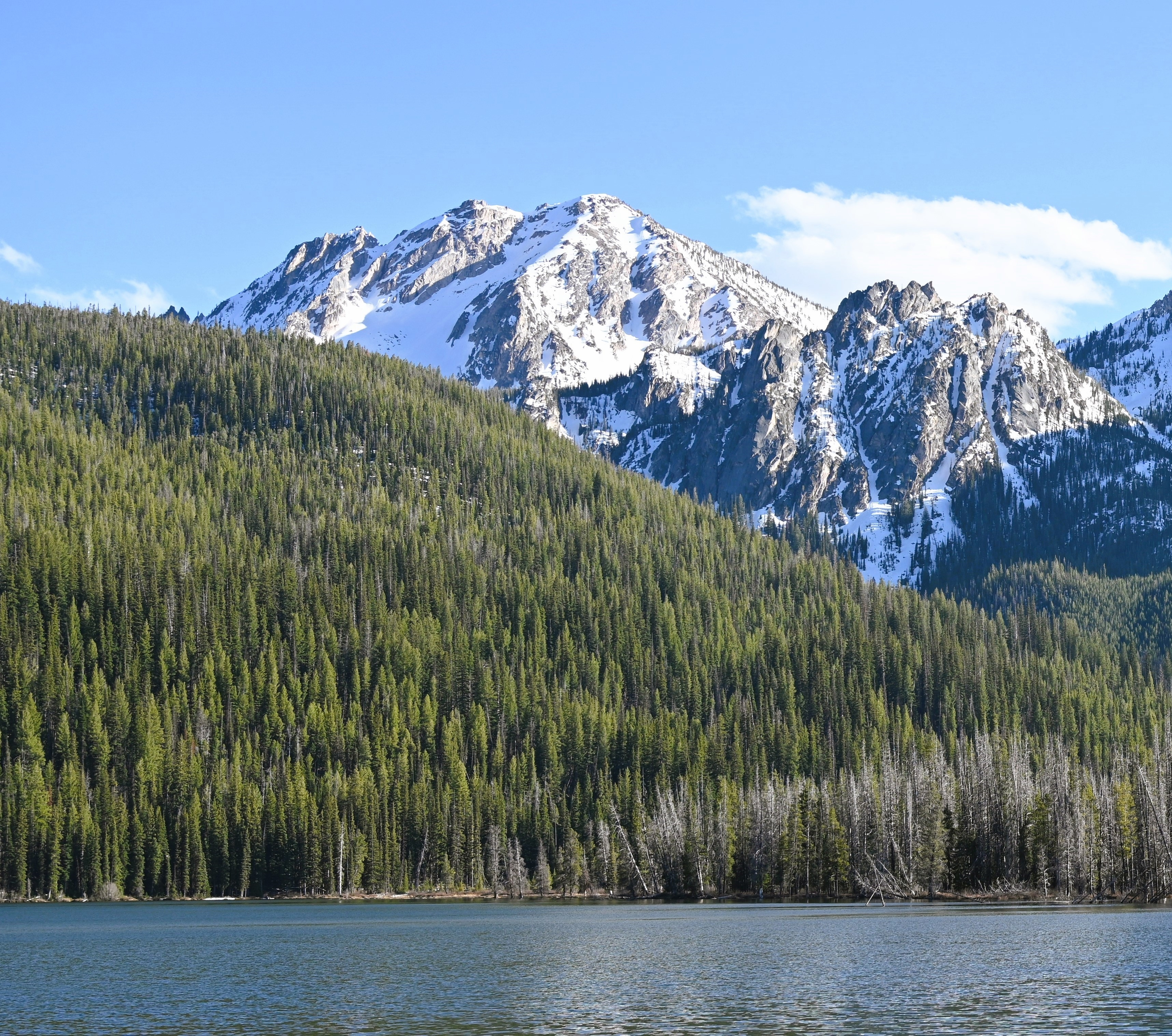
Mystery Mountain from Stanley Lake

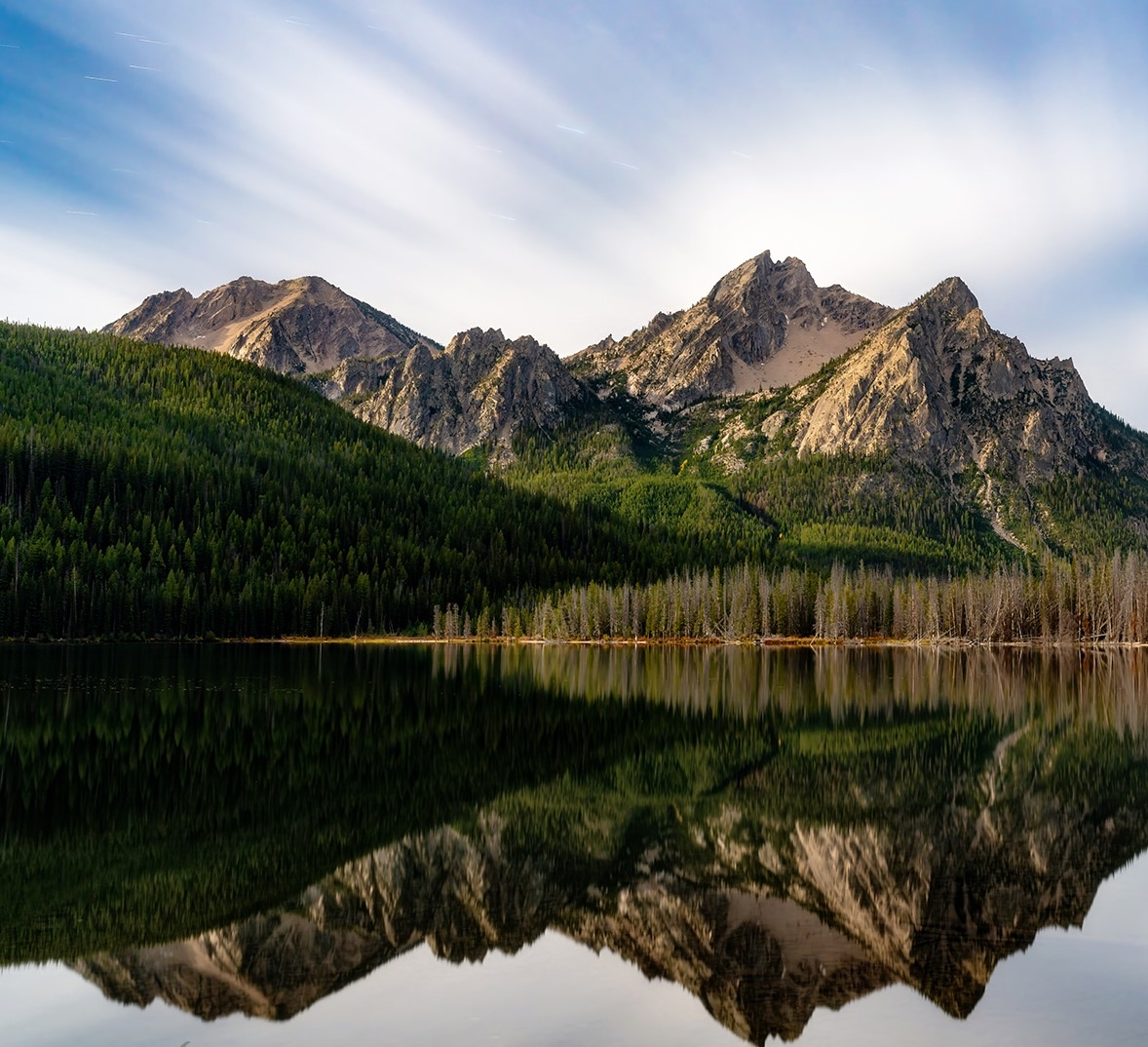
Mystery Mountain (left) and McGowan Peak (right) illuminated by moonlight and reflected in Stanley Lake

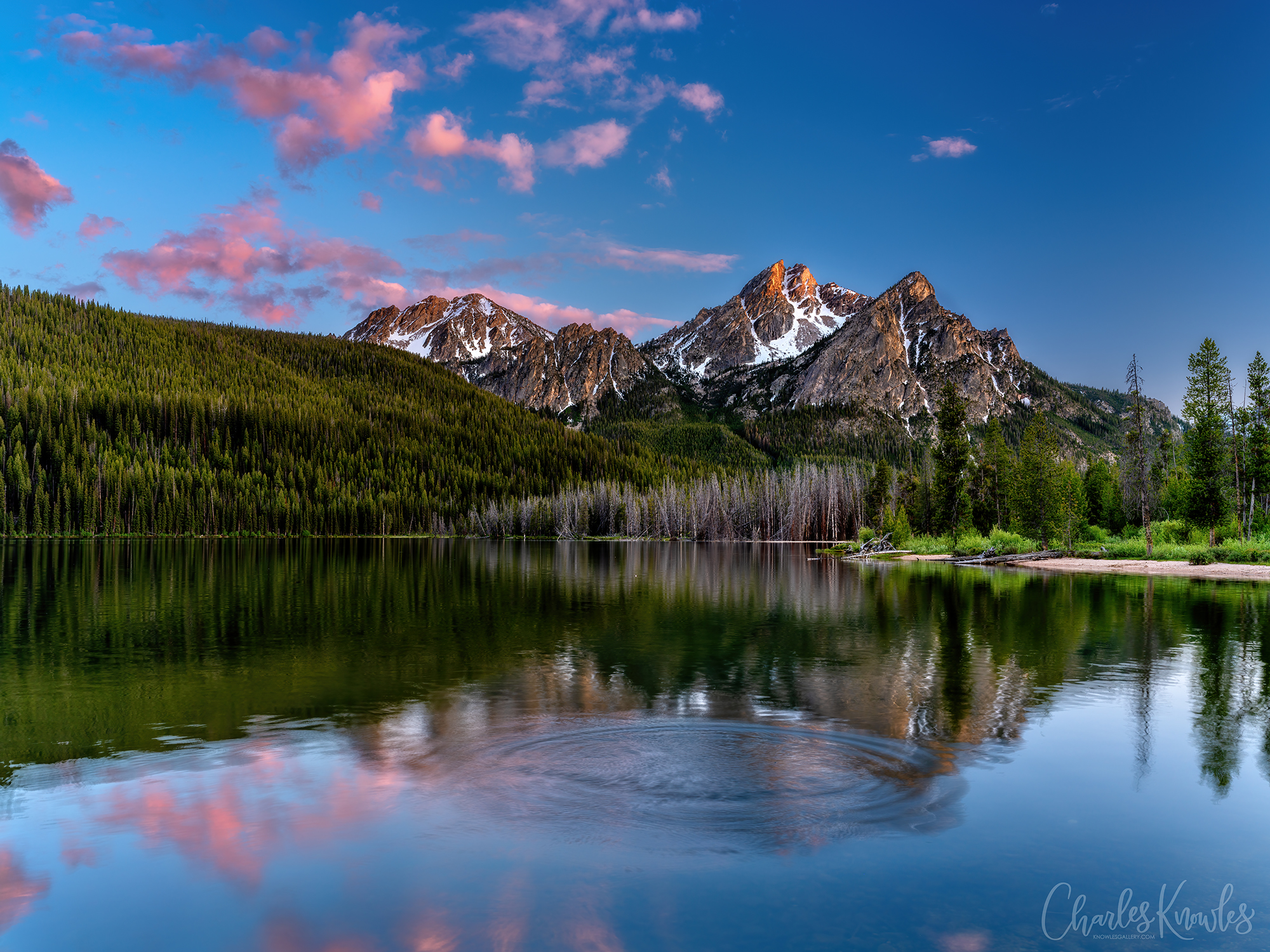
Mystery Mountain (left) and McGowan Peak (right) seen from Stanley Lake

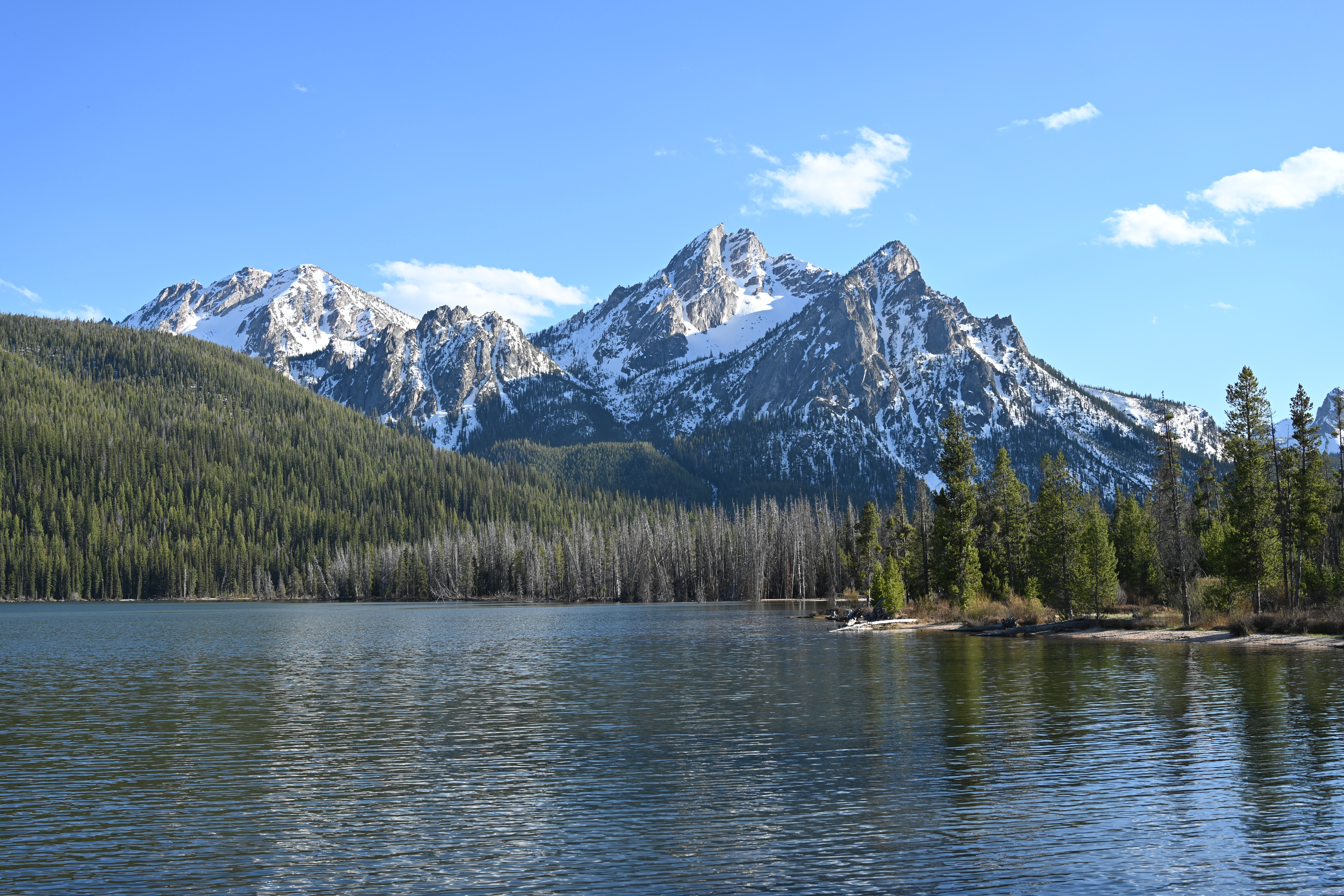
Mystery Mountain (left) and McGowan Peak (right) seen from Stanley Lake
