= Mount Regan (Idaho) =

Mountain in the state of Idaho

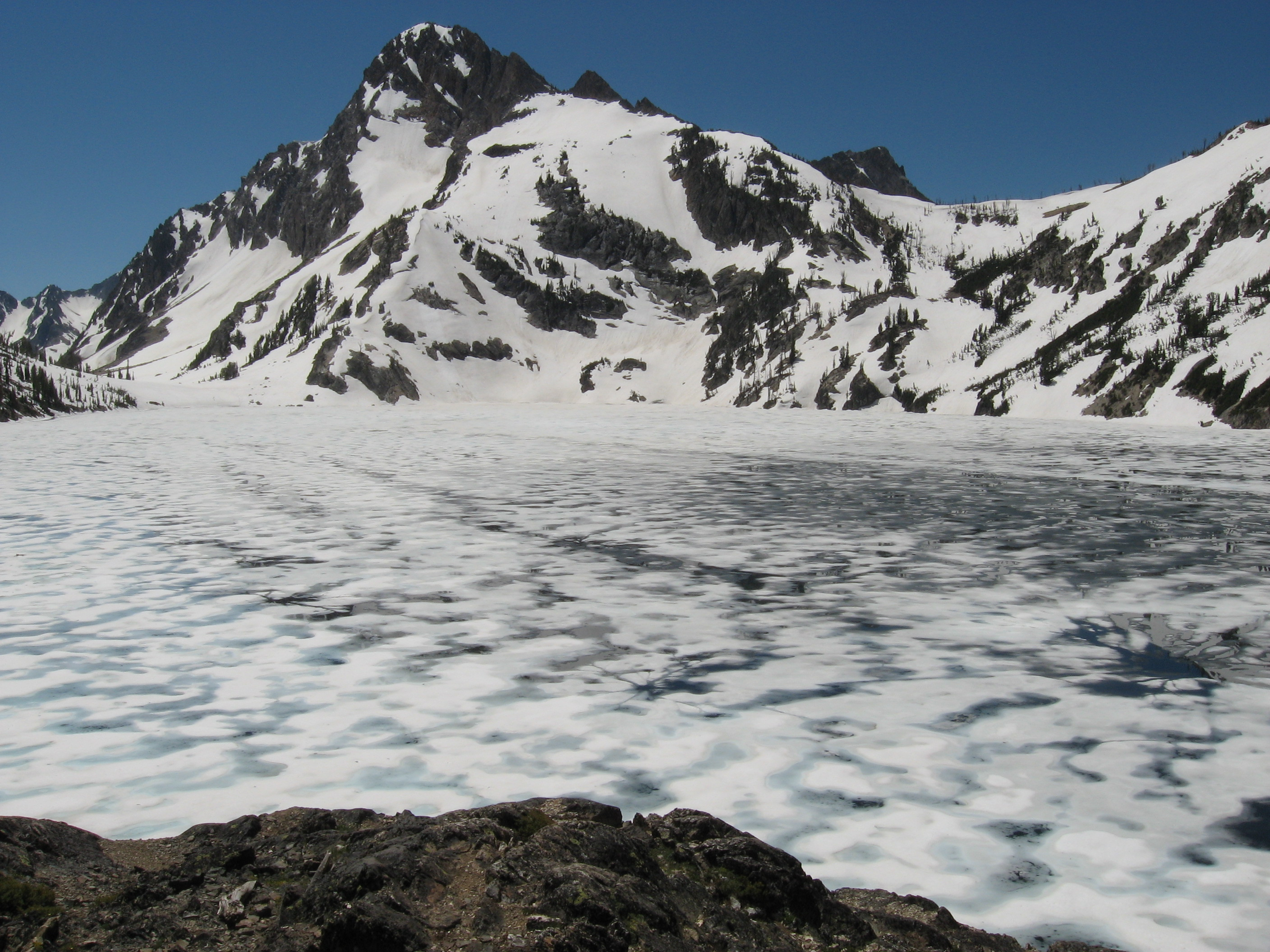
- Mount Regan and Sawtooth Lake

Highest point
- Elevation: 10,190 ft (3,110 m)
- Prominence: 1,710 ft (520 m)
- Parent peak: Merritt Peak
- Coordinates: 44°09′36″N 115°03′40″W

Geography
- Location within Idaho
- Location: Boise and Custer counties, Idaho, U.S.
- Parent range: Sawtooth Range
- Topo map: USGS Stanley Lake

Climbing
- Easiest route: class 3-4

Mount Regan, rises 10,190 feet (3,110 m) above sea level, and is a peak in the Sawtooth Range of Idaho. The peak is located in the Sawtooth Wilderness of Sawtooth National Recreation Area on the border of Boise and Custer counties. The peak is located 1.9 mi (3.1 km) west of Merritt Peak, its line parent. The peak is named after Timothy Regan, a pioneer who lived in Silver City, and then Boise. Mount Regan is located at the southern end of Sawtooth Lake. The Trailer Lakes and Regan Lake are located northwest of the peak, and the Trail Creek Lakes are west of the peak.
