= Alpine Peak (Idaho) =

Mountain in Idaho, United States

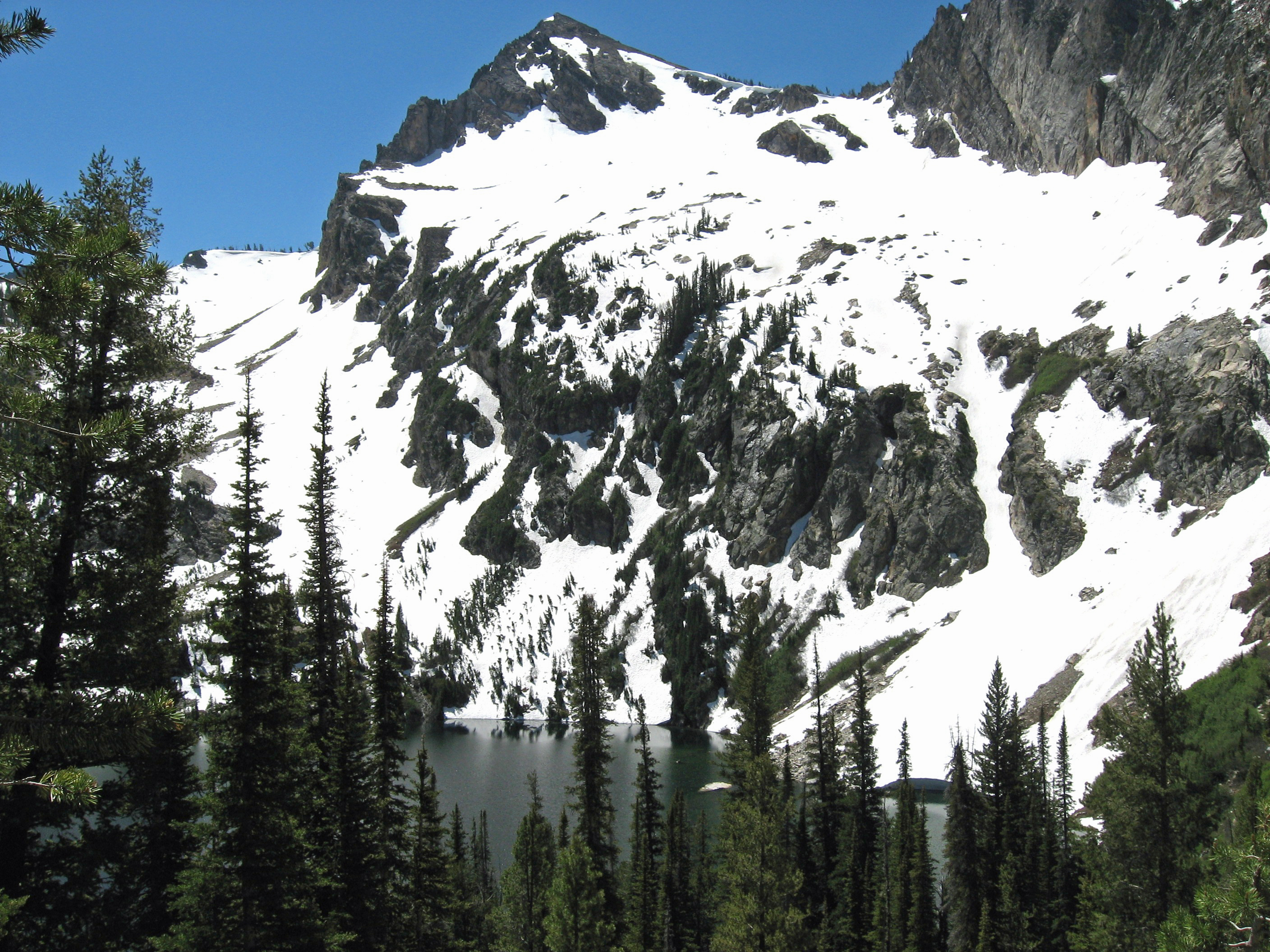
- Alpine Peak and Alpine Lake

Highest point
- Elevation: 9,861 ft (3,006 m)
- Prominence: 741 ft (226 m)
- Parent peak: Mount Regan
- Coordinates: 44°10′18″N 115°02′58″W

Geography
- Location within Idaho
- Location: Custer County, Idaho, U.S.
- Parent range: Sawtooth Range
- Topo map: USGS Stanley Lake

Climbing
- Easiest route: Simple scrambling, class 2

Alpine Peak, at 9,861 feet (3,006 m) above sea level is a peak in the Sawtooth Range of Idaho. The peak is located in the Sawtooth Wilderness of Sawtooth National Recreation Area in Custer County. The peak is located 1 mi (1.6 km) northeast of Mount Regan, its line parent. Alpine Peak is south of Alpine Lake and east of Sawtooth Lake.
