= Merritt Peak =

Merritt Peak can refer to the following mountains in the United States:

- Merritt Peak (Idaho), in Custer County
- Merritt Peak (South Dakota), a mountain in Pennigton County, South Dakota

== See also ==
- Mount Merritt, Montana
