= Mystery Mountain =

Mystery Mountain may refer to:

- Mystery Mountain (serial), a 1934 Western film serial
- Mystery Mountain (Idaho), a mountain in the Sawtooth Range
- JumpStart Adventures 3rd Grade: Mystery Mountain, a 1996 educational computer game created by Knowledge Adventure
- "Mystery Mountain", a song from the band Journey's self-titled debut album Journey
