= Alpine Peak =

Alpine Peak may refer to:

- A peak in the Alps
- Alpine Peak (Idaho)
