= Merritt Peak (Idaho) =

Mountain in Idaho, United States

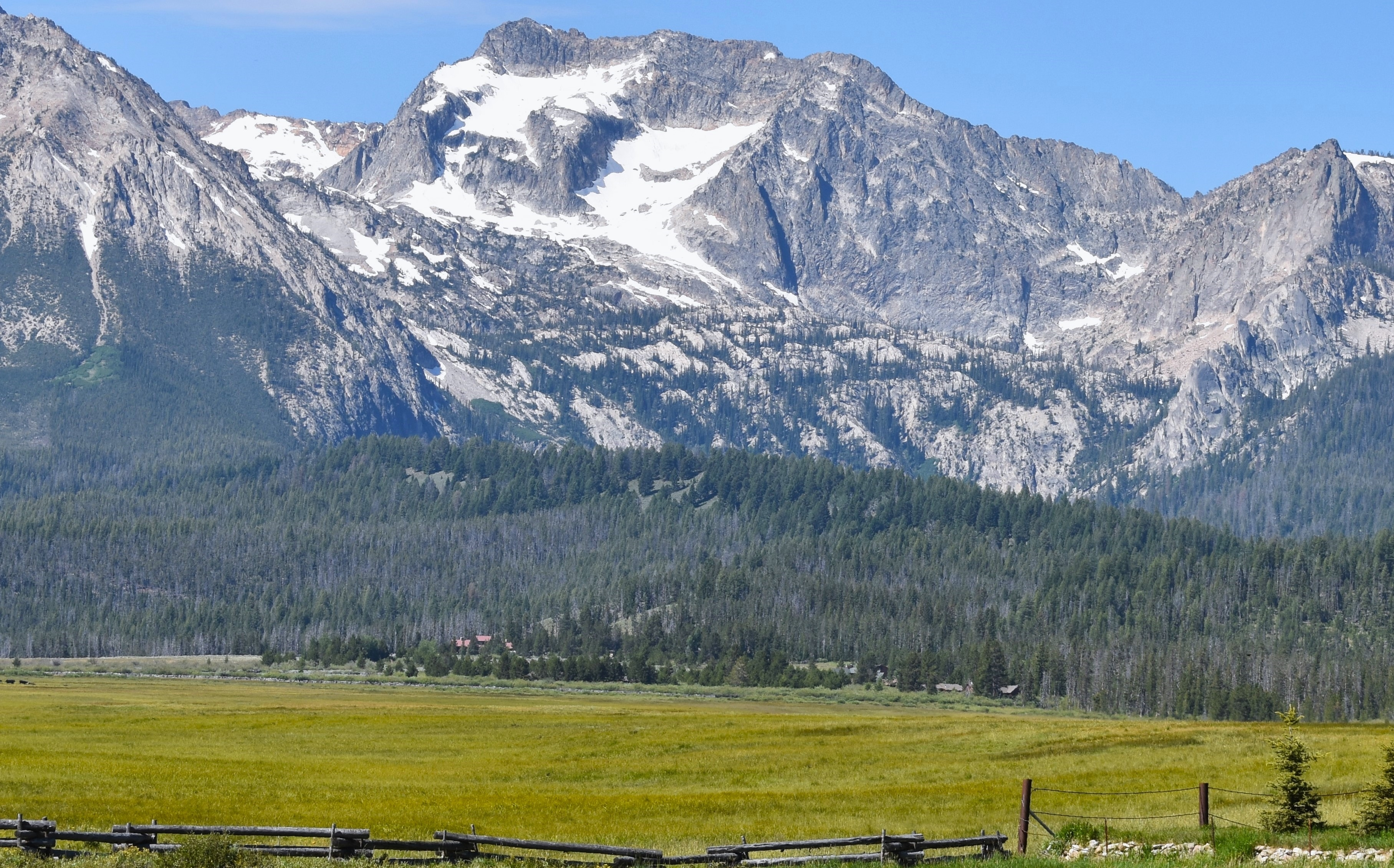
- Northeast aspect

Highest point
- Elevation: 10,312 ft (3,143 m)
- Prominence: 432 ft (132 m)
- Parent peak: Williams Peak
- Coordinates: 44°09′41″N 115°01′24″W

Geography
- Location within Idaho
- Location: Custer County, Idaho, U.S.
- Parent range: Sawtooth Range
- Topo map: USGS Stanley Lake

Climbing
- Easiest route: Simple Climbing, class 4

Merritt Peak, at 10,312 feet (3,143 m) above sea level is a peak in the Sawtooth Range of Idaho. The peak is located in the Sawtooth Wilderness of Sawtooth National Recreation Area in Custer County. The peak is located 1.08 mi (1.74 km) northwest of Williams Peak, its line parent. It is south-southwest of Goat Lake

== See also ==
- List of peaks of the Sawtooth Range (Idaho)
- List of mountains of Idaho
- List of mountain peaks of Idaho
- List of mountain ranges in Idaho

== Gallery ==
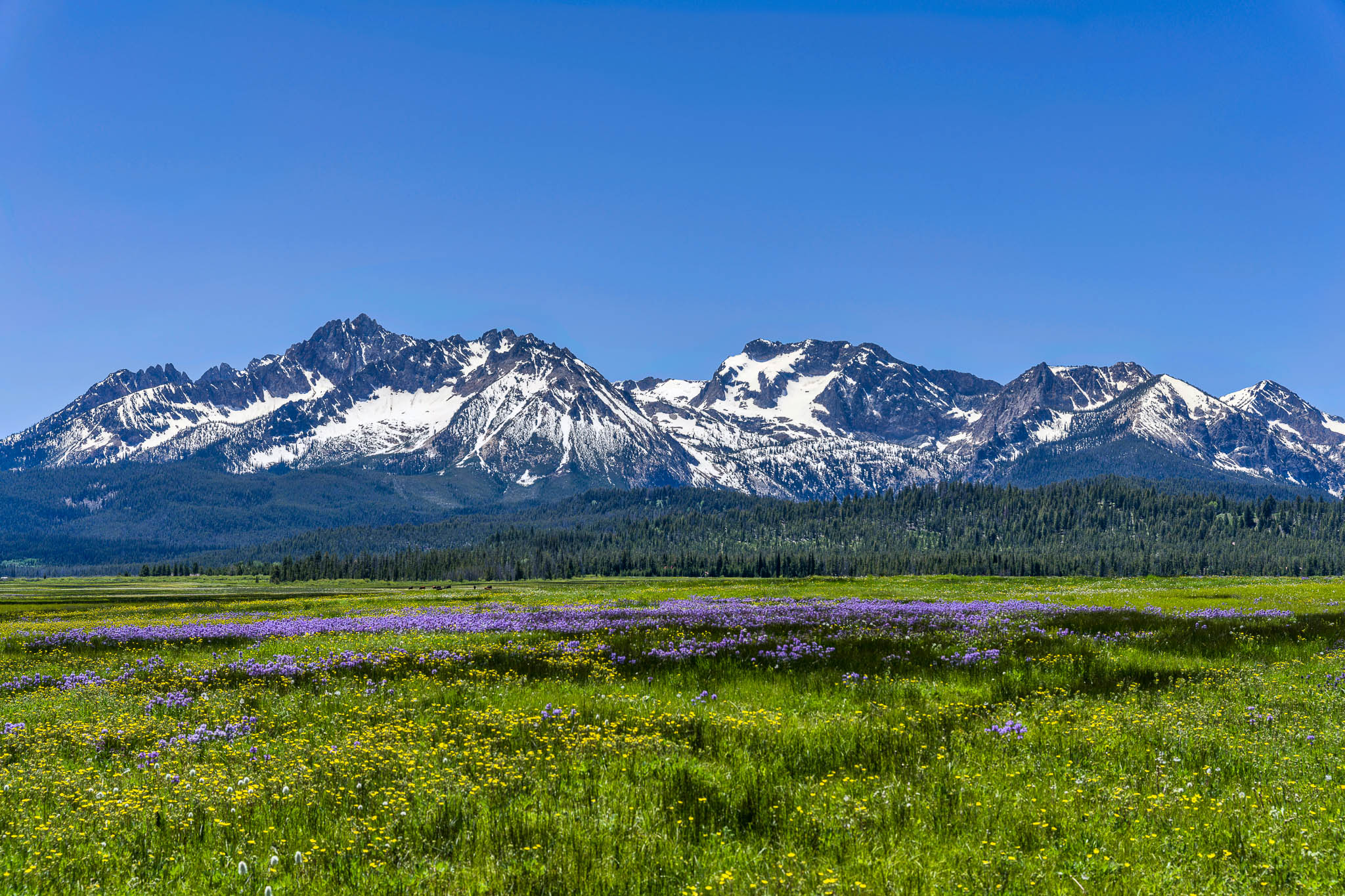
Williams Peak (left) and Merritt Peak (right of center)

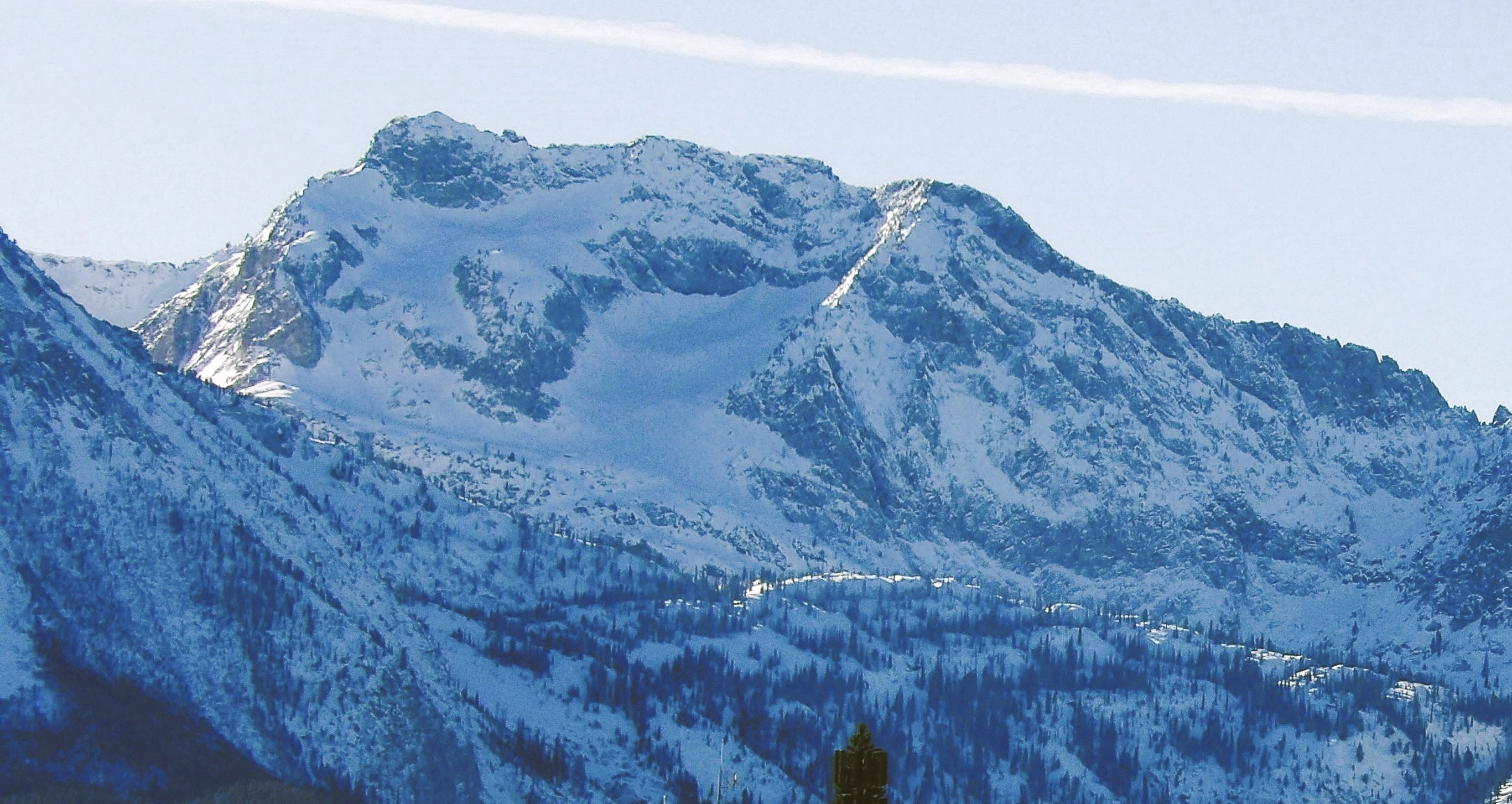
Merritt Peak from Stanley, Idaho

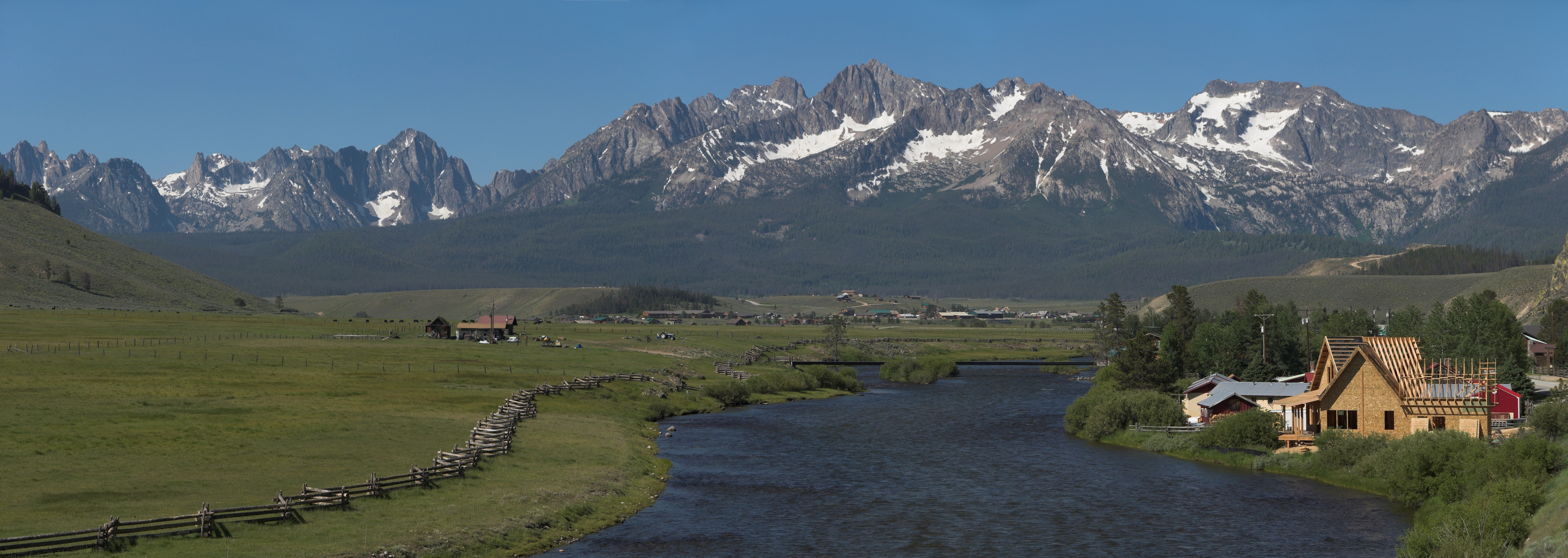
Merritt Peak (furthest right)

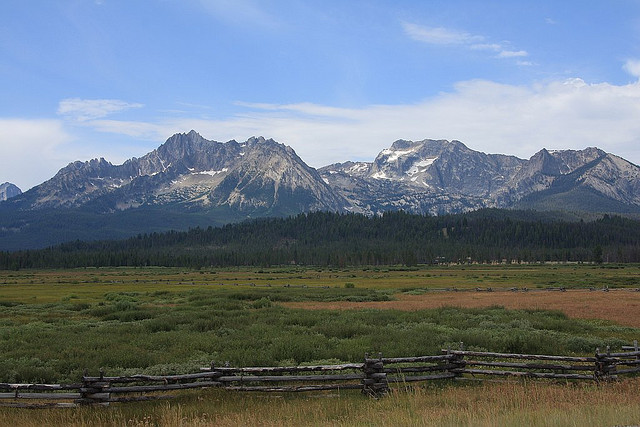
Williams Peak (left) and Merritt Peak (right)

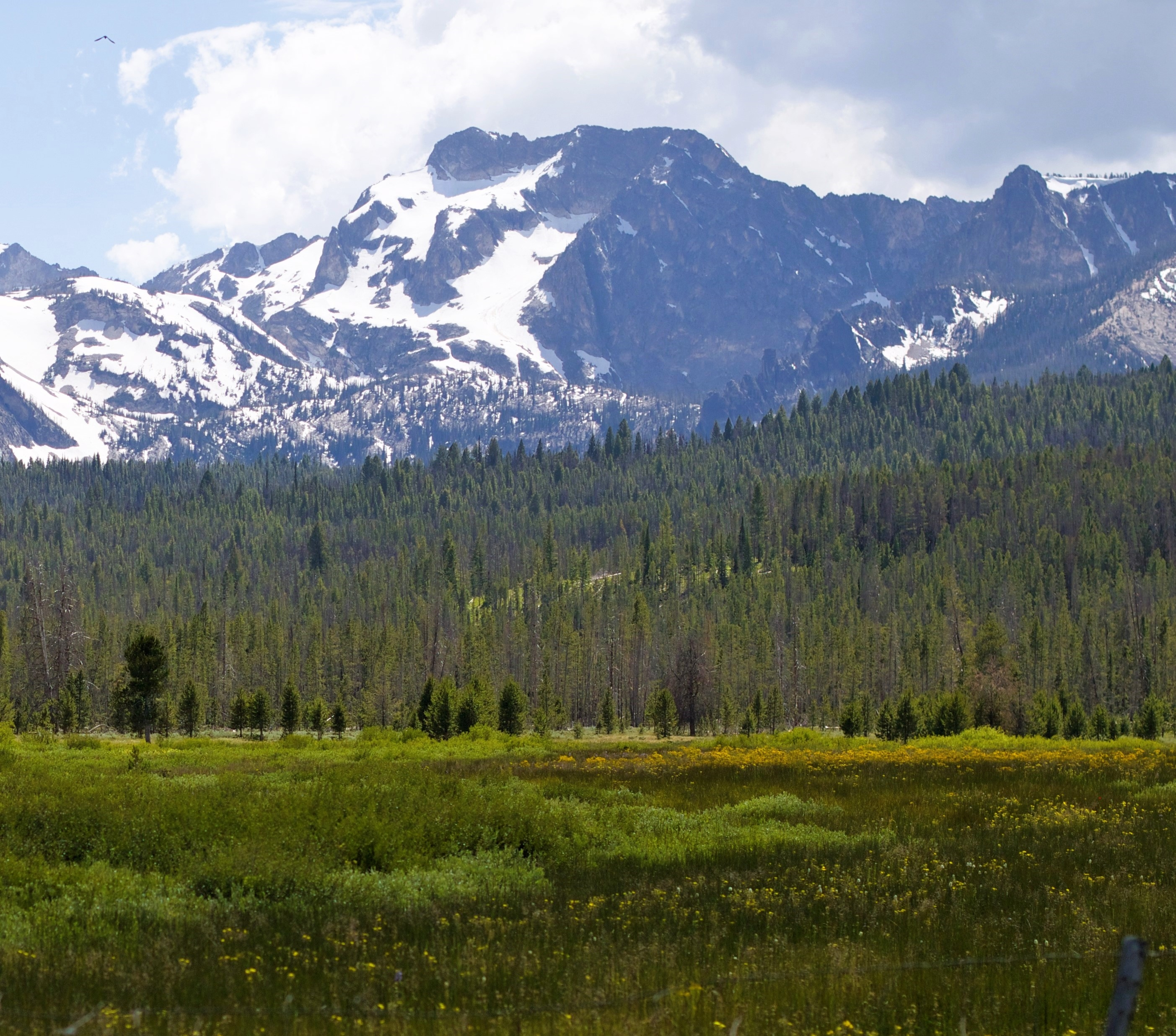
Northeast aspect
