= Williams Peak (Custer County, Idaho) =

Mountain in the Sawtooth Range in the US state of Idaho

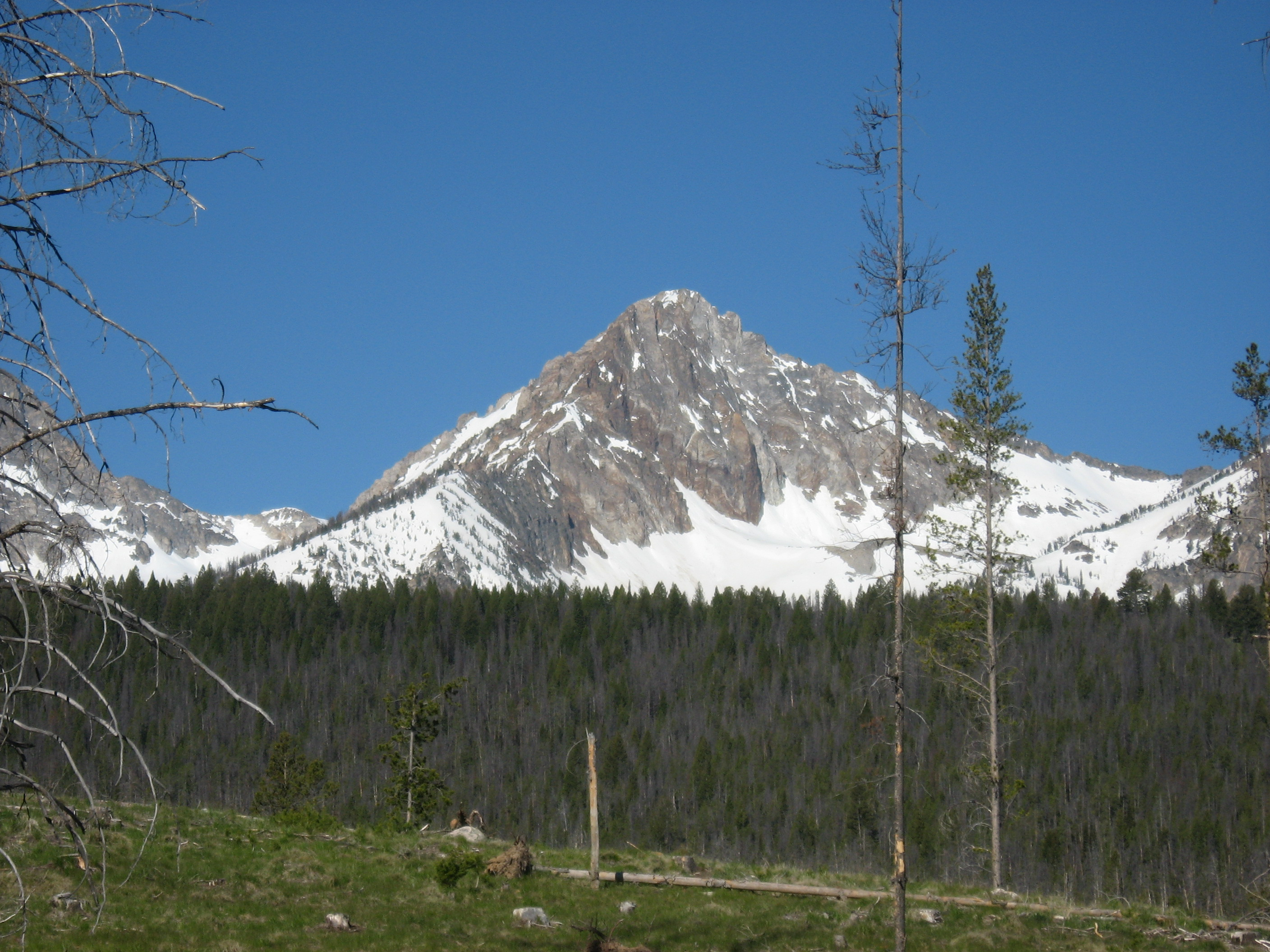
- Williams Peak

Highest point
- Elevation: 10,635 ft (3,242 m)
- Prominence: 837 ft (255 m)
- Parent peak: Thompson Peak
- Coordinates: 44°09′08.66″N 115°00′21.31″W

Geography
- Location within Idaho
- Location: Custer County, Idaho, U.S.
- Parent range: Sawtooth Range
- Topo map: USGS Stanley Lake

Climbing
- First ascent: 1934
- Easiest route: Scramble – Class 3

Williams Peak, at 10,636 feet (3,242 m) high is the 6th highest peak in the Sawtooth Mountains of Idaho and is located within the Sawtooth Wilderness portion of the Sawtooth National Recreation Area. The peak lies 0.75 mi (1,210 m) north-northeast of Thompson Peak, the highest peak in the range.

The town of Stanley, Idaho is 5.5 miles (8.9 km) northeast of the peak. Views of the peak may be accessed from the scenic Idaho State Highway 75, and on hiking trails from Redfish Lake and throughout the Sawtooth and White Cloud Mountains.

== History ==
Williams Peak is named for pioneer Dave Williams, who was a part of the first ascent team in 1934 along with Robert and Miriam Underhill. Williams also owned the property of what is now the Idaho Rocky Mountain Ranch, which looks toward the peak.

== Routes ==
Various routes are available for hikers and climbers as the mountain's southern slopes and ridgelines offer challenging and exciting scrambling, while the steep North Face offers the peak's classic alpine climb with over 1,100 feet (340 m) or 9 pitches of steep climbing.

1) The June/ North Couloir (III 5.7) – This prominent steep couloir cuts up the northeast face to a notch just below the summit. It's fairly easy access from the Alpine Way Trail near Marshall Lake. The couloir often has ice, rock, and snow and is blocked by a large cornice in the winter near the top. The first ascent came in 1986 by Kirk Bachman and B. Franklin.

Rope up at the base of the couloir and expect highly variable conditions on snow and ice. The route is straightforward. At the top of the couloir, follow the ridge to the west and then the south to the summit. It's only 400 feet (120 m) from the top of the couloir to the summit proper. The easiest descent is to utilize the south facing routes to get back to the trail.

2) Southeast Slopes (Class 3)—This is a route on the mountain with access from the Alpine Way Trail. Winter time offers snow climbing and ski descents here.

3) East Ridge (Class 4)—A more challenging route involves up and down scrambling on the prominent southeast ridge above the Southeast Slopes route. There are sections of extreme exposure and steep, loose gullies to cross over. MountaingGoats were encountered on this route.

4) Southwest Couloir (Class 3)—This route is readily accessible from the Thompson/Williams Saddle (Thompson and Williams can be done together) or the Lake 8865 area.

== Images ==
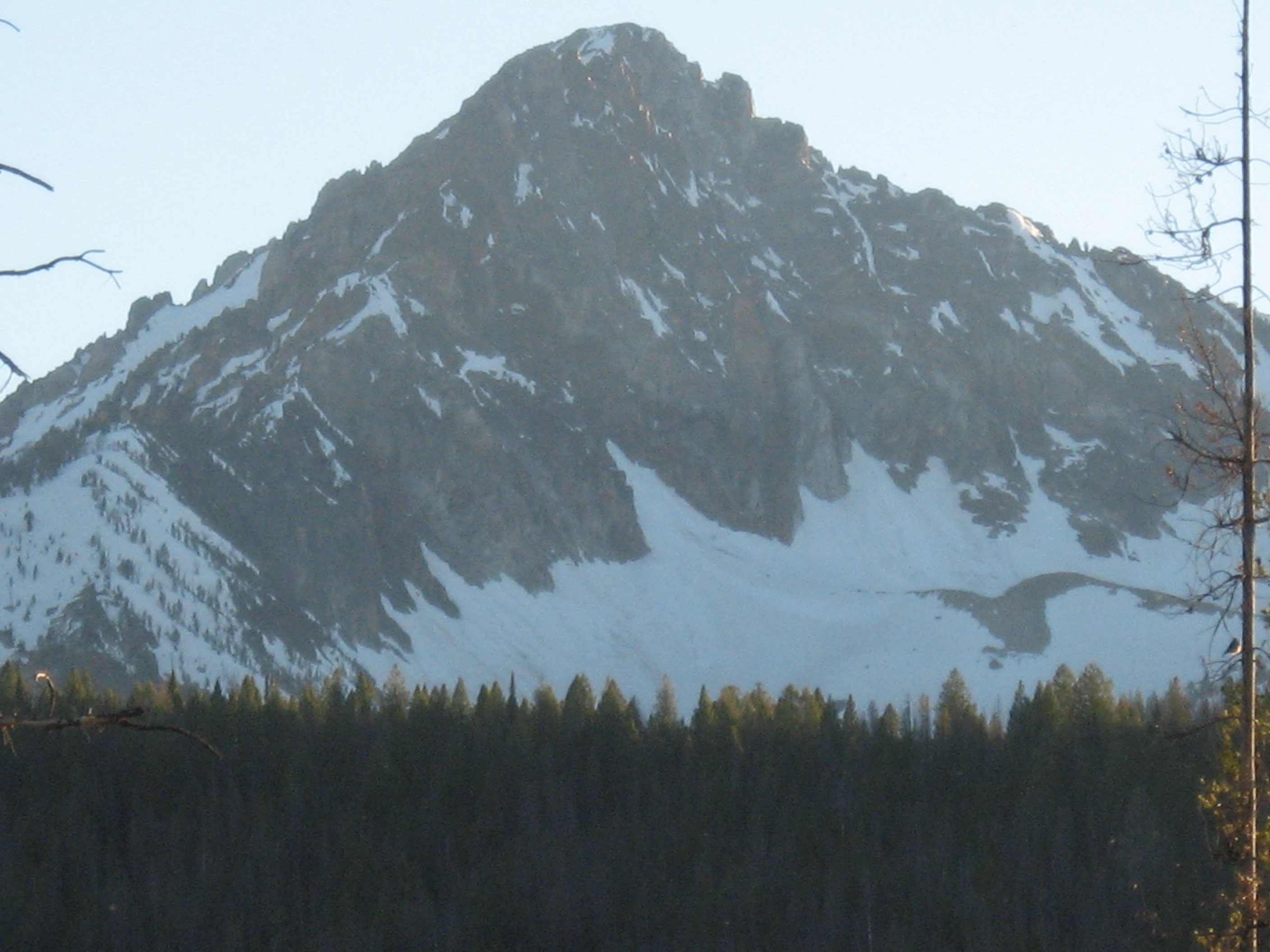
Williams Peak from near Stanley Ranger Station

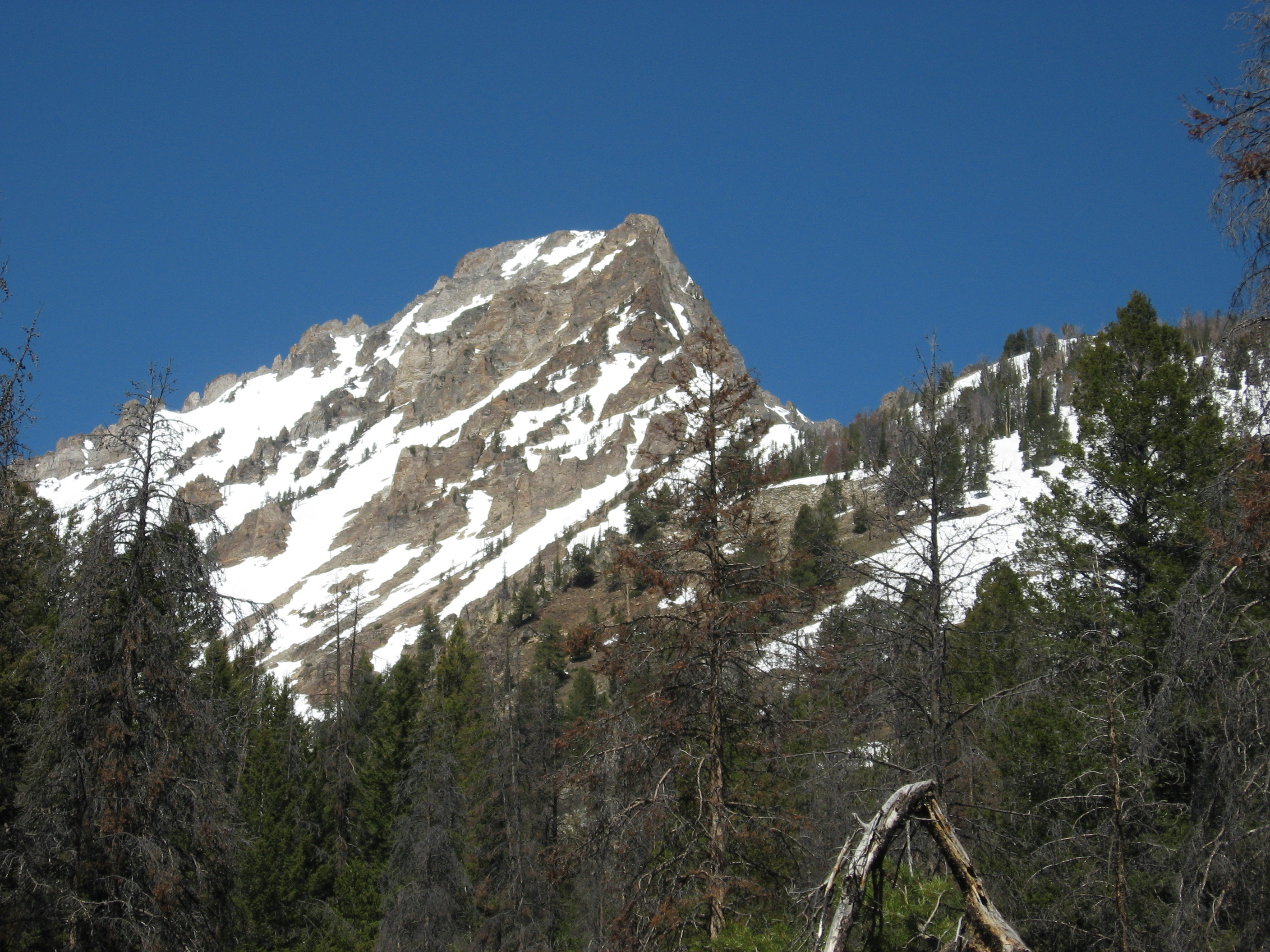
Williams Peak from Alpine Way Trail

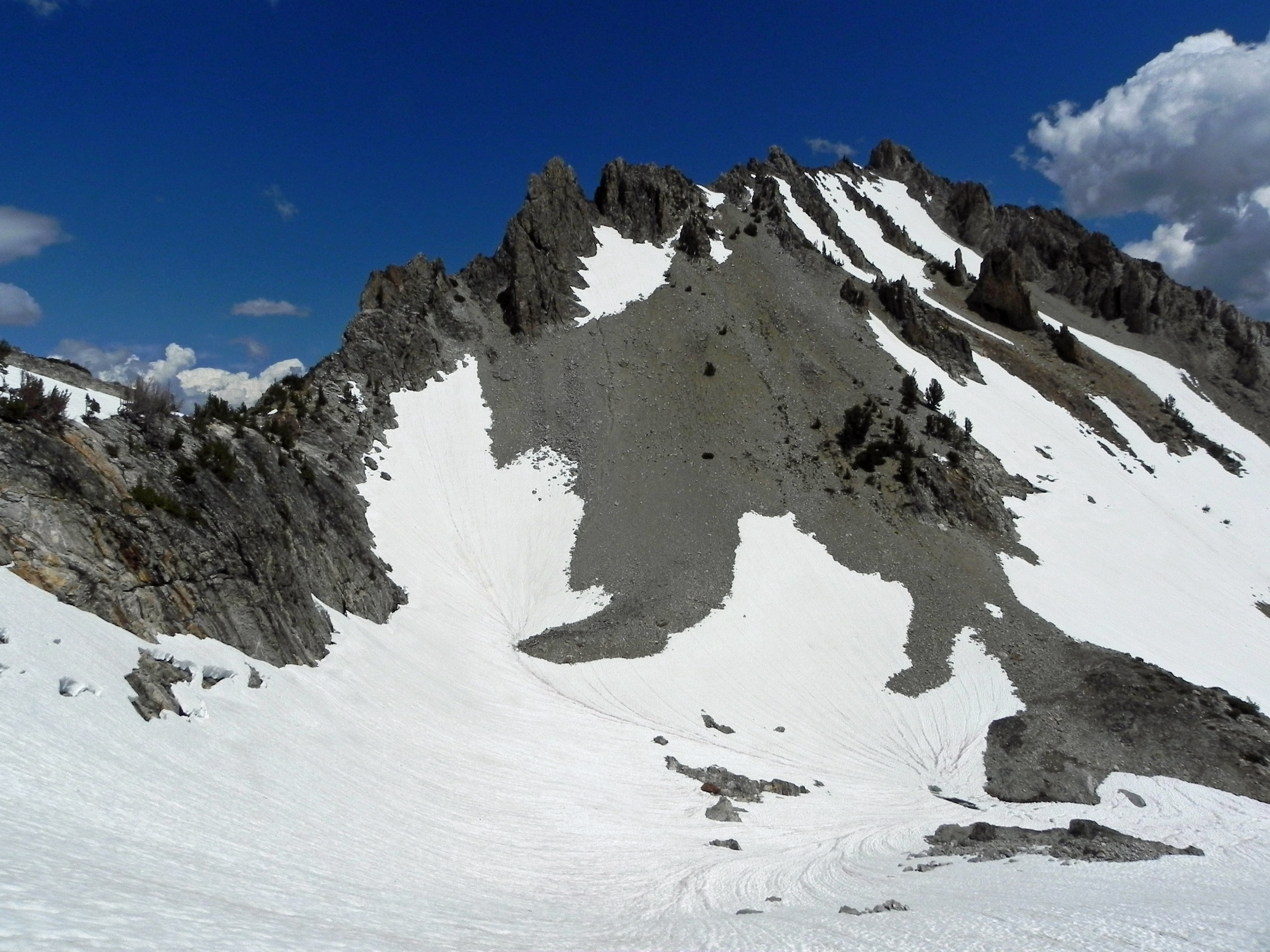
Williams Peak

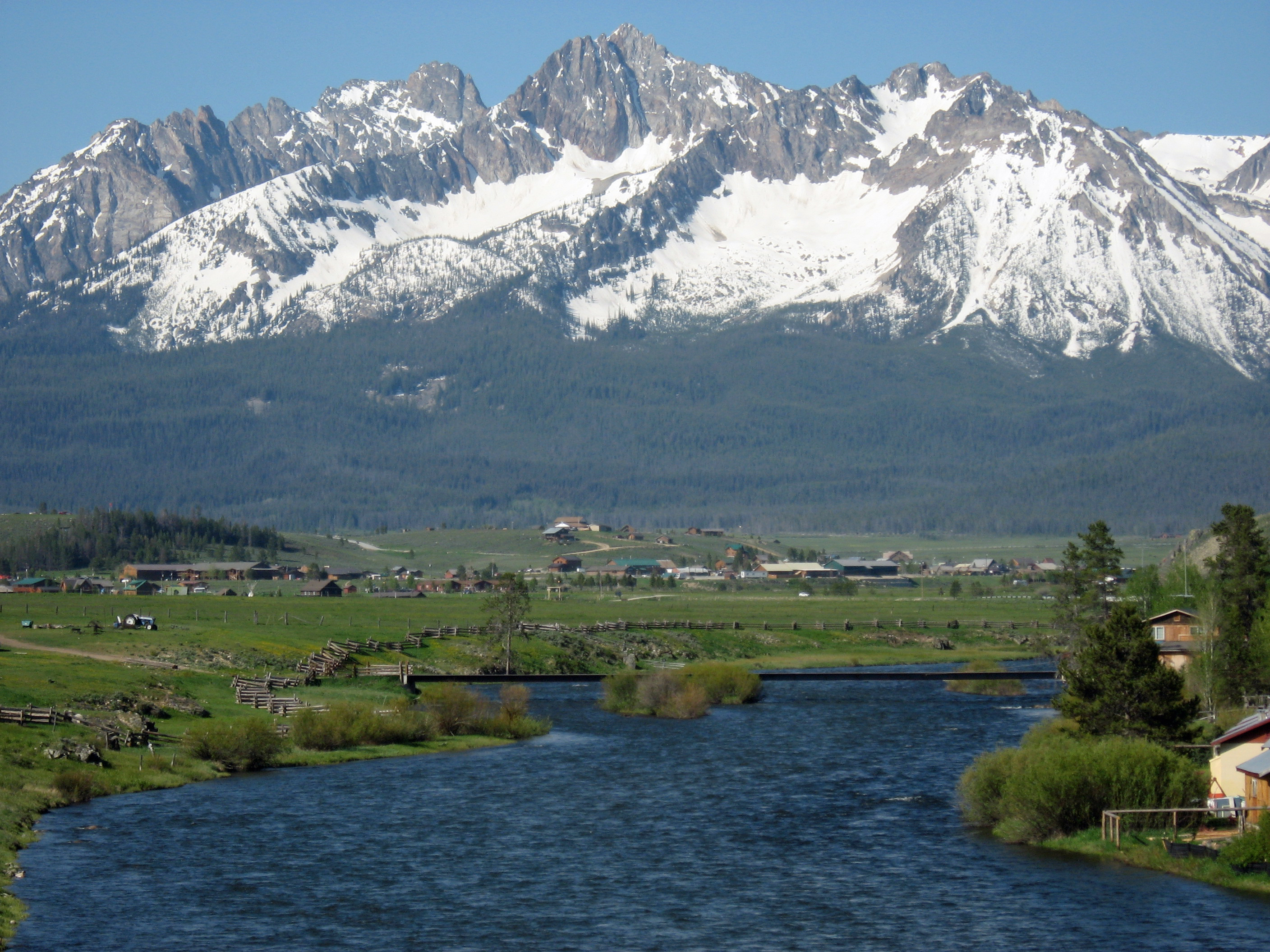
Northeast aspect

== See also ==
- List of peaks of the Sawtooth Range (Idaho)
- List of mountains of Idaho
- List of mountain peaks of Idaho
- List of mountain ranges in Idaho
