= Alpine Lake (Northern Sawtooth Wilderness) =

Alpine lake in the state of Idaho

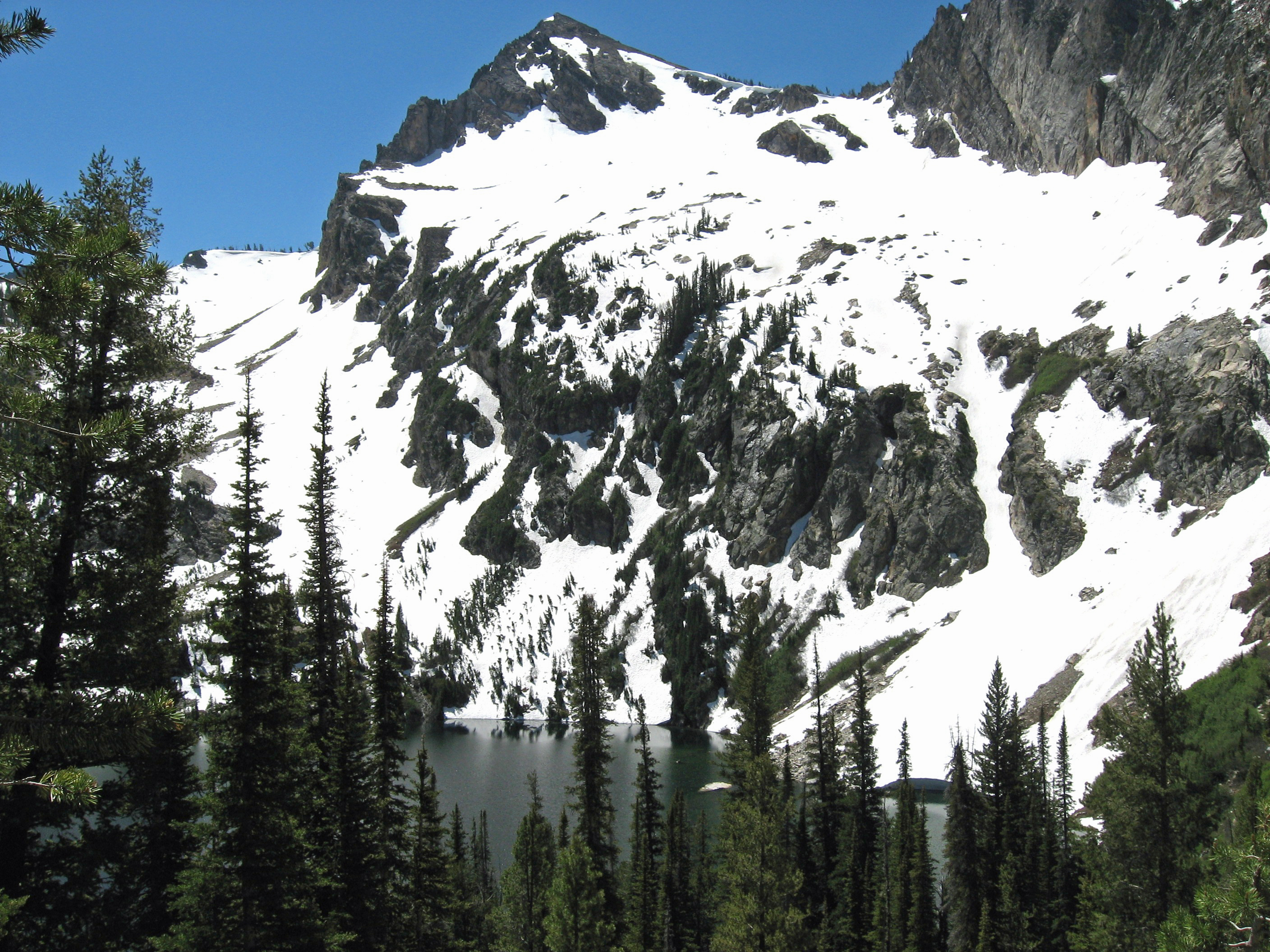
- Alpine Lake and Alpine Peak

- Location within Idaho Location within the United States
- Location: Custer County, Idaho
- Coordinates: 44.1813492°N 115.0535605°W
- Type: Glacial
- Primary outflows: Iron Creek to Salmon River
- Basin countries: United States
- Max. length: 0.30 mi (0.48 km)
- Max. width: 0.18 mi (0.29 km)
- Surface elevation: 7,828 ft (2,386 m)

Alpine Lake is an alpine lake in Custer County, Idaho, United States, located high in the Sawtooth Mountains in the Sawtooth National Recreation Area. The lake is approximately 6.3 mi (10.1 km) southwest of Stanley. A trail from the Iron Creek trailhead and campground leads approximately 5 miles (8.0 km) to Sawtooth Lake. The Iron Creek trailhead can be accessed from State Highway 21 via Sawtooth National Forest road 619. There is another lake with the name Alpine Lake in the central part of the Sawtooth Wilderness.

With a surface elevation of 7,828 feet (2,386 m) above sea level, Alpine Lake can remain frozen into early summer. At the south end of Alpine Lake is Alpine Peak at 9,861 feet (3,006 m) above sea level. Less than a half mile southwest of Alpine Lake is Sawtooth Lake, one of the most popular destinations in the Sawtooth National Recreation Area. Alpine Lake is in the Sawtooth Wilderness and wilderness permit can be obtained at trailheads.

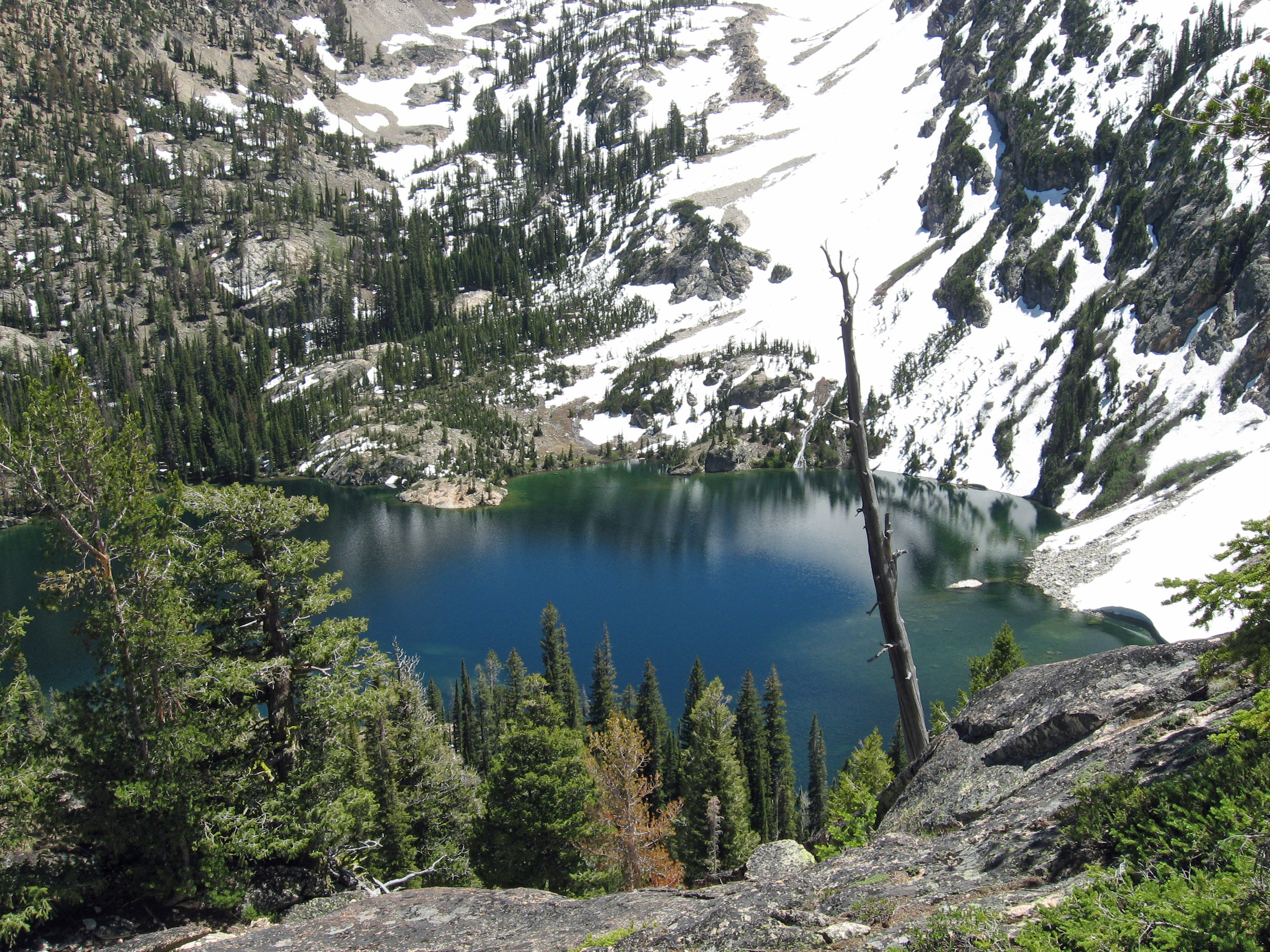
Alpine Lake

== See also ==
- List of lakes of the Sawtooth Mountains (Idaho)
- Sawtooth National Forest
- Sawtooth National Recreation Area
- Sawtooth Range (Idaho)
