= Trail Creek Lakes =

Alpine lakes in the state of Idaho

The Trail Creek Lakes are a series of five small alpine glacial lakes in Boise County, Idaho, United States, located in the Sawtooth Mountains in the Sawtooth National Recreation Area. The lakes are on Trail Creek, which is a tributary of the South Fork Payette River. The lakes can be accessed from Sawtooth National Forest trail 453.

The Trail Creek Lakes are in the Sawtooth Wilderness, and a wilderness permit can be obtained at a registration box at trailheads or wilderness boundaries. Mount Regan at 10,190 ft (3,110 m) is to the east of the lakes.

Trail Creek Lakes
Lake	Elevation	Max. length	Max. width	Location
Trail Creek Lake 1	2,516 m (8,255 ft)	207 m (679 ft)	161 m (528 ft)	44.160731°N 115.080808°W
Trail Creek Lake 2	2,517 m (8,258 ft)	062 m (203 ft)	033 m (108 ft)	44.159336°N 115.080828°W
Trail Creek Lake 3	2,510 m (8,230 ft)	240 m (790 ft)	145 m (476 ft)	44.157794°N 115.081958°W
Trail Creek Lake 4	2,513 m (8,245 ft)	046 m (151 ft)	033 m (108 ft)	44.160267°N 115.083331°W
Trail Creek Lake 5	2,435 m (7,989 ft)	274 m (899 ft)	158 m (518 ft)	44.158425°N 115.087039°W

== See also ==
- List of lakes of the Sawtooth Mountains (Idaho)
- Sawtooth National Forest
- Sawtooth National Recreation Area
- Sawtooth Range (Idaho)
