= Regan Lake =

Alpine lake in the state of Idaho

- Location within Idaho Location within the United States
- Location: Boise County, Idaho
- Coordinates: 44°09′57″N 115°04′37″W
- Type: Glacial
- Primary inflows: Trail Creek
- Primary outflows: Trail Creek to South Fork Payette River
- Basin countries: United States
- Max. length: 0.08 mi (0.13 km)
- Max. width: 0.08 mi (0.13 km)
- Surface elevation: 8,475 ft (2,583 m)

Regan Lake is a small alpine lake in Boise County, Idaho, United States, located in the Sawtooth Mountains in the Sawtooth National Recreation Area. The lake is most easily accessed from Sawtooth National Forest trail 453.

Regan Lake is in the Sawtooth Wilderness, and a wilderness permit can be obtained at a registration box at trailheads or wilderness boundaries. The Trailer Lakes are upstream of Regan Lake, and Mount Regan at 10,190 ft (3,110 m) is to the east of the lake.

== See also ==
- List of lakes of the Sawtooth Mountains (Idaho)
- Sawtooth National Forest
- Sawtooth National Recreation Area
- Sawtooth Range (Idaho)
