= Idaho Rocky Mountain Ranch =

The Idaho Rocky Mountain Ranch
- Interactive map of The Idaho Rocky Mountain Ranch
- Location: Stanley, Idaho, Custer County, Idaho, United States
- Elevation: 6,638 feet (2,023 m)
- Idaho Rocky Mountain Club
- U.S. National Register of Historic Places
- U.S. Historic district
- Location within Idaho Location within the United States
- Nearest city: Stanley, Idaho
- Coordinates: 44°5′46″N 114°50′54″W
- Area: 878 acres (355 ha)
- Built: 1930
- Architect: Ellis Bjorling
- Architectural style: Log Cabin
- NRHP reference No.: 94001451
- Added to NRHP: December 9, 1994

The Idaho Rocky Mountain Ranch is a guest ranch located in the Sawtooth National Recreation Area of the U.S. state of Idaho, between the Sawtooth and White Cloud Mountain ranges. The 900-acre (3.6 km^{2}) ranch property is located in Custer County, sixty miles north of the Ketchum and Sun Valley resort area and 9 miles (14 km) south of Stanley, Idaho, which had a population of 100 at the 2000 census.

== History ==
The Ranch property was originally part of Stanley Basin pioneer and Swiss guide Dave Williams’ homestead. Williams came to the Sawtooth Valley and opened his own dairy and butcher shop, delivered the mail up and over the 9,000 ft (2,700 m). Galena Summit, and worked the Vienna Mine south of Stanley near the Smiley Lodge. Nearby Williams Peak (Idaho) is named after the pioneer, who was a part of the first ascent team in 1934.

In 1929 the property was acquired by Winston Paul, a New York Frigidaire distributor, who began building the Idaho Rocky Mountain Club to serve as a private hunting club.

Ranch Construction began in the fall of 1929 with the snaking of logs up Williams and Gold Creek, to the Big Meadow chosen as the Lodge site. A crew of 60 men, among them a blacksmith and stonemason, camped on the Ranch property for 3 months until they were forced to leave by severe winter weather. The crew returned in the spring of 1930 to complete construction, and the Idaho Rocky Mountain Club opened that summer as an invitation-only guest facility. A hydroelectric plant, the log structure still standing at the willowed bend in the pond, generated power for the IRMC, providing the first electricity in the Sawtooth Valley. The construction project proved a welcome source of income for the men during the years of the Great Depression.

Austrian clothing manufacturer Josef Lanz purchased the IRMC from Paul, but the guest ranch was forced to close at the outbreak of World War II.

In 1951, Edmund A. Bogert, an automobile dealer from Pocatello, Idaho, purchased the lodge and changed the name to the Idaho Rocky Mountain Ranch. Mr. Bogert began a program of leveling, fertilizing and planting, and earned the 1958 Custer County Grassman of the Year Award.

In 1977 Edmund's daughter Rozalys Smith began her proprietorship of the IRMR. The 54 year stewardship of the Smith family continued until February 2005 when a new family of preservationally concerned owners purchased the IRMR.

== National Register of Historic Places ==
In 1994, the Idaho Rocky Mountain Club was placed on the National Register of Historic Places as a historic district. Twelve buildings and two other structures at the club qualified as contributing properties. It is currently one of thirty-seven places listed on the Register in Custer County.
