= McGowan Peak =

Mountain in the state of Idaho

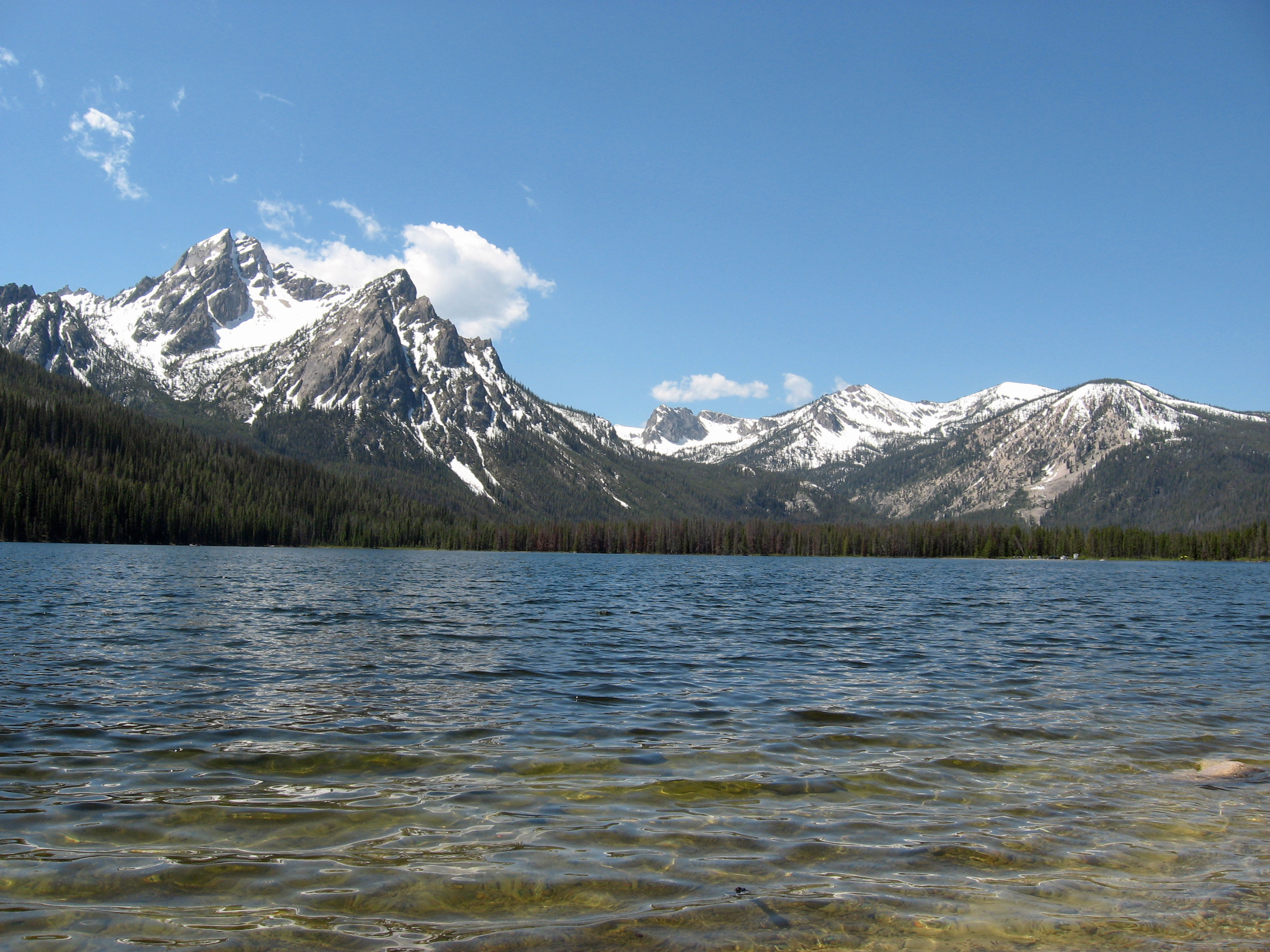
- McGowan Peak and Stanley Lake

Highest point
- Elevation: 9,860 ft (3,010 m)
- Prominence: 1,100 ft (340 m)
- Parent peak: Alpine Peak
- Coordinates: 44°12′48″N 115°04′51″W

Geography
- Location within Idaho
- Location: Custer County, Idaho, U.S.
- Parent range: Sawtooth Range
- Topo map: USGS Stanley Lake

Climbing
- Easiest route: Scrambling, class 3

McGowan Peak (variant name McGown Peak) is a peak in the Sawtooth Range of Idaho that is 9,860 feet (3,010 m) above sea level. The peak is located in the Sawtooth Wilderness of Sawtooth National Recreation Area in Custer County. The peak is located 3.25 mi (5.23 km) north-northwest of Alpine Peak, its line parent. McGowan Peak rises above the southwest end of Stanley Lake.
