= Trailer Lakes =

Alpine lakes in the state of Idaho

The Trailer Lakes are a series of three small alpine glacial lakes in Boise County, Idaho, United States, located in the Sawtooth Mountains in the Sawtooth National Recreation Area. The Trailer Lakes are in the Trail Creek watershed, which is a tributary of the South Fork Payette River. The lakes are most easily accessed from Sawtooth National Forest trail 453.

The Trailer Lakes are in the Sawtooth Wilderness, and a wilderness permit can be obtained at a registration box at trailheads or wilderness boundaries. Regan Lake is downstream of the Trailer Lakes, and Mount Regan at 10,190 ft (3,110 m) is to the southeast of the lakes.

Trailer Lakes
Lake	Elevation	Max. length	Max. width	Location
Lower Trailer Lake	2,606 m (8,550 ft)	094 m (308 ft)	030 m (98 ft)	44.1654°N 115.072894°W
Middle Trailer Lake	2,691 m (8,829 ft)	306 m (1,004 ft)	195 m (640 ft)	44.161792°N 115.068564°W
Upper Trailer Lake	2,705 m (8,875 ft)	129 m (423 ft)	045 m (148 ft)	44.161753°N 115.071611°W

== See also ==
- List of lakes of the Sawtooth Mountains (Idaho)
- Sawtooth National Forest
- Sawtooth National Recreation Area
- Sawtooth Range (Idaho)
