= Sawtooth Lake =

Lake in United States

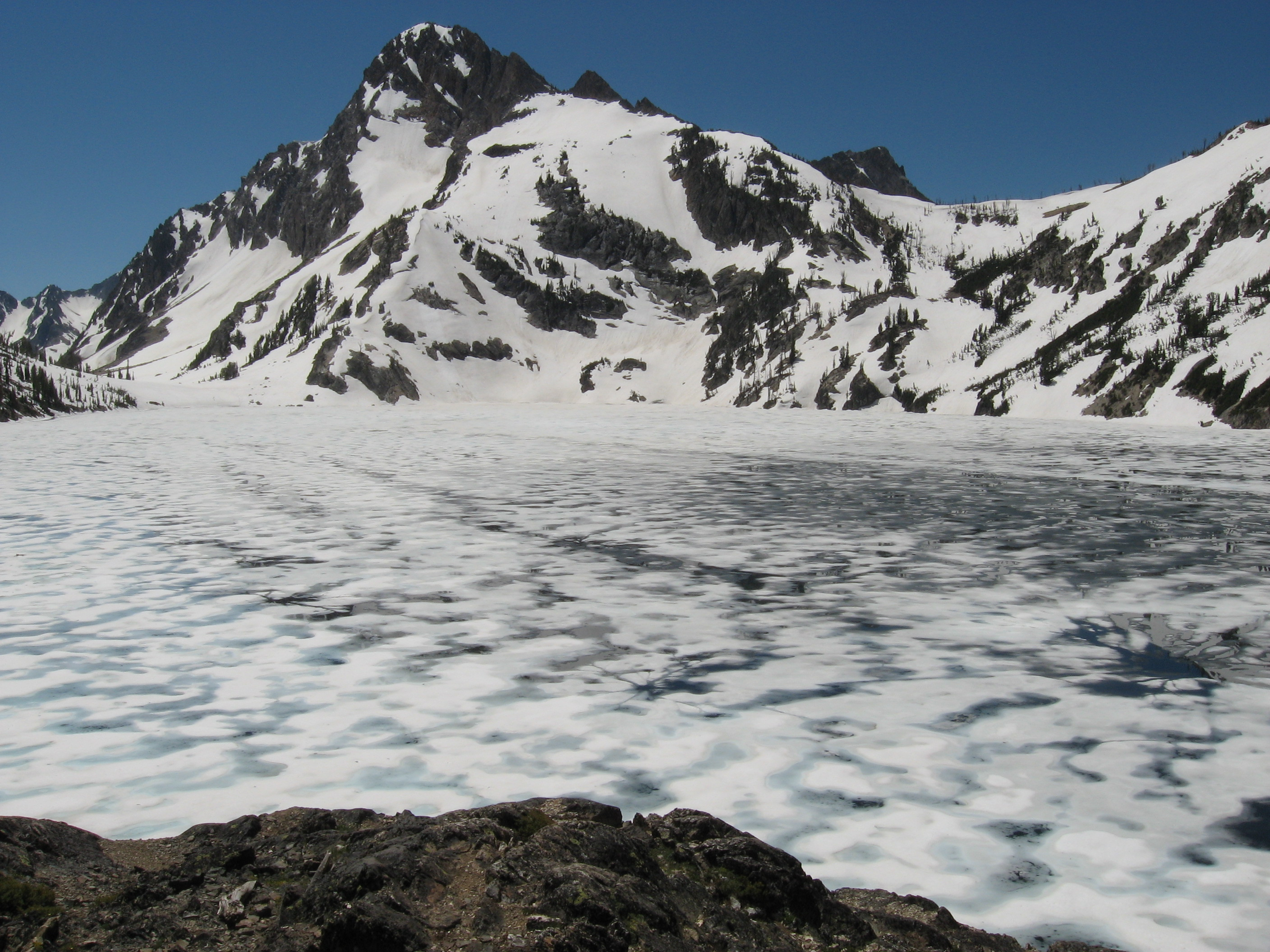
- Sawtooth Lake and Mount Regan

- Location within Idaho Location within the United States
- Location: Custer County, Idaho
- Coordinates: 44°10′20″N 115°03′49″W
- Type: Glacial
- Primary outflows: Iron Creek to Salmon River
- Basin countries: United States
- Max. length: 0.88 mi (1.42 km)
- Max. width: 0.42 mi (0.68 km)
- Surface elevation: 8,435 ft (2,571 m)

Sawtooth Lake is an alpine lake in Custer County, Idaho, United States, located high in the Sawtooth Mountains in the Sawtooth National Recreation Area. The lake is approximately 6.8 miles (10.9 km) southwest of Stanley. A trail from the Iron Creek trailhead and campground leads approximately 5 miles to Sawtooth Lake. The Iron Creek trailhead can be accessed from State Highway 21 via Sawtooth National Forest road 619.

With a surface elevation of 8,435 feet (2,571 m) above sea level, Sawtooth Lake often remains frozen into early summer. At the southern end of the lake is Mount Regan at 10,190 feet (3,110 m) in elevation.

Sawtooth Lake is in the Sawtooth Wilderness and wilderness permit can be obtained at trailheads. The hike to Sawtooth Lake from the Iron Creek trailhead is one of the most popular hikes in the Sawtooth National Recreation Area. This trail gains 1,710 feet (520 m), takes 5 to 6 hours round trip, and offers great views of Alpine Lake, Alpine Peak, and the Sawtooth Valley. Visitors are permitted to camp anywhere in the National Forest, and Sawtooth Lake often serves as a camp for further hikes throughout the northern Sawtooth Wilderness.

== See also ==
- List of lakes of the Sawtooth Mountains (Idaho)
- Sawtooth National Forest
- Sawtooth National Recreation Area
- Sawtooth Range (Idaho)
