= Stanley Lake =

Alpine lake in the state of Idaho

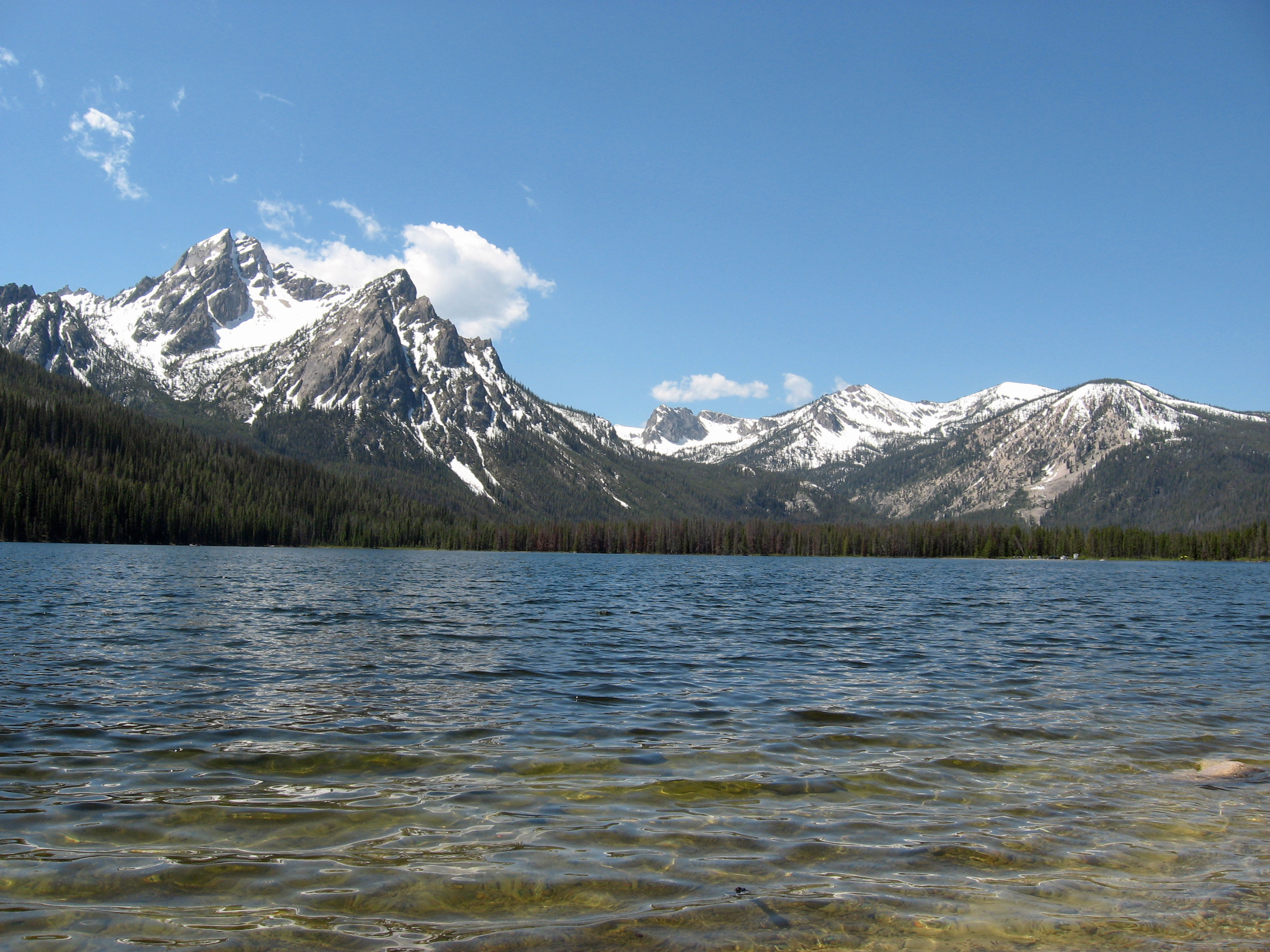
- McGowan Peak and Stanley Lake

- Location within Idaho Location within the United States
- Location: Custer County, Idaho
- Coordinates: 44°14′38″N 115°03′32″W
- Type: Glacial
- Primary inflows: Stanley Lake Creek
- Primary outflows: Stanley Lake Creek to Salmon River
- Basin countries: United States
- Max. length: 1 mile (1.6 km)
- Max. width: 0.5 miles (0.8 km)
- Surface elevation: 6,513 feet (1,985 m)

Stanley Lake is an alpine lake in the western United States, located in Custer County, Idaho, at the base of the Sawtooth Mountains in the Sawtooth National Recreation Area.

The lake is approximately seven miles (11 km) west of Stanley, readily accessed via a three-mile (5 km) spur road from State Highway 21. The surface elevation of the lake is 6,513 feet (1,985 m) above sea level.

Stanley Lake is northeast of the base of the 9,860-foot (3,005 m) McGown Peak, and just south of the considerably smaller Elk Peak. The lake is two miles (3 km) downstream of Lady Face Falls on Stanley Lake Creek; it drains into the main Salmon River via Stanley Lake Creek and Valley Creek.

Recreational facilities at the lake include three campgrounds with nightly fees, a day use area, a boat launch, and hiking trails.

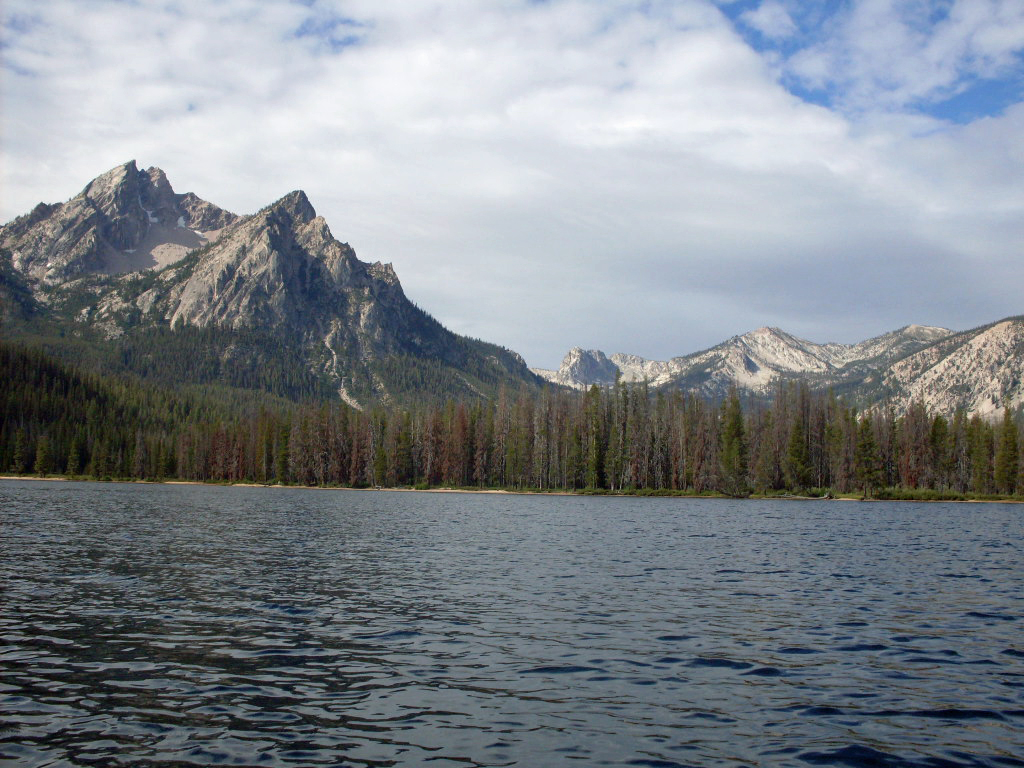
Stanley Lake

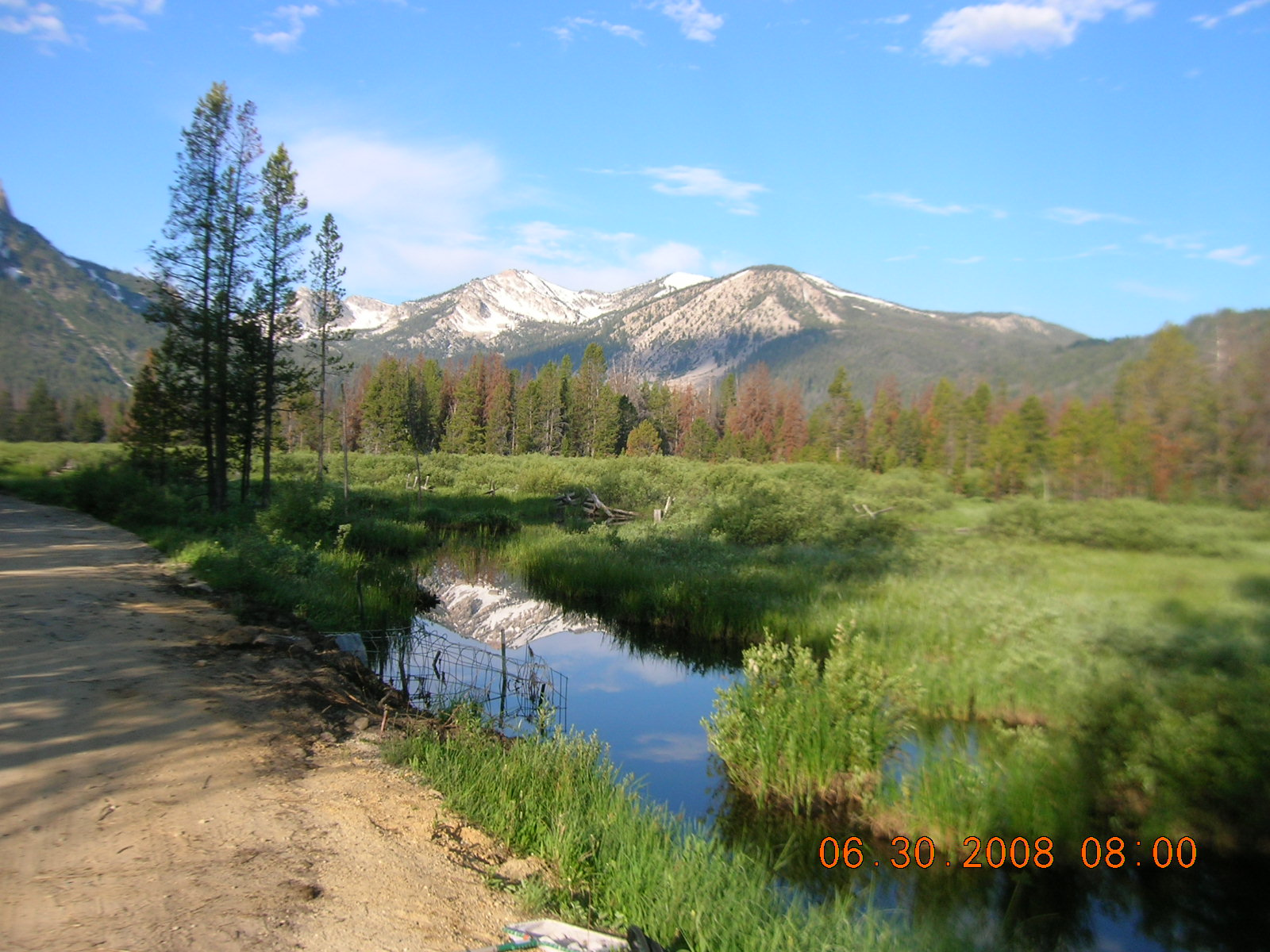
Mountains Behind Stanley Lake

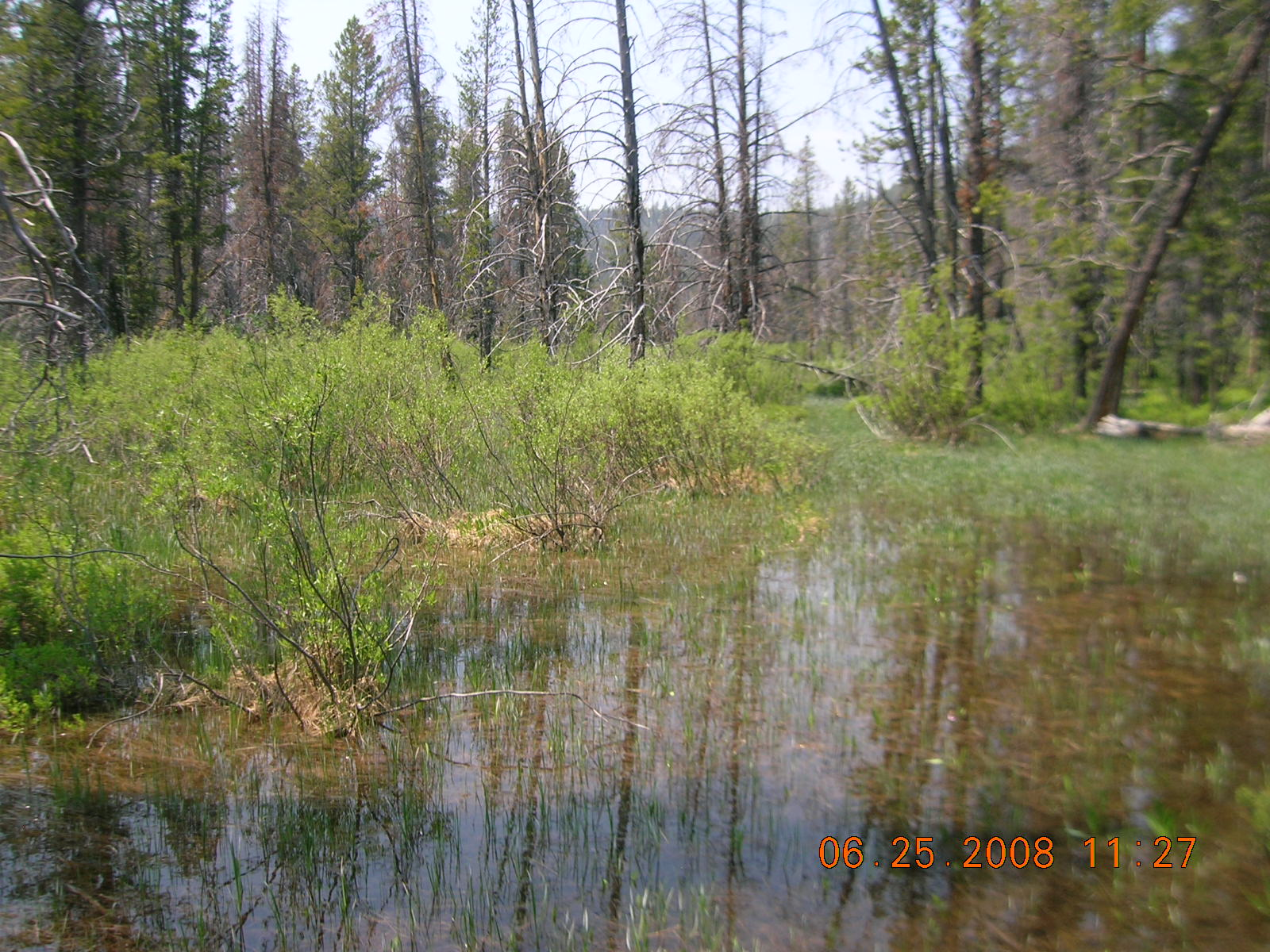
Wetlands Behind Stanley Lake

== See also ==
- List of lakes of the Sawtooth Mountains (Idaho)
- Sawtooth National Forest
- Sawtooth National Recreation Area
- Sawtooth Range (Idaho)
