= Dave's Peak =

Mountain in Idaho, United States

- Location within Idaho

Highest point
- Elevation: 10,579 ft (3,224 m)
- Prominence: 359 ft (109 m)
- Parent peak: Mount Cramer
- Coordinates: 44°01′10″N 114°58′33″W

Geography
- Location: Custer County, Idaho, U.S.
- Parent range: Sawtooth Range
- Topo map: USGS Mount Cramer

Climbing
- Easiest route: Simple climbing, class 4

Dave's Peak, at 10,579 feet (3,224 m) above sea level is an unofficially named peak that is the ninth highest peak in the Sawtooth Range of Idaho. The peak is located in the Sawtooth Wilderness of Sawtooth National Recreation Area in Custer County. The peak is located 0.65 mi (1.05 km) northeast of Mount Cramer, its line parent. Profile and Lucille lakes are southeast of the peak, while Upper, Middle, and Lower Cramer lakes are northwest of the peak. Dave's Peak is south-southwest of Sevy Peak.

== See also ==
- List of peaks of the Sawtooth Range (Idaho)
- List of mountains of Idaho
- List of mountain peaks of Idaho
- List of mountain ranges in Idaho
