= Finger of Fate (Idaho) =

Pillar in Custer County, Idaho, United States

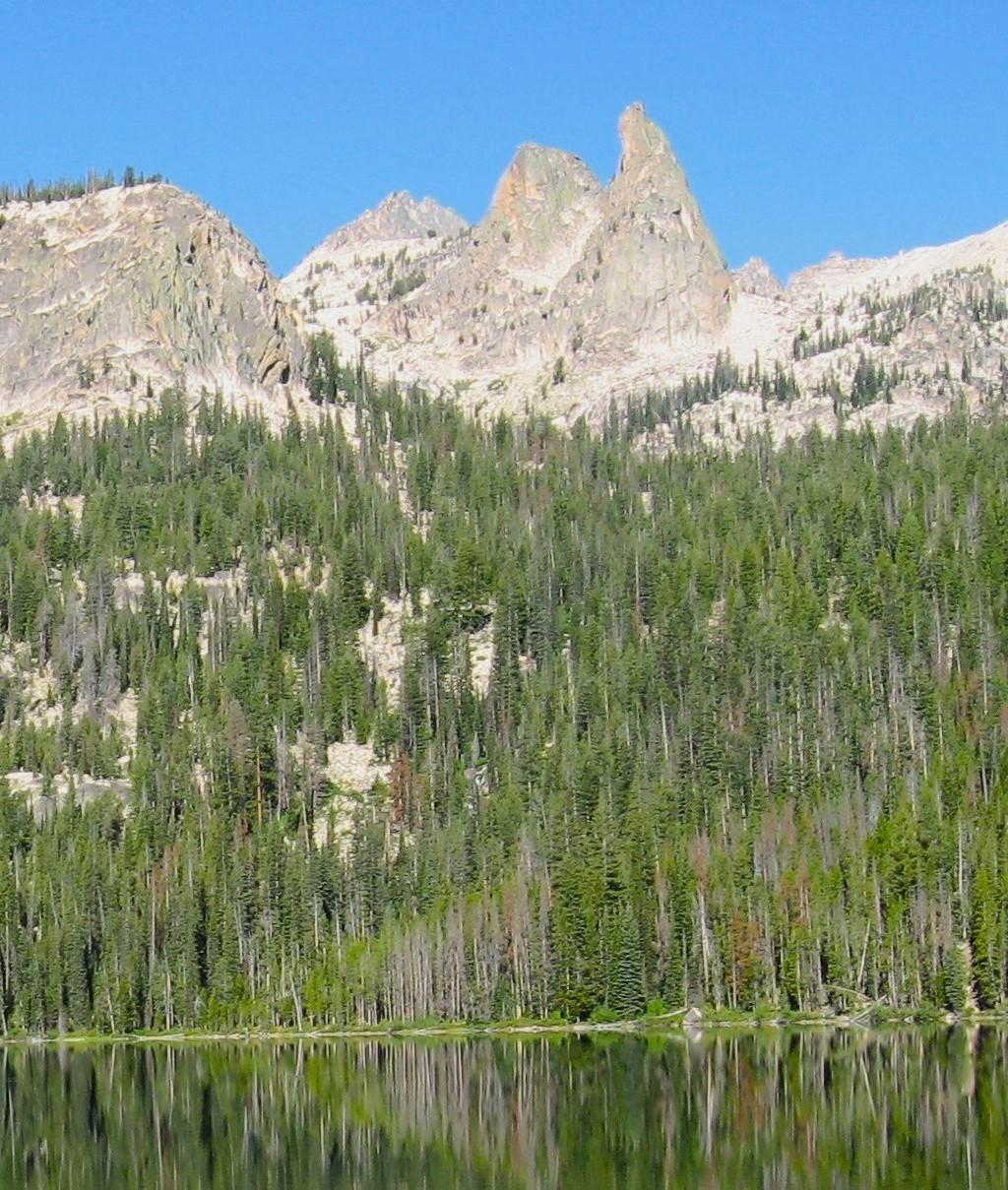
- East aspect, from Hell Roaring Lake

Highest point
- Elevation: 9,780 ft (2,981 m)
- Prominence: 200 ft (61 m)
- Parent peak: Sevy Peak (10,480 ft)
- Isolation: 0.57 mi (0.92 km)
- Coordinates: 44°01′35″N 114°57′43″W

Geography
- Location within Idaho Location within the United States
- Country: United States
- State: Idaho
- County: Custer
- Protected area: Sawtooth Wilderness
- Parent range: Sawtooth Range; Rocky Mountains
- Topo map: USGS Mount Cramer

Geology
- Rock age: Eocene
- Rock type(s): Granodiorite, Granite

Climbing
- First ascent: 1958
- Easiest route: class 4

Finger of Fate is a 9,780-foot-elevation (2,981 m) pillar in Custer County, Idaho, United States.

== Description ==
Finger of Fate is a distinctive landmark and rock-climbing destination in the Sawtooth Range which is a subrange of the Rocky Mountains. It is situated 13 miles (21 km) south of Stanley, Idaho, in the Sawtooth Wilderness on land managed by Sawtooth National Forest. The spire can be seen from Highway 75 at Galena Summit as travelers approach Sawtooth Valley. Precipitation runoff from the mountain drains to Hell Roaring Lake, thence the Salmon River via Hell Roaring Creek. Topographic relief is significant as the summit rises nearly 2,400 feet (732 meters) above the lake in one mile (1.6 km). The first ascent of the summit was made in 1958 by Louis Stur and Jerry Fuller via The Open Book (class 5.8). A 6.5 magnitude earthquake in 2020 dislodged the summit boulder from the top of the pillar. This landform's descriptive toponym has been officially adopted by the United States Board on Geographic Names.

== Climate ==
Based on the Köppen climate classification, Finger of Fate is located in an alpine subarctic climate zone with long, cold, snowy winters, and cool to warm summers. Winter temperatures can drop below 0 °F with wind chill factors below −10 °F. Climbers can expect afternoon rain and lightning from summer thunderstorms.

== Climbing chronology ==
History of early first ascents:

Route	Rating	Year	Climbers
The Open Book	5.8	1958	Louis Stur, Jerry Fuller
East Face	5.11	1967	J. Beaupre, G. Vendor, E. Vendor
First Winter ascent		1973	J. Hecht, H. Bowron, G. Williams, J. Fox
East Face (left)		1978	Reid Dowdle, D. Hough
Drizzlepuss	5.7		B. Gorton and S. Collins

== See also ==
- List of mountain peaks of Idaho
- Geology of the Rocky Mountains

== Gallery ==
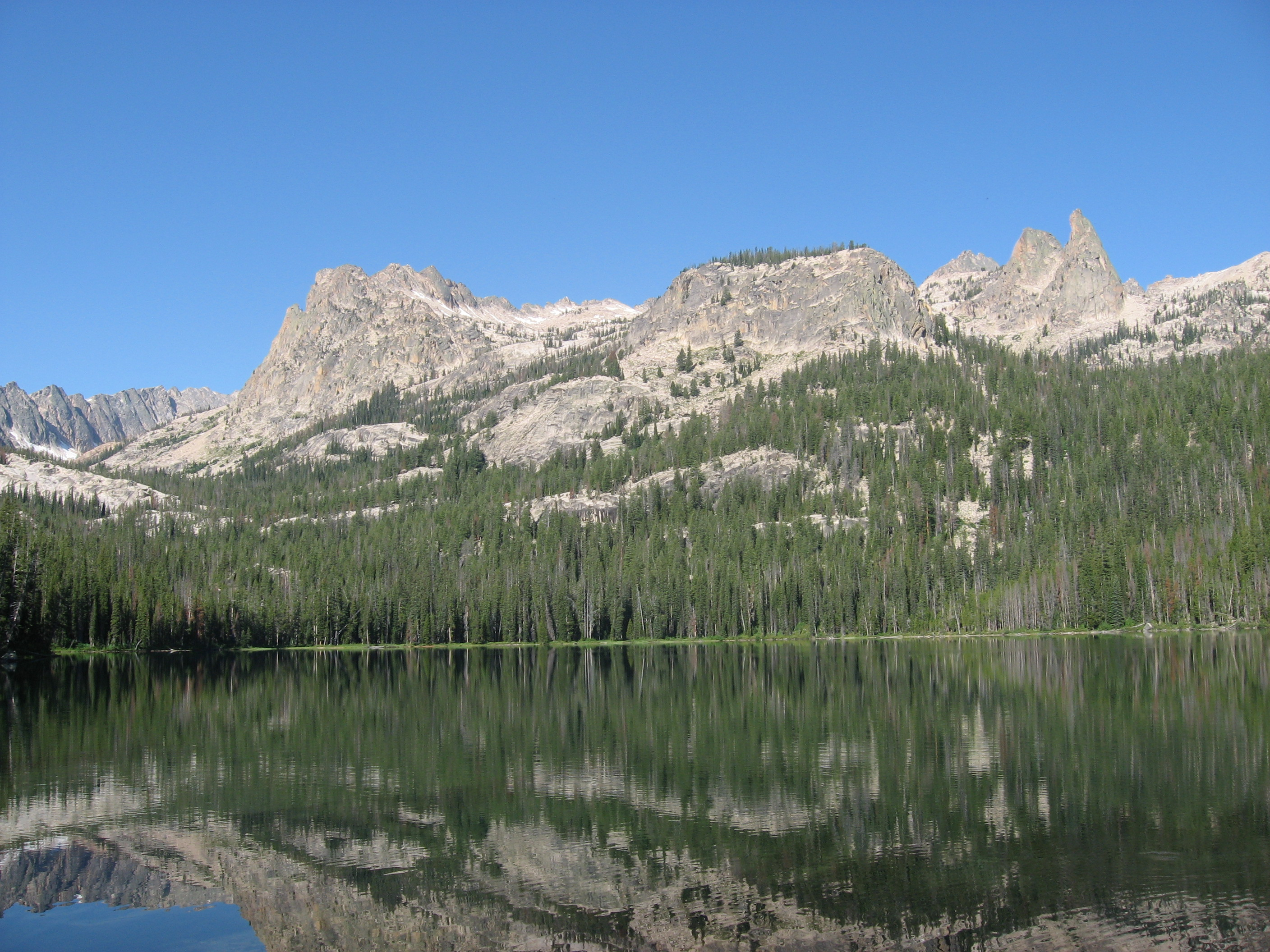
Hell Roaring Lake with Finger of Fate to the right

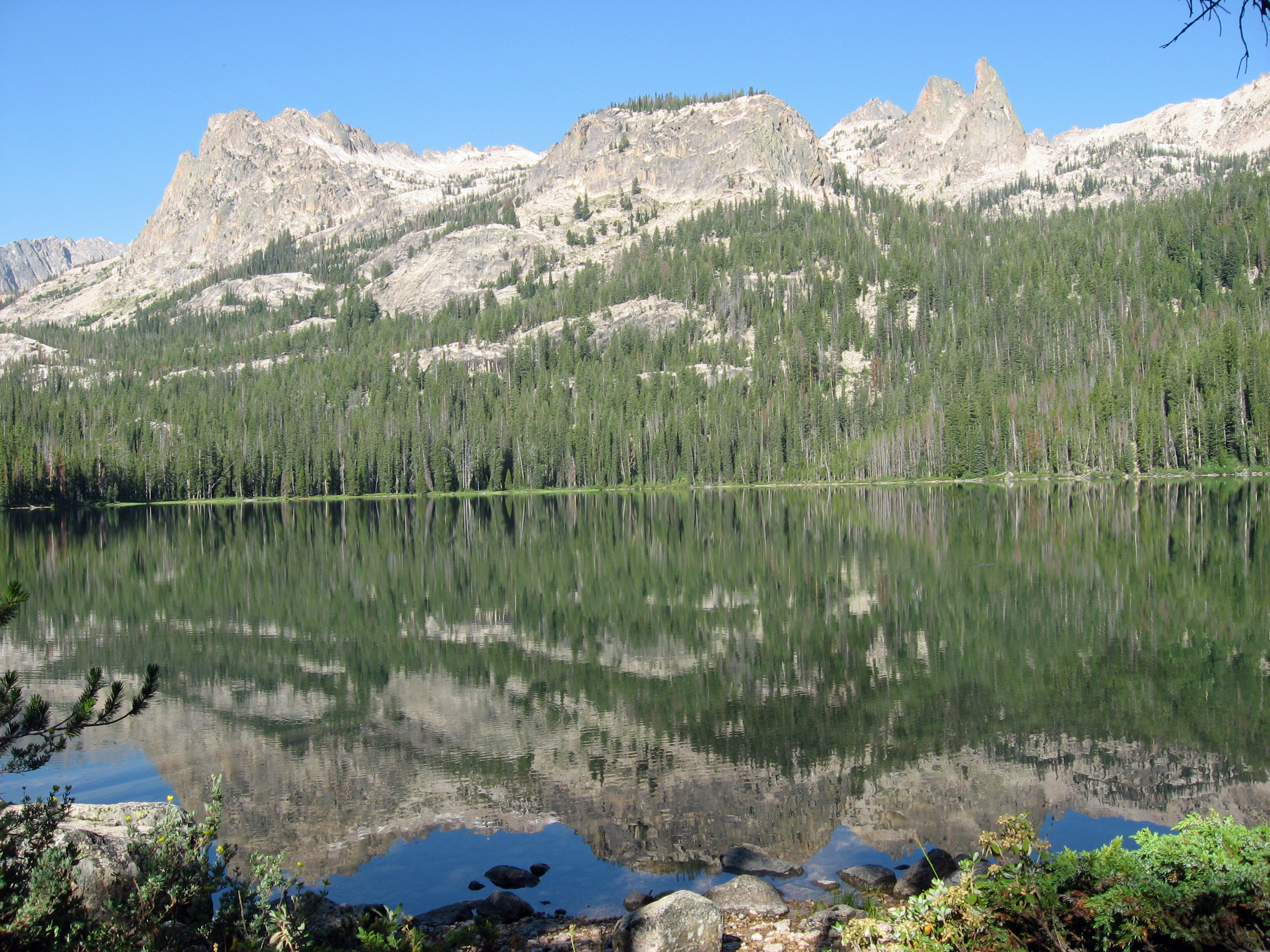
Hell Roaring Lake with Finger of Fate to the right

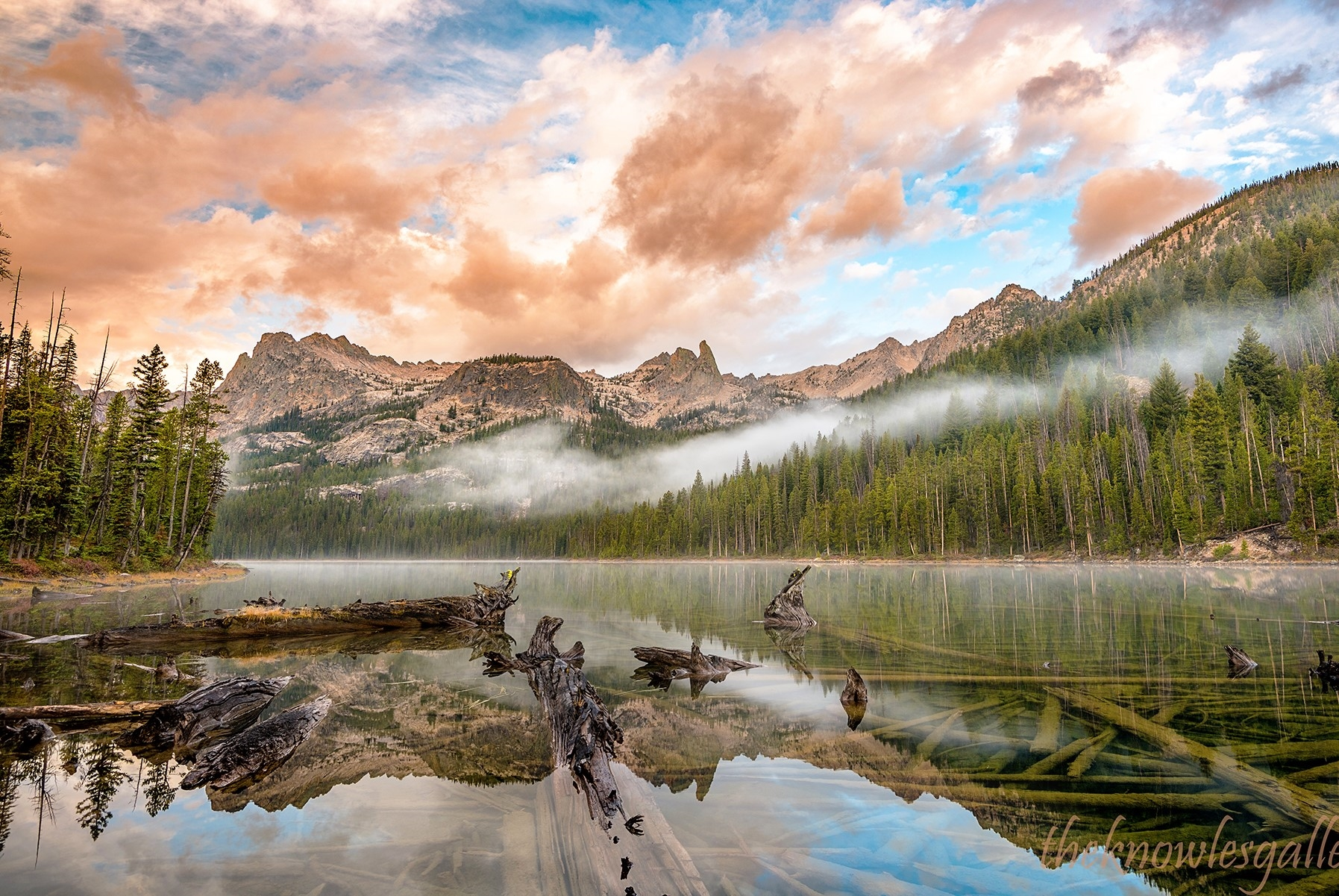
Hell Roaring Lake with Finger of Fate centered on skyline

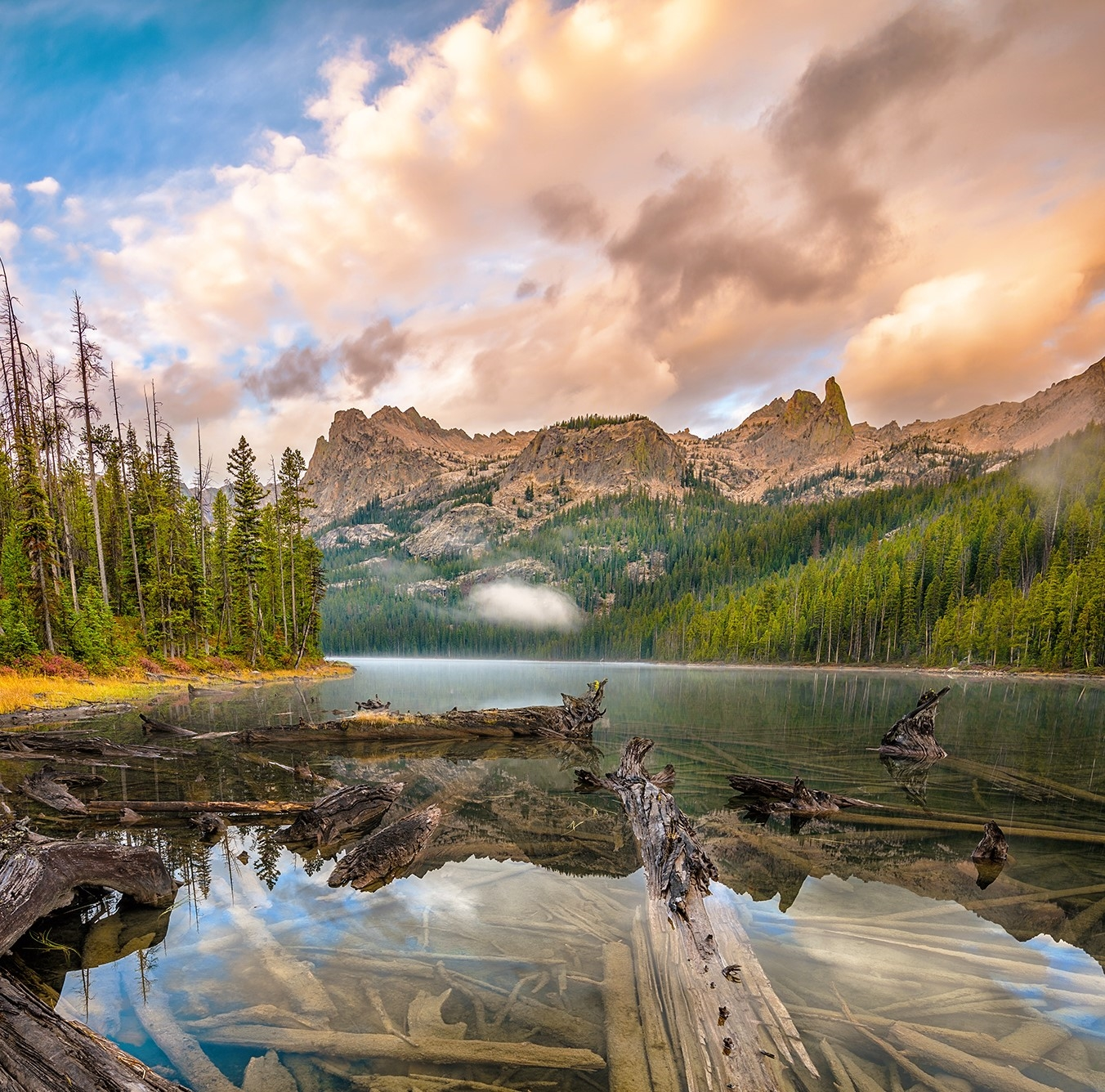
Hell Roaring Lake with Finger of Fate to right
