= Profile Lake =

Profile Lake may refer to:

- Profile Lake (Idaho), a lake in Custer County, Idaho
- Profile Lake (New Hampshire), a lake in Grafton County, New Hampshire
