= Sevy =

Sevy may refer to:

- Jeff Sevy (born 1950), American football player
- Sevy Peak, Idaho, United States
