= Imogene Lake =

Alpine lake in the state of Idaho

- Location within Idaho Location within the United States
- Location: Custer County, Idaho
- Coordinates: 43.995844°N 114.951389°W
- Lake type: Glacial
- Primary inflows: Hell Roaring Creek
- Primary outflows: Hell Roaring Creek to Salmon River
- Basin countries: United States
- Max. length: 0.60 mi (0.97 km)
- Max. width: 0.25 mi (0.40 km)
- Surface elevation: 8,430 ft (2,570 m)
- Islands: 3

Imogene Lake is an alpine lake in Custer County, Idaho, United States, located in the Sawtooth Mountains in the Sawtooth National Recreation Area. The lake is approximately 15 miles (24 km) southwest of Stanley. The lake can be accessed from State Highway 75 in the Sawtooth Valley. There is a trailhead downstream of Hell Roaring Lake at the end of Sawtooth National Forest road 097, which is a high clearance road. There is another trailhead about two miles further downstream along forest road 210 for those who cannot drive road 097 as well as horses.

Hell Roaring Lake is in the Sawtooth Wilderness and wilderness permit can be obtained at trailheads. There are about three (depending on water levels) very small islands in the lake, the largest of which is less than 200 feet (61 m) long. Several other small lakes surround Imogene Lake, while Hell Roaring Lake is downstream, Mushroom Lake is upstream, and Edith Lake over the ridge to the south of Imogene.

== See also ==
- List of lakes of the Sawtooth Mountains (Idaho)
- Sawtooth National Forest
- Sawtooth National Recreation Area
- Sawtooth Range (Idaho)
