= Mushroom Lake =

Lake in Custer County, Idaho, United States

- Location within Idaho Location within the United States
- Location: Custer County, Idaho
- Coordinates: 43°59′24″N 114°57′50″W
- Type: Glacial
- Primary inflows: Hell Roaring Creek
- Primary outflows: Hell Roaring Creek to Salmon River
- Basin countries: United States
- Max. length: 0.13 mi (0.21 km)
- Max. width: 0.12 mi (0.19 km)
- Surface elevation: 8,560 ft (2,610 m)

Mushroom Lake is a small alpine lake in Custer County, Idaho, United States, located in the Sawtooth Mountains in the Sawtooth National Recreation Area. There are no trails leading to the lake, although it is most easily accessed from Sawtooth National Forest trail 092.

Mushroom Lake is in the Sawtooth Wilderness, and a wilderness permit can be obtained at a registration box at trailheads or wilderness boundaries. Hell Roaring Lake and Imogene Lake are downstream of Mushroom Lake.

== See also ==
- List of lakes of the Sawtooth Mountains (Idaho)
- Sawtooth National Recreation Area
