= Upper Cramer Lake =

Alpine lake in the state of Idaho

- Location within Idaho Location within the United States
- Location: Custer County, Idaho
- Coordinates: 44°01′47″N 114°59′13″W
- Type: Glacial
- Primary inflows: Redfish Lake Creek
- Primary outflows: Redfish Lake Creek to Salmon River
- Basin countries: United States
- Max. length: 0.29 mi (0.47 km)
- Max. width: 0.25 mi (0.40 km)
- Surface elevation: 8,395 ft (2,559 m)

Upper Cramer Lake is an alpine lake in Custer County, Idaho, United States, located in the Sawtooth Mountains in the Sawtooth National Recreation Area. Sawtooth National Forest trail 154 leads to the lake.

Upper Cramer Lake is in the Sawtooth Wilderness, and a wilderness permit can be obtained at a registration box at trailheads or wilderness boundaries. Downstream of Upper Cramer Lake are Middle and Lower Cramer Lakes.

== See also ==
- List of lakes of the Sawtooth Mountains (Idaho)
- Sawtooth National Forest
- Sawtooth National Recreation Area
- Sawtooth Range (Idaho)
