= Hell Roaring Lake =

Lake in Idaho, United States

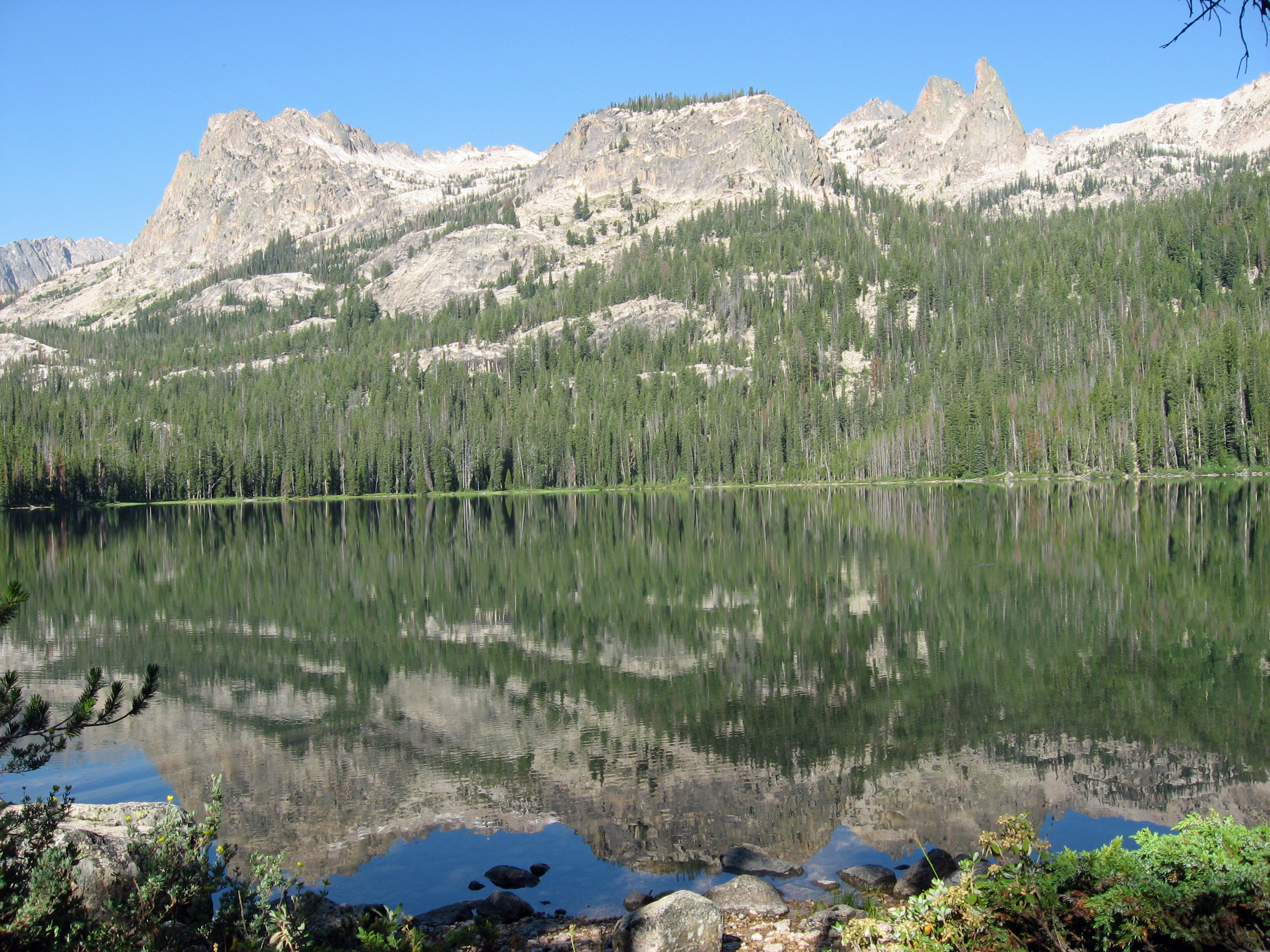
- Hell Roaring Lake

- Location within Idaho Location within the United States
- Location: Custer County, Idaho
- Coordinates: 44°01′26″N 114°56′11″W
- Lake type: Glacial
- Primary inflows: Hell Roaring Creek
- Primary outflows: Hell Roaring Creek to Salmon River
- Basin countries: United States
- Max. length: 0.64 mi (1.03 km)
- Max. width: 0.24 mi (0.39 km)
- Surface elevation: 7,407 ft (2,258 m)

Hell Roaring Lake is an alpine lake in Custer County, Idaho, United States, located in the Sawtooth Mountains in the Sawtooth National Recreation Area. The lake is approximately 13.3 miles (21.4 km) southwest of Stanley. The lake can be accessed from State Highway 75 in the Sawtooth Valley. There is a trailhead about two miles from the lake on Sawtooth National Forest road 097, which is a high clearance road. There is another trailhead about two miles further downstream along forest road 210 for those who cannot drive road 097 as well as horses.

Hell Roaring Lake is in the Sawtooth Wilderness and wilderness permit can be obtained at trailheads. The lake is surrounded by the Finger of Fate at 9,780 feet (2,981 m) and other peaks. Upstream of Hell Roaring Lake is Imogene Lake, Profile Lake, Mushroom Lake, and Lucille Lake.

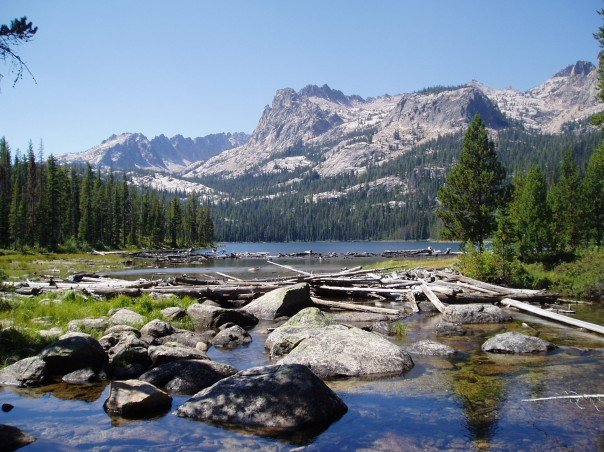
Hell Roaring Lake

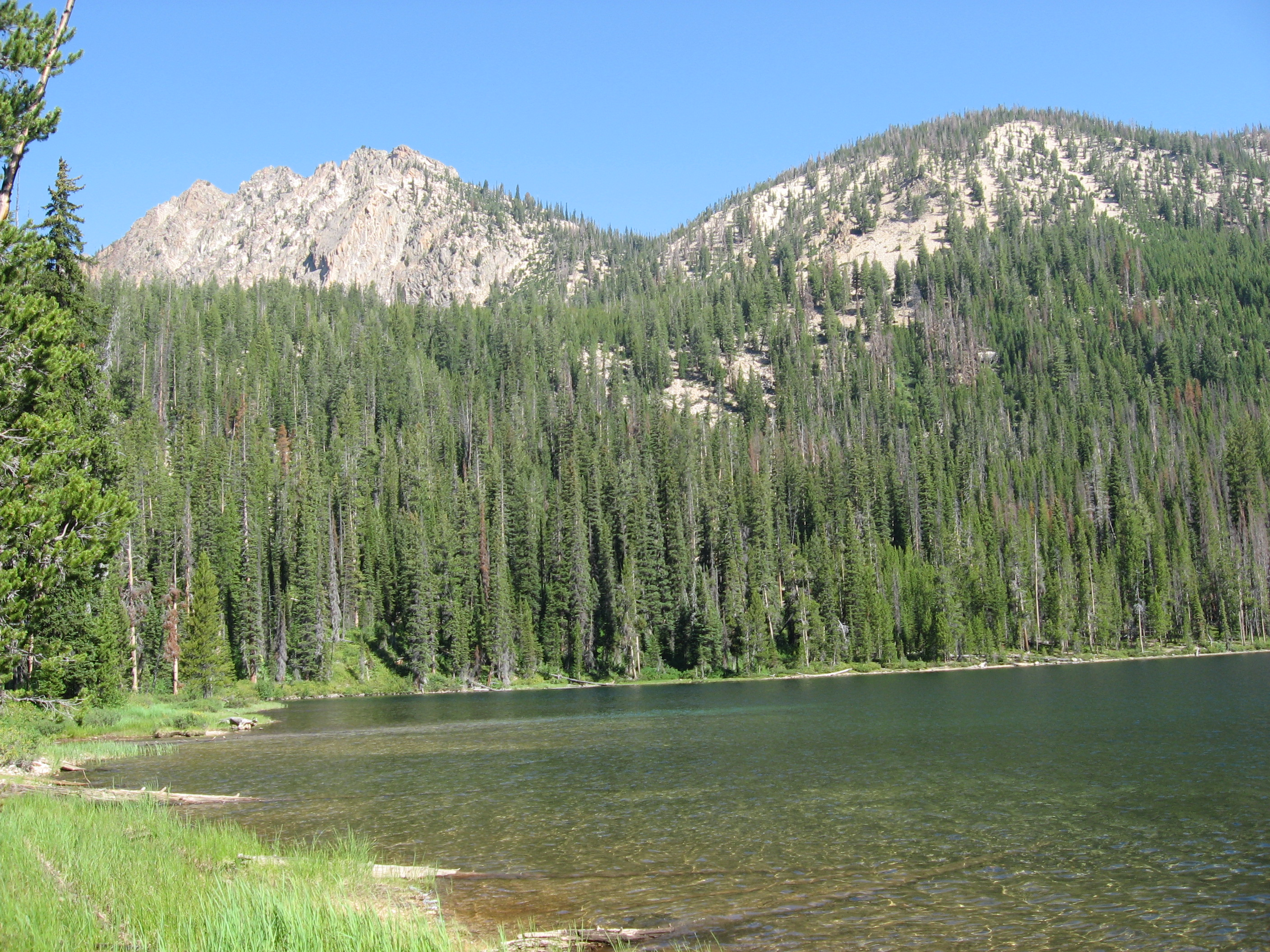
Hell Roaring Lake

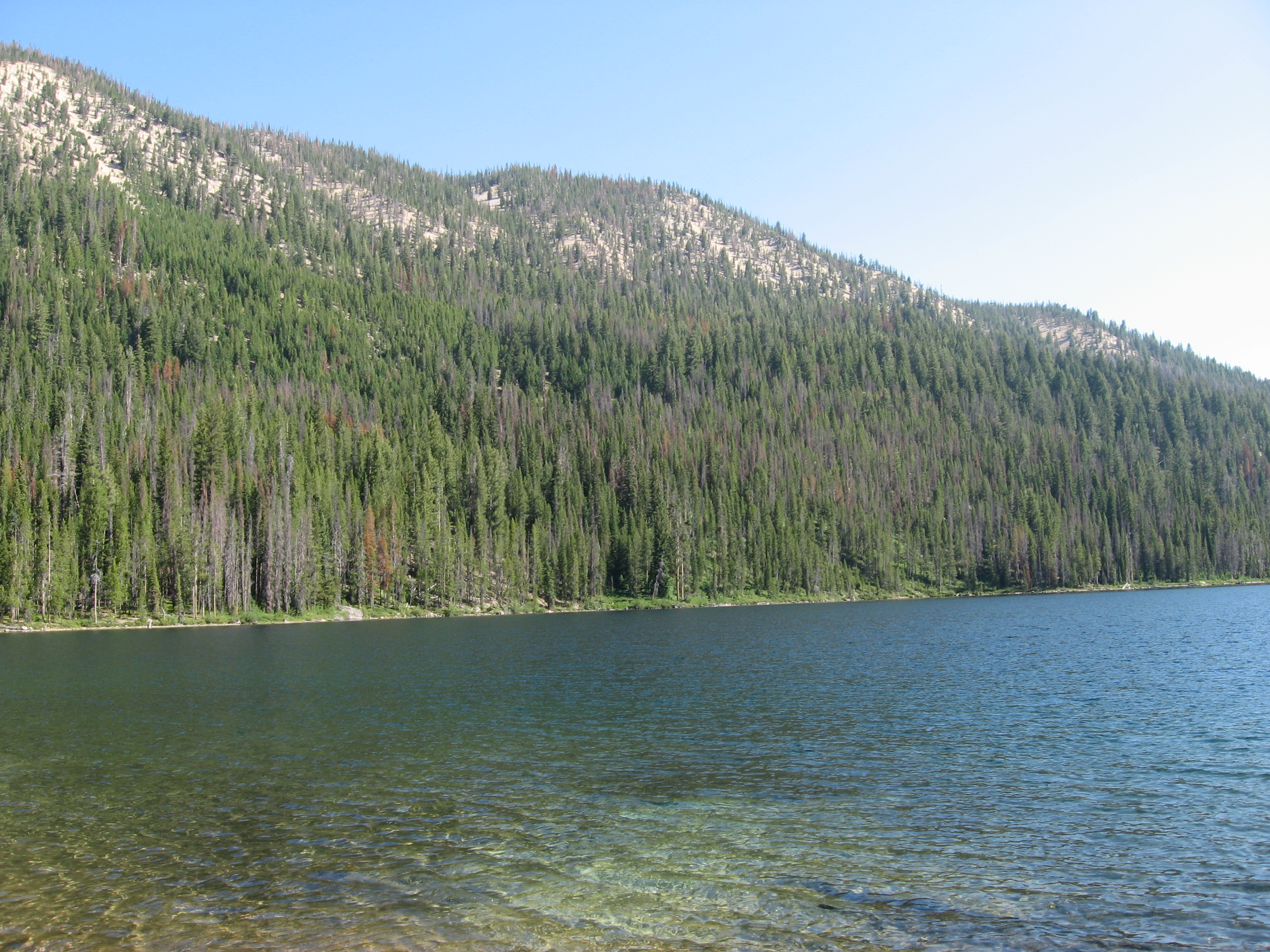
Hell Roaring Lake

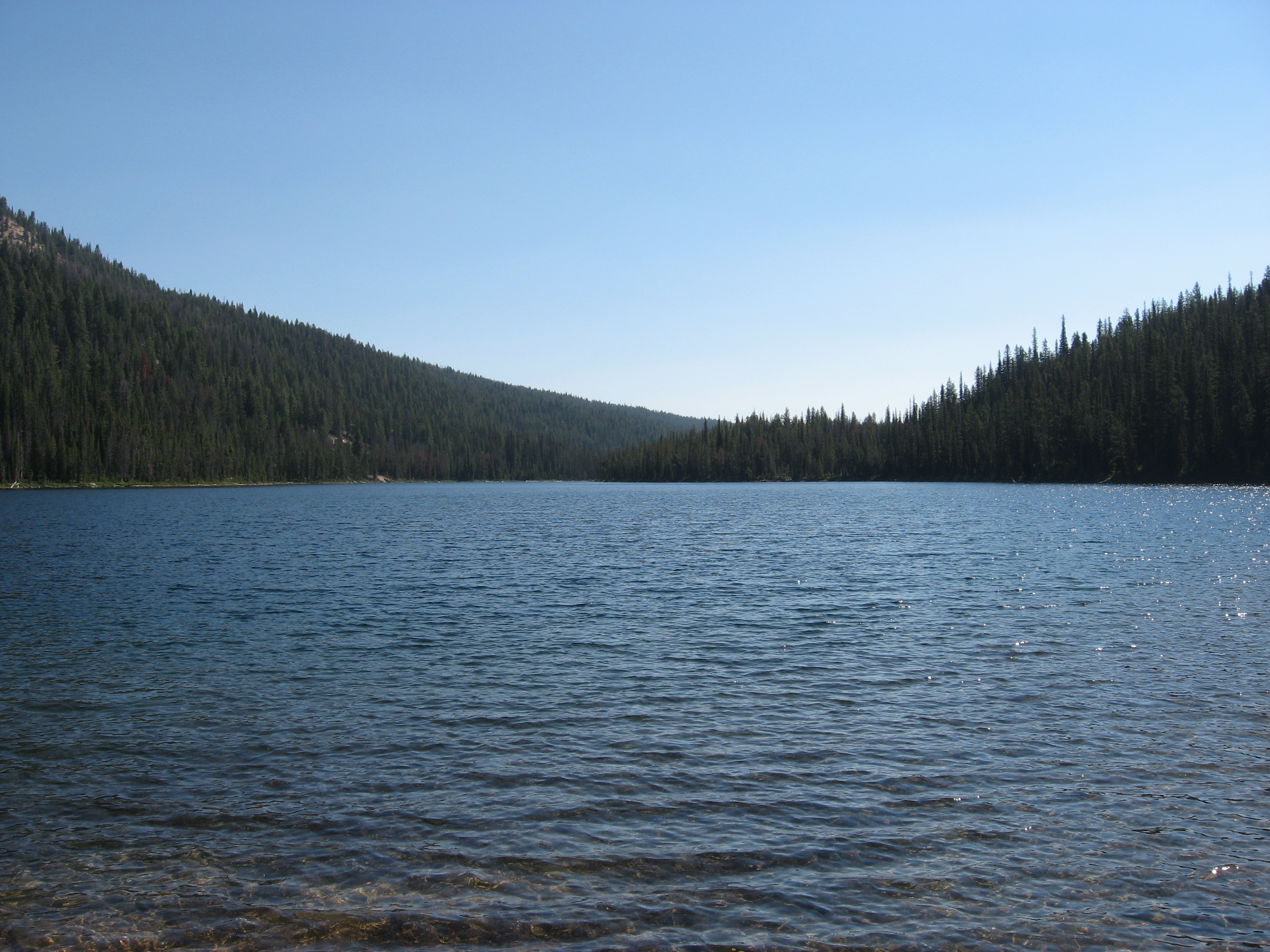
Hell Roaring Lake

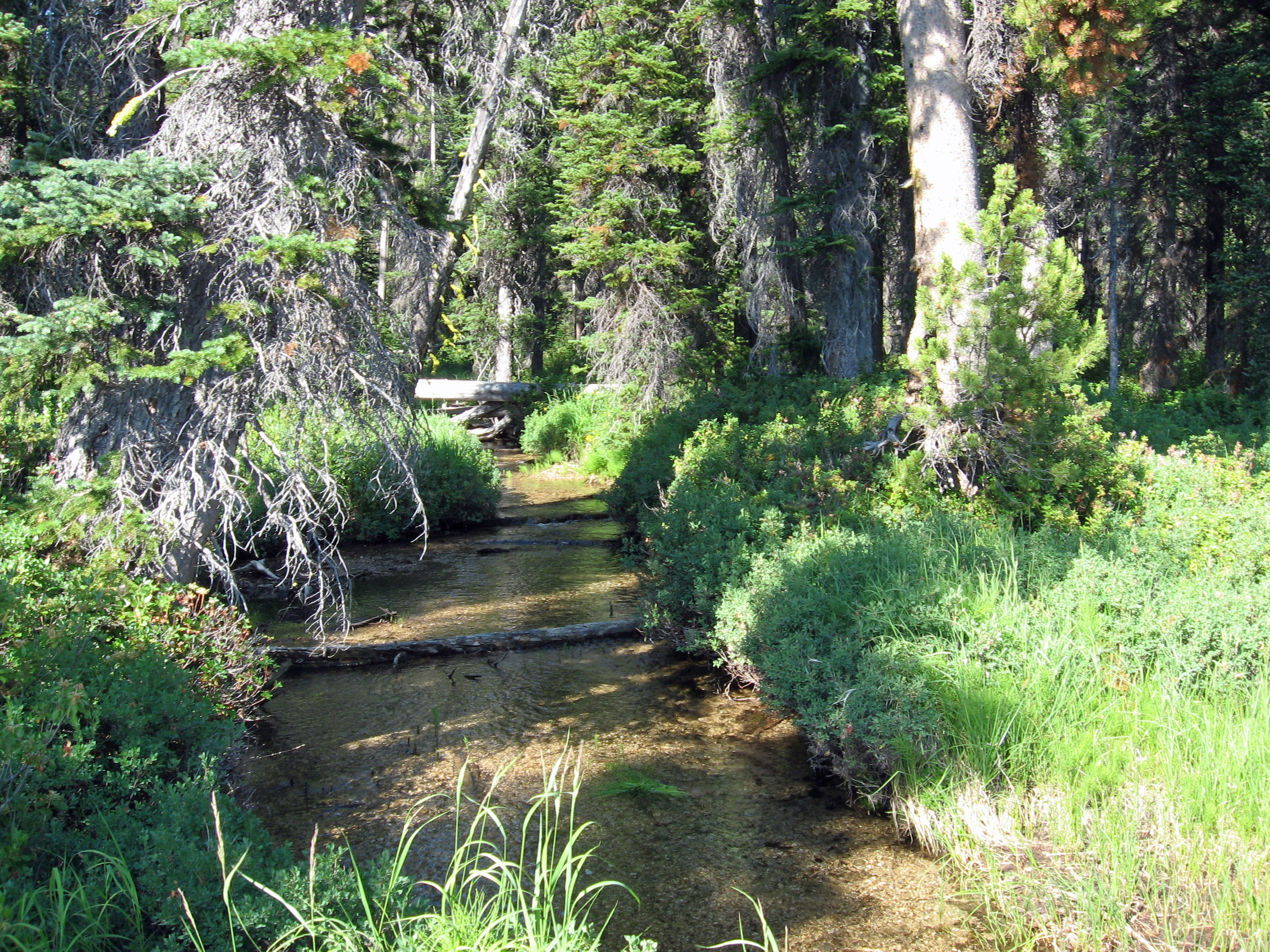
Hell Roaring Creek

== See also ==
- List of lakes of the Sawtooth Mountains (Idaho)
- Sawtooth National Forest
- Sawtooth National Recreation Area
- Sawtooth Range (Idaho)
