= Sevy Peak =

Mountain in the state of Idaho

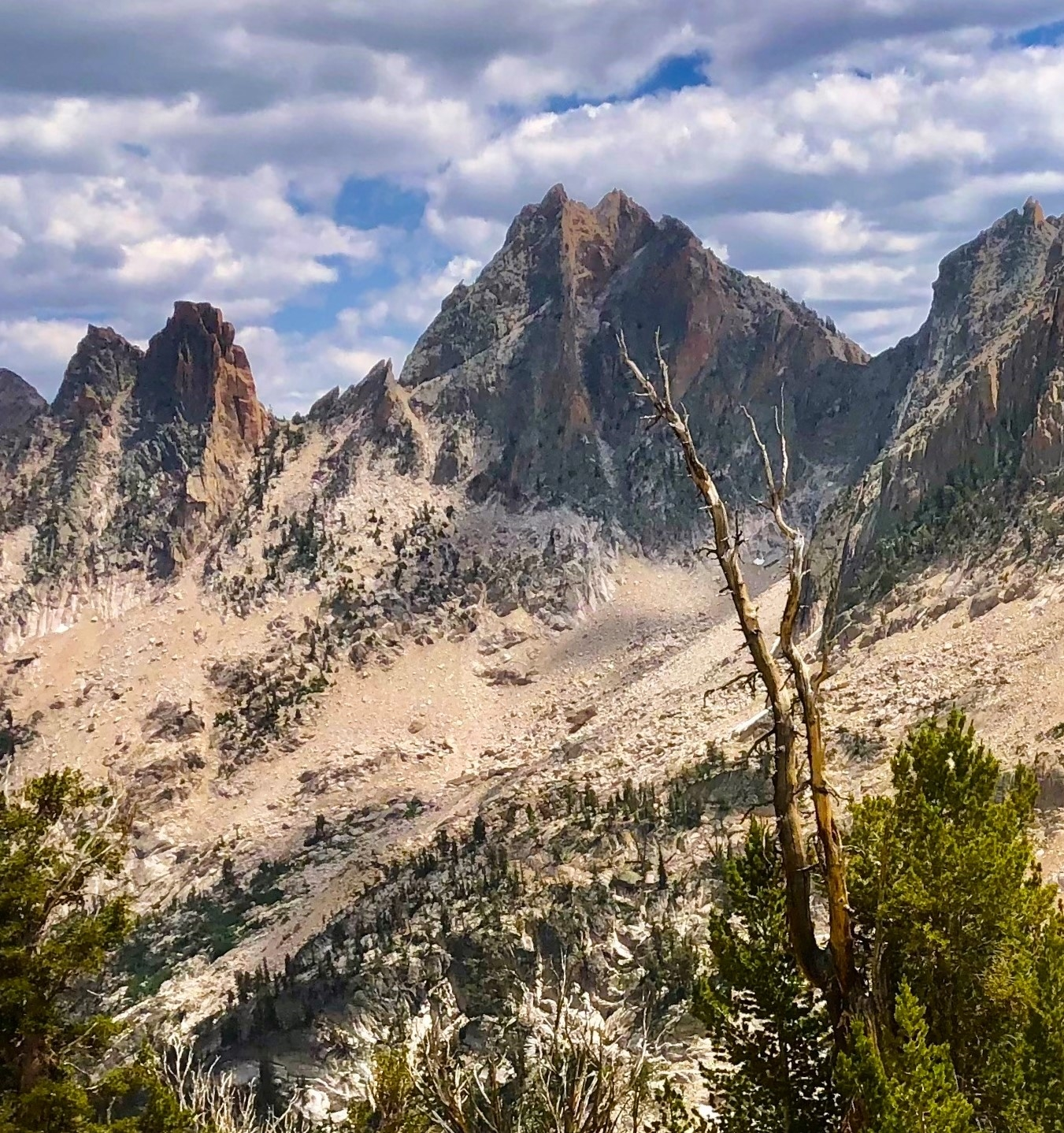
- Southwest aspect

Highest point
- Elevation: 10,480 ft (3,190 m)
- Prominence: 440 ft (134 m)
- Parent peak: Dave's Peak
- Coordinates: 44°01′29″N 114°58′23″W

Geography
- Location within Idaho
- Location: Custer County, Idaho, U.S.
- Parent range: Sawtooth Range
- Topo map: USGS Mount Cramer

Climbing
- Easiest route: class 5.4

Sevy Peak, at 10,480 feet (3,190 m) above sea level is a peak in the Sawtooth Range of Idaho. The peak is located in the Sawtooth Wilderness of Sawtooth National Recreation Area in Custer County. The peak is located 0.39 mi (0.63 km) north-northeast of Dave's Peak, its line parent. It is 1.3 mi (2.1 km) south of Decker Peak. The mountain's toponym was officially adopted in 1973 to remember John Lowe Sevy (1912–1963), a former Sawtooth National Forest Supervisor who contributed much to the development of the forest and spent much of this leisure time in the area around this peak.

== See also ==
- List of peaks of the Sawtooth Range (Idaho)
- List of mountains of Idaho
- List of mountain peaks of Idaho
- List of mountain ranges in Idaho

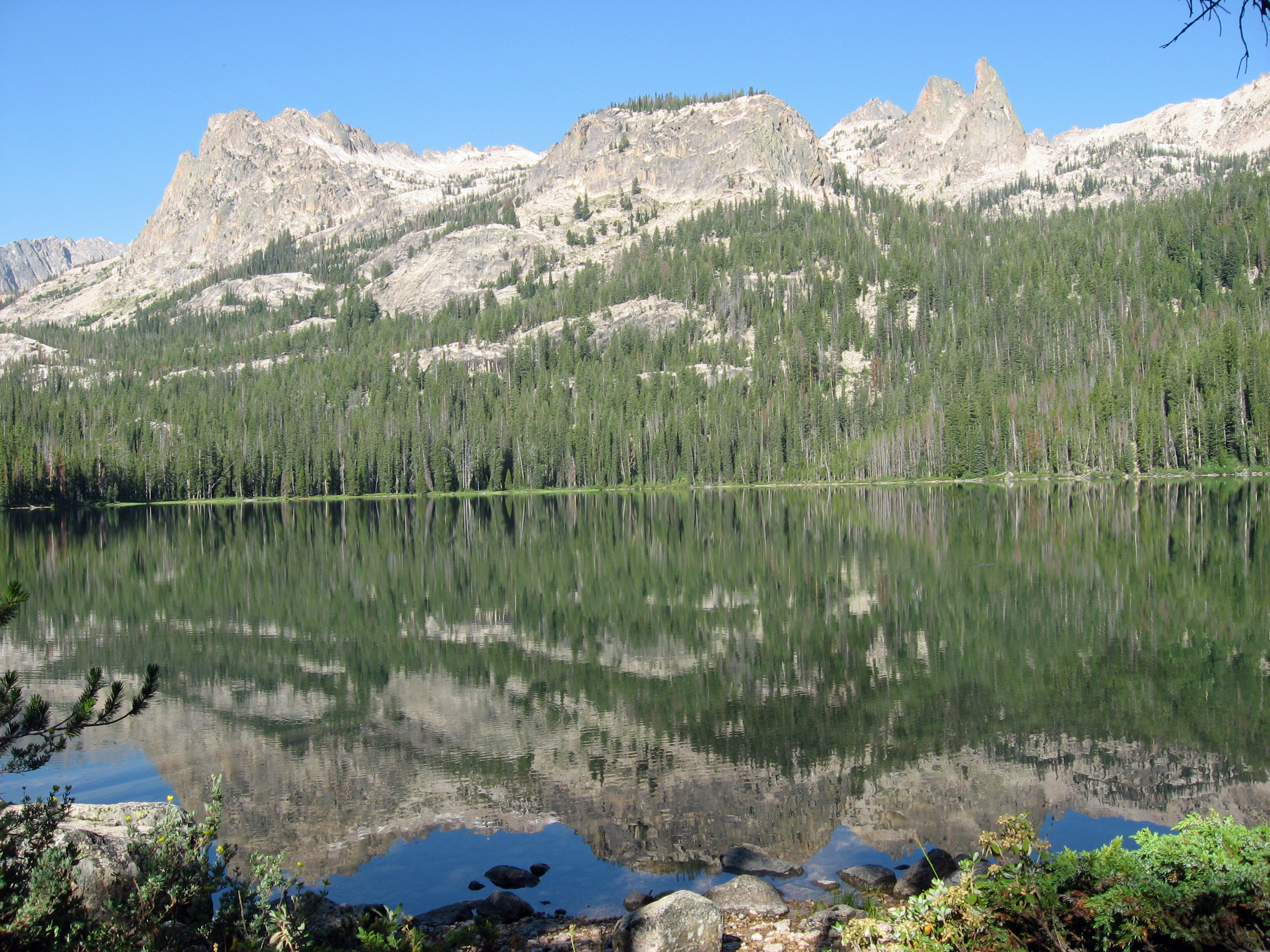
Sevy Peak right of center, left of the Finger of Fate from Hell Roaring Lake
