= Lucille Lake (Idaho) =

Alpine lake in the state of Idaho

- Location within Idaho Location within the United States
- Location: Custer County, Idaho
- Coordinates: 44°00′20″N 114°58′08″W
- Type: Glacial
- Primary outflows: Hell Roaring Creek to Salmon River
- Basin countries: United States
- Max. length: 0.22 mi (0.35 km)
- Max. width: 0.20 mi (0.32 km)
- Surface elevation: 8,760 ft (2,670 m)

Lucille Lake is a small alpine lake in Custer County, Idaho, United States, located in the Sawtooth Mountains in the Sawtooth National Recreation Area. There are no trails leading to the lake, although it is most easily accessed from Sawtooth National Forest trail 092.

Lucille Lake is in the Sawtooth Wilderness, and a wilderness permit can be obtained at a registration box at trailheads or wilderness boundaries. Hell Roaring Lake is downstream of Lucille Lake while Mount Cramer is to the northwest.

== See also ==
- List of lakes of the Sawtooth Mountains (Idaho)
- Sawtooth National Forest
- Sawtooth National Recreation Area
- Sawtooth Range (Idaho)
