= List of mountain peaks of Idaho =

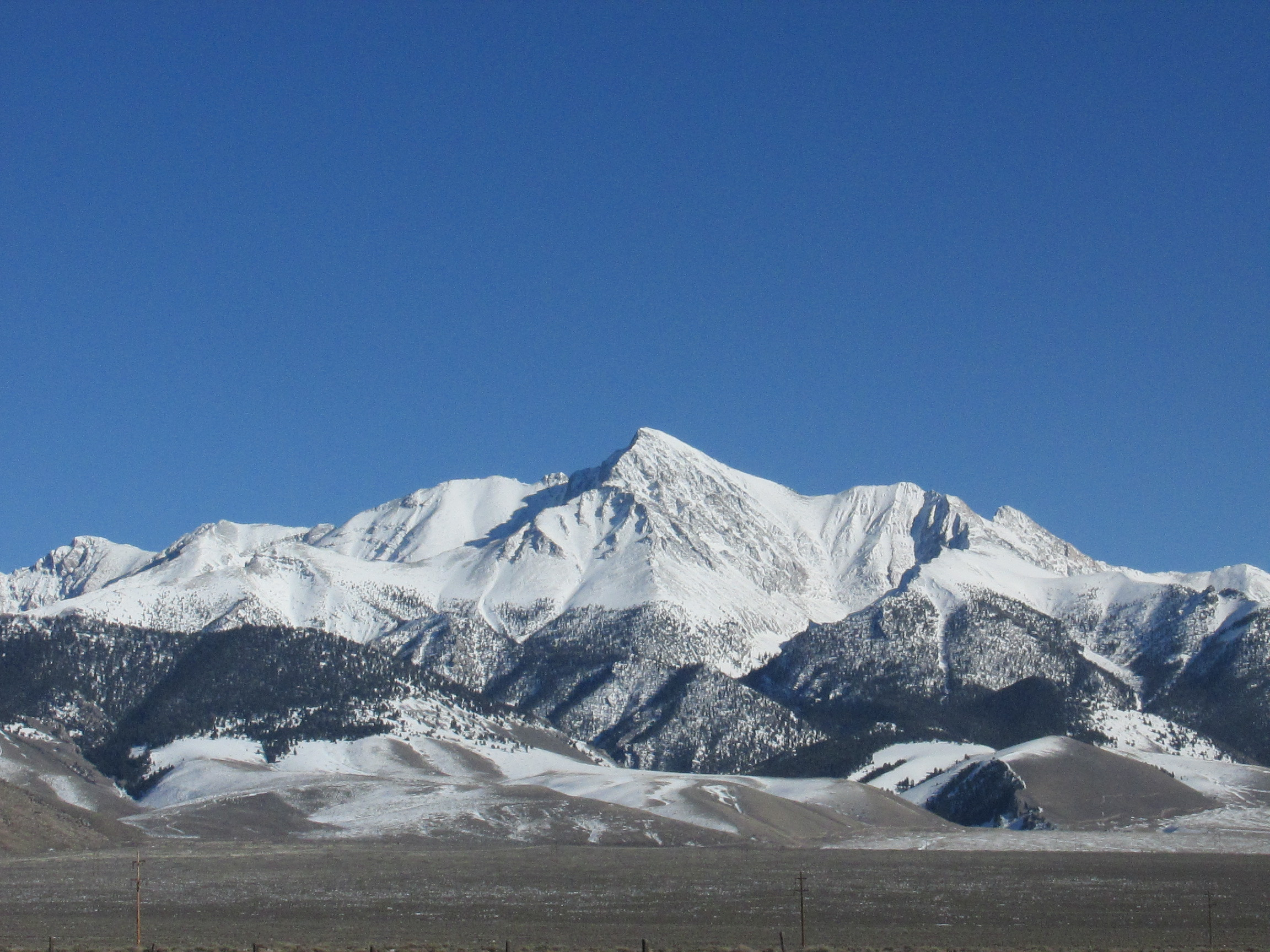
Borah Peak is the highest summit of the U.S. State of Idaho.

This article comprises three sortable tables of major mountain peaks of the U.S. State of Idaho.

The summit of a mountain or hill may be measured in three principal ways:

1. The topographic elevation of a summit measures the height of the summit above a geodetic sea level. The first table below ranks the 40 highest major summits of Idaho by elevation.
2. The topographic prominence of a summit is a measure of how high the summit rises above its surroundings. The second table below ranks the 40 most prominent summits of Idaho.
3. The topographic isolation (or radius of dominance) of a summit measures how far the summit lies from its nearest point of equal elevation. The third table below ranks the 40 most isolated major summits of Idaho.

== Highest major summits ==
Of the highest major summits of Idaho, ten peaks exceed 3500 meters (11,483 feet) elevation and 34 peaks exceed 3000 meters (9843 feet) elevation.

The 40 highest summits of Idaho with at least 500 meters of topographic prominence
Rank	Mountain peak	Mountain range	Elevation	Prominence	Isolation	Location
1	Borah Peak (Note: The summit of Borah Peak is the highest point of the Lost River Range and the U.S. State of Idaho.)	Lost River Range	12,668 ft 3861.2 m	6,002 ft 1829 m	150.8 mi 243 km	44.1374°N 113.7811°W
2	Leatherman Peak (Note: The elevation of Leatherman Peak includes an adjustment of +1.61 m (5.28 ft) from NGVD 29 to NAVD 88.)	Lost River Range	12,233 ft 3729 m	1,688 ft 515 m	4.51 mi 7.26 km	44.0820°N 113.7330°W
3	Diamond Peak (Note: The summit of Diamond Peak is the highest point of the Lemhi Range.)	Lemhi Range	12,202 ft 3719.3 m	5,387 ft 1642 m	31.8 mi 51.2 km	44.1414°N 113.0827°W
4	Hyndman Peak (Note: The summit of Hyndman Peak is the highest point of the Pioneer Mountains.)	Pioneer Mountains	12,012 ft 3661.4 m	4,829 ft 1472 m	30.1 mi 48.5 km	43.7494°N 114.1311°W
5	USGS Peak	Lost River Range	11,988 ft 3653.8 m	1,802 ft 549 m	4.14 mi 6.66 km	44.0133°N 113.5818°W
6	Castle Peak (Note: The summit of Castle Peak is the highest point of the White Cloud Mountains.)	White Cloud Mountains	11,812 ft 3600.4 m	4,035 ft 1230 m	27.3 mi 44 km	44.0402°N 114.5887°W
7	Ryan Peak (Note: The summit of Ryan Peak is the highest point of the Boulder Mountains.)	Boulder Mountains	11,720 ft 3572.2 m	3,214 ft 980 m	12.97 mi 20.9 km	43.9024°N 114.4096°W
8	Bell Mountain	Lemhi Range	11,617 ft 3540.9 m	1,752 ft 534 m	8.56 mi 13.77 km	44.2362°N 113.1939°W
9	Glassford Peak (Note: The elevation of Glassford Peak includes an adjustment of +1.583 m (5.19 ft) from NGVD 29 to NAVD 88.)	Boulder Mountains	11,607 ft 3538 m	1,782 ft 543 m	3.64 mi 5.85 km	43.9123°N 114.4811°W
10	Smiley Mountain	Pioneer Mountains	11,511 ft 3508.6 m	2,648 ft 807 m	11.28 mi 18.15 km	43.6994°N 113.8100°W
11	Scott Peak (Note: The summit of Scott Peak is the highest point of the Beaverhead Mountain.)	Beaverhead Mountains	11,398 ft 3474.2 m	4,243 ft 1293 m	19.56 mi 31.5 km	44.3536°N 112.8211°W
12	Big Creek Peak	Lemhi Range	11,355 ft 3461.1 m	2,517 ft 767 m	22.4 mi 36.1 km	44.4717°N 113.5430°W
13	Shelly Mountain (Note: The summit of Shelly Mountain is the highest point of the White Knob Mountains.)	White Knob Mountains	11,283 ft 3439.2 m	2,344 ft 714 m	9.71 mi 15.63 km	43.8265°N 113.7263°W
14	Dickey Peak	Lost River Range	11,146 ft 3397.3 m	2,823 ft 860 m	4.49 mi 7.22 km	44.2293°N 113.8835°W
15	South Lost River Range high point (Note: The elevation of South Lost River Range high point includes an adjustment of +1.466 m (4.81 ft) from NGVD 29 to NAVD 88.)	Lost River Range	11,086 ft 3379 m	3,444 ft 1050 m	9.33 mi 15.02 km	43.9291°N 113.3353°W
16	Lem Peak	Lemhi Range	10,990 ft 3349.8 m	2,485 ft 757 m	26.5 mi 42.7 km	44.7807°N 113.8664°W
17	Sheep Mountain	Boulder Mountains	10,913 ft 3326.4 m	2,288 ft 697 m	8.72 mi 14.04 km	44.0646°N 114.3601°W
18	Saddle Mountain	Lemhi Range	10,813 ft 3295.8 m	2,385 ft 727 m	11.18 mi 18 km	43.9374°N 112.9544°W
19	Thompson Peak (Note: The summit of Thompson Peak is the highest point of the Sawtooth Range.)	Sawtooth Range	10,756 ft 3278.4 m	2,451 ft 747 m	17.77 mi 28.6 km	44.1415°N 115.0100°W
20	White Mountain West (Note: The summit of White Mountain West is the highest point of the Salmon River Mountains.) (Note: The elevation of White Mountain West includes an adjustment of +1.567 m (5.14 ft) from NGVD 29 to NAVD 88.)	Salmon River Mountains	10,447 ft 3184 m	3,772 ft 1150 m	29.6 mi 47.6 km	44.5749°N 114.4959°W
21	Bromaghin Peak South (Note: The summit of Bromaghin Peak South is the highest point of the Smoky Mountains.) (Note: The elevation of Bromaghin Peak South includes an adjustment of +1.525 m (5 ft) from NGVD 29 to NAVD 88.)	Smoky Mountains	10,446 ft 3184 m	1,781 ft 543 m	6.86 mi 11.04 km	43.8220°N 114.7131°W
22	Cache Peak (Note: The summit of Cache Peak is the highest point of the Albion Range.)	Albion Range	10,343 ft 3152.5 m	4,479 ft 1365 m	81.8 mi 131.6 km	42.1856°N 113.6611°W
23	The General	Salmon River Mountains	10,333 ft 3149.5 m	1,909 ft 582 m	16.42 mi 26.4 km	44.4836°N 114.8031°W
24	Bald Mountain	Salmon River Mountains	10,318 ft 3144.9 m	2,013 ft 614 m	16.18 mi 26 km	44.3672°N 114.3441°W
25	Vienna Benchmark (Note: The summit elevation of Vienna Benchmark includes a vertical offset of +0.914 m (3 ft) from the station benchmark.)	Smoky Mountains	10,232 ft 3118.8 m	1,764 ft 538 m	6.7 mi 10.78 km	43.8506°N 114.8534°W
26	Mount Jefferson (Note: The summit of Mount Jefferson is the highest point of the Centennial Mountains.) (Note: Mount Jefferson lies on the Continental Divide of the Americas between Idaho and Montana.)	Bitterroot Range	10,216 ft 3113.7 m	3,383 ft 1031 m	11.2 mi 18.02 km	44.5620°N 111.5049°W
27	Mount Regan (Note: The elevation of Mount Regan includes an adjustment of +1.587 m (5.21 ft) from NGVD 29 to NAVD 88.)	Sawtooth Range	10,195 ft 3108 m	1,730 ft 527 m	1.9 mi 3.06 km	44.1598°N 115.0616°W
28	Smoky Dome (Note: The summit of Smoky Dome is the highest point of the Soldier Mountains.)	Soldier Mountains	10,096 ft 3077.4 m	3,275 ft 998 m	16.98 mi 27.3 km	43.4933°N 114.9362°W
29	Mount McGuire (Note: The summit of Mount McGuire is the highest point of the Bighorn Crags.)	Salmon River Mountains	10,087 ft 3074.6 m	3,542 ft 1080 m	39.7 mi 64 km	45.1742°N 114.6021°W
30	Meade Peak (Note: The summit of Meade Peak is the highest point of the Preuss Range.)	Preuss Range	9,963 ft 3036.8 m	2,497 ft 761 m	23.5 mi 37.7 km	42.4954°N 111.2490°W
31	Goat Mountain	Beaverhead Mountains	9,948 ft 3032.2 m	2,283 ft 696 m	16.44 mi 26.5 km	44.8234°N 113.4388°W
32	Pinyon Peak	Salmon River Mountains	9,946 ft 3031.5 m	2,002 ft 610 m	8.21 mi 13.21 km	44.5697°N 114.9168°W
33	Sleeping Deer Mountain	Salmon River Mountains	9,887 ft 3013.6 m	1,861 ft 567 m	15.75 mi 25.3 km	44.7672°N 114.6913°W
34	Taylor Mountain (Note: Taylor Mountain lies on the Continental Divide of the Americas between Idaho and Montana.)	Bitterroot Range	9,860 ft 3005.2 m	1,880 ft 573 m	8.79 mi 14.15 km	44.5616°N 111.6830°W
35	She Devil (Note: The summit of She Devil is the highest point of the Seven Devils Mountains.) (Note: The elevation of She Devil includes an adjustment of +1.365 m (4.48 ft) from NGVD 29 to NAVD 88.)	Seven Devils Mountains	9,424 ft 2873 m	5,240 ft 1597 m	31.5 mi 50.6 km	45.3240°N 116.5406°W
36	Black Pine Mountains high point (Note: The summit of Black Pine Mountains high point is the highest point of the Black Pine Mountains.)	Black Pine Mountains	9,389 ft 2861.7 m	4,095 ft 1248 m	20.1 mi 32.3 km	42.1389°N 113.1259°W
37	North Loon Mountain (Note: The summit of North Loon Mountain is the highest point of the Lick Creek Range.) (Note: The elevation of North Loon Mountain includes an adjustment of +1.3 m (4.27 ft) from NGVD 29 to NAVD 88.)	Salmon River Mountains	9,326 ft 2843 m	2,974 ft 906 m	31.7 mi 51.1 km	45.1125°N 115.8728°W
38	Oxford Peak (Note: The summit of Oxford Peak is the highest point of the Bannock Range.)	Bannock Range	9,285 ft 2830.2 m	4,012 ft 1223 m	26.6 mi 42.8 km	42.2696°N 112.0979°W
39	Bonneville Peak (Note: The summit of Bonneville Peak is the highest point of the Portneuf Range.) (Note: The elevation of Bonneville Peak includes an adjustment of +1.222 m (4.01 ft) from NGVD 29 to NAVD 88.)	Portneuf Range	9,275 ft 2827 m	3,401 ft 1037 m	34.1 mi 54.9 km	42.7633°N 112.1411°W
40	Sedgwick Peak (Note: The summit elevation of Sedgwick Peak includes a vertical offset of +0.61 m (2 ft) from the station benchmark.)	Portneuf Range	9,176 ft 2796.8 m	3,642 ft 1110 m	19.19 mi 30.9 km	42.5157°N 111.9234°W

== Most prominent summits ==
Of the most prominent summits of Idaho, three peaks are ultra-prominent summits with more than 1500 meters (4921 feet) of topographic prominence and 20 peaks exceed 1000 meters (3281 feet) of topographic prominence.

The 40 most topographically prominent summits of Idaho
Rank	Mountain peak	Mountain range	Elevation	Prominence	Isolation	Location
1	Borah Peak	Lost River Range	12,668 ft 3861.2 m	6,002 ft 1829 m	150.8 mi 243 km	44.1374°N 113.7811°W
2	Diamond Peak	Lemhi Range	12,202 ft 3719.3 m	5,387 ft 1642 m	31.8 mi 51.2 km	44.1414°N 113.0827°W
3	She Devil	Seven Devils Mountains	9,424 ft 2873 m	5,240 ft 1597 m	31.5 mi 50.6 km	45.3240°N 116.5406°W
4	Hyndman Peak	Pioneer Mountains	12,012 ft 3661.4 m	4,829 ft 1472 m	30.1 mi 48.5 km	43.7494°N 114.1311°W
5	Scotchman Peak	Cabinet Mountains	7,017 ft 2138.7 m	4,669 ft 1423 m	17.99 mi 29 km	48.1891°N 116.0813°W
6	Cache Peak	Albion Range	10,343 ft 3152.5 m	4,479 ft 1365 m	81.8 mi 131.6 km	42.1856°N 113.6611°W
7	Scott Peak	Beaverhead Mountains	11,398 ft 3474.2 m	4,243 ft 1293 m	19.56 mi 31.5 km	44.3536°N 112.8211°W
8	Black Pine Mountains high point	Black Pine Mountains	9,389 ft 2861.7 m	4,095 ft 1248 m	20.1 mi 32.3 km	42.1389°N 113.1259°W
9	Castle Peak	White Cloud Mountains	11,812 ft 3600.4 m	4,035 ft 1230 m	27.3 mi 44 km	44.0402°N 114.5887°W
10	Oxford Peak	Bannock Range	9,285 ft 2830.2 m	4,012 ft 1223 m	26.6 mi 42.8 km	42.2696°N 112.0979°W
11	White Mountain West	Salmon River Mountains	10,447 ft 3184 m	3,772 ft 1150 m	29.6 mi 47.6 km	44.5749°N 114.4959°W
12	Sedgwick Peak	Portneuf Range	9,176 ft 2796.8 m	3,642 ft 1110 m	19.19 mi 30.9 km	42.5157°N 111.9234°W
13	Mount McGuire	Salmon River Mountains	10,087 ft 3074.6 m	3,542 ft 1080 m	39.7 mi 64 km	45.1742°N 114.6021°W
14	Elkhorn Peak	Bannock Range	9,095 ft 2772.3 m	3,515 ft 1071 m	12.63 mi 20.3 km	42.3340°N 112.3285°W
15	Sturgill Peak (Note: The summit of Sturgill Peak is the highest point of the Hitt Mountains.)	Hitt Mountains	7,593 ft 2314.3 m	3,449 ft 1051 m	13.06 mi 21 km	44.6200°N 116.9433°W
16	South Lost River Range high point	Lost River Range	11,086 ft 3379 m	3,444 ft 1050 m	9.33 mi 15.02 km	43.9291°N 113.3353°W
17	Buffalo Hump	Clearwater Mountains	8,942 ft 2725.6 m	3,438 ft 1048 m	33.1 mi 53.3 km	45.6205°N 115.6993°W
18	Bonneville Peak	Portneuf Range	9,275 ft 2827 m	3,401 ft 1037 m	34.1 mi 54.9 km	42.7633°N 112.1411°W
19	Mount Jefferson	Bitterroot Range	10,216 ft 3113.7 m	3,383 ft 1031 m	11.2 mi 18.02 km	44.5620°N 111.5049°W
20	South Selkirk Crest (Note: The elevation of South Selkirk Crest includes an adjustment of +1.42 m (4.66 ft) from NGVD 29 to NAVD 88.)	Selkirk Mountains	7,719 ft 2353 m	3,375 ft 1029 m	29.5 mi 47.5 km	48.8455°N 116.5544°W
21	Smoky Dome	Soldier Mountains	10,096 ft 3077.4 m	3,275 ft 998 m	16.98 mi 27.3 km	43.4933°N 114.9362°W
22	Queen Mountain	Purcell Mountains	6,116 ft 1864.2 m	3,252 ft 991 m	8.62 mi 13.87 km	48.8782°N 116.2150°W
23	Deep Creek Peak (Note: The summit of Deep Creek Peak is the highest point of the Deep Creek Mountains.)	Deep Creek Mountains	8,752 ft 2667.7 m	3,248 ft 990 m	19.26 mi 31 km	42.4713°N 112.6560°W
24	Ryan Peak	Boulder Mountains	11,720 ft 3572.2 m	3,214 ft 980 m	12.97 mi 20.9 km	43.9024°N 114.4096°W
25	Cinnabar Mountain (Note: The summit of Cinnabar Mountain is the highest point of the Owyhee Mountains.)	Owyhee Mountains	8,409 ft 2563.2 m	3,133 ft 955 m	71.5 mi 115.1 km	42.9805°N 116.6575°W
26	North Loon Mountain	Salmon River Mountains	9,326 ft 2843 m	2,974 ft 906 m	31.7 mi 51.1 km	45.1125°N 115.8728°W
27	Dickey Peak	Lost River Range	11,146 ft 3397.3 m	2,823 ft 860 m	4.49 mi 7.22 km	44.2293°N 113.8835°W
28	Smiley Mountain	Pioneer Mountains	11,511 ft 3508.6 m	2,648 ft 807 m	11.28 mi 18.15 km	43.6994°N 113.8100°W
29	Big Creek Peak	Lemhi Range	11,355 ft 3461.1 m	2,517 ft 767 m	22.4 mi 36.1 km	44.4717°N 113.5430°W
30	Meade Peak	Preuss Range	9,963 ft 3036.8 m	2,497 ft 761 m	23.5 mi 37.7 km	42.4954°N 111.2490°W
31	Lem Peak	Lemhi Range	10,990 ft 3349.8 m	2,485 ft 757 m	26.5 mi 42.7 km	44.7807°N 113.8664°W
32	Thompson Peak	Sawtooth Range	10,756 ft 3278.4 m	2,451 ft 747 m	17.77 mi 28.6 km	44.1415°N 115.0100°W
33	Saddle Mountain	Lemhi Range	10,813 ft 3295.8 m	2,385 ft 727 m	11.18 mi 18 km	43.9374°N 112.9544°W
34	Shelly Mountain	White Knob Mountains	11,283 ft 3439.2 m	2,344 ft 714 m	9.71 mi 15.63 km	43.8265°N 113.7263°W
35	Sheep Mountain	Boulder Mountains	10,913 ft 3326.4 m	2,288 ft 697 m	8.72 mi 14.04 km	44.0646°N 114.3601°W
36	Goat Mountain	Beaverhead Mountains	9,948 ft 3032.2 m	2,283 ft 696 m	16.44 mi 26.5 km	44.8234°N 113.4388°W
37	Bald Mountain	Salmon River Mountains	10,318 ft 3144.9 m	2,013 ft 614 m	16.18 mi 26 km	44.3672°N 114.3441°W
38	Pinyon Peak	Salmon River Mountains	9,946 ft 3031.5 m	2,002 ft 610 m	8.21 mi 13.21 km	44.5697°N 114.9168°W
39	The General	Salmon River Mountains	10,333 ft 3149.5 m	1,909 ft 582 m	16.42 mi 26.4 km	44.4836°N 114.8031°W
40	Taylor Mountain	Bitterroot Range	9,860 ft 3005.2 m	1,880 ft 573 m	8.79 mi 14.15 km	44.5616°N 111.6830°W

== Most isolated major summits ==
Of the most isolated major summits of Idaho, Borah Peak exceeds 200 kilometers (124.3 miles) of topographic isolation and three peaks exceed 100 kilometers (62.14 miles) of topographic isolation.

The 40 most topographically isolated summits of Idaho with at least 500 meters of topographic prominence
Rank	Mountain peak	Mountain range	Elevation	Prominence	Isolation	Location
1	Borah Peak	Lost River Range	12,668 ft 3861.2 m	6,002 ft 1829 m	150.8 mi 243 km	44.1374°N 113.7811°W
2	Cache Peak	Albion Range	10,343 ft 3152.5 m	4,479 ft 1365 m	81.8 mi 131.6 km	42.1856°N 113.6611°W
3	Cinnabar Mountain	Owyhee Mountains	8,409 ft 2563.2 m	3,133 ft 955 m	71.5 mi 115.1 km	42.9805°N 116.6575°W
4	Mount McGuire	Salmon River Mountains	10,087 ft 3074.6 m	3,542 ft 1080 m	39.7 mi 64 km	45.1742°N 114.6021°W
5	Bonneville Peak	Portneuf Range	9,275 ft 2827 m	3,401 ft 1037 m	34.1 mi 54.9 km	42.7633°N 112.1411°W
6	Buffalo Hump	Clearwater Mountains	8,942 ft 2725.6 m	3,438 ft 1048 m	33.1 mi 53.3 km	45.6205°N 115.6993°W
7	Diamond Peak	Lemhi Range	12,202 ft 3719.3 m	5,387 ft 1642 m	31.8 mi 51.2 km	44.1414°N 113.0827°W
8	North Loon Mountain	Salmon River Mountains	9,326 ft 2843 m	2,974 ft 906 m	31.7 mi 51.1 km	45.1125°N 115.8728°W
9	She Devil	Seven Devils Mountains	9,424 ft 2873 m	5,240 ft 1597 m	31.5 mi 50.6 km	45.3240°N 116.5406°W
10	Hyndman Peak	Pioneer Mountains	12,012 ft 3661.4 m	4,829 ft 1472 m	30.1 mi 48.5 km	43.7494°N 114.1311°W
11	White Mountain West	Salmon River Mountains	10,447 ft 3184 m	3,772 ft 1150 m	29.6 mi 47.6 km	44.5749°N 114.4959°W
12	South Selkirk Crest	Selkirk Mountains	7,719 ft 2353 m	3,375 ft 1029 m	29.5 mi 47.5 km	48.8455°N 116.5544°W
13	Castle Peak	White Cloud Mountains	11,812 ft 3600.4 m	4,035 ft 1230 m	27.3 mi 44 km	44.0402°N 114.5887°W
14	Oxford Peak	Bannock Range	9,285 ft 2830.2 m	4,012 ft 1223 m	26.6 mi 42.8 km	42.2696°N 112.0979°W
15	Lem Peak	Lemhi Range	10,990 ft 3349.8 m	2,485 ft 757 m	26.5 mi 42.7 km	44.7807°N 113.8664°W
16	Meade Peak	Preuss Range	9,963 ft 3036.8 m	2,497 ft 761 m	23.5 mi 37.7 km	42.4954°N 111.2490°W
17	Big Creek Peak	Lemhi Range	11,355 ft 3461.1 m	2,517 ft 767 m	22.4 mi 36.1 km	44.4717°N 113.5430°W
18	Black Pine Mountains high point	Black Pine Mountains	9,389 ft 2861.7 m	4,095 ft 1248 m	20.1 mi 32.3 km	42.1389°N 113.1259°W
19	Scott Peak	Beaverhead Mountains	11,398 ft 3474.2 m	4,243 ft 1293 m	19.56 mi 31.5 km	44.3536°N 112.8211°W
20	Deep Creek Peak	Deep Creek Mountains	8,752 ft 2667.7 m	3,248 ft 990 m	19.26 mi 31 km	42.4713°N 112.6560°W
21	Sedgwick Peak	Portneuf Range	9,176 ft 2796.8 m	3,642 ft 1110 m	19.19 mi 30.9 km	42.5157°N 111.9234°W
22	Scotchman Peak	Cabinet Mountains	7,017 ft 2138.7 m	4,669 ft 1423 m	17.99 mi 29 km	48.1891°N 116.0813°W
23	Thompson Peak	Sawtooth Range	10,756 ft 3278.4 m	2,451 ft 747 m	17.77 mi 28.6 km	44.1415°N 115.0100°W
24	Smoky Dome	Soldier Mountains	10,096 ft 3077.4 m	3,275 ft 998 m	16.98 mi 27.3 km	43.4933°N 114.9362°W
25	Goat Mountain	Beaverhead Mountains	9,948 ft 3032.2 m	2,283 ft 696 m	16.44 mi 26.5 km	44.8234°N 113.4388°W
26	The General	Salmon River Mountains	10,333 ft 3149.5 m	1,909 ft 582 m	16.42 mi 26.4 km	44.4836°N 114.8031°W
27	Bald Mountain	Salmon River Mountains	10,318 ft 3144.9 m	2,013 ft 614 m	16.18 mi 26 km	44.3672°N 114.3441°W
28	Sleeping Deer Mountain	Salmon River Mountains	9,887 ft 3013.6 m	1,861 ft 567 m	15.75 mi 25.3 km	44.7672°N 114.6913°W
29	Sturgill Peak	Hitt Mountains	7,593 ft 2314.3 m	3,449 ft 1051 m	13.06 mi 21 km	44.6200°N 116.9433°W
30	Ryan Peak	Boulder Mountains	11,720 ft 3572.2 m	3,214 ft 980 m	12.97 mi 20.9 km	43.9024°N 114.4096°W
31	Elkhorn Peak	Bannock Range	9,095 ft 2772.3 m	3,515 ft 1071 m	12.63 mi 20.3 km	42.3340°N 112.3285°W
32	Smiley Mountain	Pioneer Mountains	11,511 ft 3508.6 m	2,648 ft 807 m	11.28 mi 18.15 km	43.6994°N 113.8100°W
33	Mount Jefferson	Bitterroot Range	10,216 ft 3113.7 m	3,383 ft 1031 m	11.2 mi 18.02 km	44.5620°N 111.5049°W
34	Saddle Mountain	Lemhi Range	10,813 ft 3295.8 m	2,385 ft 727 m	11.18 mi 18 km	43.9374°N 112.9544°W
35	Shelly Mountain	White Knob Mountains	11,283 ft 3439.2 m	2,344 ft 714 m	9.71 mi 15.63 km	43.8265°N 113.7263°W
36	South Lost River Range high point	Lost River Range	11,086 ft 3379 m	3,444 ft 1050 m	9.33 mi 15.02 km	43.9291°N 113.3353°W
37	Taylor Mountain	Bitterroot Range	9,860 ft 3005.2 m	1,880 ft 573 m	8.79 mi 14.15 km	44.5616°N 111.6830°W
38	Sheep Mountain	Boulder Mountains	10,913 ft 3326.4 m	2,288 ft 697 m	8.72 mi 14.04 km	44.0646°N 114.3601°W
39	Queen Mountain	Purcell Mountains	6,116 ft 1864.2 m	3,252 ft 991 m	8.62 mi 13.87 km	48.8782°N 116.2150°W
40	Bell Mountain	Lemhi Range	11,617 ft 3540.9 m	1,752 ft 534 m	8.56 mi 13.77 km	44.2362°N 113.1939°W

== Gallery ==
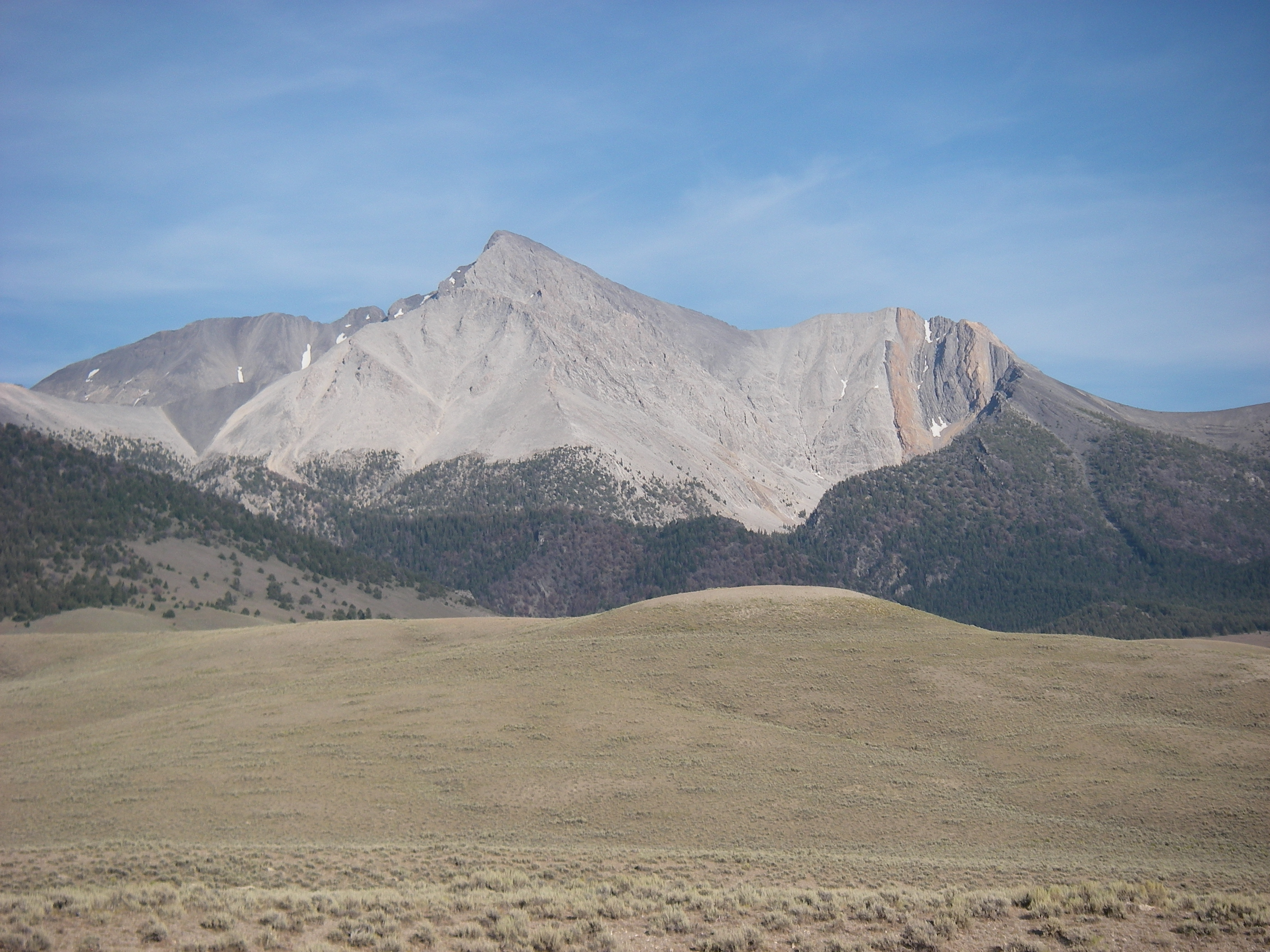
Borah Peak

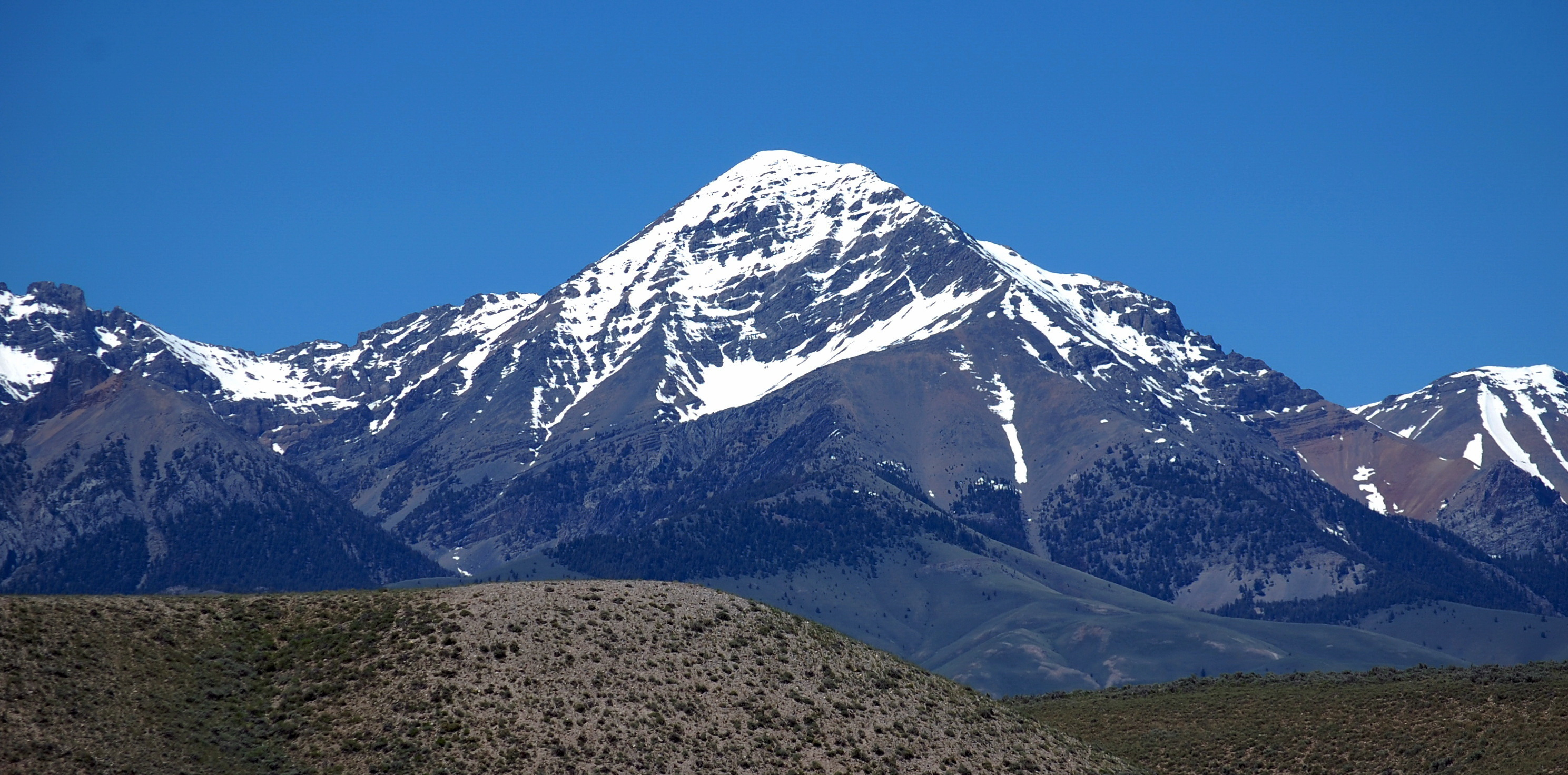
Diamond Peak

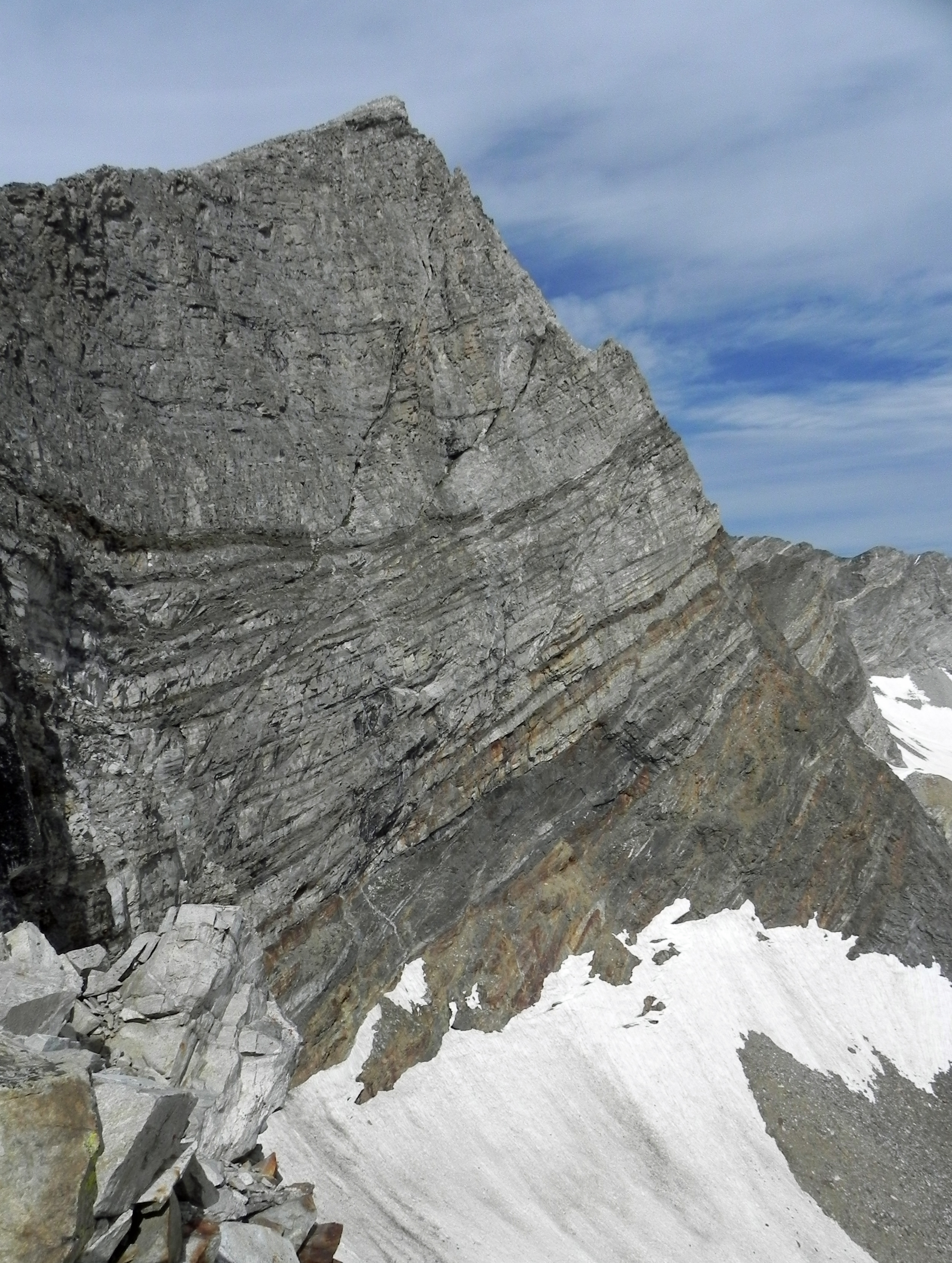
Hyndman Peak

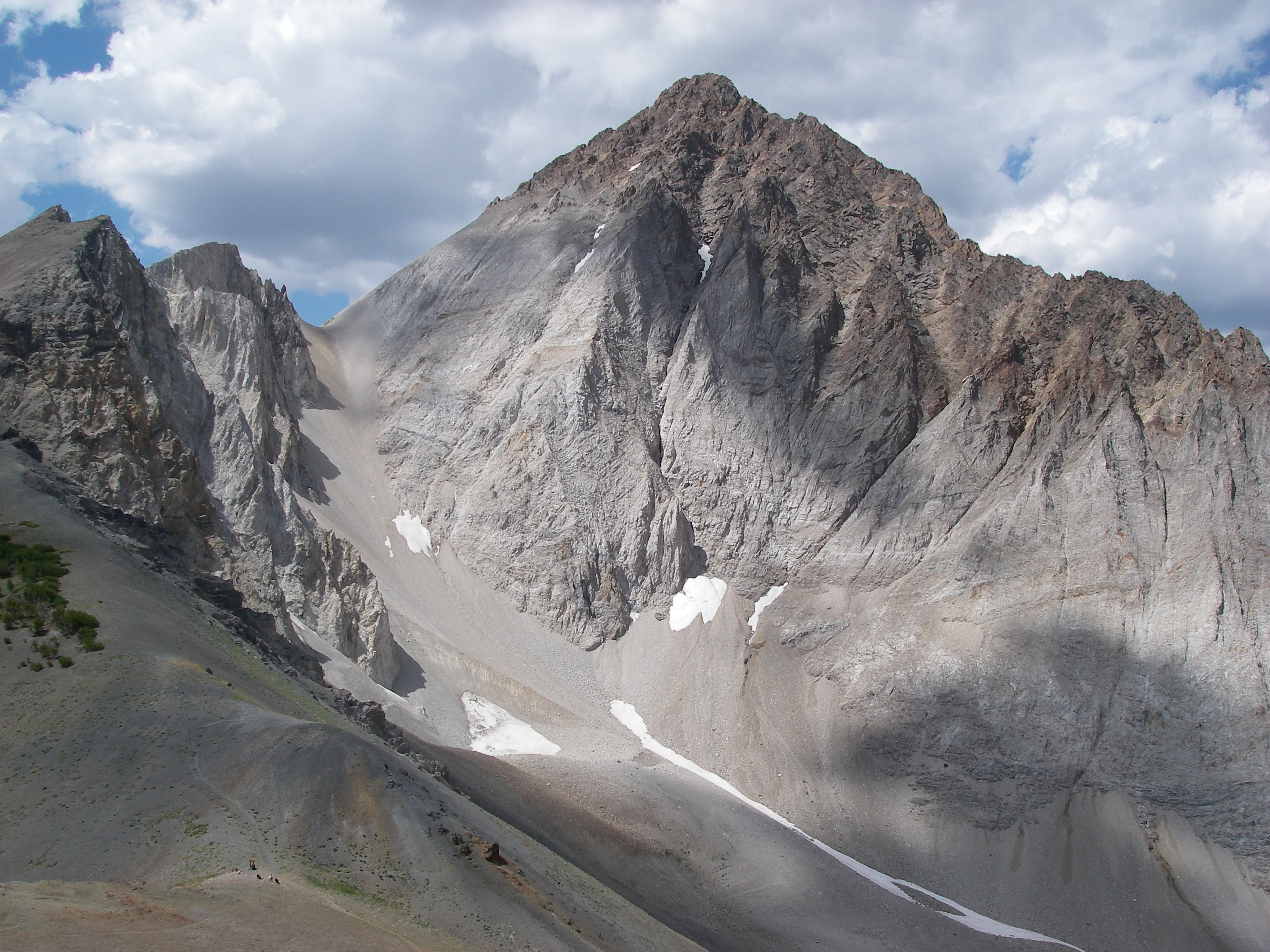
Castle Peak

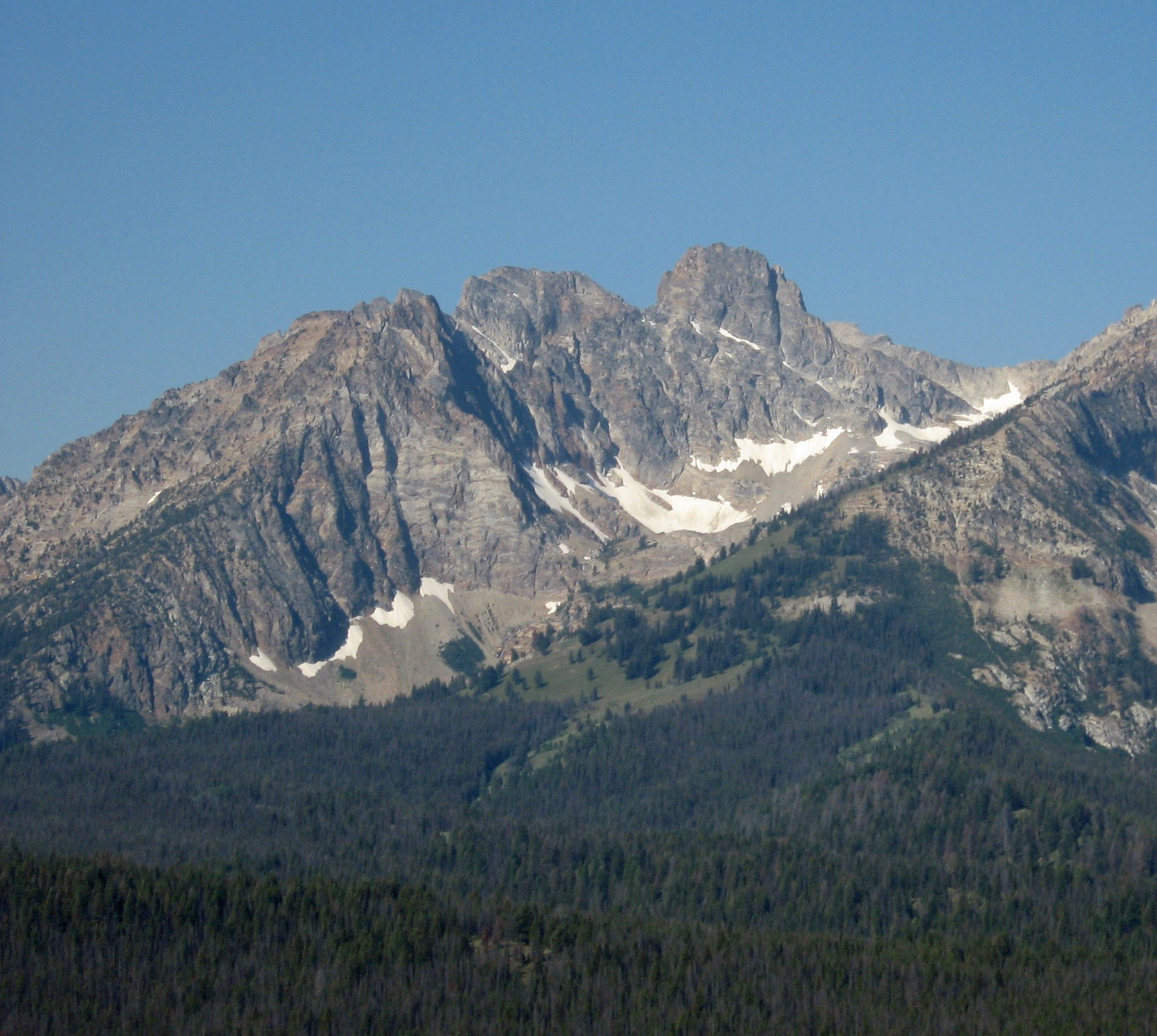
Thompson Peak

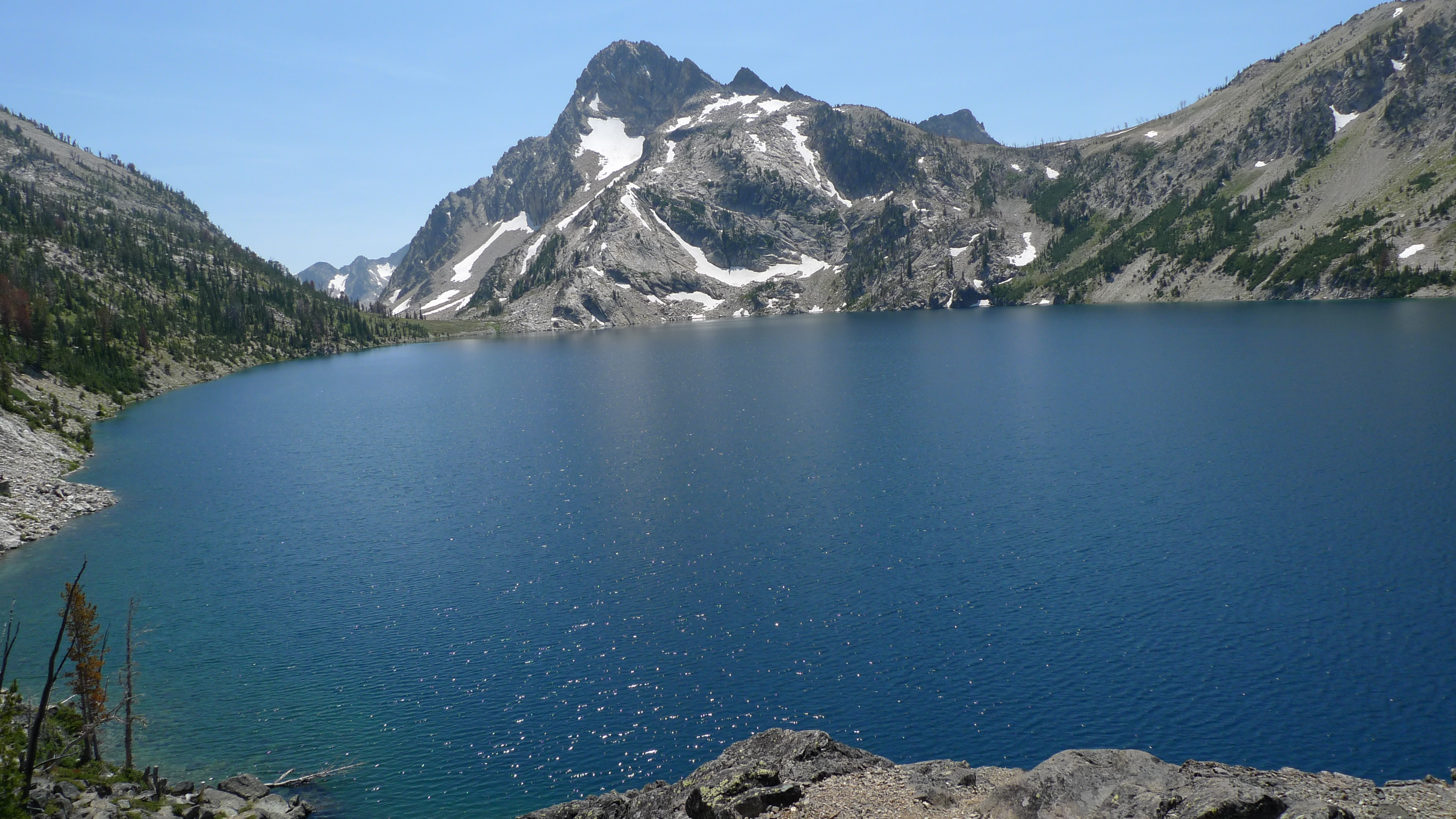
Mount Regan

== See also ==
- List of mountain peaks of North America
  - List of mountain peaks of Greenland
  - List of mountain peaks of Canada
  - List of mountain peaks of the Rocky Mountains
  - List of mountain peaks of the United States
    - List of mountain peaks of Alaska
    - List of mountain peaks of Arizona
    - List of mountain peaks of California
    - List of mountain peaks of Colorado
    - List of mountain peaks of Hawaiʻi
    - List of mountain peaks of Idaho
      - List of mountains of Idaho
      - List of mountain ranges of Idaho
    - List of mountain peaks of Montana
    - List of mountain peaks of Nevada
    - List of mountain peaks of Oregon
    - List of mountain peaks of Utah
    - List of mountain peaks of Washington (state)
    - List of mountain peaks of Wyoming
  - List of mountain peaks of México
  - List of mountain peaks of Central America
  - List of mountain peaks of the Caribbean
- Idaho
  - Geography of Idaho
    - Category:Mountains of Idaho
      - commons:Category:Mountains of Idaho
- Physical geography
  - Topography
    - Topographic elevation
    - Topographic prominence
    - Topographic isolation
