= Red Rock Pass =

Mountain pass in Idaho, United States

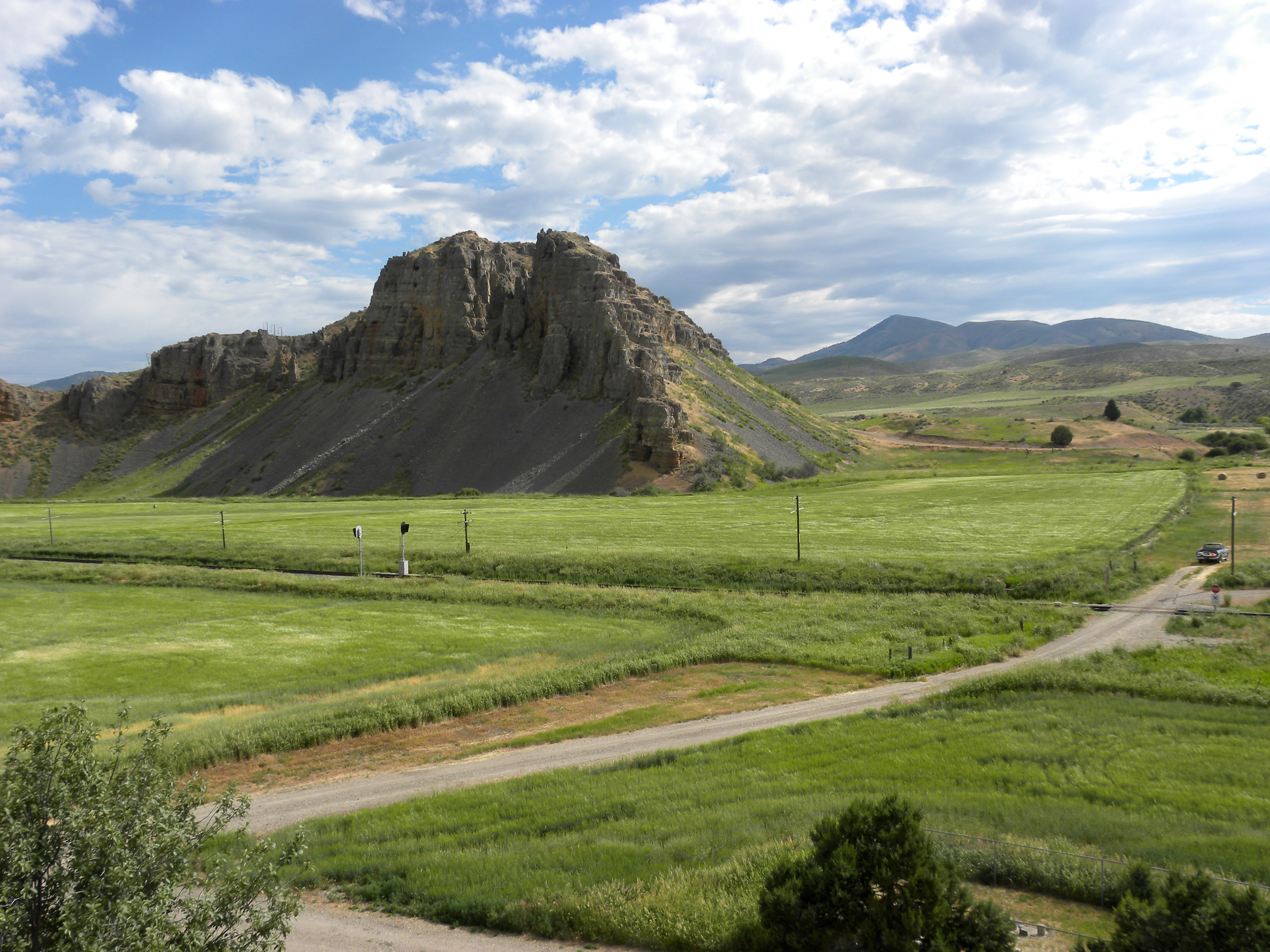
- Red Rock Pass

- Location within the United States Location within Idaho
- Elevation: 4,785 ft (1,458 m)
- Traversed by: US 91

Location
- Location: Bannock County, Idaho, U.S.
- Range: Portneuf Range; Bannock Range; Rocky Mountains
- Coordinates: 42°21′20″N 112°2′40″W

Red Rock Pass is a low mountain pass in the Western United States in southeastern Idaho, located in southern Bannock County, south of Downey. It is geologically significant as the spillway of ancient Lake Bonneville. It is traversed by U.S. Route 91 at an elevation of 4,785 feet (1,458 m) above sea level, bounded by two mountain ranges; the Portneuf to the east and the Bannock to the west.

The pass was cut through resistant Paleozoic shale, limestone, and dolomite, and forms a narrow gap two miles (3 km) in length. At one time the pass was 300 feet (90 m) higher, where the shoreline of Pleistocene Lake Bonneville stood.

The pass takes its name from the red limestone cliffs which border it. Red Rock Pass has a surface deposit of calcareous silty alluvium with topsoil of dark grayish brown silt loam.

== Bonneville flood ==
It is believed that during the last ice age, lava flows in the vicinity of Pocatello began to divert the Bear River through Lake Thatcher and then into Lake Bonneville. This sudden influx caused Bonneville to overflow at Red Rock about 14,500 years ago. This overflow caused a sudden erosion of unconsolidated material on the northern shoreline near Red Rock Pass. As the material gave way, Marsh Creek Valley, immediately downstream, was flooded from wall to wall, and the rapid discharge eroded the pass to its present level. The flood then flowed into the Snake River Plain, generally following the path of the present-day Snake River to its outlet in the Pacific Northwest.

The Bonneville flood, as it is known, was a catastrophic event. The maximum discharge was about 15 million cubic feet per second (420,000 m³/s) or about three times the average flow of the Amazon River. The speed of flow was approximately 16 miles per hour (7.2 m/s), and though peak flow lasted only a few days, voluminous discharges may have continued for at least a year.
