= Lem Peak =

Mountain in Idaho, United States

- Location within Idaho

Highest point
- Elevation: 3,349.8 m (10,990 ft)
- Prominence: 751 m (2,464 ft)
- Parent peak: Big Creek Peak
- Isolation: 42.65 km (26.50 mi)
- Coordinates: 44.7804°N 113.8664°W

Geography
- Location: Lemhi County, Idaho
- Parent range: Lemhi Range

Lem Peak is a mountain in Lemhi County, Idaho. At 3349m, it is the 16th highest summit in Idaho that has at least 500m of topographic prominence.

== Climate ==
Climate data for Lem Peak 44.7667 N, 113.8610 W, Elevation: 10,220 ft (3,120 m) (1991–2020 normals)
Month	Jan	Feb	Mar	Apr	May	Jun	Jul	Aug	Sep	Oct	Nov	Dec	Year
Mean daily maximum °F (°C)	22.4 (−5.3)	22.1 (−5.5)	27.4 (−2.6)	33.3 (0.7)	42.4 (5.8)	51.8 (11.0)	64.1 (17.8)	63.5 (17.5)	53.7 (12.1)	39.9 (4.4)	27.2 (−2.7)	21.3 (−5.9)	39.1 (3.9)
Daily mean °F (°C)	15.3 (−9.3)	13.9 (−10.1)	17.9 (−7.8)	22.6 (−5.2)	31.0 (−0.6)	39.8 (4.3)	50.7 (10.4)	50.1 (10.1)	41.2 (5.1)	29.5 (−1.4)	19.9 (−6.7)	14.3 (−9.8)	28.9 (−1.7)
Mean daily minimum °F (°C)	8.2 (−13.2)	5.8 (−14.6)	8.5 (−13.1)	11.9 (−11.2)	19.6 (−6.9)	27.9 (−2.3)	37.2 (2.9)	36.7 (2.6)	28.7 (−1.8)	19.1 (−7.2)	12.5 (−10.8)	7.4 (−13.7)	18.6 (−7.4)
Average precipitation inches (mm)	3.07 (78)	2.66 (68)	3.63 (92)	4.52 (115)	4.60 (117)	4.13 (105)	1.34 (34)	1.41 (36)	3.06 (78)	3.30 (84)	3.22 (82)	3.32 (84)	38.26 (973)
Source: PRISM Climate Group
