= The General (Idaho) =

Mountain in Idaho, United States

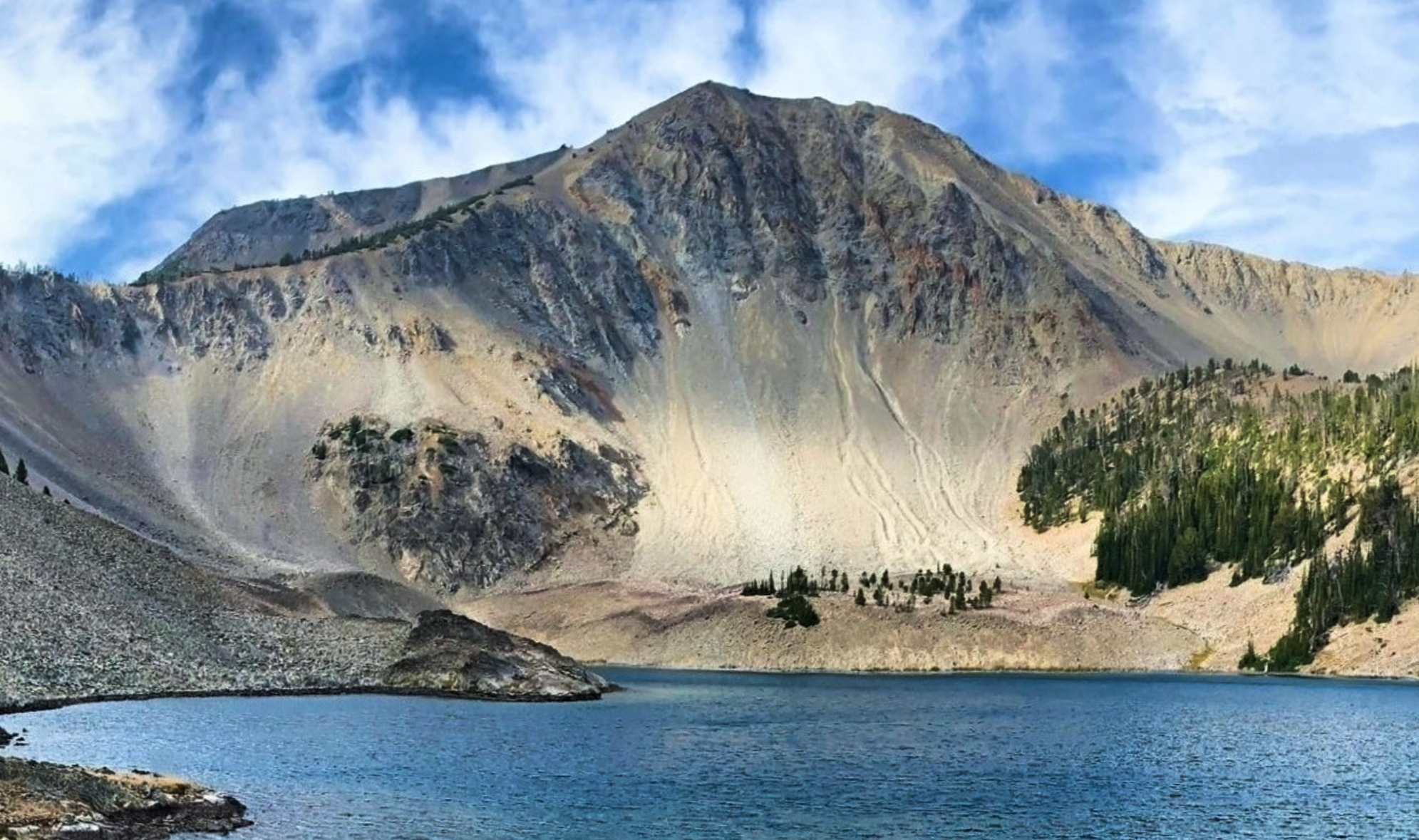
- Northeast aspect

Highest point
- Elevation: 10,329 ft (3,148 m)
- Prominence: 1,909 ft (582 m)
- Parent peak: White Mountain (10,442 ft)
- Isolation: 16.40 mi (26.39 km)
- Listing: Mountain peaks of Idaho
- Coordinates: 44°29′00″N 114°48′10″W

Geography
- Location within Idaho Location within the United States
- Country: United States
- State: Idaho
- County: Custer
- Protected area: Frank Church–River of No Return Wilderness
- Parent range: Salmon River Mountains; Rocky Mountains
- Topo map: USGS Mount Jordan

Climbing
- Easiest route: class 2

The General is a 10,329-foot elevation (3,148 m) mountain summit in Custer County, Idaho, United States.

== Description ==
The General is part of the Salmon River Mountains which are a subrange of the Rocky Mountains. The mountain is located 17 miles (27 km) north-northeast of Stanley, Idaho, on the boundary line of the Frank Church–River of No Return Wilderness on land managed by Salmon–Challis National Forest. The peak ranks as the second-highest peak in the Salmon River Mountains and third-highest in the wilderness. Precipitation runoff from the mountain's slopes drains into tributaries of the Salmon River. Topographic relief is significant as the summit rises 1,930 feet (590 meters) above Lightning Creek in 0.85 mile (1.37 km) and 1,259 feet (384 meters) above Mystery Lake in 0.38 mile (0.61 km).

== Climate ==
Based on the Köppen climate classification, The General is located in an alpine subarctic climate zone with long, cold, snowy winters, and cool to warm summers. Winter temperatures can drop below −10 °F with wind chill factors below −30 °F.

== See also ==
- List of mountain peaks of Idaho
