= Scotchman Peak =

Mountain in Idaho, United States

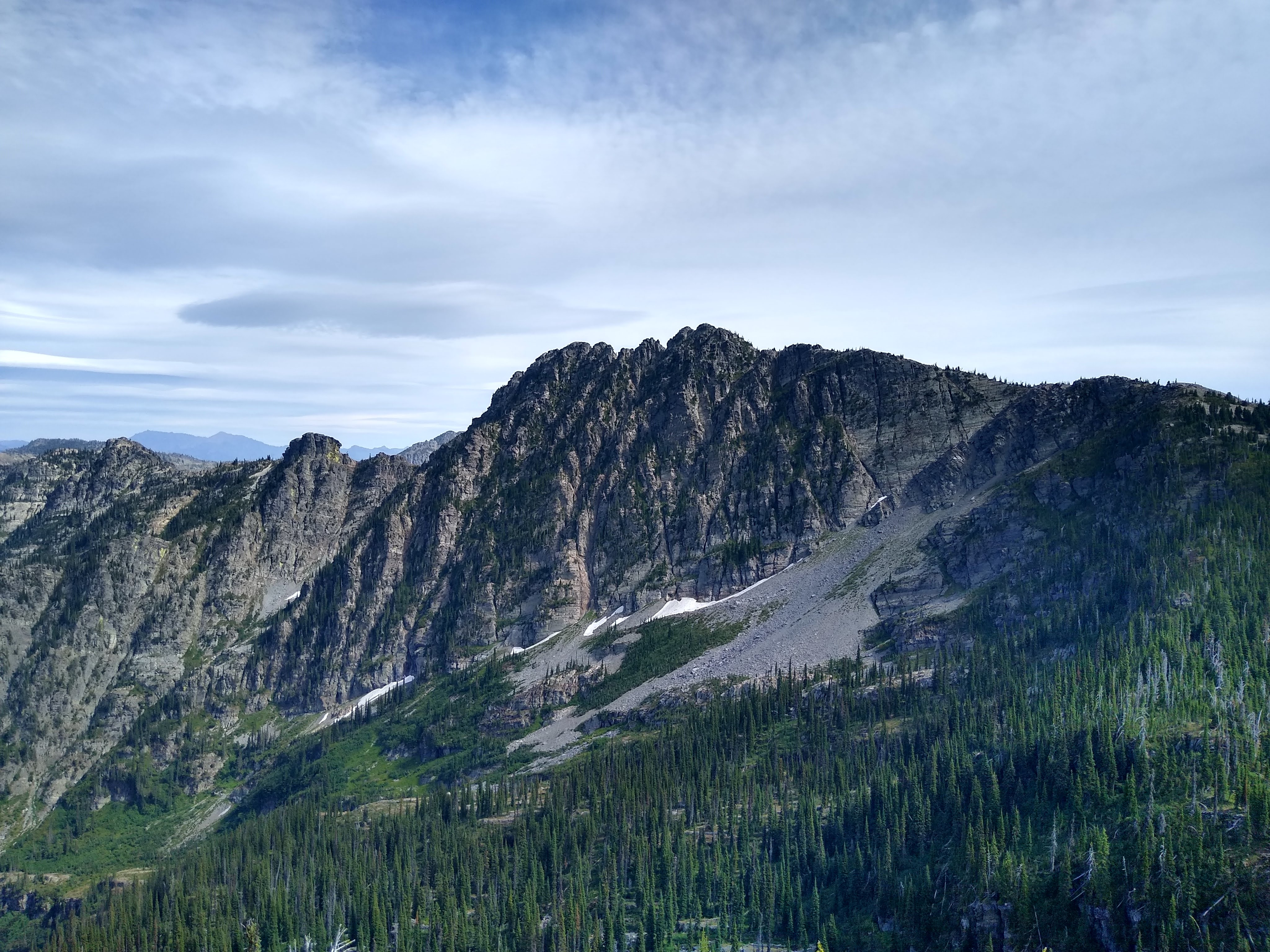
- West aspect

Highest point
- Elevation: 7,018 ft (2,139 m)
- Prominence: 4,665 ft (1,422 m)
- Parent peak: A Peak (8,634 ft)
- Isolation: 15.2 mi (24.5 km)
- Listing: Mountain peaks of Idaho
- Coordinates: 48°11′20″N 116°04′53″W

Geography
- Location within Idaho Location within the United States
- Country: United States
- State: Idaho
- County: Bonner
- Protected area: Kaniksu National Forest
- Parent range: Cabinet Mountains; Rocky Mountains
- Topo map: USGS Scotchman Peak

Geology
- Rock age: Middle Proterozoic
- Mountain type: Fault block
- Rock type(s): Argillite, Quartzite

Climbing
- Easiest route: class 2

Scotchman Peak is a 7,018-foot-elevation (2,139 m) mountain summit in Bonner County, Idaho, United States.

== Description ==
Scotchman Peak is part of the Cabinet Mountains which are a subrange of the Rocky Mountains. The peak ranks as the highest point in Bonner County, and fifth in topographic prominence in the state. The mountain is situated five miles (8.0 km) northeast of Clark Fork, Idaho, on land managed by Idaho Panhandle National Forests. The mountain is within the proposed Scotchman Peaks Wilderness Area. Precipitation runoff from the mountain's slopes drains to Lake Pend Oreille. Topographic relief is significant as the summit rises 3,000 feet (914 meters) above West Fork Blue Creek in 1.5 miles (2.4 km). Access to the summit is via the popular Scotchman Peak Trail which gains 3,700 feet (1,128 m) of elevation as it climbs 4.2 miles (6.8 km), with the summit providing views of Lake Pend Oreille and the Clark Fork River Valley. A fire lookout stood on the mountain from the 1920s to the 1950s. This landform's toponym has been officially adopted by the United States Board on Geographic Names.

== Climate ==
Based on the Köppen climate classification, Scotchman Peak is located in an alpine subarctic climate zone with long, cold, snowy winters, and cool to warm summers. Winter temperatures can drop below 0 °F with wind chill factors below −10 °F.

== See also ==
- List of mountain peaks of Idaho

== Gallery ==
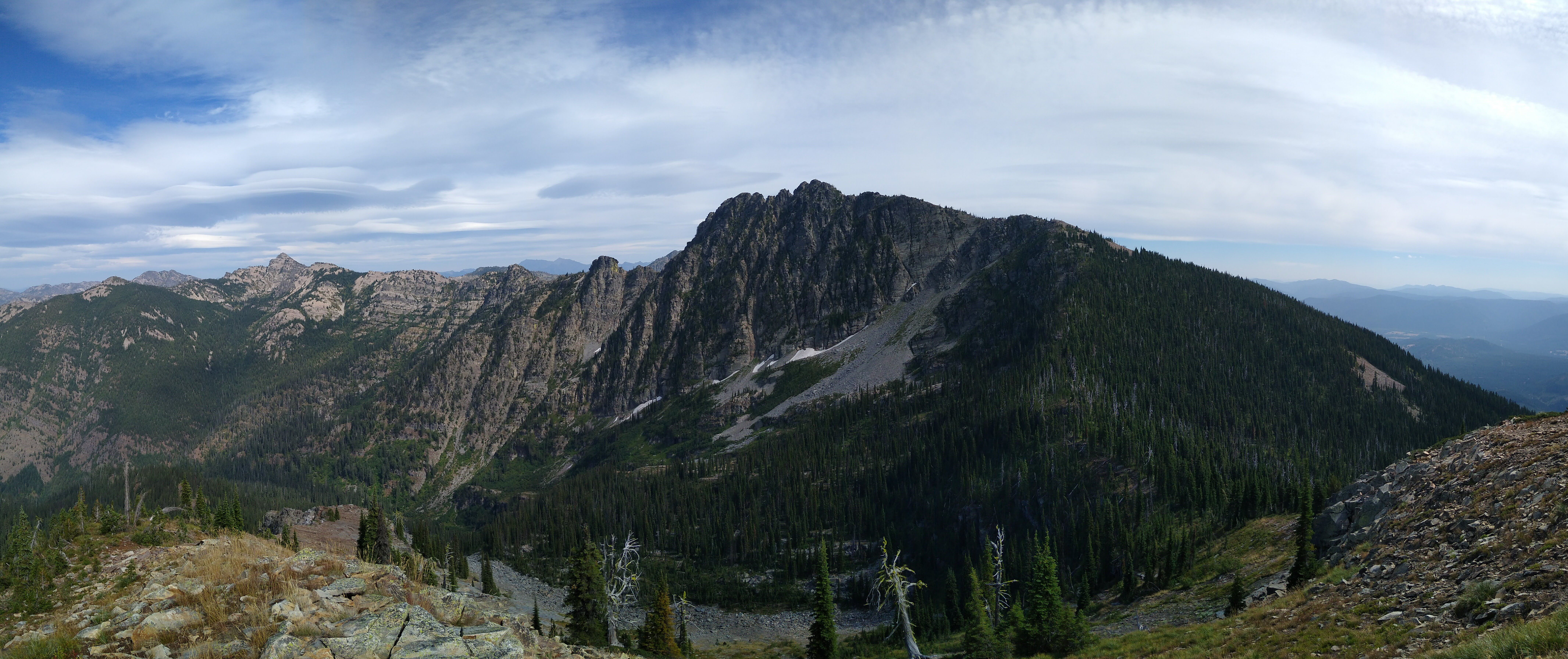
Scotchman Peak viewed from Goat Mountain

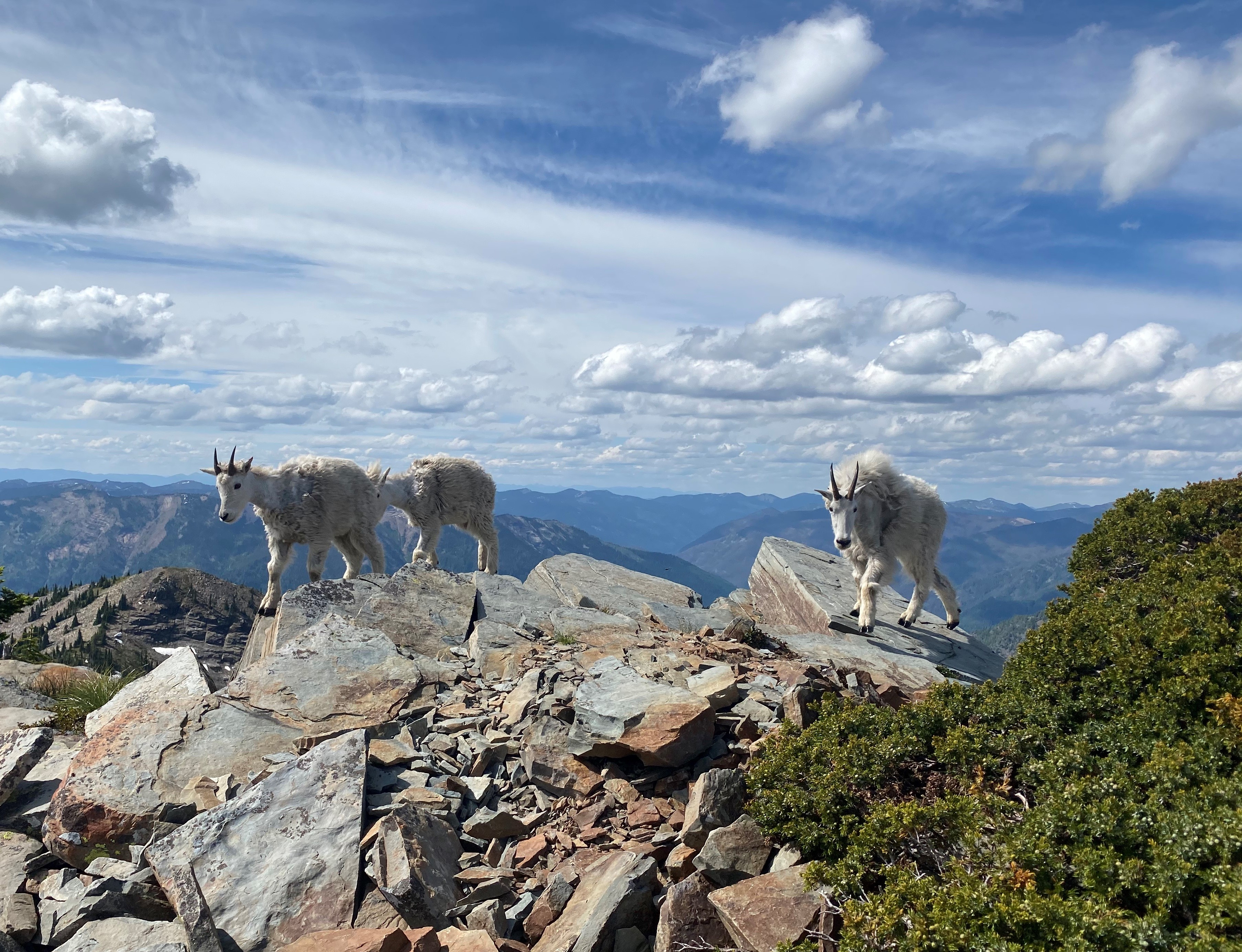
Mountain goats on Scotchman Peak

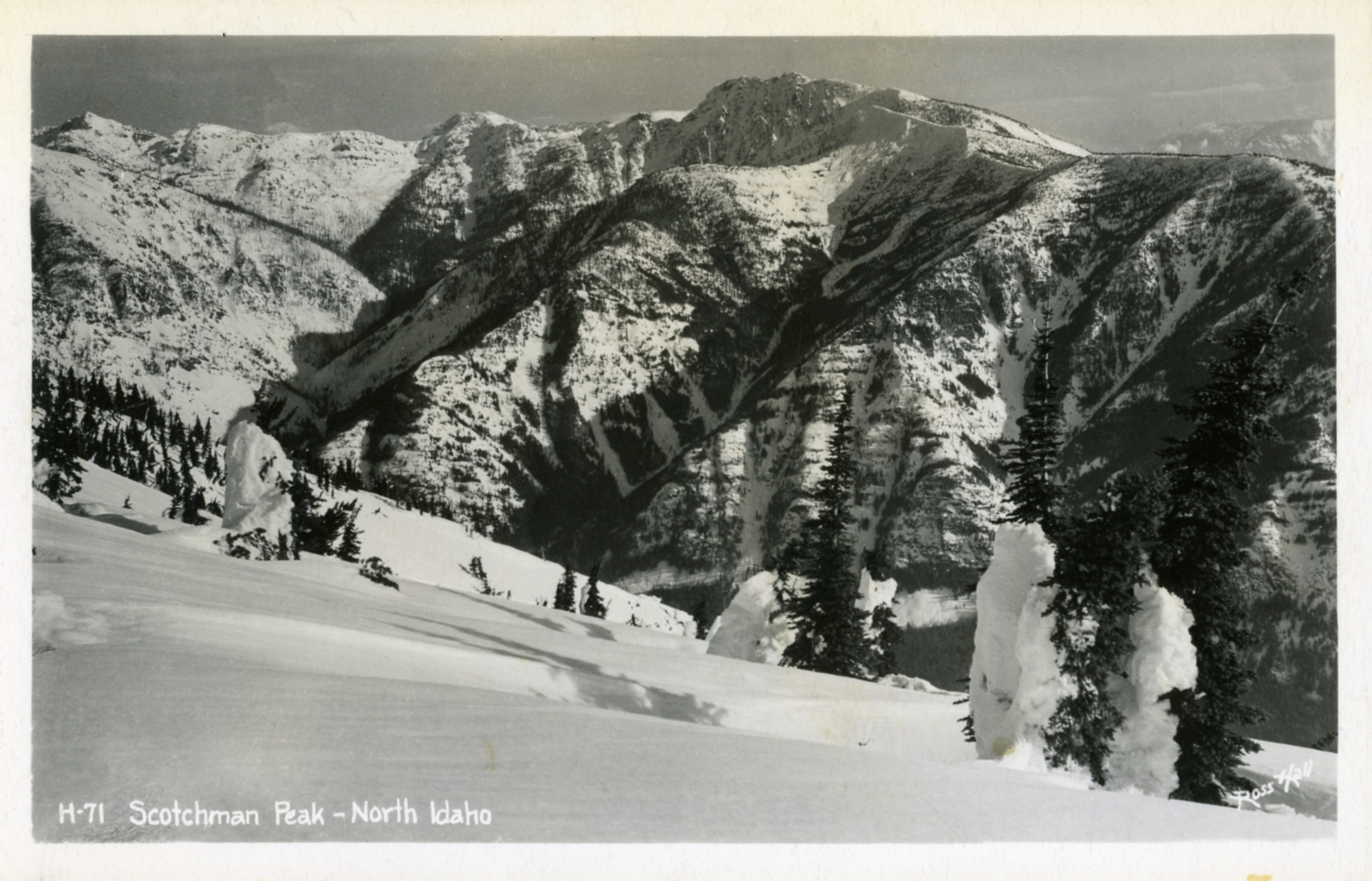
1940 postcard of Scotchman Peak
