= Saddle Mountain (Idaho) =

Mountain in Butte County, Idaho, United States

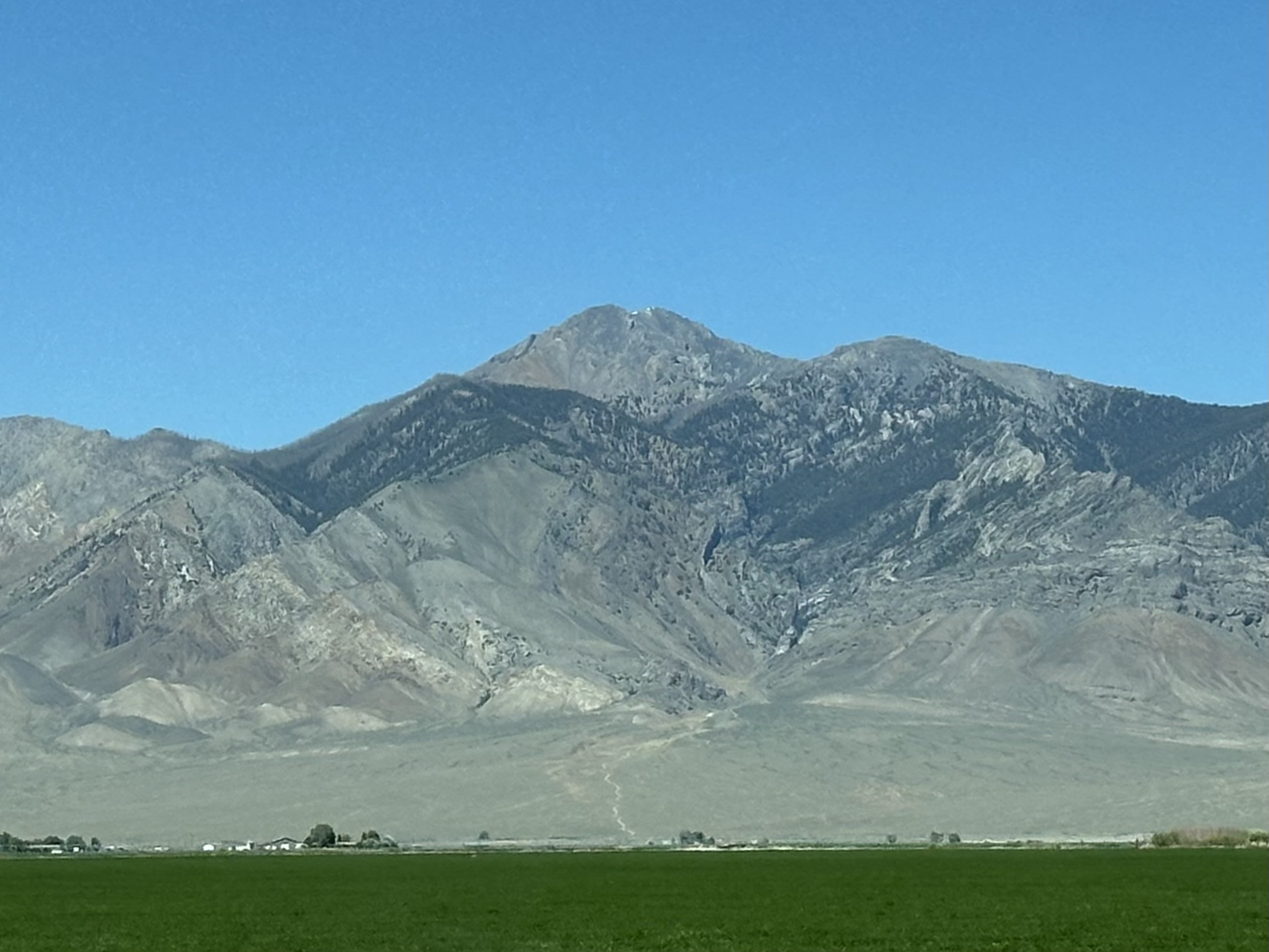

Highest point
- Elevation: 3,295.8 m (10,813 ft)
- Prominence: 727 m (2,385 ft)
- Parent peak: Little Diamond Peak
- Isolation: 15.63 km (9.71 mi)
- Coordinates: 43.9374°N 112.9547°W

Geography
- Location within Idaho
- Location: Butte County, Idaho
- Parent range: Lemhi Range

Saddle Mountain is a mountain in Butte County, Idaho, located in the Lemhi Range. At 3296m, it is the 18th tallest peak in Idaho with at least 500m of topographical prominence.
