= Glassford Peak =

Mountain in the state of Idaho

- Location within Idaho

Highest point
- Elevation: 11,602 ft (3,536 m)
- Prominence: 1,762 ft (537 m)
- Listing: Mountain peaks of Idaho
- Coordinates: 43°54′44″N 114°28′53″W

Geography
- Location: Custer County, Idaho, U.S.
- Parent range: Boulder Mountains
- Topo map: USGS Ryan Peak

Climbing
- Easiest route: Simple scramble, class 2

Glassford Peak, at 11,602 feet (3,536 m) above sea level is the third highest peak in the Boulder Mountains of Idaho. Located in the Hemingway–Boulders Wilderness of Sawtooth National Recreation Area and Custer County, Glassford Peak is about 0.55 miles (890 m) north of the Blaine County border. It is the 39th highest peak in Idaho.

The peak is most easily accessed from south of Idaho State Highway 75 between Stanley and Challis. However, it can also be accessed from State Highway 75 north of Ketchum.
