= Scott Peak (Idaho) =

Mountain in Idaho, United States

- Location within Idaho

Highest point
- Elevation: 11,378 ft (3,468 m)
- Prominence: 4,233 ft (1,290 m)
- Isolation: 19.28 mi (31.03 km)
- Coordinates: 44°21′13″N 112°49′18″W

Geography
- Location: Lemhi County, Idaho
- Parent range: Beaverhead Mountains
- Topo map: USGS Scott Peak O44112c7

Scott Peak is an 11,378-foot (3,468 m) summit in the Caribou-Targhee National Forest, in Lemhi County, Idaho in the United States. It is the highest point of the Beaverhead Mountains, and is located in the "Italian Peaks" section of the range. Scott peak is located about 20 miles (32 km) west-northwest of Dubois, Idaho.

== Climate ==
Climate data for Scott Peak 44.3431 N, 112.8049 W, Elevation: 10,699 ft (3,261 m) (1991–2020 normals)
Month	Jan	Feb	Mar	Apr	May	Jun	Jul	Aug	Sep	Oct	Nov	Dec	Year
Mean daily maximum °F (°C)	20.5 (−6.4)	20.4 (−6.4)	26.4 (−3.1)	31.5 (−0.3)	40.9 (4.9)	50.7 (10.4)	62.3 (16.8)	61.9 (16.6)	52.4 (11.3)	38.9 (3.8)	25.6 (−3.6)	19.4 (−7.0)	37.6 (3.1)
Daily mean °F (°C)	13.6 (−10.2)	12.5 (−10.8)	17.0 (−8.3)	21.5 (−5.8)	30.4 (−0.9)	39.3 (4.1)	49.7 (9.8)	49.2 (9.6)	39.9 (4.4)	28.4 (−2.0)	18.3 (−7.6)	12.7 (−10.7)	27.7 (−2.4)
Mean daily minimum °F (°C)	6.7 (−14.1)	4.7 (−15.2)	7.5 (−13.6)	11.4 (−11.4)	19.8 (−6.8)	28.0 (−2.2)	37.0 (2.8)	36.5 (2.5)	27.3 (−2.6)	17.9 (−7.8)	11.0 (−11.7)	5.9 (−14.5)	17.8 (−7.9)
Average precipitation inches (mm)	1.90 (48)	1.97 (50)	2.53 (64)	3.41 (87)	3.78 (96)	3.32 (84)	1.37 (35)	1.48 (38)	1.72 (44)	2.39 (61)	2.05 (52)	2.13 (54)	28.05 (713)
Source: PRISM Climate Group

== See also ==
- List of mountain peaks of Idaho
