= List of mountain ranges in Idaho =

There are at least 115 named mountain ranges in Idaho. Some of these ranges extend into the neighboring states of Montana, Nevada, Oregon, Utah, Washington, and Wyoming. Names, elevations and coordinates from the U.S. Geological Survey, Geographic Names Information System.

== The List ==
Name	County, State	Elevation	Coordinates	Ref
Albion Mountains	Cassia County, Idaho	7,470 feet (2,280 m)	42°13′48″N 113°43′05″W	
Arco Hills	Butte County, Idaho	7,310 feet (2,230 m)	43°39′43″N 113°09′27″W	
Aspen Range	Caribou County, Idaho	7,831 feet (2,387 m)	42°40′51″N 111°28′18″W	
Bally Mountains	Box Elder County, Utah	8,051 feet (2,454 m)	41°57′49″N 113°28′25″W	
Bannock Range	Bannock County, Idaho	7,018 feet (2,139 m)	42°25′00″N 112°17′03″W	
Bear River Range	Bear Lake County, Idaho	8,356 feet (2,547 m)	42°09′17″N 111°36′15″W	
Bear River Range	Cache County, Utah	6,404 feet (1,952 m)	41°38′00″N 111°40′03″W	
Beaverhead Mountains	Lemhi County, Idaho	11,352 feet (3,460 m)	44°21′17″N 112°49′21″W	
Big Hole Mountains	Teton County, Idaho	8,655 feet (2,638 m)	43°41′35″N 111°19′51″W	
Bighorn Crags	Lemhi County, Idaho	9,642 feet (2,939 m)	45°10′24″N 114°34′59″W	
Bitterroot Mountains	Clearwater County, Idaho	3,845 feet (1,172 m)	47°28′00″N 115°42′04″W	
Bitterroot Range	Clearwater County, Idaho	7,126 feet (2,172 m)	46°44′08″N 115°24′27″W	
Black Butte Hills	Lincoln County, Idaho	4,531 feet (1,381 m)	43°05′37″N 114°27′01″W	
Black Pine Mountains	Cassia County, Idaho	8,586 feet (2,617 m)	42°07′54″N 113°07′11″W	
Blackfoot Mountains	Bingham County, Idaho	6,808 feet (2,075 m)	43°10′58″N 111°50′27″W	
Boise Mountains	Boise County, Idaho	5,787 feet (1,764 m)	43°45′01″N 115°30′04″W	
Boulder Mountains	Custer County, Idaho	11,699 feet (3,566 m)	43°54′08″N 114°24′33″W	
Buck Creek Mountains	Elko County, Nevada	6,791 feet (2,070 m)	41°55′23″N 115°35′06″W	
Cabinet Mountains	Sanders County, Montana	4,058 feet (1,237 m)	48°10′00″N 115°50′04″W	
Caribou Range	Caribou County, Idaho	8,202 feet (2,500 m)	42°55′14″N 111°10′54″W	
Castle Rocks	Cassia County, Idaho	6,758 feet (2,060 m)	42°08′20″N 113°40′44″W	
Cedar Hills	Cassia County, Idaho	6,594 feet (2,010 m)	42°00′42″N 113°41′49″W	
Centennial Mountains	Clark County, Idaho	10,180 feet (3,100 m)	44°33′44″N 111°30′17″W	
Chalk Hills	Canyon County, Idaho	2,556 feet (779 m)	43°36′29″N 116°48′47″W	
Chesterfield Range	Caribou County, Idaho	6,959 feet (2,121 m)	42°49′52″N 111°44′47″W	
Clearwater Mountains	Idaho County, Idaho	4,895 feet (1,492 m)	45°36′02″N 115°11′03″W	
Coeur d'Alene Mountains	Sanders County, Montana	3,497 feet (1,066 m)	47°45′00″N 116°00′04″W	
Cold Springs Mountains	Idaho County, Idaho	6,926 feet (2,111 m)	45°30′04″N 116°27′05″W	
Cotterel Mountains	Cassia County, Idaho	6,092 feet (1,857 m)	42°26′20″N 113°28′22″W	
Cuddy Mountains	Washington County, Idaho	7,566 feet (2,306 m)	44°49′23″N 116°43′56″W	
Danskin Mountains	Elmore County, Idaho	4,987 feet (1,520 m)	43°24′39″N 115°41′36″W	
Deep Creek Mountains	Power County, Idaho	8,412 feet (2,564 m)	42°26′35″N 112°42′59″W	
Donkey Hills	Custer County, Idaho	9,377 feet (2,858 m)	44°13′26″N 113°30′28″W	
East Hills	Cassia County, Idaho	5,804 feet (1,769 m)	42°29′04″N 113°33′55″W	
Eastern Centennial Mountains	Clark County, Idaho	10,180 feet (3,100 m)	44°33′44″N 111°30′17″W	
Elk Mountains	Elko County, Nevada	7,398 feet (2,255 m)	41°56′12″N 115°03′34″W	
Fish Creek Range	Caribou County, Idaho	6,460 feet (1,970 m)	42°37′11″N 111°55′17″W	
Fox Hills	Caribou County, Idaho	7,011 feet (2,137 m)	42°48′46″N 111°28′24″W	
Gannett Hills	Lincoln County, Wyoming	7,907 feet (2,410 m)	42°33′36″N 111°04′14″W	
Goose Creek Mountains	Elko County, Nevada	6,102 feet (1,860 m)	41°37′35″N 114°07′28″W	
Grass Mountains	Idaho County, Idaho	8,067 feet (2,459 m)	45°10′39″N 116°11′43″W	
Grassy Hills	Owyhee County, Idaho	5,853 feet (1,784 m)	42°11′26″N 115°06′02″W	
Grays Range	Caribou County, Idaho	7,428 feet (2,264 m)	42°57′04″N 111°25′35″W	
Hawley Mountains	Butte County, Idaho	7,910 feet (2,410 m)	44°05′07″N 113°18′30″W	
Henrys Lake Mountains	Madison County, Montana	10,148 feet (3,093 m)	44°46′52″N 111°24′00″W	
High Breaks	Idaho County, Idaho	4,767 feet (1,453 m)	45°52′12″N 116°31′26″W	
Hitt Mountains	Washington County, Idaho	6,329 feet (1,929 m)	44°35′16″N 117°00′45″W	
Hitt Mountains	Washington County, Idaho	6,752 feet (2,058 m)	44°35′51″N 116°54′00″W	
Hoodoo Mountains	Latah County, Idaho	4,816 feet (1,468 m)	47°01′59″N 116°29′13″W	
Jim Sage Mountains	Cassia County, Idaho	8,025 feet (2,446 m)	42°11′03″N 113°29′40″W	
Lake Hills	Blaine County, Idaho	6,614 feet (2,016 m)	43°24′27″N 113°57′23″W	
Lemhi Range	Lemhi County, Idaho	9,442 feet (2,878 m)	44°37′30″N 113°37′17″W	
Lewisville Knolls	Jefferson County, Idaho	4,918 feet (1,499 m)	43°41′04″N 112°02′53″W	
Little Goat Mountains	Shoshone County, Idaho	6,043 feet (1,842 m)	46°58′43″N 115°48′39″W	
Little Valley Hills	Bonneville County, Idaho	7,424 feet (2,263 m)	43°03′30″N 111°33′03″W	
Lost River Range	Butte County, Idaho	8,783 feet (2,677 m)	43°59′18″N 113°23′19″W	
Malad Range	Oneida County, Idaho	6,831 feet (2,082 m)	42°03′11″N 112°08′34″W	
Middle Mountain	Cassia County, Idaho	7,014 feet (2,138 m)	42°03′07″N 113°50′23″W	
Moose Mountains	Clearwater County, Idaho	6,735 feet (2,053 m)	46°45′32″N 115°11′57″W	
Mount Bennett Hills	Camas County, Idaho	6,102 feet (1,860 m)	43°13′11″N 115°05′29″W	
Ninety Percent Range	Caribou County, Idaho	6,808 feet (2,075 m)	42°42′29″N 111°39′17″W	
North Fork Range	Valley County, Idaho	6,243 feet (1,903 m)	44°09′39″N 116°03′07″W	
North Hansel Mountains	Box Elder County, Utah	5,259 feet (1,603 m)	41°54′35″N 112°31′33″W	
North Hansel Mountains	Oneida County, Idaho	6,975 feet (2,126 m)	42°04′17″N 112°35′35″W	
North Junipers	Fremont County, Idaho	5,945 feet (1,812 m)	44°03′08″N 111°52′23″W	
Owyhee Mountains	Owyhee County, Idaho	8,386 feet (2,556 m)	42°58′51″N 116°39′31″W	
Pahsimeroi Mountains	Custer County, Idaho	8,258 feet (2,517 m)	44°27′27″N 114°01′47″W	
Palouse Range	Latah County, Idaho	4,728 feet (1,441 m)	46°48′16″N 116°51′13″W	
Paradise Hills	Bingham County, Idaho	7,001 feet (2,134 m)	43°04′29″N 111°45′14″W	
Picabo Hills	Blaine County, Idaho	6,211 feet (1,893 m)	43°16′29″N 114°08′35″W	
Pioneer Mountains	Blaine County, Idaho	11,939 feet (3,639 m)	43°44′57″N 114°07′51″W	
Pleasantview Hills	Oneida County, Idaho	6,378 feet (1,944 m)	42°17′05″N 112°28′37″W	
Pocatello Range	Bannock County, Idaho	6,621 feet (2,018 m)	42°55′47″N 112°18′47″W	
Pole Creek Breaks	Owyhee County, Idaho	5,814 feet (1,772 m)	42°29′43″N 116°59′24″W	
Portneuf Range	Bannock County, Idaho	7,851 feet (2,393 m)	42°48′57″N 112°08′32″W	
Preuss Range	Caribou County, Idaho	7,329 feet (2,234 m)	42°18′03″N 111°10′52″W	
Purcell Mountains	Lincoln County, Montana	7,707 feet (2,349 m)	48°57′48″N 115°58′06″W	
Red Hills	Lemhi County, Idaho	7,572 feet (2,308 m)	44°09′55″N 113°25′45″W	
Salmon River Mountains	Custer County, Idaho	6,975 feet (2,126 m)	44°39′21″N 114°12′10″W	
Salmon River Range	Elko County, Nevada	7,113 feet (2,168 m)	41°50′36″N 114°50′09″W	
Samaria Mountains	Oneida County, Idaho	7,605 feet (2,318 m)	42°03′31″N 112°20′45″W	
Sand Hills	Bonneville County, Idaho	4,715 feet (1,437 m)	43°25′02″N 112°01′22″W	
Sawtooth Range	Blaine County, Idaho	9,767 feet (2,977 m)	43°57′12″N 114°59′26″W	
Secesh-Warren Area Mountains	Idaho County, Idaho	8,752 feet (2,668 m)	45°15′01″N 115°46′01″W	
Selkirk Mountains	Boundary County, Idaho	5,331 feet (1,625 m)	48°30′01″N 116°45′05″W	
Seven Devils Mountains	Idaho County, Idaho	9,268 feet (2,825 m)	45°18′33″N 116°33′18″W	
Seven Sisters	Boundary County, Idaho	6,929 feet (2,112 m)	48°39′17″N 116°39′49″W	
Sheep Creek Hills	Bear Lake County, Idaho	6,539 feet (1,993 m)	42°11′52″N 111°06′54″W	
Sheep Hills	Owyhee County, Idaho	5,161 feet (1,573 m)	42°18′39″N 116°38′45″W	
Sheep Mountain Range	Clearwater County, Idaho	5,686 feet (1,733 m)	46°47′30″N 115°33′53″W	
Shoshone Range	Shoshone County, Idaho	4,035 feet (1,230 m)	47°50′00″N 116°00′04″W	
Silver City Range	Owyhee County, Idaho	7,559 feet (2,304 m)	42°58′22″N 116°40′00″W	
Smoky Mountains	Blaine County, Idaho	10,118 feet (3,084 m)	43°39′47″N 114°39′52″W	
Snake River Range	Bonneville County, Idaho	9,751 feet (2,972 m)	43°23′19″N 111°05′03″W	
Snowdrift Mountain	Caribou County, Idaho	9,357 feet (2,852 m)	42°32′59″N 111°13′34″W	
Soda Springs Hills	Caribou County, Idaho	6,699 feet (2,042 m)	42°43′38″N 111°43′34″W	
Soldier Mountains	Elmore County, Idaho	6,942 feet (2,116 m)	43°34′04″N 115°10′13″W	
South Junipers	Fremont County, Idaho	6,109 feet (1,862 m)	44°00′35″N 111°51′59″W	
St. Joe Mountains	Shoshone County, Idaho	5,466 feet (1,666 m)	47°25′14″N 115°57′08″W	
Stone Hills	Oneida County, Idaho	5,472 feet (1,668 m)	42°01′05″N 112°47′27″W	
Sublett Range	Power County, Idaho	6,289 feet (1,917 m)	42°18′00″N 112°54′58″W	
Teton Range	Teton County, Wyoming	9,252 feet (2,820 m)	43°45′05″N 110°53′03″W	
The Breaks	Jefferson County, Idaho	4,905 feet (1,495 m)	43°56′13″N 112°21′53″W	
Three Buttes	Bingham County, Idaho	7,182 feet (2,189 m)	43°10′15″N 111°39′58″W	
Timmerman Hills	Blaine County, Idaho	5,627 feet (1,715 m)	43°18′17″N 114°15′59″W	
Trinity Mountains	Elmore County, Idaho	6,752 feet (2,058 m)	43°37′31″N 115°22′32″W	
Webster Range	Caribou County, Idaho	8,668 feet (2,642 m)	42°46′12″N 111°11′19″W	
West Mountains	Gem County, Idaho	5,823 feet (1,775 m)	44°28′00″N 116°14′04″W	
Western Centennial Mountains	Clark County, Idaho	9,390 feet (2,860 m)	44°33′05″N 111°52′15″W	
White Cloud Mountains	Custer County, Idaho	11,788 feet (3,593 m)	44°02′22″N 114°35′08″W	
White Hills	Custer County, Idaho	8,215 feet (2,504 m)	44°31′38″N 114°03′56″W	
White Knob Mountains	Custer County, Idaho	8,064 feet (2,458 m)	43°48′00″N 113°42′03″W	
White Mountains	Custer County, Idaho	9,600 feet (2,900 m)	43°44′50″N 113°58′23″W	
Williams Range	Clearwater County, Idaho	7,087 feet (2,160 m)	46°37′51″N 114°48′40″W	
Wooley Range	Caribou County, Idaho	7,208 feet (2,197 m)	42°50′15″N 111°25′16″W	
Yellowjacket Mountains	Lemhi County, Idaho	8,018 feet (2,444 m)	45°03′03″N 114°35′03″W	

== See also ==
- Bitterroot National Forest
- List of mountain ranges in Montana
- List of mountain peaks of Idaho
