= Smiley Mountain =

Mountain in Idaho, United States

- Location within Idaho

Highest point
- Elevation: 11,427 ft (3,483 m)
- Prominence: 2,668 ft (813 m)
- Isolation: 11.28 mi (18.15 km)
- Coordinates: 43°41′59″N 113°48′38″W

Geography
- Parent range: Pioneer Mountains
- Topo map: USGS Smiley Mountain

Smiley Mountain is a 11,427-foot (3,483 m) peak in Custer County, Idaho, USA, and one of the higher points in the Pioneer Mountains. It is located in the Salmon-Challis National Forest, about 15 miles (24 km) west of Lost River.

== Climate ==
Climate data for Smiley Mountain 43.7016 N, 113.8096 W, Elevation: 11,001 ft (3,353 m) (1991–2020 normals)
Month	Jan	Feb	Mar	Apr	May	Jun	Jul	Aug	Sep	Oct	Nov	Dec	Year
Mean daily maximum °F (°C)	21.2 (−6.0)	21.0 (−6.1)	26.4 (−3.1)	32.2 (0.1)	41.4 (5.2)	51.0 (10.6)	62.3 (16.8)	61.7 (16.5)	52.7 (11.5)	39.7 (4.3)	26.2 (−3.2)	20.1 (−6.6)	38.0 (3.3)
Daily mean °F (°C)	13.8 (−10.1)	12.5 (−10.8)	16.6 (−8.6)	21.2 (−6.0)	29.9 (−1.2)	38.8 (3.8)	49.0 (9.4)	48.4 (9.1)	39.8 (4.3)	28.7 (−1.8)	18.6 (−7.4)	13.0 (−10.6)	27.5 (−2.5)
Mean daily minimum °F (°C)	6.4 (−14.2)	4.1 (−15.5)	6.7 (−14.1)	10.3 (−12.1)	18.5 (−7.5)	26.7 (−2.9)	35.7 (2.1)	35.0 (1.7)	26.9 (−2.8)	17.8 (−7.9)	11.0 (−11.7)	5.9 (−14.5)	17.1 (−8.3)
Average precipitation inches (mm)	2.87 (73)	3.09 (78)	4.22 (107)	3.35 (85)	3.85 (98)	2.61 (66)	1.17 (30)	1.04 (26)	1.81 (46)	2.65 (67)	2.74 (70)	3.57 (91)	32.97 (837)
Source: PRISM Climate Group

== See also ==
- List of mountain peaks of Idaho
