= Flatiron Mountain (Idaho) =

Mountain in Idaho, United States

- Location within Idaho

Highest point
- Elevation: 11,019 ft (3,359 m)
- Prominence: 499 ft (152 m)
- Parent peak: Big Creek Peak
- Coordinates: 44°27′40″N 113°31′34″W

Geography
- Location: Lemhi County, Idaho, U.S.
- Parent range: Lemhi Range
- Topo map: USGS Big Creek Peak

Climbing
- Easiest route: Scramble, class 3

Flatiron Mountain, at 11,109 feet (3,386 m) above sea level is a peak in the Lemhi Range of Idaho. The peak is located in Lemhi County on the border of Caribou-Targhee National Forest and Salmon-Challis National Forest. It is about 1.1 mi (1.8 km) southeast of Big Creek Peak.
