= Sheep Mountain (Idaho) =

Mountain in Idaho, United States

- Bowery Peak
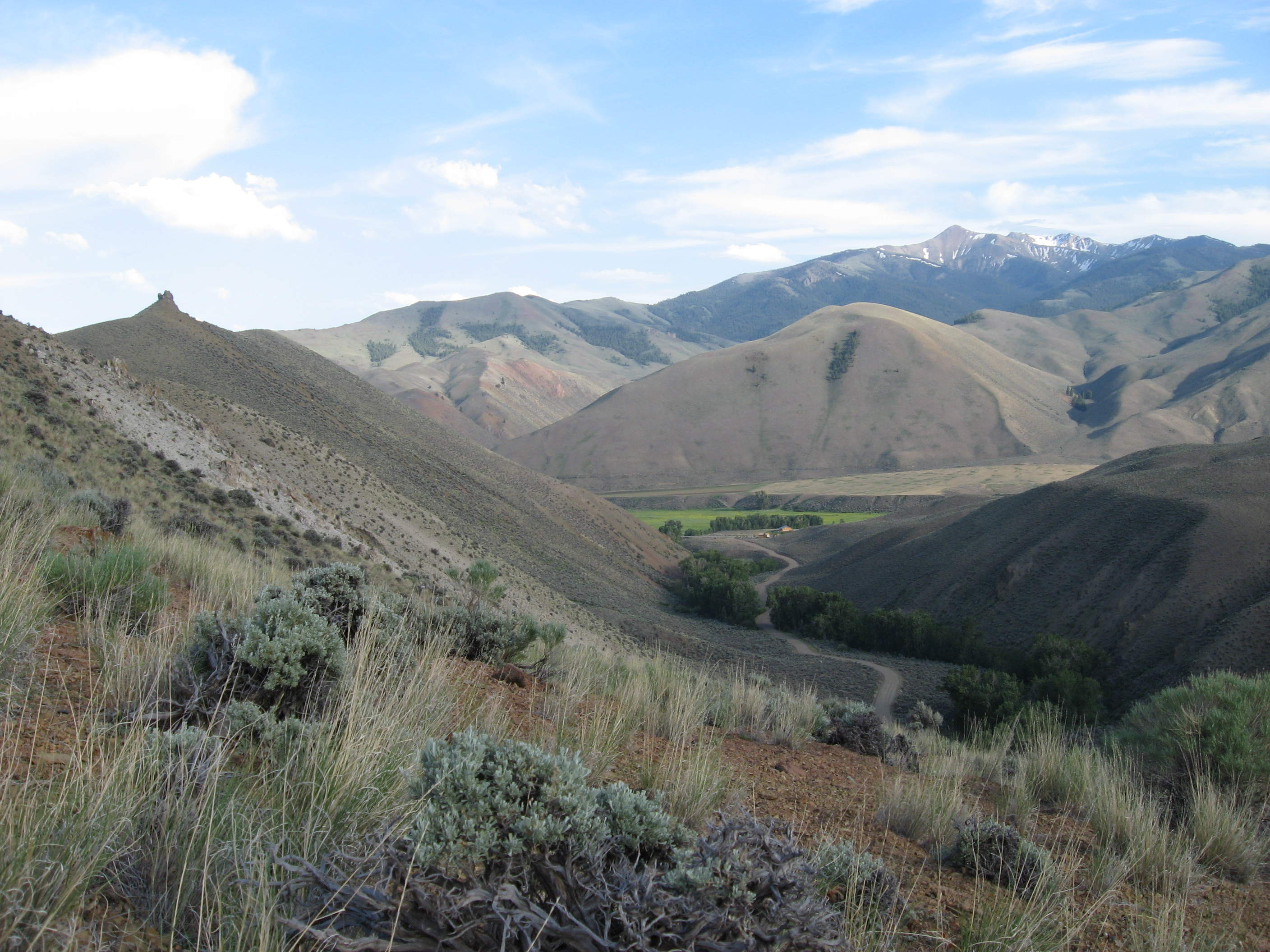

Highest point
- Elevation: 3,326 m (10,912 ft)
- Prominence: 697 m (2,287 ft)
- Parent peak: Griswold Peak
- Isolation: 14.04 km (8.72 mi)
- Coordinates: 44.0646°N 114.3601°W

Geography
- Location within Idaho Location within the United States
- Location: Custer County, Idaho
- Parent range: Boulder Mountains

Sheep Mountain is a mountain in Custer County, Idaho, in the Boulder Mountains. At 3326m high, it is the 17th tallest peak with at least 500m of prominence in Idaho.
