= Bell Mountain (Idaho) =

Mountain in the state of Idaho

- Location within Idaho

Highest point
- Elevation: 11,617 ft (3,541 m) NAVD 88
- Prominence: 1,732 ft (528 m)
- Parent peak: Diamond Peak
- Coordinates: 44°14′12″N 113°11′43″W

Geography
- Location: Lemhi County, Idaho, U.S.
- Parent range: Lemhi Range
- Topo map: USGS Bell Mountain

Climbing
- Easiest route: Scramble, class 3

Bell Mountain, at 11,612 feet (3,539 m) above sea level, is the second highest peak in the Lemhi Range of Idaho. The peak is the highest point in Lemhi County and located 0.2 mi (0.32 km) north of the border with Butte County. The peak is located on the border of Caribou-Targhee National Forest and Salmon-Challis National Forest. It is about 9.5 mi (15.3 km) northwest of Diamond Peak. It is the 37th highest peak in Idaho.

The peak is named after Robert Norman Bell.
