= Shelly Mountain =

Mountain in Idaho, United States

- Location within Idaho

Highest point
- Elevation: 3,439 m (11,283 ft)
- Prominence: 714 m (2,343 ft)
- Isolation: 15.63 km (9.71 mi)
- Coordinates: 43.8265°N 113.7263°W

Geography
- Location: Custer County, Idaho
- Parent range: White Knob Mountains

Shelly Mountain is a mountain in Custer County, Idaho, in the White Knob Mountains. At 3439 m (11,283 ft), it is the 13th highest peak with at least 500m of prominence in Idaho.
