= She Devil (mountain) =

Mountain in Idaho, United States

Coordinates: 45°19′10″N 116°31′59″W

She Devil is a summit in Idaho County, Idaho, in the United States. It forms part of the Seven Devils Mountains. With an elevation of 9,242 feet (2,817 m), She Devil is the 265th highest summit in the state of Idaho. It is considered to be an ultra-prominent peak, one of about 1515 such peaks in the world.

She Devil was named from Nez Perce mythology.
