= Big Creek Peak =

Mountain in Idaho, United States

- Location within Idaho

Highest point
- Elevation: 11,350 ft (3,460 m)
- Prominence: 2,517 ft (767 m)
- Parent peak: Bell Mountain
- Coordinates: 44°28′18″N 113°32′38″W

Geography
- Location: Lemhi County, Idaho, U.S.
- Parent range: Lemhi Range
- Topo map: USGS Big Creek Peak

Climbing
- Easiest route: Simple scrambling, class 2

Big Creek Peak, at 11,350 feet (3,460 m) above sea level is a peak in the Lemhi Range of Idaho. The peak is located in Lemhi County on the border of Caribou-Targhee National Forest and Salmon-Challis National Forest. It is about 1.1 mi (1.8 km) northwest of Flatiron Mountain and 23.7 mi (38.1 km) northwest of Bell Mountain, its line parent. It is the 55th highest peak in Idaho.

== Climate ==
Climate data for Big Creek Peak 44.4698 N, 113.5415 W, Elevation: 10,751 ft (3,277 m) (1991–2020 normals)
| Month | Jan | Feb | Mar | Apr | May | Jun | Jul | Aug | Sep | Oct | Nov | Dec | Year |
|---|---|---|---|---|---|---|---|---|---|---|---|---|---|
| Mean daily maximum °F (°C) | 21.1 (−6.1) | 20.7 (−6.3) | 25.5 (−3.6) | 30.9 (−0.6) | 40.4 (4.7) | 49.9 (9.9) | 61.7 (16.5) | 61.2 (16.2) | 51.9 (11.1) | 38.5 (3.6) | 25.9 (−3.4) | 20.0 (−6.7) | 37.3 (2.9) |
| Daily mean °F (°C) | 13.6 (−10.2) | 12.2 (−11.0) | 15.9 (−8.9) | 20.4 (−6.4) | 29.3 (−1.5) | 38.0 (3.3) | 48.5 (9.2) | 48.0 (8.9) | 39.2 (4.0) | 27.8 (−2.3) | 18.2 (−7.7) | 12.7 (−10.7) | 27.0 (−2.8) |
| Mean daily minimum °F (°C) | 6.1 (−14.4) | 3.6 (−15.8) | 6.3 (−14.3) | 9.9 (−12.3) | 18.1 (−7.7) | 26.1 (−3.3) | 35.3 (1.8) | 34.8 (1.6) | 26.4 (−3.1) | 17.2 (−8.2) | 10.6 (−11.9) | 5.5 (−14.7) | 16.7 (−8.5) |
| Average precipitation inches (mm) | 2.74 (70) | 2.66 (68) | 3.48 (88) | 4.67 (119) | 4.73 (120) | 3.80 (97) | 1.40 (36) | 1.55 (39) | 2.01 (51) | 2.96 (75) | 2.97 (75) | 3.11 (79) | 36.08 (917) |
Source: PRISM Climate Group
