= Buffalo Hump (Idaho) =

American mountain peak

Coordinates: 45°37′14″N 115°42′03″W

Buffalo Hump is a summit in the U.S. state of Idaho.

Buffalo Hump was so named from the fact its outline resembled a buffalo's hump; the English name perhaps is a translation of the Native American name.
