= Portneuf Range =

Mountain range in Idaho, United States

- Location within Idaho

Highest point
- Peak: Bonneville Peak
- Elevation: 2,826 m (9,272 ft)

Geography
- Country: United States
- State: Idaho
- District(s): Caribou, Franklin, and Bannock counties
- Range coordinates: 42°52′00″N 112°11′00″W
- Topo map: USGS Preston

The Portneuf Range is a small mountain range in Caribou, Franklin, and Bannock counties in Idaho, United States.

== Description ==
The range is bounded by the Bear River Range on the east and the Bannock Range on the west. The highest point in the range is Bonneville Peak, at 9,271 feet (2,826 m).

U.S. Route 30 runs east–west through the middle of the range.

== See also ==
- List of mountain ranges in Idaho
