= Bannock Range =

Mountain range in Idaho

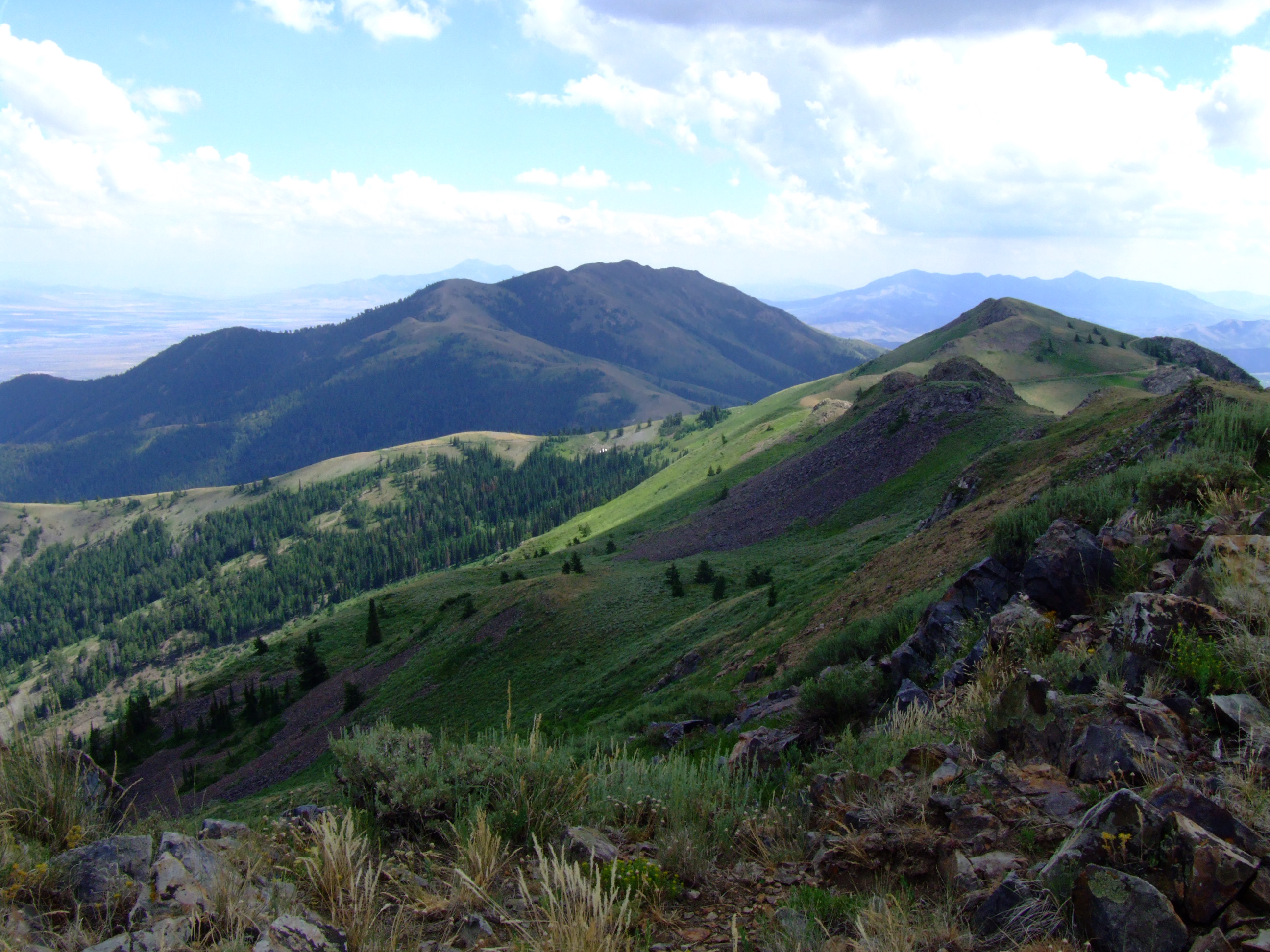
- Old Tom Mountain

Highest point
- Peak: Oxford Peak
- Elevation: 7,018 ft (2,139 m)
- Listing: Mountain ranges of Idaho
- Coordinates: 42°25′00″N 112°17′03″W

Dimensions
- Length: 65 mi (105 km) NW/SE

Geography
- Location within Idaho
- Country: United States
- State: Idaho
- Parent range: Rocky Mountains

The Bannock Range is a mountain range situated in southern Idaho, near the Idaho-Utah border. 28 named mountains are located within the boundaries of the range, the tallest sitting at an elevation of 9,300 feet (2,800 m).

== Location ==
The range is located in Southern Idaho, and sits along the Portneuf River to the east and the Bear River to its south. To the north of the range is Pocatello. Large portions of the range are privately owned, and 13% is maintained by the U.S. Bureau of Land Management. Two large thrust faults are located in the range, and a gravitational fault exists on its eastern edge.

== Notable peaks ==
Rank	Mountain Peak	Elevation	Prominence
1	Oxford Peak	9,300 feet (2,800 m)	4,030 feet (1,230 m)
2	Elkhorn Peak	9,095 feet (2,772 m)	3,515 feet (1,071 m)
3	Wakley Peak	8,801 feet (2,683 m)	741 feet (226 m)
4	Old Tom Mountain	8,733 feet (2,662 m)	2,913 feet (888 m)
5	Scout Mountain	8,710 feet (2,650 m)	1,240 feet (380 m)
6	Peak 8621	8,621 feet (2,628 m)	361 feet (110 m)
7	Peak 8540	8,540 feet (2,600 m)	360 feet (110 m)
8	Kents Peak	8,451 feet (2,576 m)	71 feet (22 m)
9	Old Baldy Peak	8,356 feet (2,547 m)	1,256 feet (383 m)
10	Peak 8339	8,165 feet (2,489 m)	319 feet (97 m)

== See also ==
- Albion Mountains
- Beaverhead Mountains
