= Lemhi Range =

Mountain range

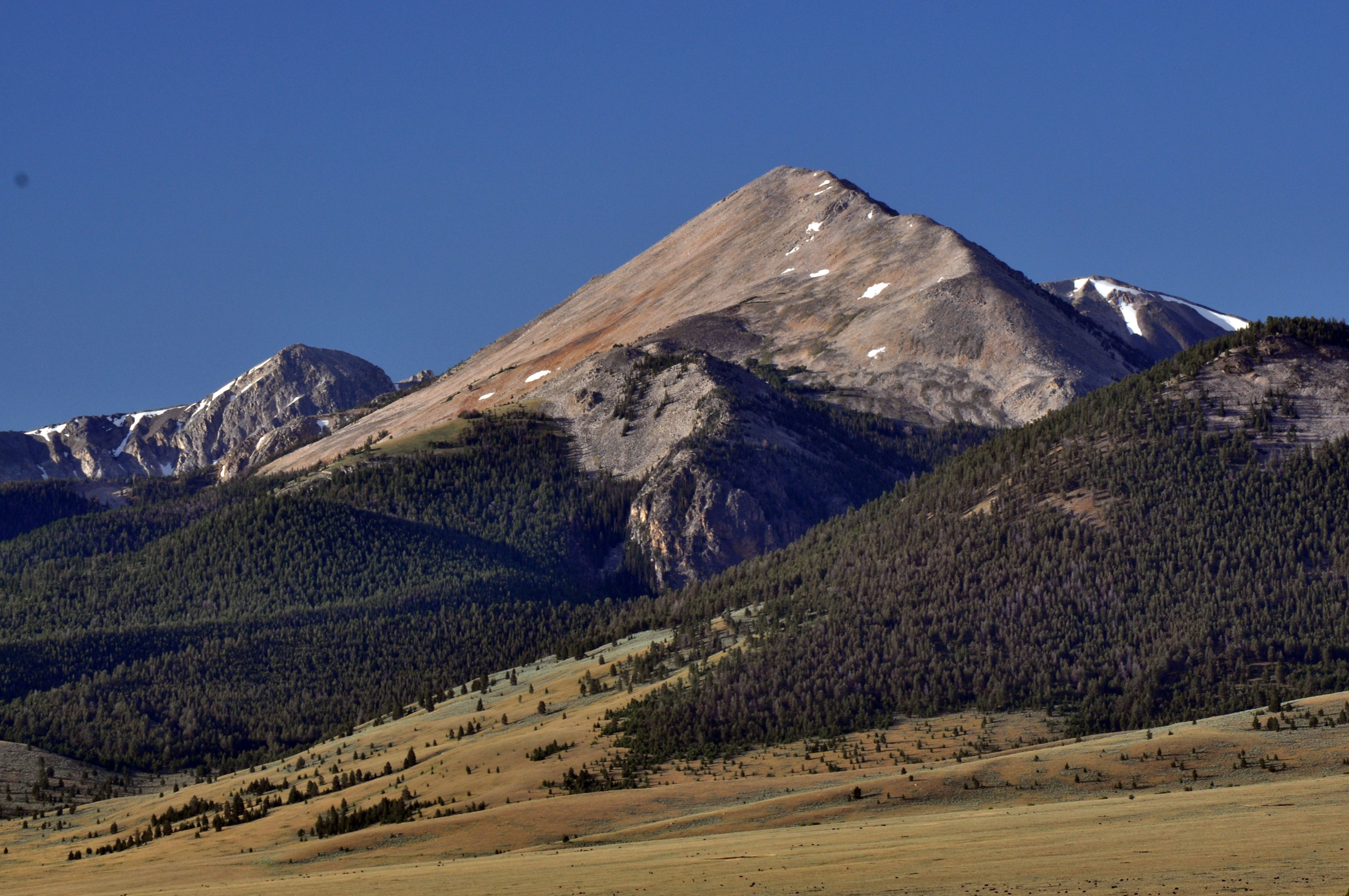

Highest point
- Peak: Diamond Peak
- Elevation: 12,197 ft (3,718 m)
- Coordinates: 44°08′30″N 113°04′58″W

Dimensions
- Length: 98 mi (158 km) N/S
- Width: 61 mi (98 km) E/W
- Area: 1,946 mi^{2} (5,040 km^{2})

Geography
- Country: United States
- State: Idaho
- Parent range: Rocky Mountains

The Lemhi Range is a mountain range in the U.S. state of Idaho, spanning the eastern part of the state between the Lost River Range and the Beaverhead Mountains. The highest point in the range is Diamond Peak at 12,202 feet (3,719 m), the third highest peak in Idaho. The range is located within Salmon-Challis and Caribou-Targhee National Forests.

== Peaks ==
The ten highest peaks of the Lemhi Range
Mountain Peak	Elevation	Prominence	Isolation	Location
Diamond Peak	12,195 ft 3717 m	5,377 ft 1639 m	31.8 mi 51.2 km	44.141667°N 113.082778°W
Bell Mountain	11,611 ft 3539 m	1,732 ft 528 m	8.59 mi 13.83 km	44.236671°N 113.194443°W
The Riddler	11,558 ft 3523 m	558 ft 170 m	1.11 mi 1.78 km	44.125839°N 113.085747°W
Big Boy Peak	11,401 ft 3475 m	322 ft 98 m	0.73 mi 1.17 km	44.116612°N 113.078681°W
Big Creek Peak	11,348 ft 3459 m	2,516 ft 767 m	22.4 mi 36.1 km	44.47177°N 113.543196°W
Little Diamond Peak	11,273 ft 3436 m	873 ft 266 m	2.81 mi 4.52 km	44.07642°N 113.069682°W
Shoshone John Peak	11,211 ft 3417 m	531 ft 162 m	1.01 mi 1.63 km	44.102546°N 113.072763°W
Nicholson Peak	11,040 ft 3365 m	814 ft 248 m	1.47 mi 2.37 km	44.080361°N 113.098806°W
Flatiron Mountain	11,020 ft 3359 m	502 ft 153 m	1.15 mi 1.85 km	44.461062°N 113.525314°W
Peak 11005	11,005 ft 3354 m	525 ft 160 m	1.32 mi 2.13 km	44.157185°N 113.098371°W

== Climate ==
Near the Little Lost River tributary Sawmill Creek is the SNOTEL weather station Moonshine. It is surrounded by the Lemhi Range peaks of Sheep Mountain and Bear Mountain, and it is 7.3 miles (11.7 km) south of Flatiron Mountain (Idaho). Moonshine has a subalpine climate (Köppen Dfc).

Climate data for Moonshine, Idaho, 1991–2020 normals, 1988-2020 extremes: 7440ft (2268m)
Month	Jan	Feb	Mar	Apr	May	Jun	Jul	Aug	Sep	Oct	Nov	Dec	Year
Record high °F (°C)	61 (16)	56 (13)	65 (18)	72 (22)	82 (28)	90 (32)	94 (34)	91 (33)	87 (31)	79 (26)	61 (16)	51 (11)	94 (34)
Mean maximum °F (°C)	44.5 (6.9)	47.6 (8.7)	54.9 (12.7)	63.3 (17.4)	72.0 (22.2)	80.2 (26.8)	86.6 (30.3)	85.3 (29.6)	79.8 (26.6)	67.4 (19.7)	52.0 (11.1)	43.4 (6.3)	87.4 (30.8)
Mean daily maximum °F (°C)	31.9 (−0.1)	34.4 (1.3)	41.5 (5.3)	47.8 (8.8)	56.8 (13.8)	65.7 (18.7)	77.0 (25.0)	75.4 (24.1)	65.4 (18.6)	50.7 (10.4)	37.3 (2.9)	29.9 (−1.2)	51.2 (10.6)
Daily mean °F (°C)	18.0 (−7.8)	19.7 (−6.8)	26.8 (−2.9)	34.3 (1.3)	43.4 (6.3)	50.6 (10.3)	59.2 (15.1)	57.9 (14.4)	49.6 (9.8)	38.2 (3.4)	25.1 (−3.8)	17.1 (−8.3)	36.7 (2.6)
Mean daily minimum °F (°C)	4.1 (−15.5)	5.1 (−14.9)	12.1 (−11.1)	20.6 (−6.3)	29.8 (−1.2)	35.5 (1.9)	41.4 (5.2)	40.3 (4.6)	33.8 (1.0)	25.5 (−3.6)	12.9 (−10.6)	4.3 (−15.4)	22.1 (−5.5)
Mean minimum °F (°C)	−15.2 (−26.2)	−14.0 (−25.6)	−6.6 (−21.4)	4.4 (−15.3)	17.9 (−7.8)	26.9 (−2.8)	33.4 (0.8)	32.0 (0.0)	23.5 (−4.7)	10.3 (−12.1)	−6.3 (−21.3)	−14.6 (−25.9)	−19.8 (−28.8)
Record low °F (°C)	−25 (−32)	−25 (−32)	−19 (−28)	−6 (−21)	7 (−14)	15 (−9)	26 (−3)	22 (−6)	11 (−12)	−12 (−24)	−21 (−29)	−38 (−39)	−38 (−39)
Average precipitation inches (mm)	2.32 (59)	1.94 (49)	2.21 (56)	2.03 (52)	2.32 (59)	2.14 (54)	0.85 (22)	0.86 (22)	1.36 (35)	1.63 (41)	1.73 (44)	2.65 (67)	22.04 (560)
Source 1: XMACIS2
Source 2: NOAA (Precipitation)

== See also ==
- List of mountain ranges in Idaho
