= Diamond Peak (Idaho) =

Mountain in Idaho, United States

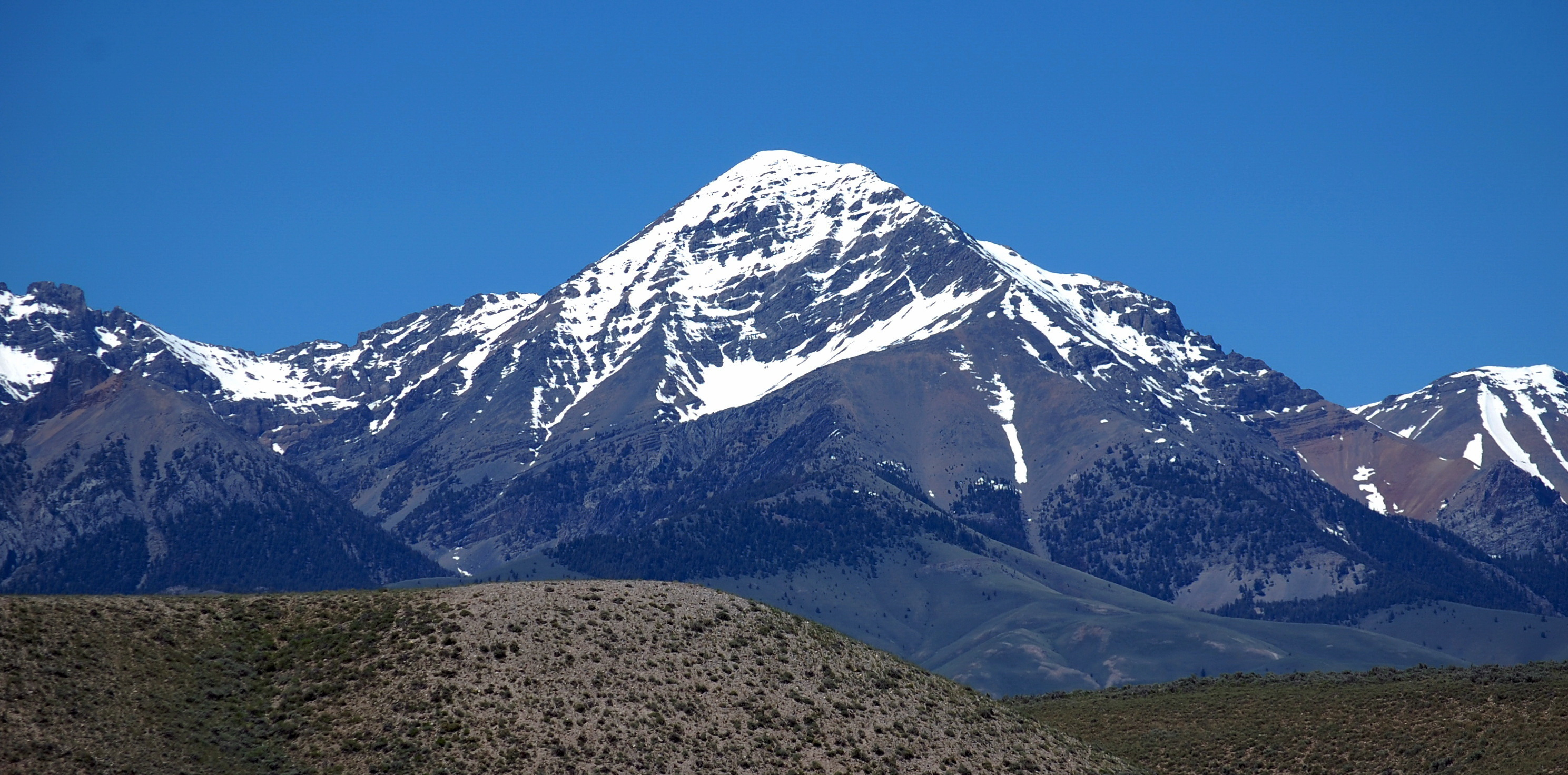
- Diamond Peak from Idaho highway 28

Highest point
- Elevation: 12,202 ft (3,719 m)
- Prominence: 5,377 ft (1,639 m)
- Listing: US most prominent peaks 98th
- Coordinates: 44°08′30″N 113°04′58″W

Geography
- Location within Idaho
- Location: Butte County, Idaho, U.S.
- Parent range: Lemhi Range
- Topo map: USGS Diamond Peak

Climbing
- First ascent: 1912, T.M. Bannon
- Easiest route: Scramble, class 3

Diamond Peak is the highest point in the Lemhi Range in the Rocky Mountains in Idaho. At 12,202 feet (3,719 m) above sea level, it is the third highest peak in Idaho. It is situated 34.5 miles (55.5 km) east of Borah Peak in the Lost River Range, opposite the Little Lost River valley. It is the highest point in the Caribou–Targhee National Forest. The closest higher peak is Mount Church, which is 31.8 mi (51.2 km) to the west.

== Climate ==
Climate data for Diamond Peak 44.1412 N, 113.0849 W, Elevation: 11,519 ft (3,511 m) (1991–2020 normals)
Month	Jan	Feb	Mar	Apr	May	Jun	Jul	Aug	Sep	Oct	Nov	Dec	Year
Mean daily maximum °F (°C)	19.2 (−7.1)	18.6 (−7.4)	22.8 (−5.1)	27.7 (−2.4)	37.4 (3.0)	47.4 (8.6)	59.0 (15.0)	58.6 (14.8)	49.5 (9.7)	36.2 (2.3)	24.1 (−4.4)	18.3 (−7.6)	34.9 (1.6)
Daily mean °F (°C)	11.2 (−11.6)	9.5 (−12.5)	12.9 (−10.6)	17.1 (−8.3)	25.9 (−3.4)	35.0 (1.7)	44.9 (7.2)	44.5 (6.9)	36.3 (2.4)	25.3 (−3.7)	15.9 (−8.9)	10.5 (−11.9)	24.1 (−4.4)
Mean daily minimum °F (°C)	3.1 (−16.1)	0.4 (−17.6)	3.0 (−16.1)	6.5 (−14.2)	14.5 (−9.7)	22.6 (−5.2)	30.8 (−0.7)	30.4 (−0.9)	23.1 (−4.9)	14.3 (−9.8)	7.8 (−13.4)	2.7 (−16.3)	13.3 (−10.4)
Average precipitation inches (mm)	2.93 (74)	2.42 (61)	2.97 (75)	4.06 (103)	5.02 (128)	3.89 (99)	1.79 (45)	1.83 (46)	2.03 (52)	2.75 (70)	2.11 (54)	3.09 (78)	34.89 (885)
Source: PRISM Climate Group

== See also ==
- List of mountain peaks of North America
  - List of mountain peaks of the United States
    - List of Ultras of the United States
