= Beaverhead Mountains =

Mountain range in the U.S. states of Montana and Idaho

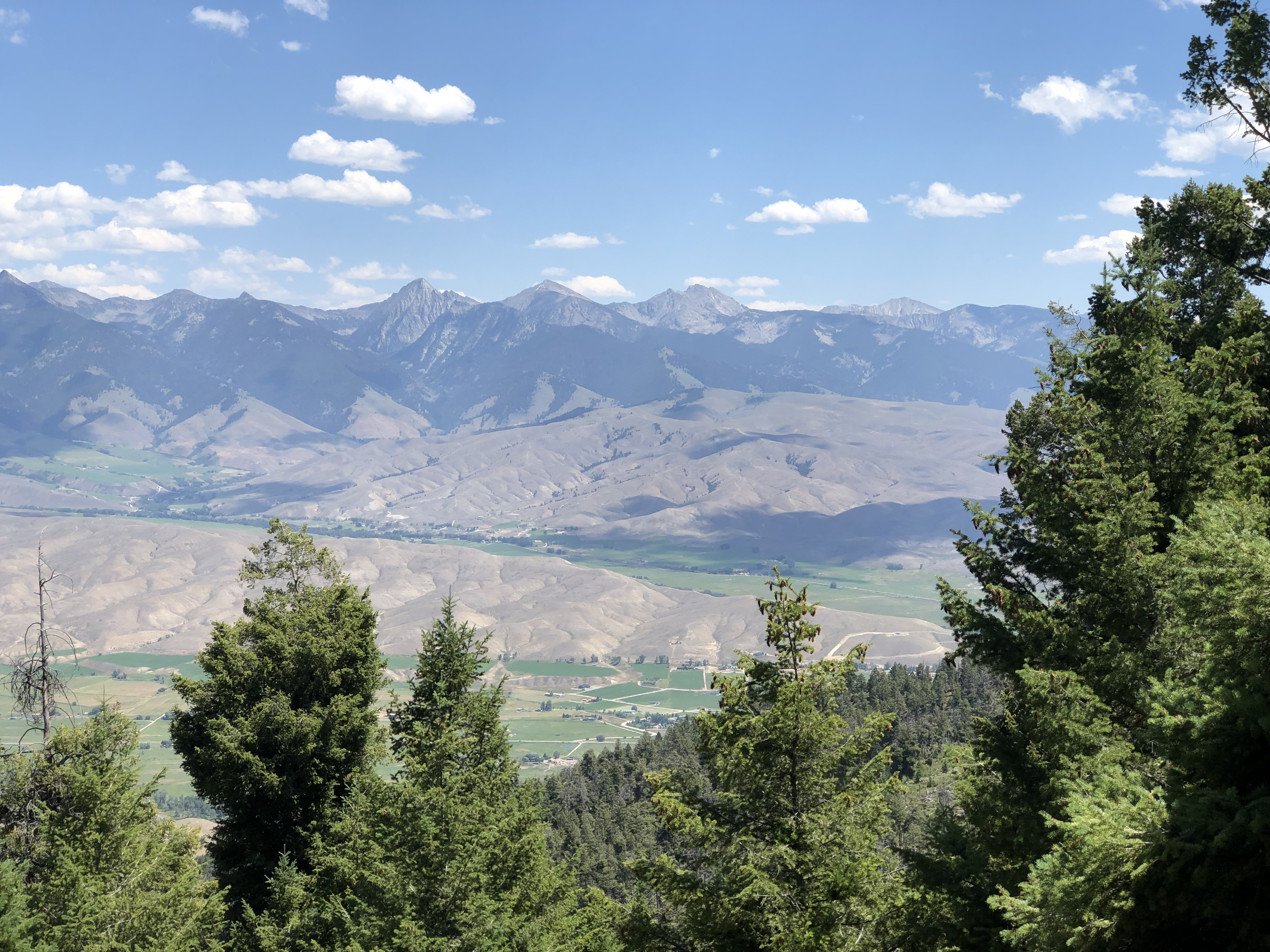
- Beaverhead Range including Ajax Peak, Copperhead Peak, Monument Peak, and Center Mountain. Viewed from the Salmon River Range above Carmen, ID.

Highest point
- Peak: Scott Peak
- Elevation: 11,393 ft (3,473 m)
- Coordinates: 44°21′14″N 112°49′17″W

Dimensions
- Area: 4,532 mi^{2} (11,740 km^{2})

Geography
- Location within the United States
- Country: United States
- States: Montana and Idaho
- Parent range: Bitterroot Range
- Borders on: Bitterroot Mountains, Centennial Mountains and Pioneer Mountains

The Beaverhead Mountains, highest point Scott Peak, el. 11,393 feet (3,473 m), are a mountain range straddling the Continental Divide in the U.S. states of Montana and Idaho. (See also the GNIS link here.) They are a sub-range of the Bitterroot Range, and divide Beaverhead County, Montana from Lemhi County, Idaho and Clark County, Idaho.

== Geography ==
The Beaverheads encompass an area of 4,532 square miles (11,738 km^{2}). They lie to the east of the Bitterroot Mountains, to the south-west of the Big Hole Basin and the Pioneer Mountains and to the west of the Centennial Mountains. Passes in the mountains include Lemhi Pass, Bannock Pass, Big Hole Pass, Big Hole Pass II, Junction Pass and Monida Pass. The Beaverheads are further subdivided into the West Big Hole Mountains, the Big Hole Divide, the Tendoy Mountains, the Italian Peaks, and the Garfield Peaks.

=== Climate ===
Homer Youngs Peak is a mountain in the West Big Hole roadless area.

Climate data for Homer Youngs Peak (MT) 45.3088 N, 113.6757 W, Elevation: 9,977 ft (3,041 m) (1991–2020 normals)
Month	Jan	Feb	Mar	Apr	May	Jun	Jul	Aug	Sep	Oct	Nov	Dec	Year
Mean daily maximum °F (°C)	22.3 (−5.4)	22.4 (−5.3)	27.9 (−2.3)	32.7 (0.4)	42.3 (5.7)	51.3 (10.7)	63.2 (17.3)	62.9 (17.2)	53.2 (11.8)	39.5 (4.2)	27.3 (−2.6)	21.3 (−5.9)	38.9 (3.8)
Daily mean °F (°C)	15.2 (−9.3)	14.1 (−9.9)	18.2 (−7.7)	22.4 (−5.3)	31.2 (−0.4)	39.5 (4.2)	49.7 (9.8)	49.4 (9.7)	41.0 (5.0)	29.6 (−1.3)	19.9 (−6.7)	14.3 (−9.8)	28.7 (−1.8)
Mean daily minimum °F (°C)	8.0 (−13.3)	5.7 (−14.6)	8.5 (−13.1)	12.1 (−11.1)	20.1 (−6.6)	27.7 (−2.4)	36.2 (2.3)	36.0 (2.2)	28.8 (−1.8)	19.7 (−6.8)	12.5 (−10.8)	7.3 (−13.7)	18.6 (−7.5)
Average precipitation inches (mm)	5.21 (132)	4.27 (108)	4.47 (114)	4.96 (126)	4.84 (123)	4.51 (115)	1.59 (40)	1.45 (37)	2.21 (56)	3.46 (88)	4.90 (124)	5.47 (139)	47.34 (1,202)
Source: PRISM Climate Group

Climate data for Darkhorse Lake, Montana, 1991–2020 normals: 8600ft (2621m)
Month	Jan	Feb	Mar	Apr	May	Jun	Jul	Aug	Sep	Oct	Nov	Dec	Year
Mean daily maximum °F (°C)	25.4 (−3.7)	27.1 (−2.7)	33.6 (0.9)	39.6 (4.2)	48.5 (9.2)	55.5 (13.1)	65.8 (18.8)	64.8 (18.2)	54.8 (12.7)	41.5 (5.3)	30.2 (−1.0)	24.0 (−4.4)	42.6 (5.9)
Daily mean °F (°C)	19.4 (−7.0)	19.8 (−6.8)	25.0 (−3.9)	30.0 (−1.1)	38.6 (3.7)	45.3 (7.4)	54.5 (12.5)	53.8 (12.1)	45.7 (7.6)	34.1 (1.2)	24.1 (−4.4)	18.2 (−7.7)	34.0 (1.1)
Mean daily minimum °F (°C)	13.5 (−10.3)	12.5 (−10.8)	16.4 (−8.7)	20.4 (−6.4)	28.6 (−1.9)	35.2 (1.8)	43.2 (6.2)	42.8 (6.0)	36.5 (2.5)	26.8 (−2.9)	17.9 (−7.8)	12.3 (−10.9)	25.5 (−3.6)
Average precipitation inches (mm)	5.20 (132)	3.92 (100)	4.25 (108)	4.78 (121)	4.56 (116)	4.41 (112)	1.53 (39)	1.42 (36)	2.20 (56)	3.33 (85)	4.75 (121)	5.16 (131)	45.51 (1,157)
Source 1: XMACIS2
Source 2: NOAA (Precipitation)

== Etymology ==
The mountains take their name from Beaverhead Rock, to the north of the mountains. Major summits in the Beaverheads include Garfield Mountain (10,961 ft) and Eighteenmile Peak (11,141 ft).

== Roadless areas ==
The Beaverheads contain two large roadless areas, one predominantly in Montana and the other predominantly in Idaho.

=== West Big Hole ===
The West Big Hole roadless area is mostly in Montana and is about 215,000 acres in size. It includes parts of the Beaverhead National Forest in Montana and the Salmon National Forest in Idaho, and ranges in elevation from 4,500 feet on the Salmon River in Idaho to 10,620 feet at Homer Youngs Peak in Montana. Rugged peaks, semiarid foothills on the Idaho side, and extensive conifer forests on the Montana side provide habitat for a large elk herd that winters in Idaho and summers in Montana. The Montana side drains into the Big Hole River, a blue-ribbon trout stream. Marshy glacial valleys on the Montana portion constitute some of the best moose habitat in the state. Other wildlife includes black bear, mountain goat, bighorn sheep, lynx, marten, and deer.

=== Idaho roadless area ===
The other large roadless area is mainly in Idaho and is centered on the Italian Peaks portion of the range. This area is about 360,000 acres in size and contains portions of the Beaverhead, Salmon, and Targhee National Forests. Scott Peak, el. 11,393 feet, the highest point in the Beaverheads, is in this roadless area. This area is predominantly semiarid sagebrush grassland with pockets of coniferous forest, large areas of quaking aspen, and alpine peaks. Wildlife includes pronghorn, black bear, golden eagle, elk, and mule deer.

These two roadless areas, along with the Centennial Mountains to the east and other roadless areas along the Continental Divide to the west, are important biological connectors allowing wildlife to migrate and disperse between two large wildland complexes: The Greater Yellowstone Ecosystem and Central Idaho Wilderness Ecosystem.

== See also ==
- List of mountains of Idaho
- List of mountain peaks of Idaho
- List of mountain ranges in Idaho
- List of mountain ranges in Montana
