= Mount Corruption =

Mountain in Idaho, United States

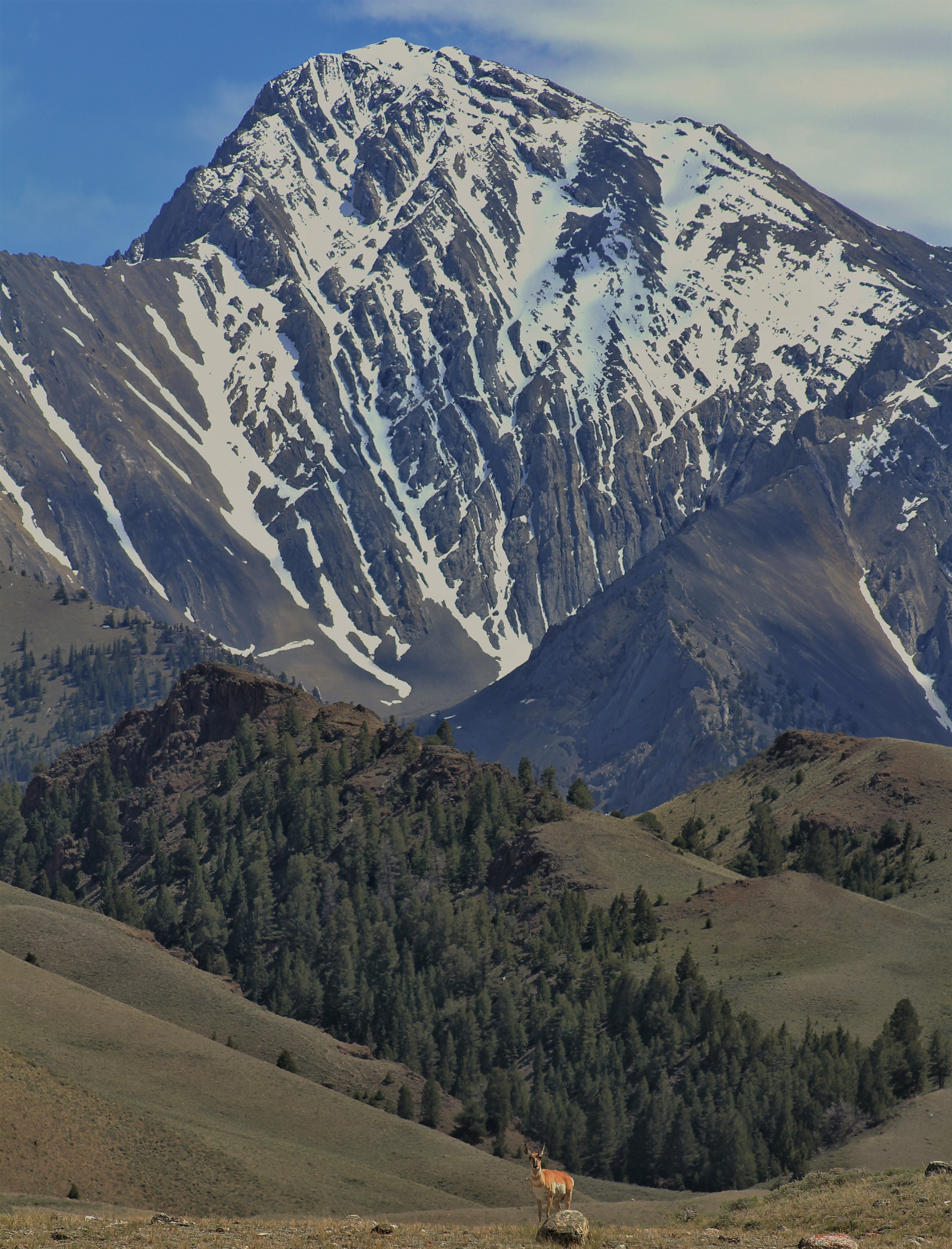
- North aspect

Highest point
- Elevation: 11,857 ft (3,614 m)
- Prominence: 1,657 ft (505 m)
- Parent peak: Mount Breitenbach (12,140 ft)
- Isolation: 3.15 mi (5.07 km)
- Coordinates: 44°06′52″N 113°40′14″W

Geography
- Location within Idaho Location within the United States
- Location: Salmon–Challis National Forest
- Country: United States of America
- State: Idaho
- County: Custer
- Parent range: Lost River Range; Rocky Mountains
- Topo map: USGS Leatherman Peak

Geology
- Rock age: Mississippian
- Mountain type: Fault block
- Rock type: Limestone

Climbing
- Easiest route: class 3 scrambling

Mount Corruption is an 11,857-foot elevation (3,614 m) mountain summit located in Custer County, Idaho, United States.

== Description ==
Mount Corruption ranks as the 21st-highest peak in Idaho and is part of the Lost River Range which is a subset of the Rocky Mountains. The mountain is set on land managed by Salmon–Challis National Forest. Neighbors include Little Regret Peak two miles south, line parent Mount Breitenbach, 3.4 miles south, Leatherman Peak is 3.8 miles to the southwest, and Borah Peak, the highest peak in Idaho, is 5.6 miles to the west-northwest. Precipitation runoff from the mountain's slopes drains to tributaries of the Pahsimeroi River. Topographic relief is significant as the summit rises over 3,600 feet (1,100 meters) above the East Fork Pahsimeroi in approximately one mile.

== Climate ==
Based on the Köppen climate classification, Mount Corruption is located in an alpine subarctic climate zone with long, cold, snowy winters, and cool to warm summers. Winter temperatures can drop below −10 °F with wind chill factors below −30 °F.

== See also ==
- List of mountain peaks of Idaho

== Gallery ==
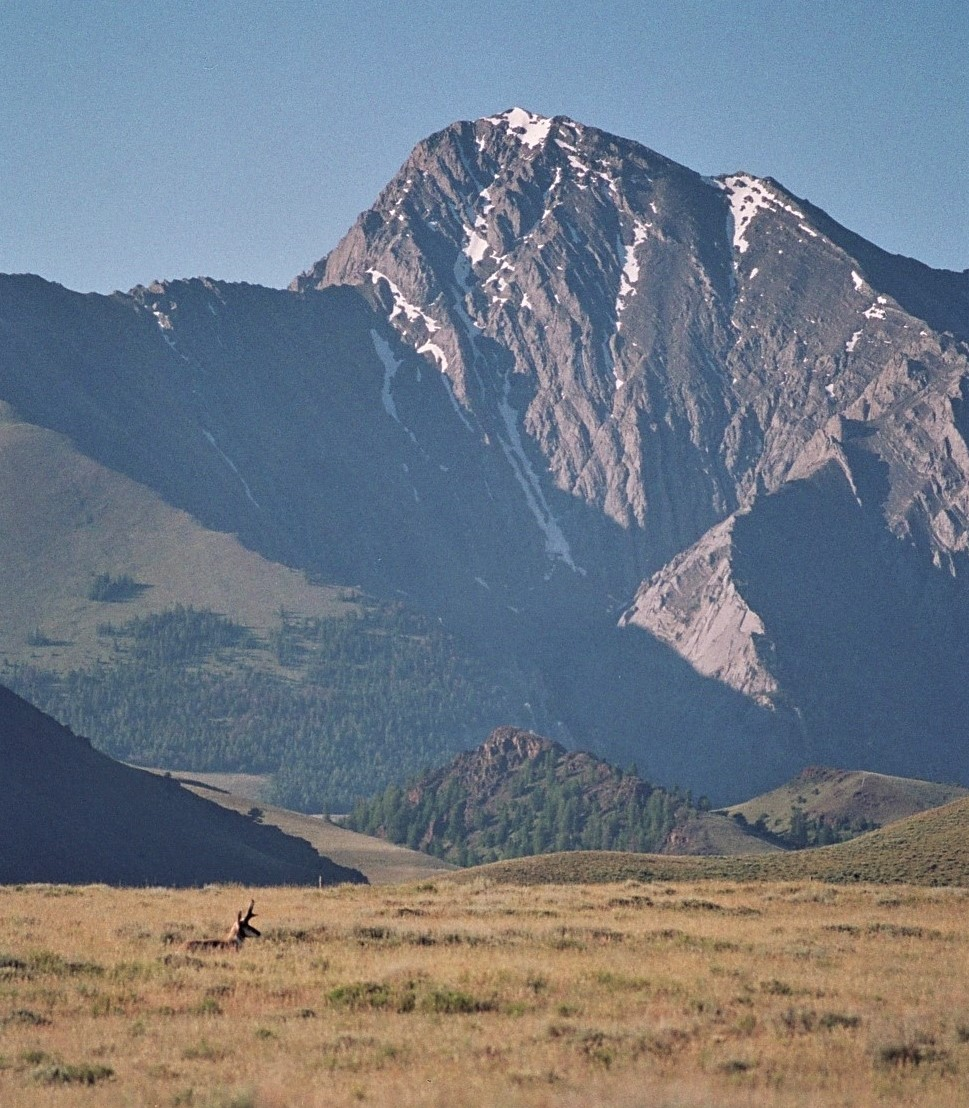
Mt. Corruption

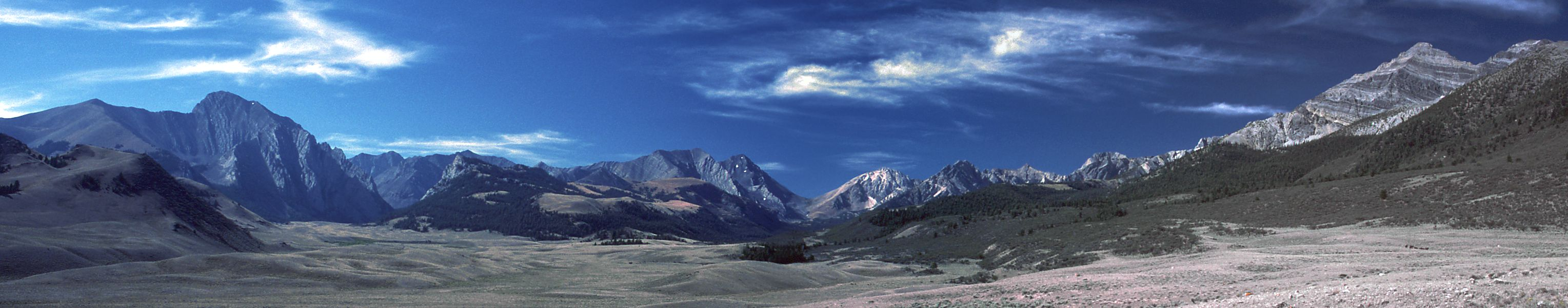
Lost River Range. Mount Corruption is the prominent peak to the left
