= White Cap Peak =

Mountain in Idaho, United States

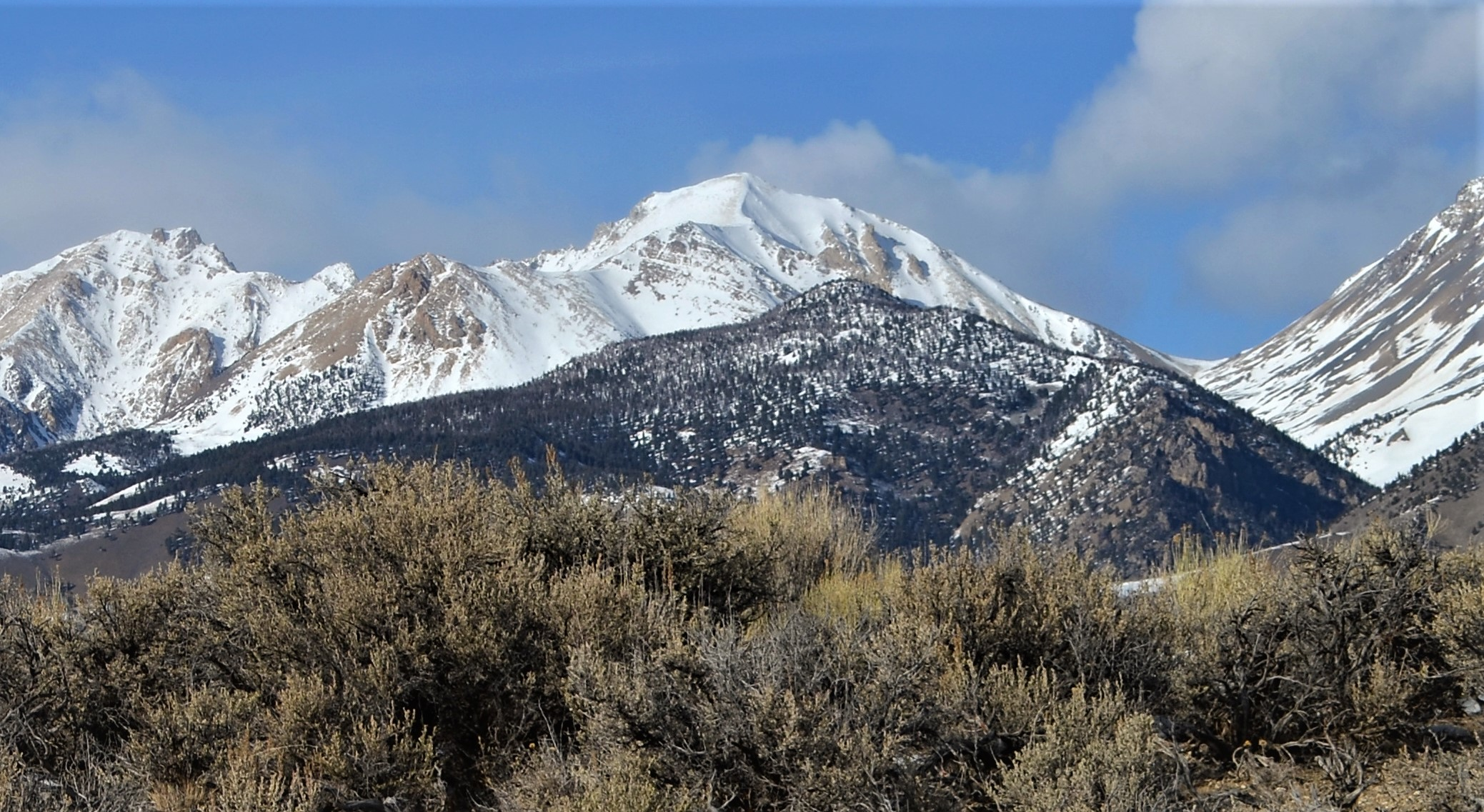
- South aspect, in winter

Highest point
- Elevation: 11,899 ft (3,627 m)
- Prominence: 619 ft (189 m)
- Parent peak: Leatherman Peak (12,228 ft)
- Isolation: 1.07 mi (1.72 km)
- Coordinates: 44°05′04″N 113°45′16″W

Geography
- Location within Idaho Location within the United States
- Location: Salmon–Challis National Forest
- Country: United States of America
- State: Idaho
- County: Custer
- Parent range: Lost River Range; Rocky Mountains
- Topo map: USGS Elkhorn Creek

Geology
- Rock age: Mississippian
- Mountain type: Fault block
- Rock type: Limestone

Climbing
- Easiest route: class 2 hiking

White Cap Peak is an 11,899-foot elevation (3,627 m) mountain summit located in Custer County, Idaho, United States.

== Description ==
White Cap Peak ranks as the 18th-highest peak in Idaho and is part of the Lost River Range which is a subset of the Rocky Mountains. The mountain is set on land managed by Salmon–Challis National Forest. Neighbors include Leatherman Peak, 1.1 mile to the east, Mount Morrison 2.6 miles to the northwest, Little Regret Peak 3.55 miles east, and Borah Peak, the highest peak in Idaho, is 3.9 miles to the north-northwest. Leatherman Pass, elevation 10,512 ft, is the low point of the saddle midway between White Cap Peak and Leatherman Peak. Precipitation runoff from the mountain's slopes drains southwest to Big Lost River and northeast into headwaters of West Fork Pahsimeroi River. Topographic relief is significant as the summit rises 5,600 feet (1,700 meters) in four miles above Highway 93 in Big Lost River Valley, and 1,800 feet (550 meters) above Pass Lake in less than one-half mile.

== Climate ==
Based on the Köppen climate classification, White Cap Peak is located in an alpine subarctic climate zone with long, cold, snowy winters, and cool to warm summers. Winter temperatures can drop below −10 °F with wind chill factors below −30 °F.

== See also ==
- List of mountain peaks of Idaho

== Gallery ==
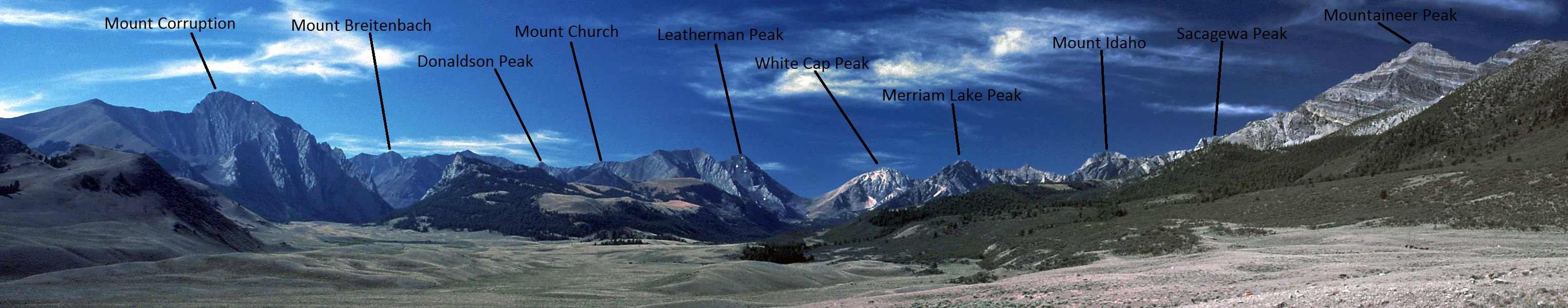
Lost River Range, White Cap Peak centered

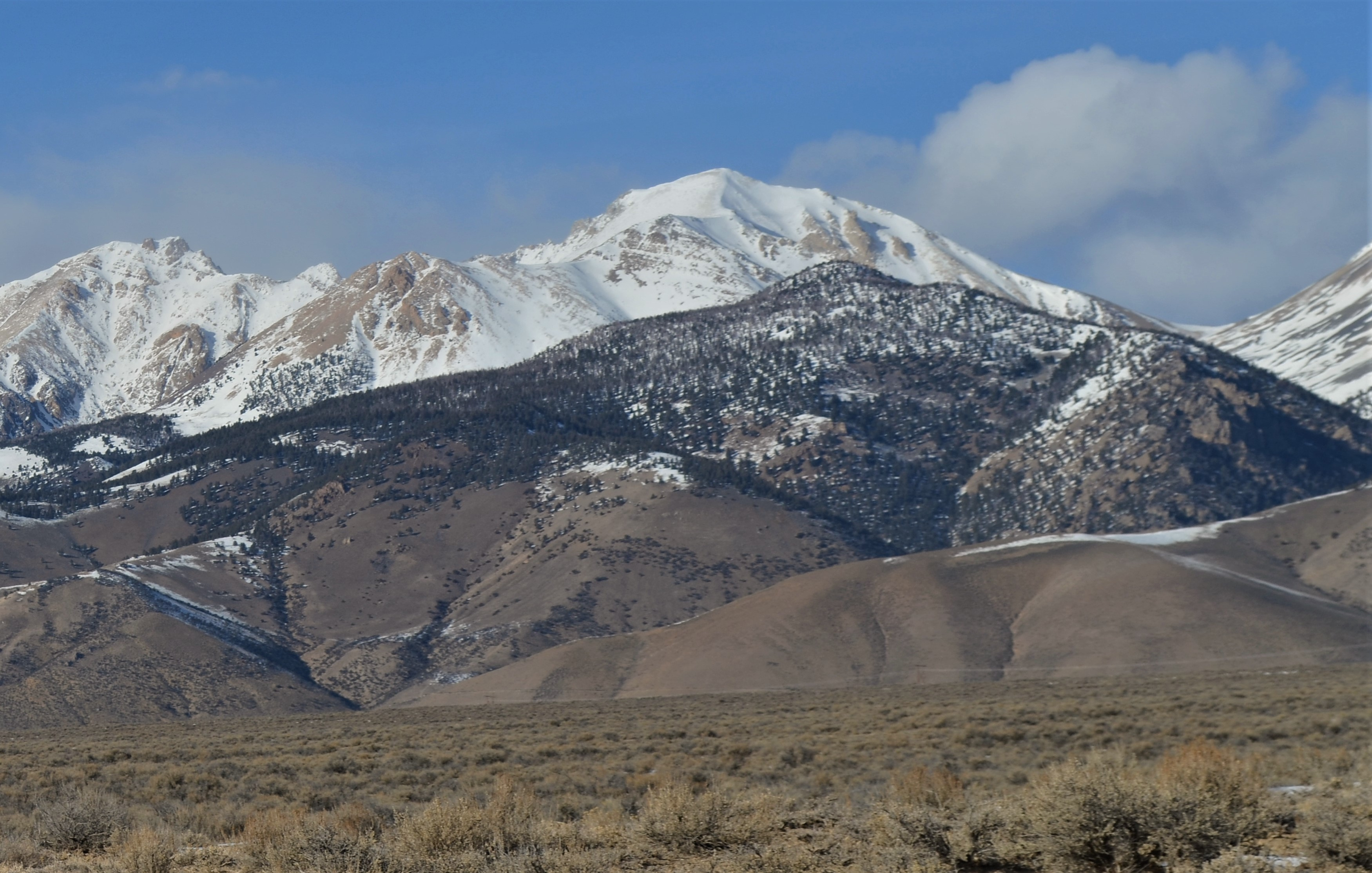
South aspect

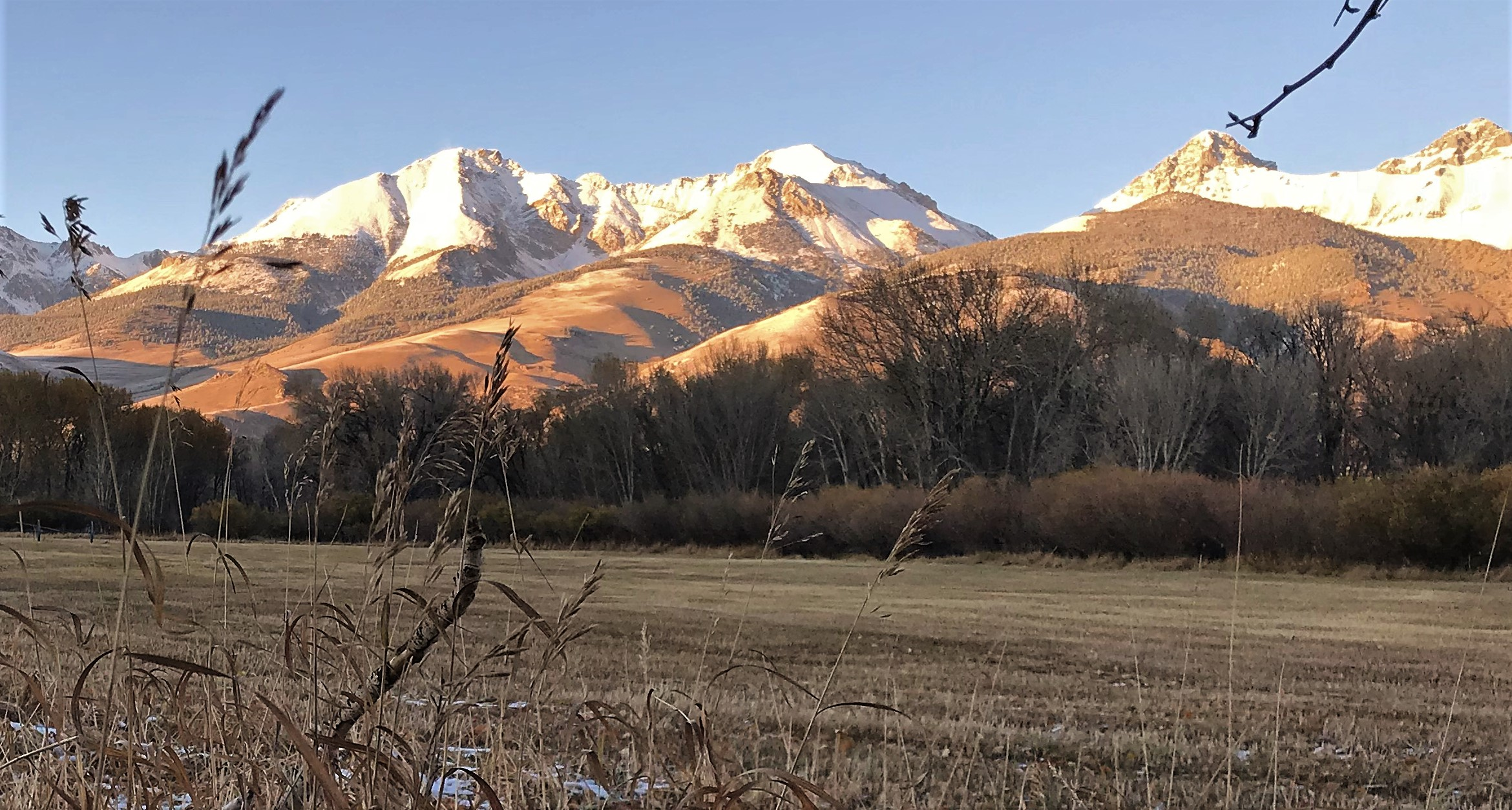
White Cap Peak centered
