= Little Regret Peak =

Mountain in Idaho, United States

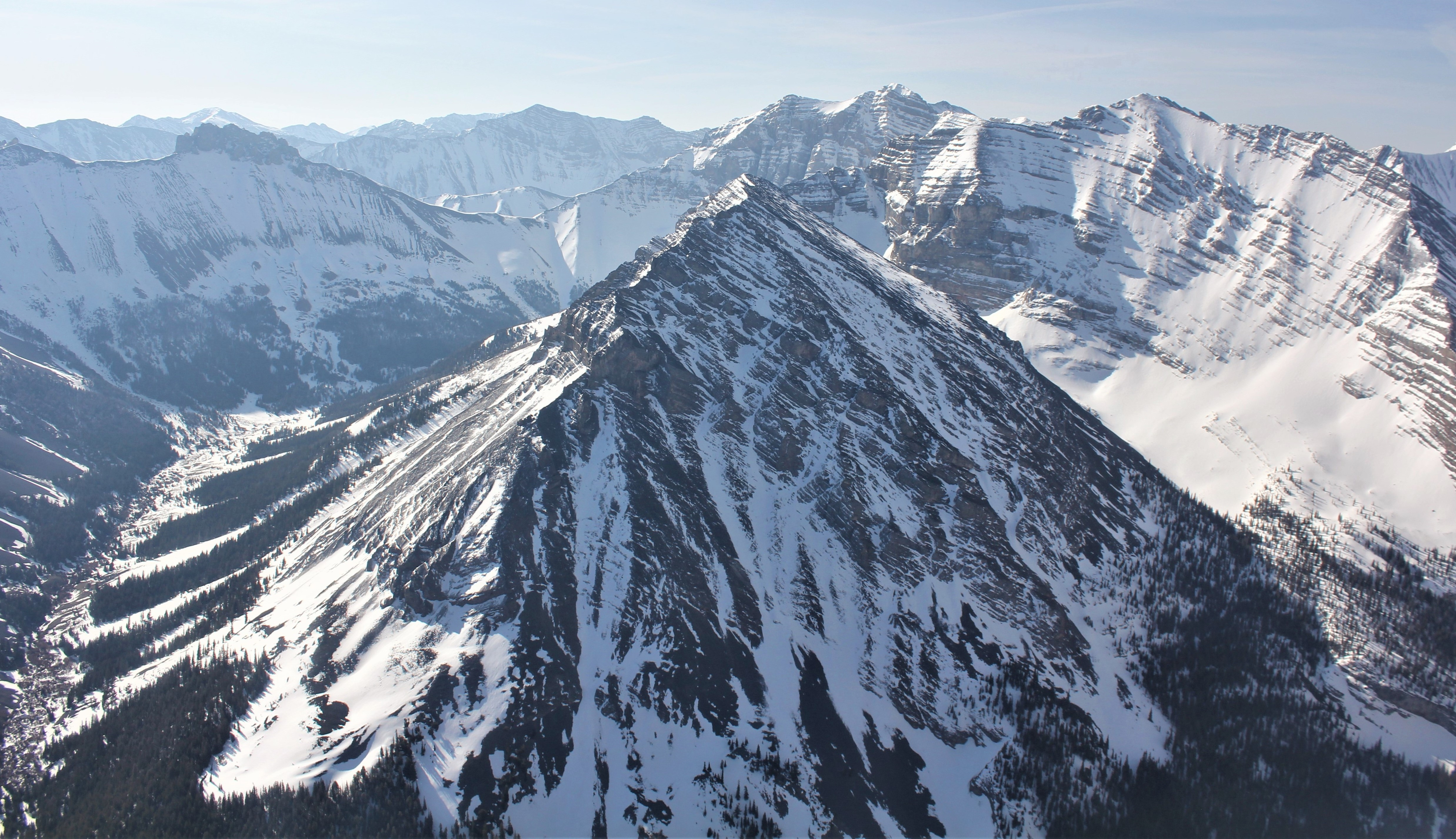
- North aspect, aerial view

Highest point
- Elevation: 11,090 ft (3,380 m)
- Prominence: 310 ft (94 m)
- Parent peak: Mount Breitenbach (12,140 ft)
- Isolation: 1.60 mi (2.57 km)
- Coordinates: 44°05′12″N 113°41′00″W

Geography
- Location within Idaho Location within the United States
- Location: Salmon–Challis National Forest
- Country: United States of America
- State: Idaho
- County: Custer
- Parent range: Lost River Range; Rocky Mountains
- Topo map: USGS Leatherman Peak

Geology
- Rock age: Mississippian
- Mountain type: Fault block
- Rock type: Limestone

Climbing
- First ascent: 2005 by Rick Baugher
- Easiest route: class 3 scrambling

Little Regret Peak is an 11,090-foot elevation (3,380 m) mountain summit located in Custer County, Idaho, United States.

== Description ==
Little Regret Peak is part of the Lost River Range which is a subset of the Rocky Mountains. The mountain is set on land managed by Salmon–Challis National Forest. Neighbors include No Regret Peak one mile south, line parent Mount Breitenbach, 1.75 mile south-southeast, Mount Corruption two miles north, Leatherman Peak three miles to the west, and Borah Peak, the highest peak in Idaho, is seven miles to the northwest. Precipitation runoff from the mountain's slopes drains to Pahsimeroi River. Topographic relief is significant as the summit rises 2,700 feet (820 meters) above the East Fork Pahsimeroi in one mile.

== Climate ==
Based on the Köppen climate classification, Little Regret Peak is located in an alpine subarctic climate zone with long, cold, snowy winters, and cool to warm summers. Winter temperatures can drop below −10 °F with wind chill factors below −30 °F.

== See also ==
- List of mountain peaks of Idaho
