= Mount McCaleb =

Mountain in Idaho, United States

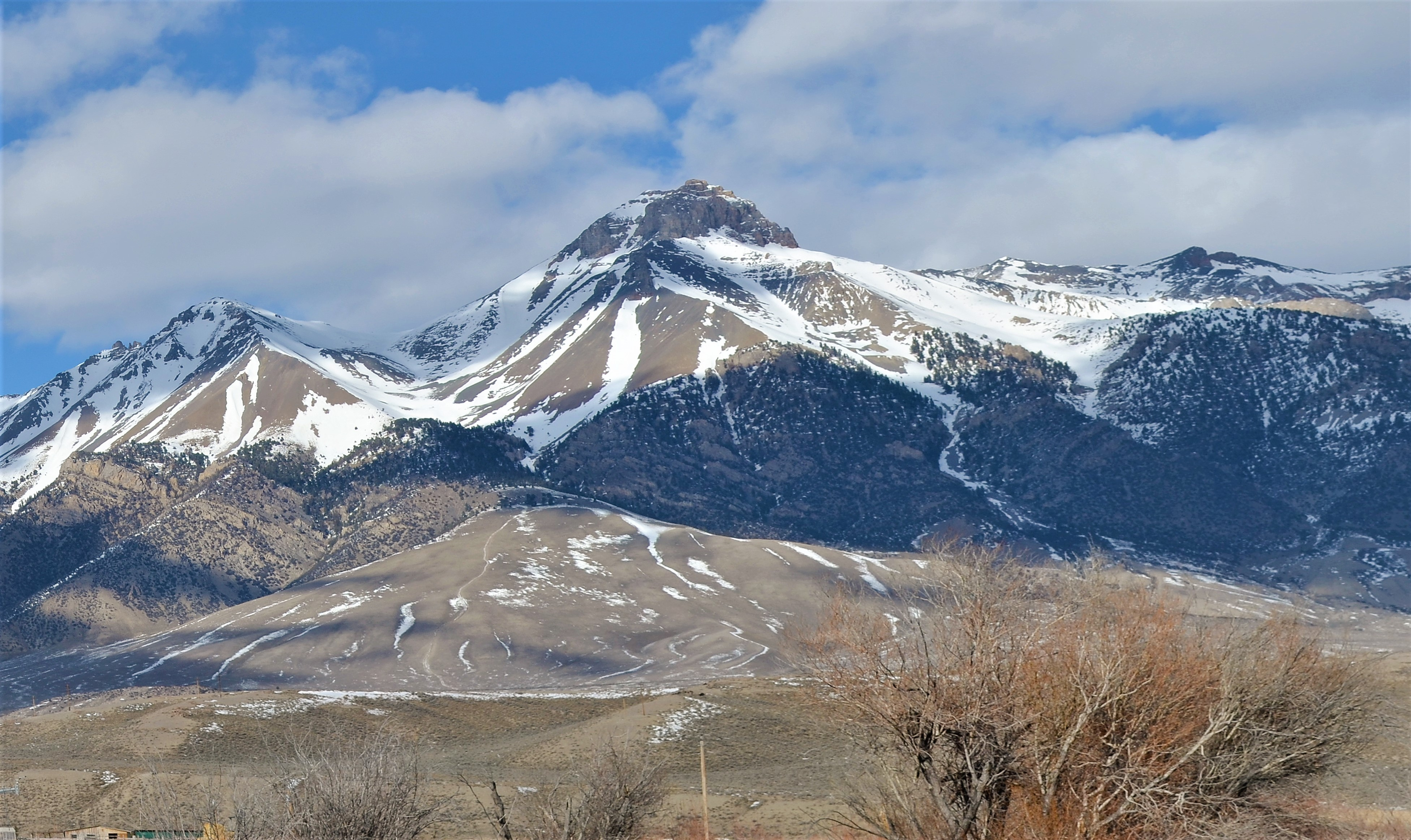
- South aspect, in winter

Highest point
- Elevation: 11,682 ft (3,561 m)
- Prominence: 682 ft (208 m)
- Parent peak: USGS Peak (11,982 ft) (aka McCaleb Benchmark)
- Isolation: 1.56 mi (2.51 km)
- Coordinates: 43°59′38″N 113°35′53″W

Naming
- Etymology: Capt. Jesse Burton McCaleb

Geography
- Location within Idaho Location within the United States
- Location: Salmon–Challis National Forest
- Country: United States of America
- State: Idaho
- County: Custer
- Parent range: Lost River Range; Rocky Mountains
- Topo map: USGS Mackay

Geology
- Rock age: Mississippian
- Mountain type: Fault block
- Rock type: Limestone

Climbing
- First ascent: 1884 by J.D. Martin
- Easiest route: class 3 scrambling

Mount McCaleb is an 11,682-foot elevation (3,561 m) mountain summit located in Custer County, Idaho, United States.

== Description ==
Mount McCaleb ranks as the 33rd-highest peak in Idaho and is part of the Lost River Range which is a subset of the Rocky Mountains. The mountain is set on land managed by Salmon–Challis National Forest and the peak overlooks the town of Mackay which is situated 6.5 miles south of the peak. Neighbors include Mount Breitenbach, 6.6 miles to the northwest, line parent USGS Peak 1.6 mile to the northeast, and Borah Peak, the highest peak in Idaho, is 13 miles to the northwest. Precipitation runoff from the mountain's slopes drains to Big Lost River. Topographic relief is significant as the summit rises 5,000 feet (1,500 meters) above Big Lost River Valley in three miles.

== Etymology ==
This mountain's toponym has been officially adopted by the United States Board on Geographic Names. The name honors Jesse McCaleb (1837–1878), heroic pioneer, merchant from Challis, and business associate of George L. Shoup. Jesse McCaleb was killed August 11, 1878, during an attack by Indians north of Mackay below this mountain which now bears his name.

== Climate ==
Based on the Köppen climate classification, Mt. McCaleb is located in an alpine subarctic climate zone with long, cold, snowy winters, and cool to warm summers. Winter temperatures can drop below −10 °F with wind chill factors below −30 °F.

== Gallery ==
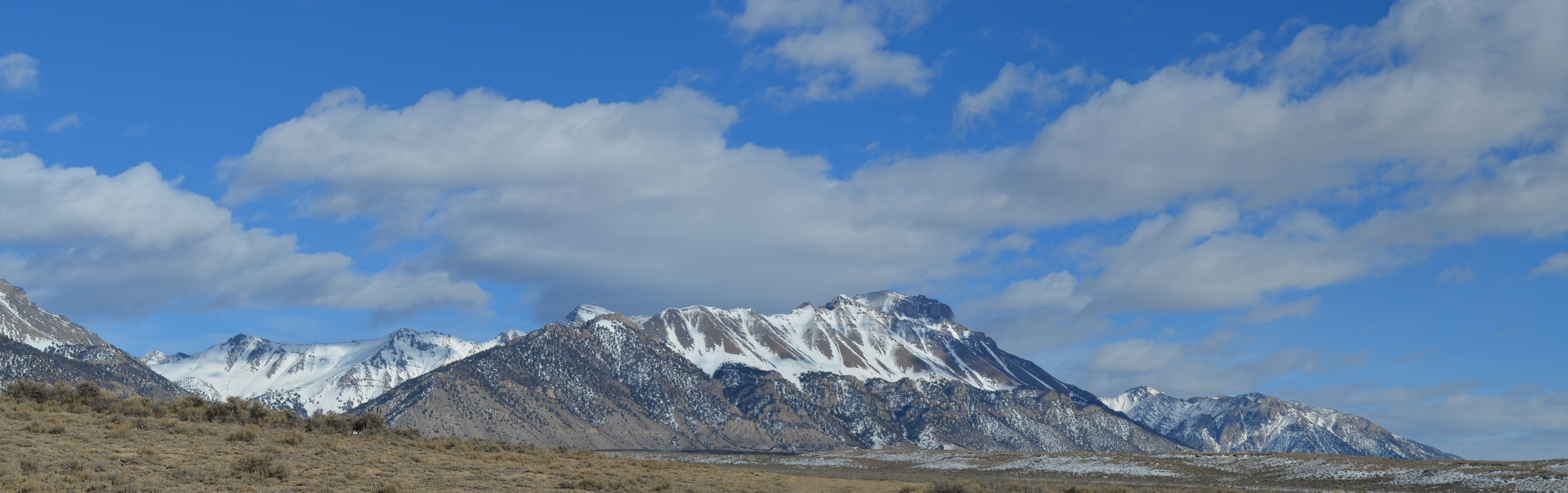
West aspect

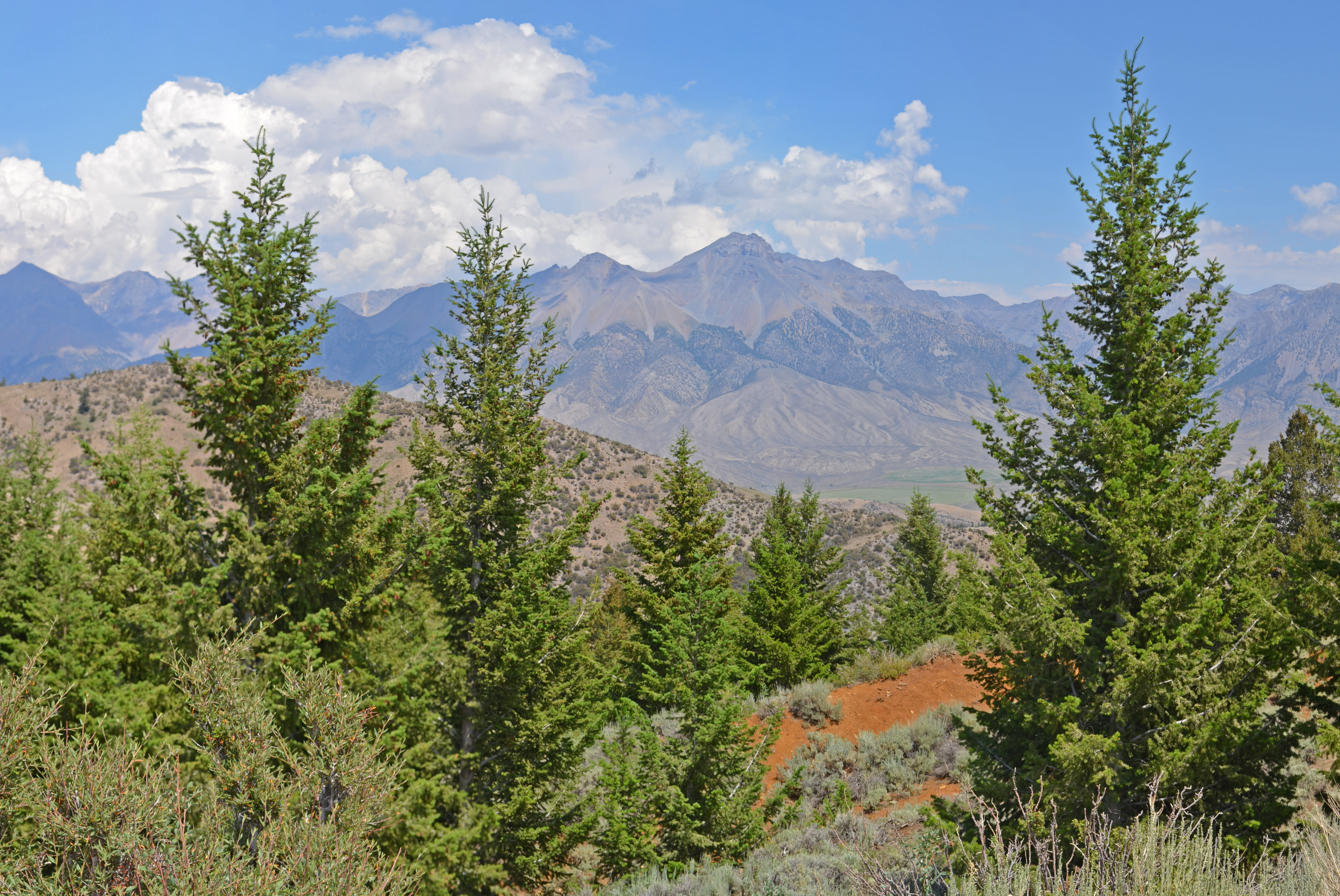
South aspect

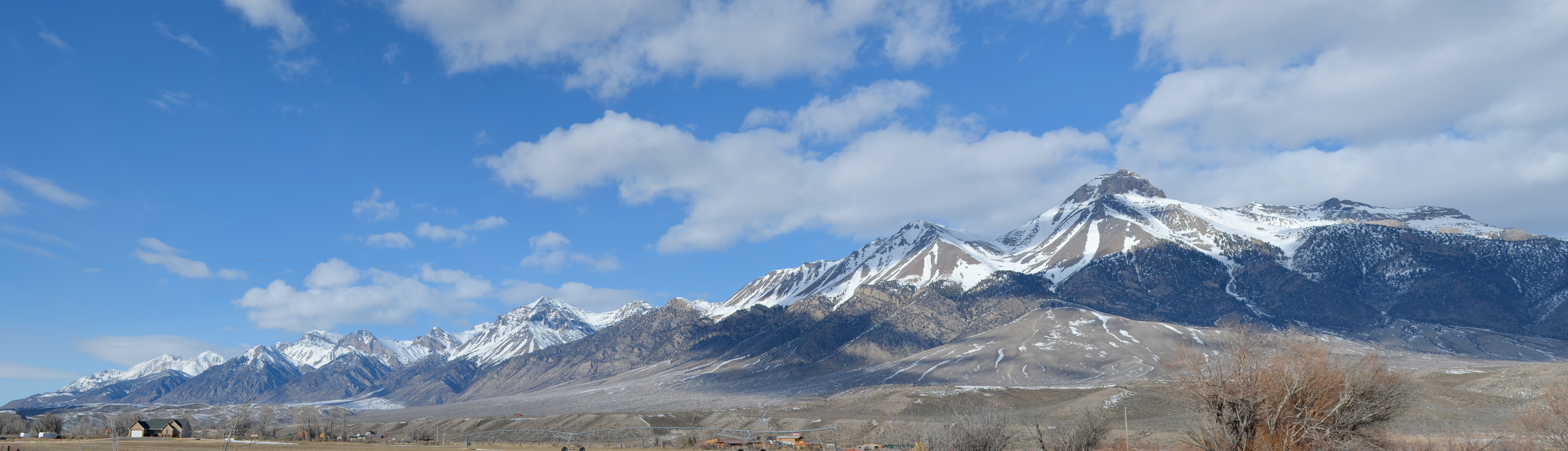
Mt. McCaleb to the right

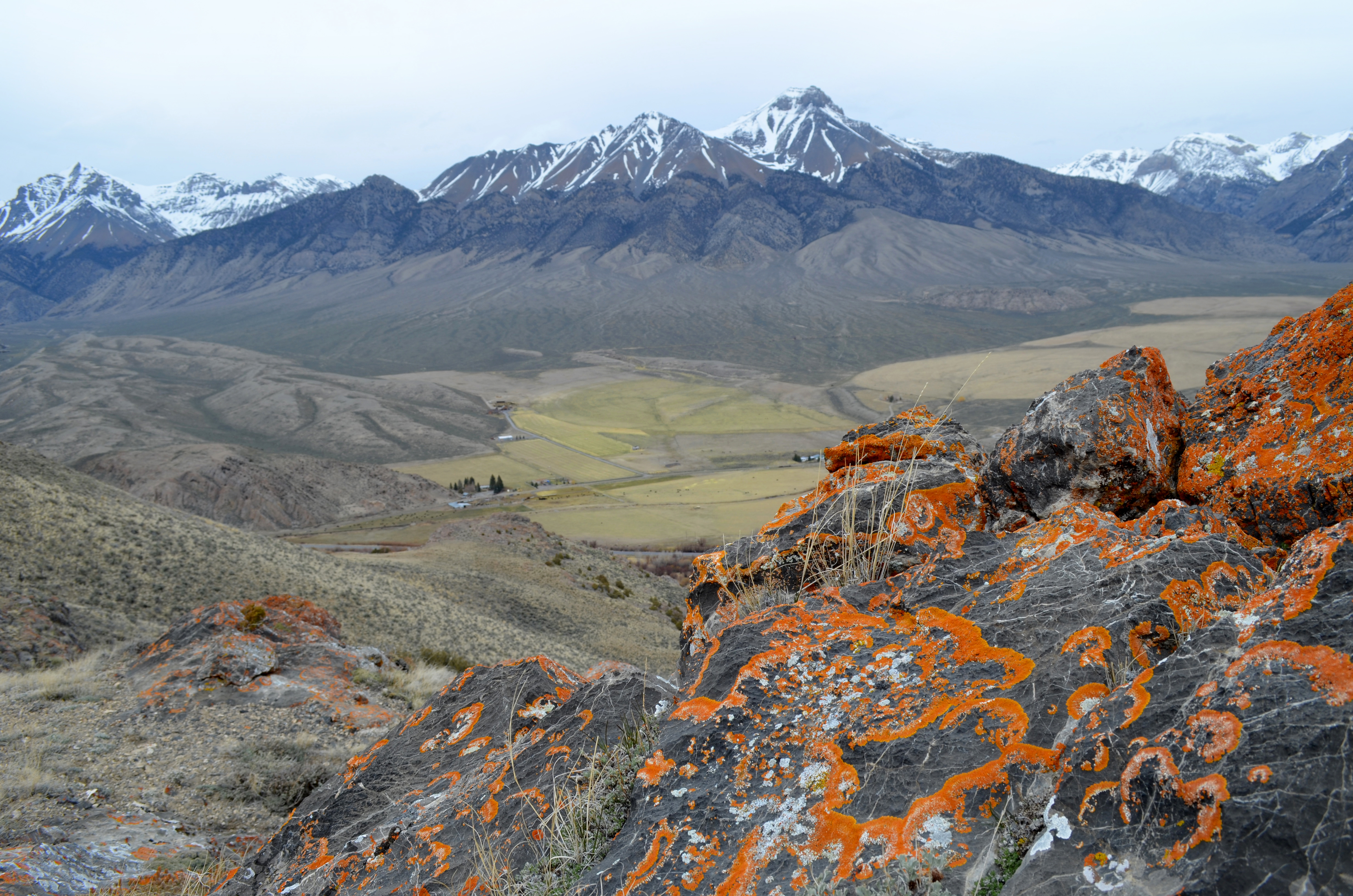
Mt. McCaleb in the distance

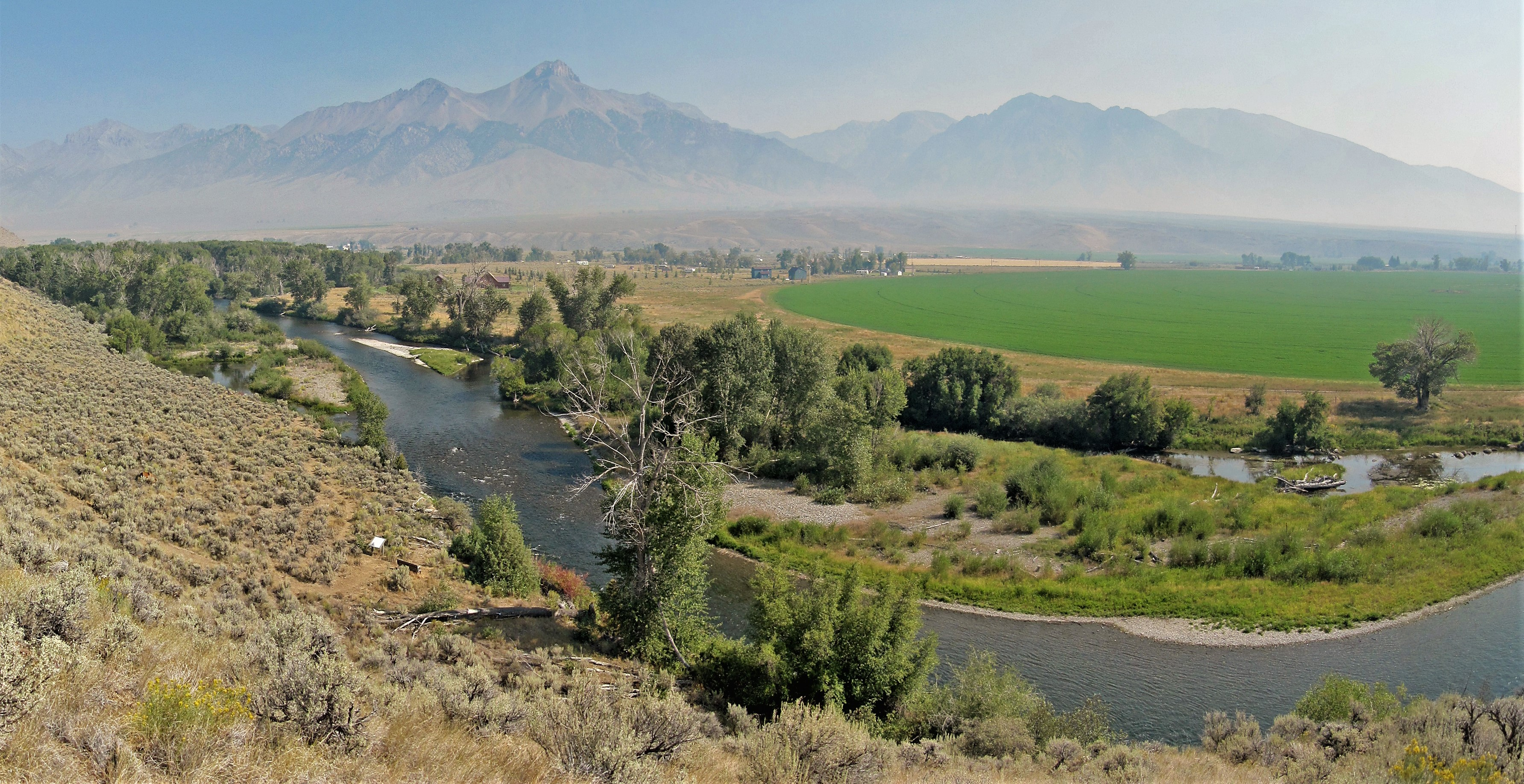
Mount McCaleb and Big Lost River Valley

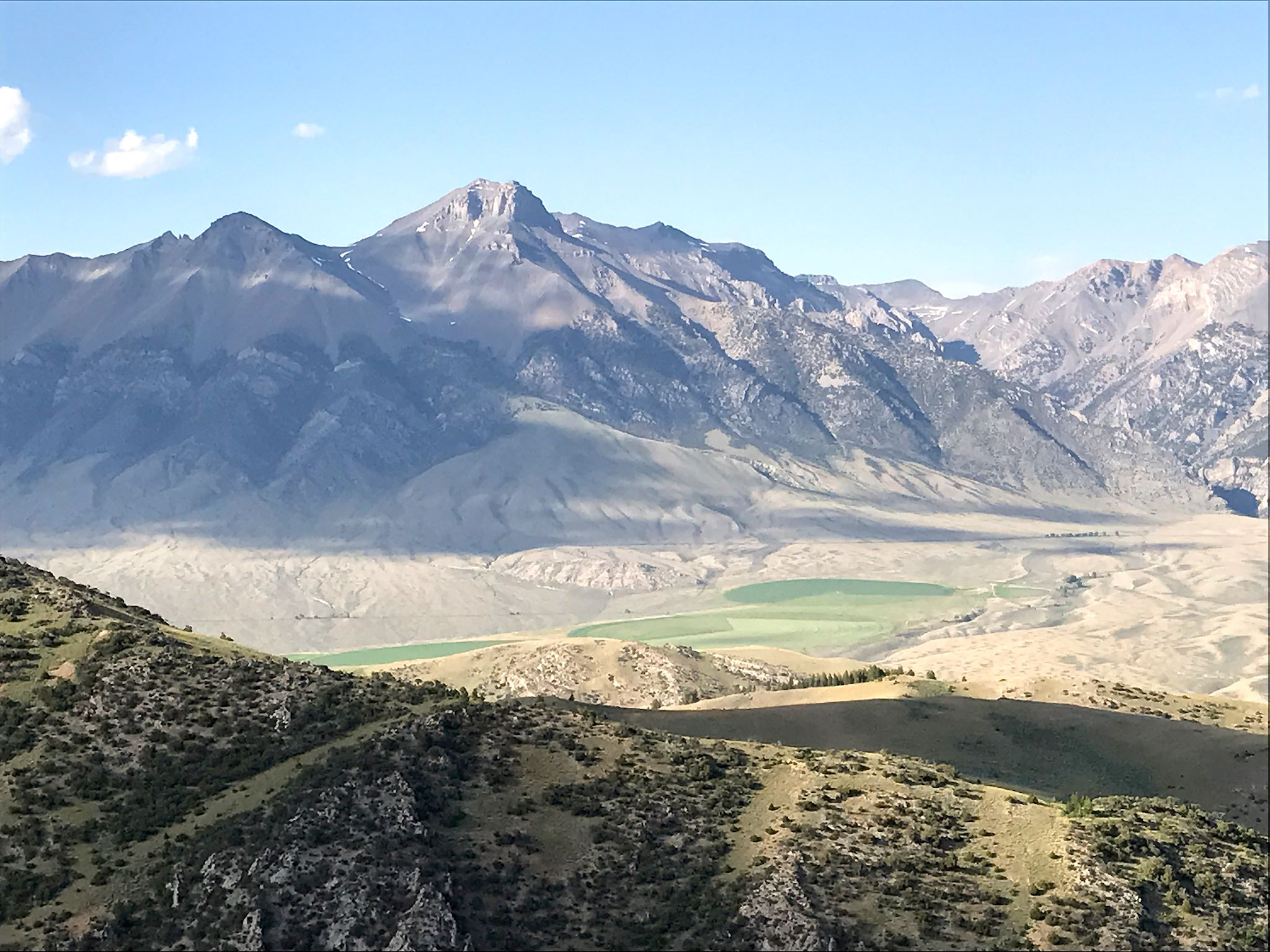
Mt. McCaleb

== See also ==
- List of mountain peaks of Idaho
