= Mount Idaho (mountain) =

Mountain in Idaho, United States

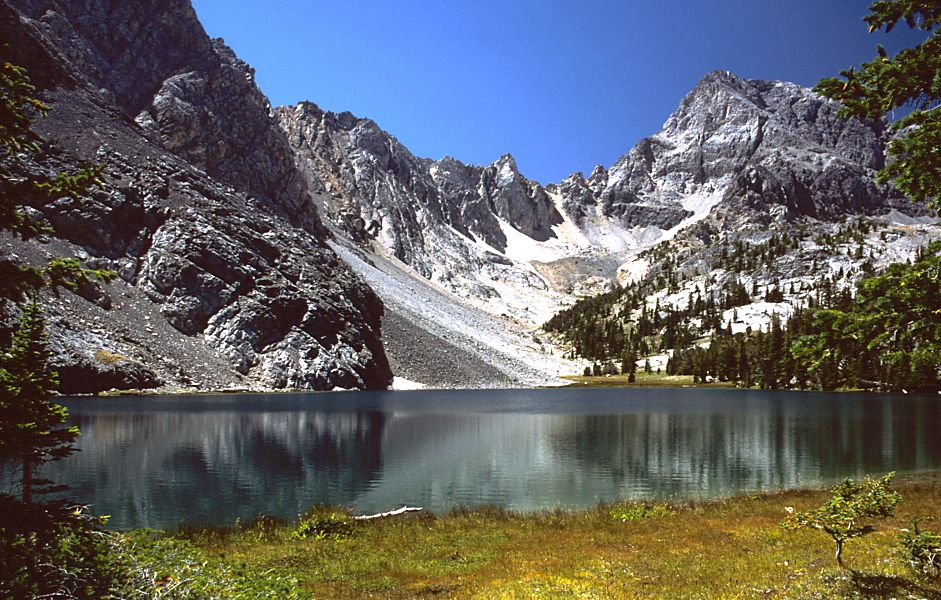
- Mount Idaho and Merriam Lake

Highest point
- Elevation: 12,065 ft (3,677 m)
- Prominence: 1,065 ft (325 m)
- Parent peak: Borah Peak
- Coordinates: 44°06′22″N 113°46′40″W

Geography
- Location within Idaho
- Location: Custer County, Idaho, U.S.
- Parent range: Lost River Range
- Topo map: USGS Elkhorn Creek

Climbing
- Easiest route: Scramble, class 3

Mount Idaho, at 12,065 feet (3,677 m) above sea level is the seventh highest peak in Idaho and the sixth highest in the Lost River Range. The peak is located in Salmon-Challis National Forest in Custer Countyin the US State of the same name. It is 2.2 mi (3.5 km) south of Borah Peak, its line parent, and 2.8 mi (4.5 km) northwest of Leatherman Peak. Merriam Lake is in the basin to the northeast of the peak.

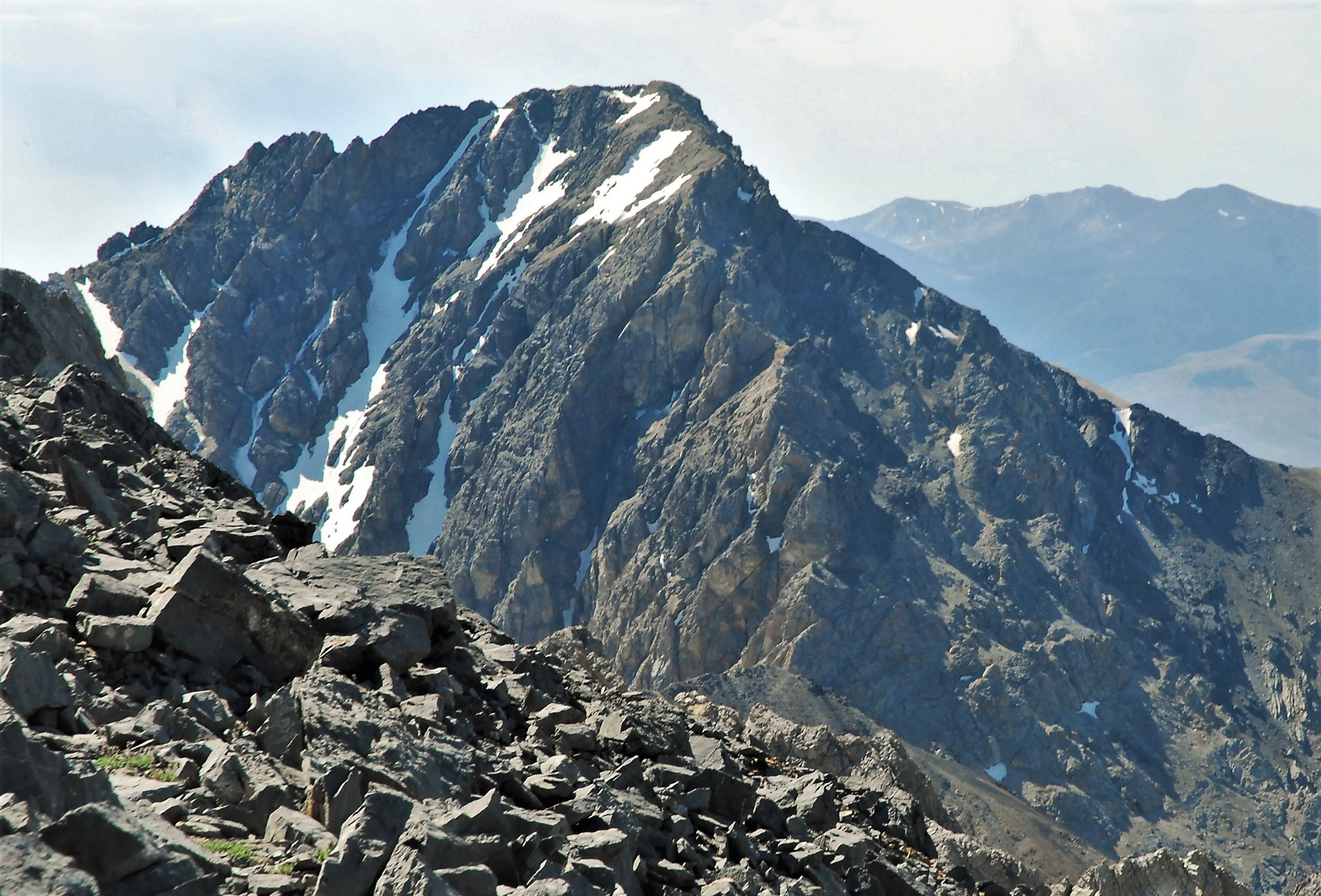
North aspect of Mt. Idaho viewed en route to Borah Peak
