= No Regret Peak =

Mountain in the state of Idaho

- Location within Idaho

Highest point
- Elevation: 11,972 ft (3,649 m)
- Prominence: 252 ft (77 m)
- Parent peak: Mount Breitenbach
- Coordinates: 44°04′15″N 113°41′18″W

Geography
- Location: Custer County, Idaho, U.S.
- Parent range: Lost River Range
- Topo map: USGS Leatherman Peak

No Regret Peak, at 11,972 feet (3,649 m) above sea level, is the eleventh-highest peak in the U.S. state of Idaho and the ninth-highest in the Lost River Range. The peak is located in Salmon-Challis National Forest in Custer County. It is 0.85 mi (1.37 km) northwest of Mount Breitenbach, its line parent, 0.8 mi (1.3 km) northeast of Donaldson Peak, and 1.3 mi (2.1 km) east of Mount Church.

== See also ==
- Little Regret Peak
- List of mountain peaks of Idaho
