= USGS Peak =

Mountain in Idaho, United States

- Location within Idaho

Highest point
- Elevation: 11,982 ft (3,652 m)
- Prominence: 1,782 ft (543 m)
- Parent peak: Mount Church
- Coordinates: 44°00′48″N 113°34′55″W

Geography
- Location: Custer County, Idaho, U.S.
- Parent range: Lost River Range
- Topo map: USGS Massacre Mountain

Climbing
- Easiest route: Scrambling, class 3

USGS Peak, at 11,982 feet (3,652 m) above sea level, is the eleventh-highest peak in the U.S. state of Idaho and the ninth-highest in the Lost River Range. The peak is located in Salmon-Challis National Forest in Custer County. It is 1.6 miles (2.6 km) northeast of Mount McCaleb and 4.15 miles (6.68 km) southeast of Lost River Peak, its line parent.

== Climate ==
Climate data for USGS Peak 44.0073 N, 113.5830 W, Elevation: 11,316 ft (3,449 m) (1991–2020 normals)
Month	Jan	Feb	Mar	Apr	May	Jun	Jul	Aug	Sep	Oct	Nov	Dec	Year
Mean daily maximum °F (°C)	20.4 (−6.4)	19.8 (−6.8)	24.0 (−4.4)	28.9 (−1.7)	38.6 (3.7)	48.7 (9.3)	60.2 (15.7)	59.7 (15.4)	50.7 (10.4)	37.5 (3.1)	25.3 (−3.7)	19.4 (−7.0)	36.1 (2.3)
Daily mean °F (°C)	12.4 (−10.9)	10.7 (−11.8)	14.1 (−9.9)	18.3 (−7.6)	27.2 (−2.7)	36.3 (2.4)	46.6 (8.1)	46.0 (7.8)	37.6 (3.1)	26.6 (−3.0)	17.1 (−8.3)	11.7 (−11.3)	25.4 (−3.7)
Mean daily minimum °F (°C)	4.4 (−15.3)	1.7 (−16.8)	4.2 (−15.4)	7.7 (−13.5)	15.8 (−9.0)	23.9 (−4.5)	33.0 (0.6)	32.4 (0.2)	24.4 (−4.2)	15.7 (−9.1)	9.0 (−12.8)	3.9 (−15.6)	14.7 (−9.6)
Average precipitation inches (mm)	3.76 (96)	4.11 (104)	4.78 (121)	3.32 (84)	3.47 (88)	2.80 (71)	1.63 (41)	1.69 (43)	2.19 (56)	3.08 (78)	3.30 (84)	4.41 (112)	38.54 (978)
Source: PRISM Climate Group
