= Doublespring Peak =

Mountain in Idaho, United States

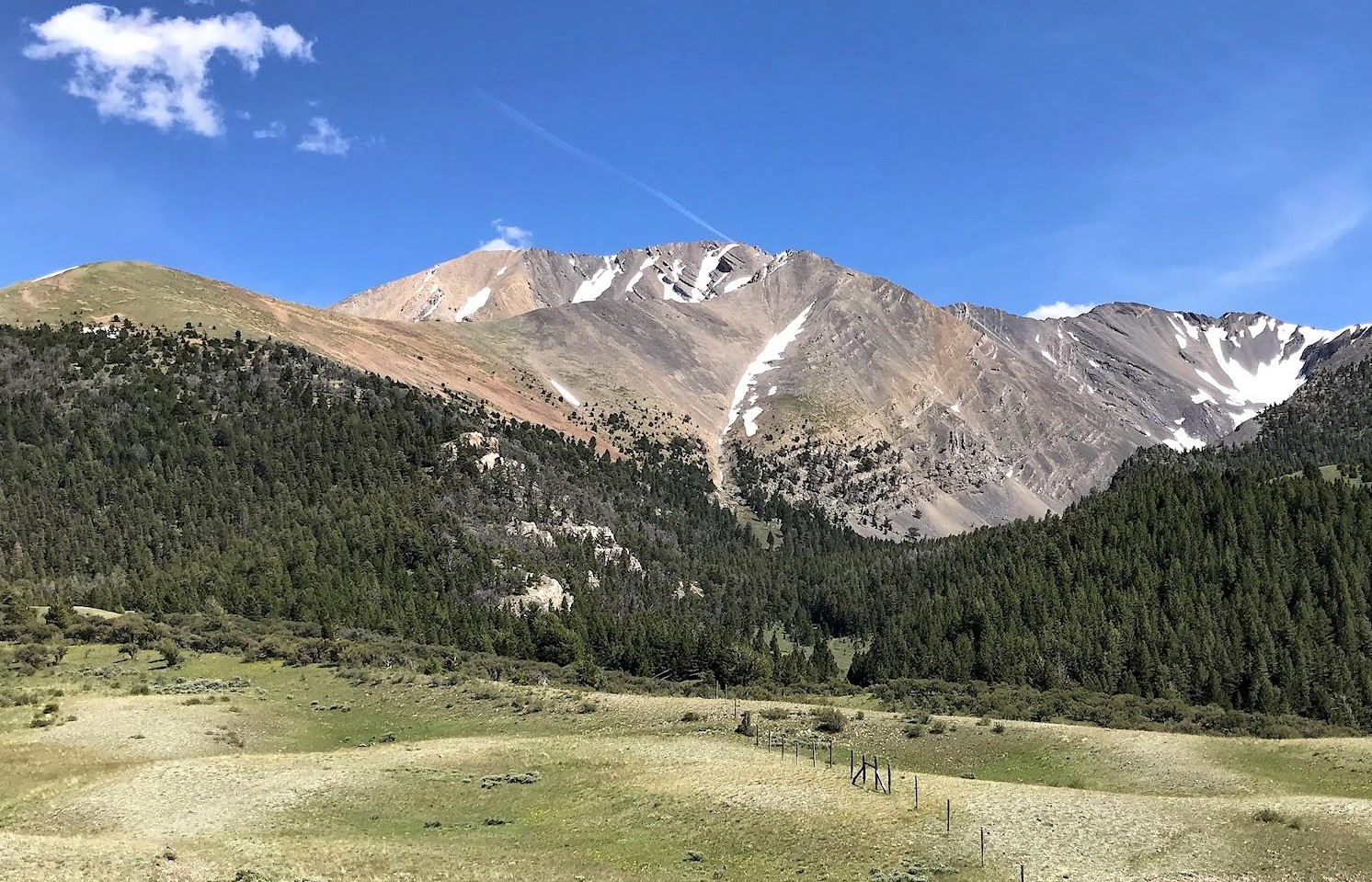
- West aspect

Highest point
- Elevation: 11,611 ft (3,539 m)
- Prominence: 2,129 ft (649 m)
- Parent peak: Borah Peak (12,662 ft)
- Isolation: 4.06 mi (6.53 km)
- Coordinates: 44°12′16″N 113°48′01″W

Geography
- Location within Idaho Location within the United States
- Location: Salmon–Challis National Forest
- Country: United States of America
- State: Idaho
- County: Custer
- Parent range: Lost River Range; Rocky Mountains
- Topo map: USGS Borah Peak

Geology
- Rock age: Mississippian
- Mountain type: Fault block
- Rock type: Limestone

Climbing
- Easiest route: class 2 hiking North Ridge

Doublespring Peak is an 11,611-foot elevation (3,539 m) mountain summit located in Custer County, Idaho, United States.

== Description ==
Doublespring Peak ranks as the 41st-highest peak in Idaho and is part of the Lost River Range which is a subset of the Rocky Mountains. The mountain is set on land managed by Salmon–Challis National Forest. Neighbors include Dickey Peak 4.5 miles northwest, Mount Morrison, eight miles south, and line parent Borah Peak, the highest peak in Idaho, is 4.7 miles to the south. Precipitation runoff from the mountain's slopes drains to Willow Creek, Doublespring Creek, and to the Pahsimeroi River. Topographic relief is significant as the summit rises 4,200 feet (1,300 meters) above Willow Creek in three miles. This landform is unofficially named in association with nearby Doublespring Pass and Doublespring Creek which are both official toponyms adopted by the United States Board on Geographic Names.

== Climate ==
Based on the Köppen climate classification, Doublespring Peak is located in an alpine subarctic climate zone with long, cold, snowy winters, and cool to warm summers. Winter temperatures can drop below −10 °F with wind chill factors below −30 °F.

== See also ==
- List of mountain peaks of Idaho

== Gallery ==
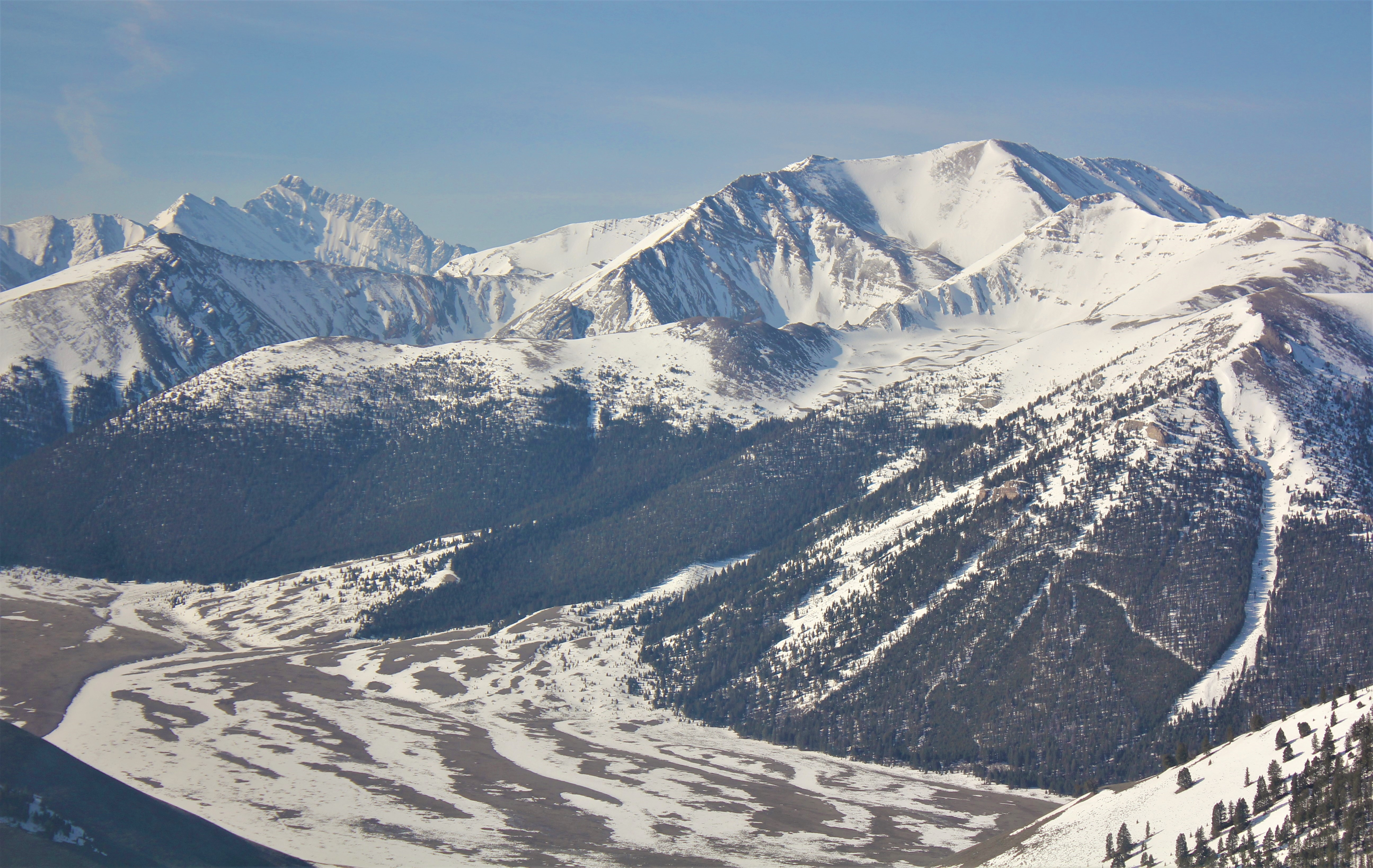
Aerial view of Borah Peak (left) and Doublespring Peak (upper right)

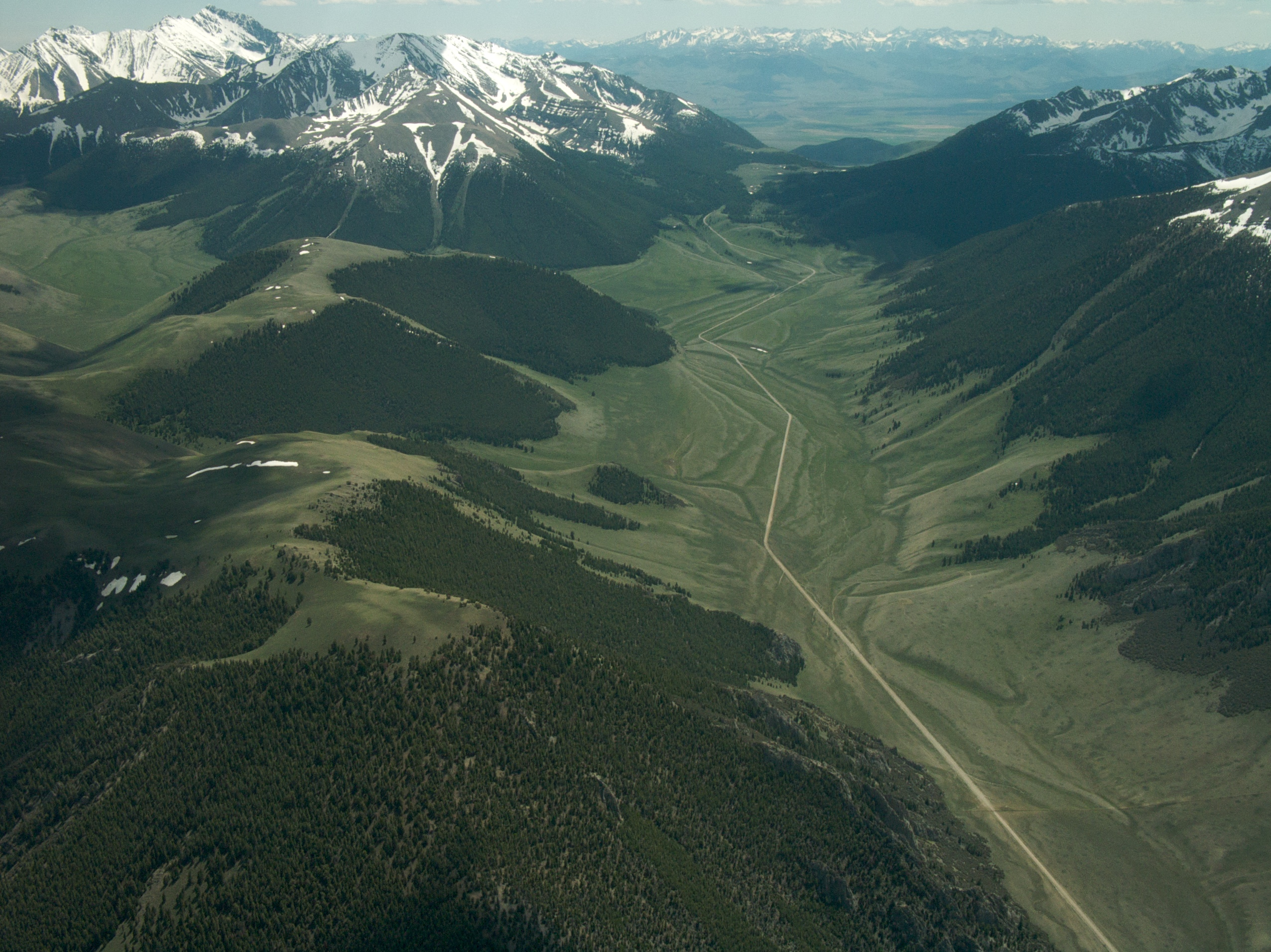
Aerial view of Borah Peak (upper left), Doublespring Peak, Doublespring Pass, and Doublespring Creek valley
