= Dickey Peak (disambiguation) =

Dickey Peak may refer to:

- Dickey Peak, a mountain in the Ellsworth Mountains, Antarctica
- Dickey Peak (Idaho), a mountain in Custer County, Idaho
