= Mount Idaho =

Mount Idaho can refer to the following features in Idaho, United States:

- Mount Idaho (mountain), a peak in the Lost River Range
- Mount Idaho, Idaho, a ghost town
