= Mount Church =

Mount Church could mean:

- Mount Church (Alaska), a peak of the Alaska Range
- Mount Church (Idaho), a peak in the Lost River Range
- Mount Church (Washington), a peak in the southern Olympic Mountains
- Mount Church (Virginia), a historic church built during colonial times that became part of Rappahannock Academy school
