= Mackay, Idaho =

- Town
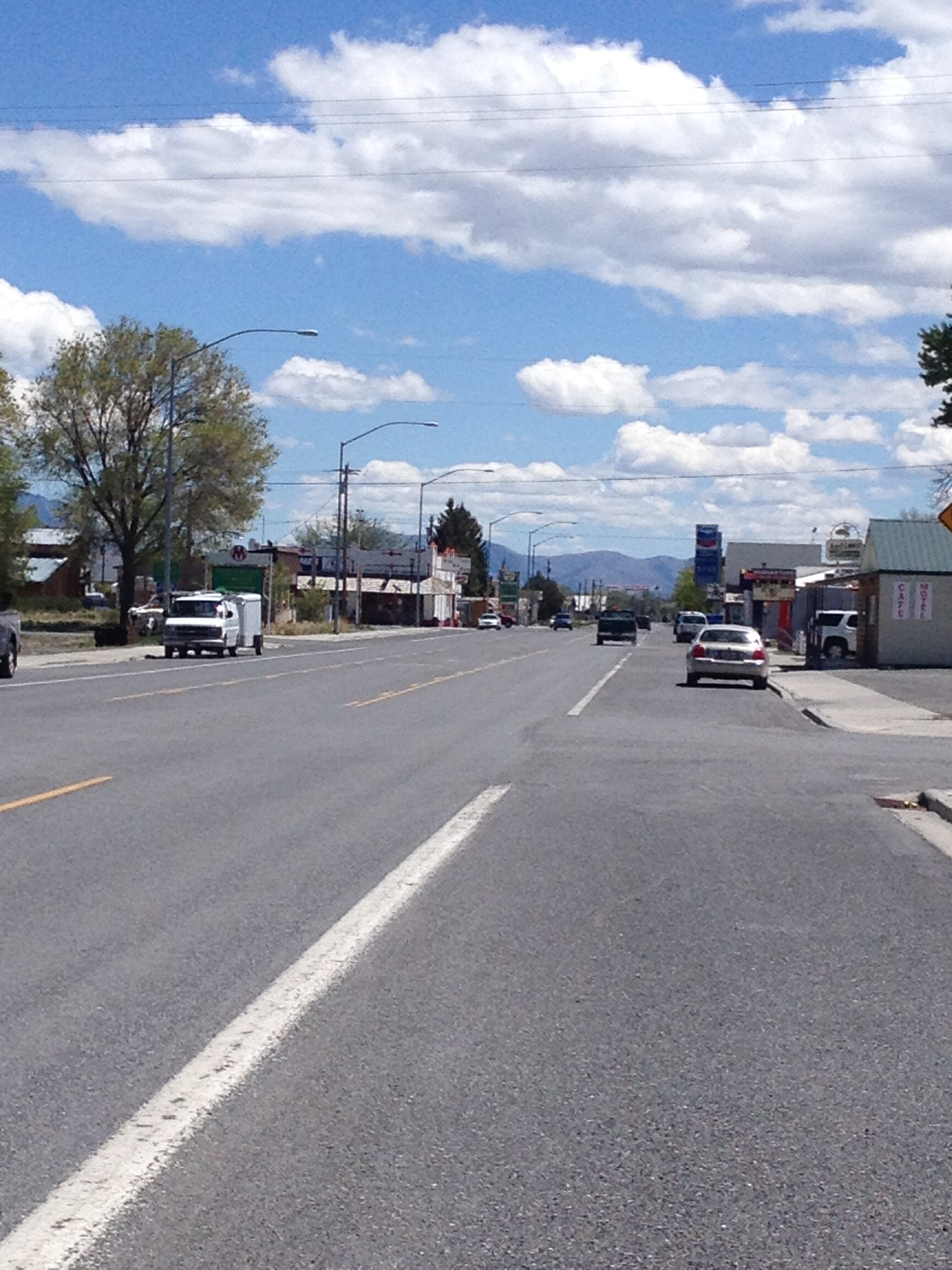

- Location of Mackay in Custer County, Idaho.
- Coordinates: 43°54′45″N 113°37′12″W
- Country: United States
- State: Idaho
- County: Custer

Area
  - Total: 0.86 sq mi (2.24 km^{2})
  - Land: 0.86 sq mi (2.24 km^{2})
  - Water: 0 sq mi (0.00 km^{2})
- Elevation: 5,906 ft (1,800 m)

Population (2020)
  - Total: 439
  - Density: 508/sq mi (196/km^{2})
- Time zone: UTC-7 (Mountain (MST))
  - Summer (DST): UTC-6 (MDT)
- ZIP code: 83251
- Area code: 208
- FIPS code: 16-49240
- GNIS feature ID: 2410905
- Website: mackayidaho-city.com

Mackay (pronounced /ˈmækiː/) is a town in Custer County, Idaho, United States. The population was 439 at the 2020 census. The town is pronounced "Mackie" with the accent on the first syllable.

== Highways ==
- - US 93 - to Challis (north) and Arco (south)

== Etymology ==
The town was named in honor of John William Mackay who owned the local copper mines. The nearby Mackay Peak in the White Knob Mountains is also named after him.

== Geography ==
According to the United States Census Bureau, the city has a total area of 0.86 square miles (2.23 km^{2}), all of it land.

About 20 miles (32 km) north of Mackay is Idaho's highest mountain: Borah Peak, with a summit elevation of 12,662 feet (3,859 m). Mt. McCaleb, 11,427 feet (3,483 m), overlooks the city.

=== Climate ===
The climate of Mackay ranges from lows of −40 °F (−40 °C) to highs of +30 °F (−1 °C) in the winter. In the summer, temperatures range from lows of 30 °F (−1 °C) to highs of 100 °F (38 °C) in some areas. Mackay has a fairly dry climate, typical of high desert bordering alpine areas.

Climate data for Mackay, Idaho (Chilly Barton Flat), 1991–2020 normals, extremes 1948–present
| Month | Jan | Feb | Mar | Apr | May | Jun | Jul | Aug | Sep | Oct | Nov | Dec | Year |
|---|---|---|---|---|---|---|---|---|---|---|---|---|---|
| Record high °F (°C) | 50 (10) | 55 (13) | 68 (20) | 78 (26) | 88 (31) | 94 (34) | 100 (38) | 100 (38) | 93 (34) | 83 (28) | 67 (19) | 55 (13) | 100 (38) |
| Mean maximum °F (°C) | 41.8 (5.4) | 45.2 (7.3) | 57.2 (14.0) | 68.4 (20.2) | 76.9 (24.9) | 84.2 (29.0) | 90.9 (32.7) | 89.6 (32.0) | 83.2 (28.4) | 72.4 (22.4) | 56.0 (13.3) | 42.7 (5.9) | 91.9 (33.3) |
| Mean daily maximum °F (°C) | 30.5 (−0.8) | 33.7 (0.9) | 43.6 (6.4) | 52.9 (11.6) | 62.6 (17.0) | 71.8 (22.1) | 82.3 (27.9) | 80.4 (26.9) | 71.5 (21.9) | 57.3 (14.1) | 40.5 (4.7) | 29.8 (−1.2) | 54.7 (12.6) |
| Daily mean °F (°C) | 19.0 (−7.2) | 22.4 (−5.3) | 32.3 (0.2) | 40.3 (4.6) | 48.7 (9.3) | 56.5 (13.6) | 64.5 (18.1) | 62.6 (17.0) | 54.3 (12.4) | 42.8 (6.0) | 29.3 (−1.5) | 19.2 (−7.1) | 41.0 (5.0) |
| Mean daily minimum °F (°C) | 7.4 (−13.7) | 11.2 (−11.6) | 20.9 (−6.2) | 27.8 (−2.3) | 34.7 (1.5) | 41.3 (5.2) | 46.7 (8.2) | 44.7 (7.1) | 37.2 (2.9) | 28.2 (−2.1) | 18.1 (−7.7) | 8.6 (−13.0) | 27.2 (−2.6) |
| Mean minimum °F (°C) | −13.9 (−25.5) | −9.8 (−23.2) | 2.8 (−16.2) | 12.9 (−10.6) | 20.7 (−6.3) | 28.6 (−1.9) | 36.1 (2.3) | 34.3 (1.3) | 24.6 (−4.1) | 12.1 (−11.1) | −2.6 (−19.2) | −11.6 (−24.2) | −17.8 (−27.7) |
| Record low °F (°C) | −42 (−41) | −36 (−38) | −34 (−37) | −6 (−21) | 8 (−13) | 20 (−7) | 25 (−4) | 22 (−6) | 11 (−12) | −10 (−23) | −21 (−29) | −37 (−38) | −42 (−41) |
| Average precipitation inches (mm) | 0.28 (7.1) | 0.23 (5.8) | 0.46 (12) | 0.74 (19) | 1.20 (30) | 1.48 (38) | 0.58 (15) | 0.66 (17) | 0.65 (17) | 0.80 (20) | 0.44 (11) | 0.44 (11) | 7.96 (202.9) |
| Average snowfall inches (cm) | 4.6 (12) | 2.7 (6.9) | 1.9 (4.8) | 1.3 (3.3) | 0.4 (1.0) | 0.2 (0.51) | 0.0 (0.0) | 0.0 (0.0) | 0.2 (0.51) | 0.9 (2.3) | 1.6 (4.1) | 4.5 (11) | 18.3 (46.42) |
| Average precipitation days (≥ 0.01 in) | 4.4 | 3.5 | 4.2 | 7.3 | 8.7 | 7.8 | 5.2 | 5.7 | 4.5 | 5.2 | 5.0 | 5.4 | 66.9 |
| Average snowy days (≥ 0.1 in) | 3.8 | 2.6 | 1.5 | 0.9 | 0.2 | 0.1 | 0.0 | 0.0 | 0.1 | 0.8 | 2.3 | 3.8 | 16.1 |
Source 1: NOAA
Source 2: National Weather Service

== Demographics ==
Historical population
| Census | Pop. | Note | %± |
|---|---|---|---|
| 1910 | 638 | | — |
| 1920 | 869 | | 36.2% |
| 1930 | 777 | | −10.6% |
| 1940 | 776 | | −0.1% |
| 1950 | 760 | | −2.1% |
| 1960 | 652 | | −14.2% |
| 1970 | 539 | | −17.3% |
| 1980 | 541 | | 0.4% |
| 1990 | 574 | | 6.1% |
| 2000 | 566 | | −1.4% |
| 2010 | 517 | | −8.7% |
| 2020 | 439 | | −15.1% |
U.S. Decennial Census

=== 2010 census ===
As of the census of 2010, there were 517 people, 247 households, and 137 families residing in the city. The population density was 601.2 inhabitants per square mile (232.1/km^{2}). There were 352 housing units at an average density of 409.3 units per square mile (158.0 units/km^{2}). The racial makeup of the city was 98.8% White, 0.2% African American, 0.6% Native American, and 0.4% from two or more races. Hispanic or Latino of any race were 1.0% of the population.

There were 247 households, of which 21.9% had children under the age of 18 living with them, 43.3% were married couples living together, 7.3% had a female householder with no husband present, 4.9% had a male householder with no wife present, and 44.5% were non-families. 39.7% of all households were made up of individuals, and 23.9% had someone living alone who was 65 years of age or older. The average household size was 2.09 and the average family size was 2.72.

The median age in the city was 47.5 years. 21.5% of residents were under the age of 18; 5.1% were between the ages of 18 and 24; 19.3% were from 25 to 44; 31.4% were from 45 to 64; and 22.6% were 65 years of age or older. The gender makeup of the city was 51.6% male and 48.4% female.

=== 2000 census ===
As of the census of 2000, there were 566 people, 261 households, and 149 families residing in the city. The population density was 651.8 inhabitants per square mile (251.7/km^{2}). There were 353 housing units at an average density of 406.5 units per square mile (157.0 units/km^{2}). The racial makeup of the city was 98.59% White, 0.35% Native American, 0.71% from other races, and 0.35% from two or more races. Hispanic or Latino of any race were 2.30% of the population.

There were 261 households, out of which 23.4% had children under the age of 18 living with them, 48.7% were married couples living together, 5.7% had a female householder with no husband present, and 42.9% were non-families. 39.5% of all households were made up of individuals, and 21.1% had someone living alone who was 65 years of age or older. The average household size was 2.13 and the average family size was 2.86.

In the city, the population was spread out, with 22.4% under the age of 18, 4.6% from 18 to 24, 23.9% from 25 to 44, 27.7% from 45 to 64, and 21.4% who were 65 years of age or older. The median age was 44 years. For every 100 females, there were 95.8 males. For every 100 females age 18 and over, there were 96.9 males.

The median income for a household in the city was $23,807, and the median income for a family was $31,667. Males had a median income of $38,750 versus $20,357 for females. The per capita income for the city was $14,237. About 13.0% of families and 18.4% of the population were below the poverty line, including 19.5% of those under age 18 and 19.8% of those age 65 or over.

== 1983 earthquake ==
On Friday, October 28, 1983, the Borah Peak earthquake occurred at 8:06 am MDT, measured at 6.9 on the moment magnitude scale. The Challis-Mackay region experienced rather thorough damage, with 11 commercial buildings and 39 homes with major damage; while another 200 houses were damaged, minor to moderately. Chickens were running all through the streets. Mackay experienced the most severe damage. Most of the city's large buildings on its Main Street were damaged, to some extent; eight of these buildings were deemed condemned and closed down. Most of these buildings were built from materials such as brick, concrete block, and stone, each varying.

== Notable residents ==
- Chase A. Clark, 18th governor of Idaho (1941–43) and federal judge
- Marilyn Howard, politician and educator

== See also ==
- List of cities in Idaho
