= Lost River Peak =

Mountain in Idaho, United States

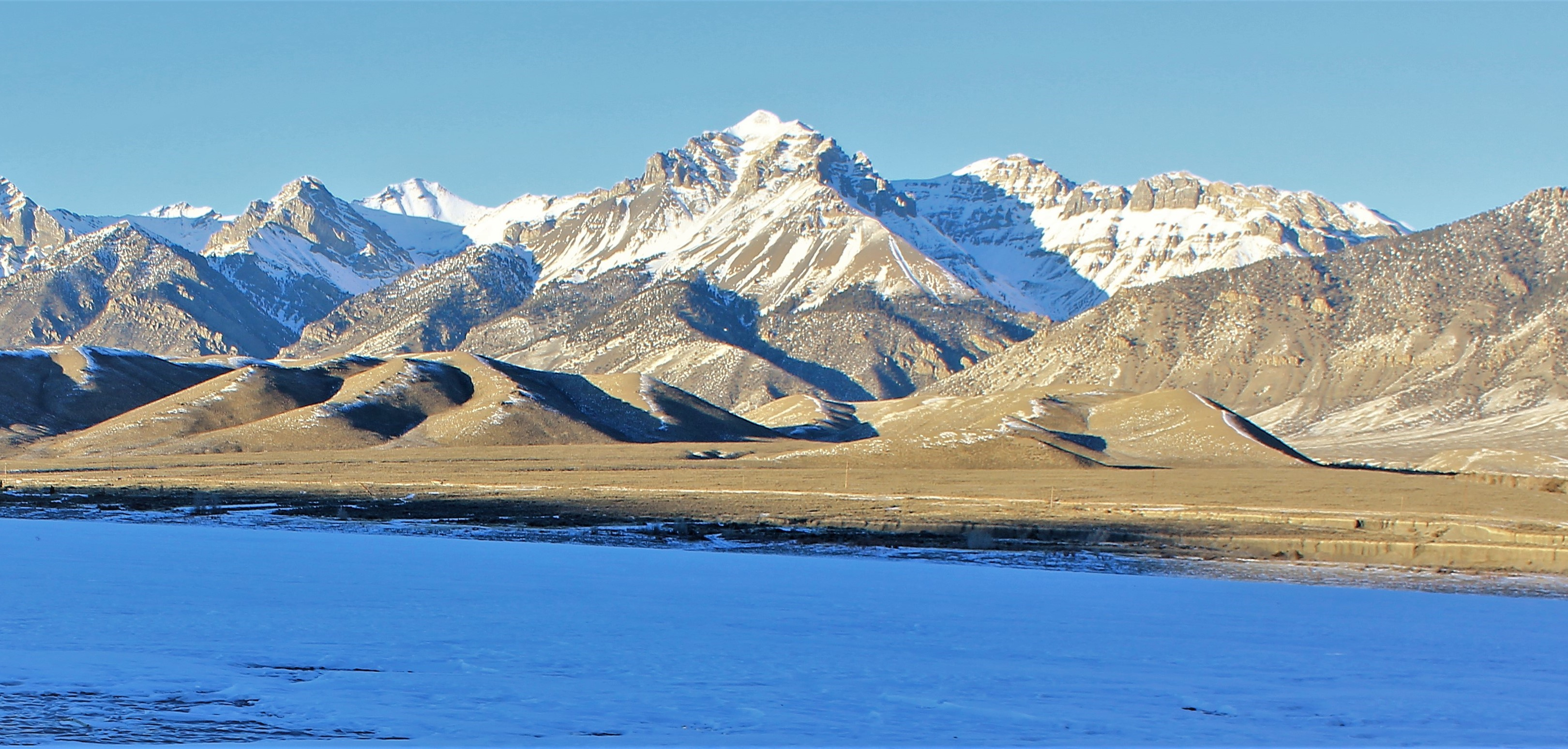
- South aspect

Highest point
- Elevation: 12,078 ft (3,681 m)
- Prominence: 678 ft (207 m)
- Parent peak: Mount Breitenbach
- Coordinates: 44°02′32″N 113°39′17″W

Geography
- Location within Idaho
- Location: Custer County, Idaho, U.S.
- Parent range: Lost River Range
- Topo map: USGS Leatherman Peak

Climbing
- Easiest route: Scrambling, class 3

Lost River Peak, also known as Lost River Mountain, at 12,078 feet (3,681 m) above sea level is the sixth-highest peak in the U.S. state of Idaho and the fifth-highest in the Lost River Range. The peak is located in Salmon-Challis National Forest in Custer County. It is 1.8 mi (2.9 km) southeast of Mount Breitenbach, its line parent.
