= Merriam Lake =

Alpine lake in Idaho, US

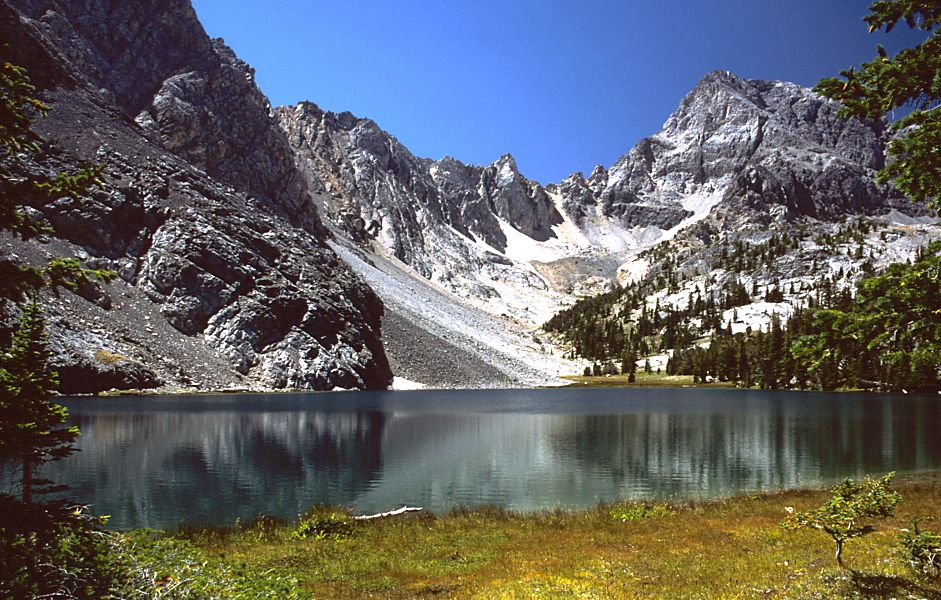

- Location within Idaho Location within the United States
- Location: Challis National Forest, Custer County, Idaho, US
- Coordinates: 44°06′55″N 113°45′18″W
- Basin countries: United States

Merriam Lake is a lake situated in the Lost River Range in Idaho, surrounded by mountains over 12,000 ft (3,700 m) high. In 2007 the state authorities planted tiger muskies in the lake to better manage the fisheries. Bighorn sheep and Mountain goat are the few mammals disposed to this terrain of central Idaho which Dr. C. Hart Merriam identified as Arctic–alpine when he made a biological survey of the region in 1890.
