= Dickey Peak (Idaho) =

Mountain in Idaho, United States

- Location within Idaho

Highest point
- Elevation: 3,397.3 m (11,146 ft)
- Prominence: 860 m (2,820 ft)
- Parent peak: Doublespring Peak
- Isolation: 7.22 km (4.49 mi)
- Coordinates: 44.2293°N 113.8833°W

Geography
- Location: Custer County, Idaho
- Parent range: Lost River Range

Dickey Peak is a mountain in Custer County, Idaho. At 3397m, it's the 14th highest peak in Idaho that has at least 500m of topographic prominence.
