= Donaldson Peak =

Mountain in the state of Idaho

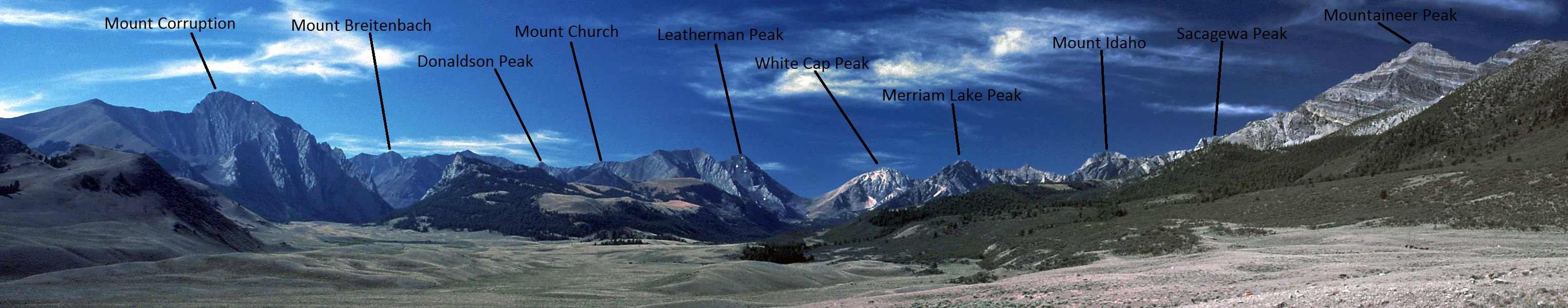
- Mount Breitenbach and surrounding peaks

Highest point
- Elevation: 12,023 ft (3,665 m)
- Prominence: 303 ft (92 m)
- Parent peak: Mount Church
- Coordinates: 44°03′53″N 113°41′53″W

Geography
- Location within Idaho
- Location: Custer County, Idaho, U.S.
- Parent range: Lost River Range
- Topo map: USGS Leatherman Peak

Climbing
- Easiest route: Scrambling, class 3

Donaldson Peak, at 12,023 feet (3,665 m) above sea level, is the eighth-highest peak in the U.S. state of Idaho, and the seventh-highest in the Lost River Range. The peak is located in Salmon-Challis National Forest in Custer County. It is 0.65 miles (1.05 km) east of Mount Church, its line parent and 1.4 miles (2.3 km) west of Mount Breitenbach.

It is named for Charles R. Donaldson (1919-1987), former Chief Justice of the Idaho Supreme Court.
