= Mount Breitenbach =

Mountain in the state of Idaho

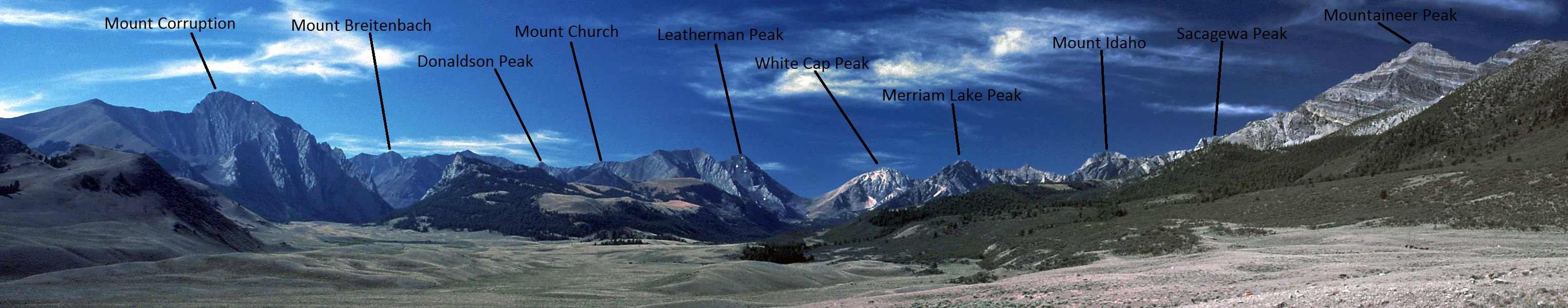
- Mount Breitenbach and surrounding peaks

Highest point
- Elevation: 12,140 ft (3,700 m)
- Prominence: 620 ft (190 m)
- Parent peak: Mount Church
- Coordinates: 44°04′00″N 113°40′23″W

Geography
- Location within Idaho
- Location: Custer County, Idaho, U.S.
- Parent range: Lost River Range
- Topo map: USGS Leatherman Peak

Climbing
- Easiest route: Scramble, class 3

Mount Breitenbach, at 12,140 feet (3,700 m) above sea level, is the fifth-highest peak in the U.S. state of Idaho and the fourth-highest in the Lost River Range. The peak is located in Salmon-Challis National Forest in Custer County. It is 2.0 miles (3.2 km) east of Mount Church, its line parent, 1.4 miles (2.3 km) east of Donaldson Peak, 0.85 miles (1.37 km) southeast of No Regret Peak, and 1.8 miles (2.9 km) north of Lost River Peak.

== Climate ==
Climate data for Mount Breitenbach 44.0605 N, 113.6751 W, Elevation: 11,453 ft (3,491 m) (1991–2020 normals)
Month	Jan	Feb	Mar	Apr	May	Jun	Jul	Aug	Sep	Oct	Nov	Dec	Year
Mean daily maximum °F (°C)	19.6 (−6.9)	19.0 (−7.2)	23.0 (−5.0)	27.9 (−2.3)	37.5 (3.1)	47.3 (8.5)	59.1 (15.1)	58.7 (14.8)	49.8 (9.9)	36.7 (2.6)	24.4 (−4.2)	18.7 (−7.4)	35.1 (1.8)
Daily mean °F (°C)	11.8 (−11.2)	10.1 (−12.2)	13.2 (−10.4)	17.3 (−8.2)	26.1 (−3.3)	34.9 (1.6)	45.2 (7.3)	44.8 (7.1)	36.5 (2.5)	25.8 (−3.4)	16.4 (−8.7)	11.1 (−11.6)	24.4 (−4.2)
Mean daily minimum °F (°C)	4.0 (−15.6)	1.1 (−17.2)	3.5 (−15.8)	6.7 (−14.1)	14.6 (−9.7)	22.5 (−5.3)	31.3 (−0.4)	30.8 (−0.7)	23.3 (−4.8)	14.8 (−9.6)	8.4 (−13.1)	3.5 (−15.8)	13.7 (−10.2)
Average precipitation inches (mm)	3.81 (97)	3.66 (93)	4.40 (112)	3.15 (80)	3.37 (86)	2.68 (68)	1.57 (40)	1.63 (41)	2.15 (55)	3.14 (80)	3.11 (79)	4.32 (110)	36.99 (941)
Source: PRISM Climate Group
