= Mount Church (Idaho) =

Mountain in Idaho, United States

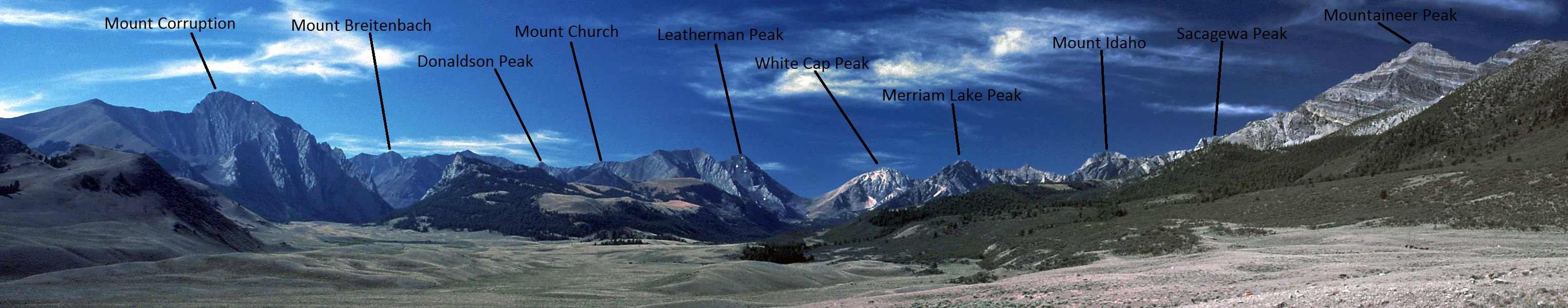
- Mount Church and surrounding peaks

Highest point
- Elevation: 12,200 ft (3,700 m)
- Prominence: 920 ft (280 m)
- Parent peak: Leatherman Peak
- Coordinates: 44°03′58″N 113°42′48″W

Geography
- Location within Idaho
- Location: Custer County, Idaho, U.S.
- Parent range: Lost River Range
- Topo map: USGS Leatherman Peak

Climbing
- Easiest route: Scramble, class 3

Mount Church, at 12,200 feet (3,700 m) above sea level is the third highest peak in Idaho and the Lost River Range. The peak is located in Salmon-Challis National Forest in Custer County. It is 1.45 mi (2.33 km) southeast of Leatherman Peak, its line parent, and 0.65 mi (1.05 km) northwest of Donaldson Peak. The peak has not been officially named or measured, but it has been unofficially named after Frank Church, a former Senator from Idaho.
