= Leatherman Peak =

Mountain in Idaho, United States

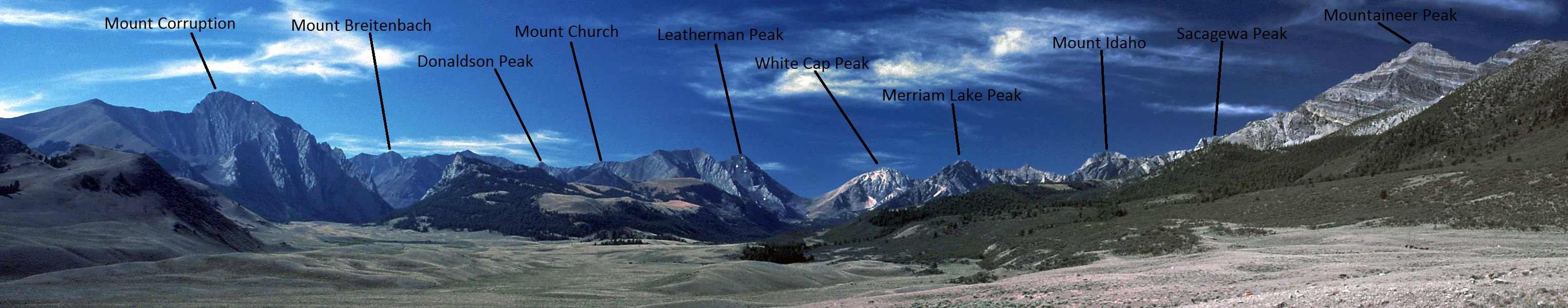
- Leatherman Peak at center

Highest point
- Elevation: 12,228 ft (3,727 m)
- Prominence: 1,668 ft (508 m)
- Parent peak: Borah Peak
- Coordinates: 44°04′56″N 113°43′58″W

Geography
- Location within Idaho
- Location: Custer County, Idaho, U.S.
- Parent range: Lost River Range
- Topo map: USGS Leatherman Peak

Climbing
- First ascent: 1912 by T.M Bannon
- Easiest route: Scrambling, class 3

Leatherman Peak, at 12,228 feet (3,727 m) above sea level is the second highest peak in Idaho and the Lost River Range. The peak is located in Salmon-Challis National Forest in Custer County. It is 4.5 mi (7.2 km) southeast of Borah Peak, its line parent. It is also about 4.5 mi (7.2 km) northeast from U.S. Route 92.

The peak was named after Henry Leatherman.
