= Lost River Range =

Mountain range in the US state of Idaho

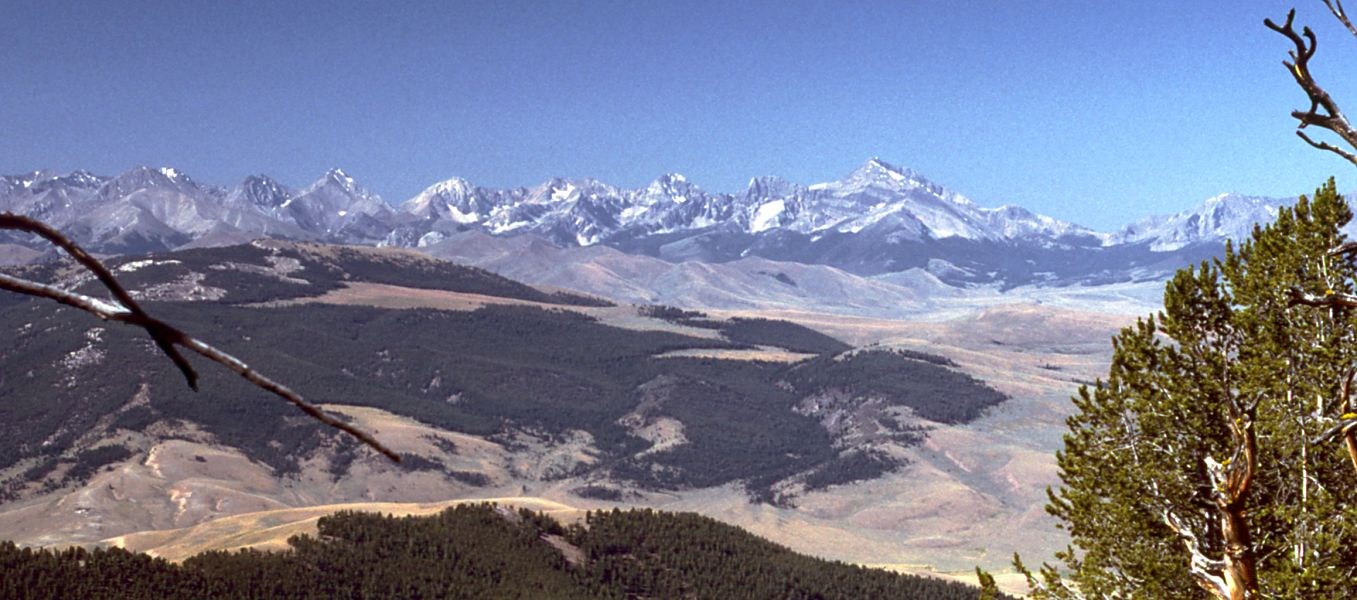
- Lost River Range, looking southwest from the Lemhi Range

Highest point
- Peak: Borah Peak
- Elevation: 12,662 ft (3,859 m)
- Coordinates: 44°08′15″N 113°46′52″W

Dimensions
- Length: 79 mi (127 km) N/S
- Width: 67 mi (108 km) E/W
- Area: 1,799 mi^{2} (4,660 km^{2})

Geography
- Country: United States
- State: Idaho
- Parent range: Rocky Mountains

The Lost River Range is a high mountain range of the Rocky Mountains, located in Central Idaho, in the Northwestern United States.

It runs southeast for approximately 75 miles (121 km) from the Salmon River near the community of Challis to the Snake River Valley near Arco. To the west are the valleys of the Salmon and the Big Lost Rivers, while to the east are the Little Lost River and Pashimeroi Valleys.

The range starts at the east bank of the Salmon River, at an elevation of about 5,000 feet (1,500 m). It quickly rises to Grouse Creek Mountain (11,085 ft; 3,379 m) and Dickey Peak (11,141 ft; 3,396 m), and then descends to Double Springs Pass, location of one of just two roads to cross the range. Nearby is an interpretive site explaining the effects of the magnitude 6.9 Borah Peak earthquake that hit the range on October 28, 1983. The Big Lost River Valley fell and the Lost River Range rose, leaving a fault scarp of up to 14 ft (4.3 m) along the base of the mountains.

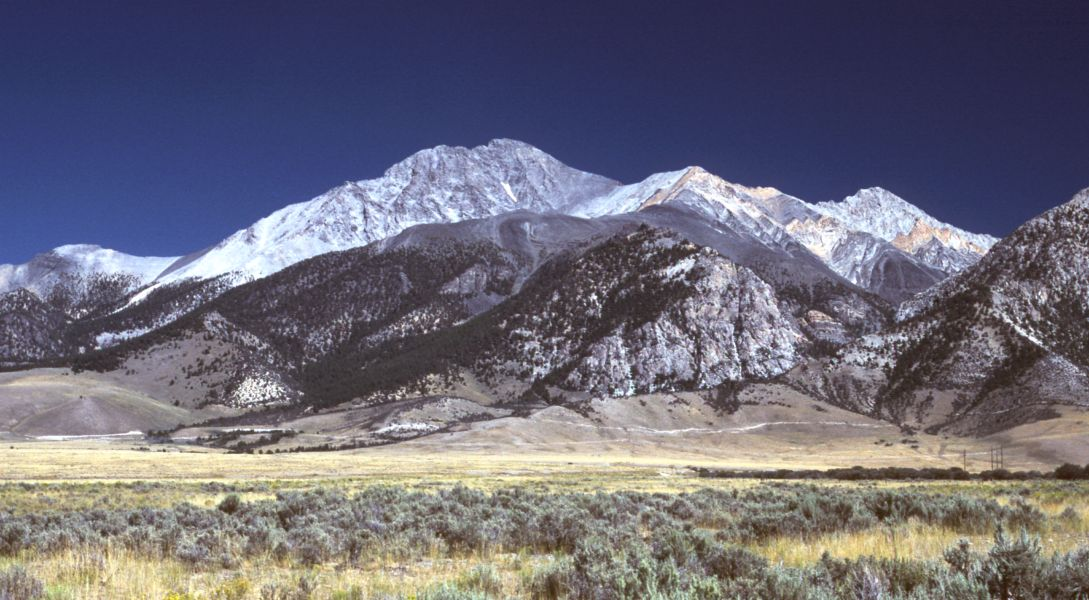
Borah Peak, Idaho, looking east (note the 1983 earthquake fault scarp running across the bottom of the range).

The range then rises into its high central section, which includes many of the state's highest peaks. Borah Peak, the highest, climbs to 12,662 ft (3,859 m). Further south are Mount Idaho (12,065 ft; 3,677 m), Leatherman Peak (12,228 ft; 3,727 m), Mount Church (over 12,200 ft; 3,700 m), Mount Breitenbach (12,140 ft; 3,700 m), and Lost River Mountain (12,078 ft; 3,681 m). To the east of this section of the range lie the remote canyons of the Upper Pashimeroi Valley, including scenic Merriam Lake.

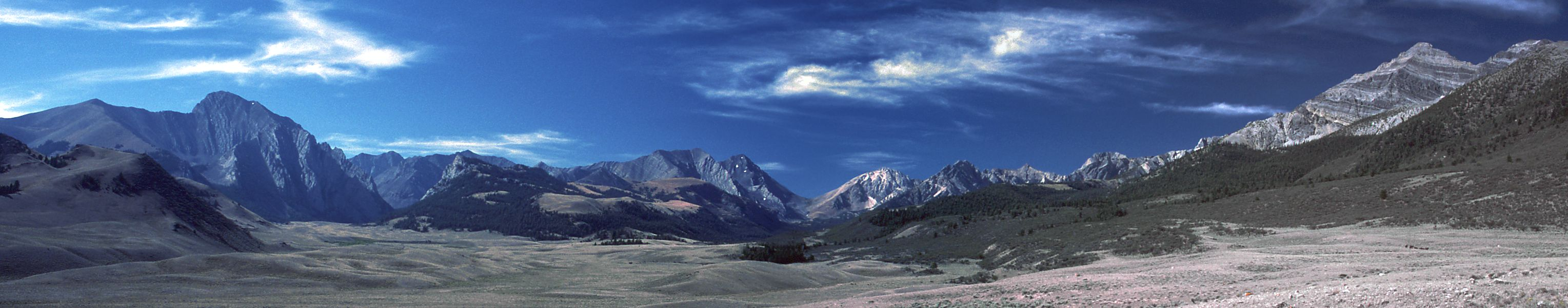
Panorama of the Upper Pashimeroi Valley, including Leatherman Peak (center)

The range then descends to Pass Creek Summit, the second road to cross its crest. It continues to King Mountain (10,612 ft; 3,235 m), a favorite site for hang gliders. Finally it descends sharply to the Snake River Valley near the community of Arco, at an elevation of 5,300 ft (1,600 m).

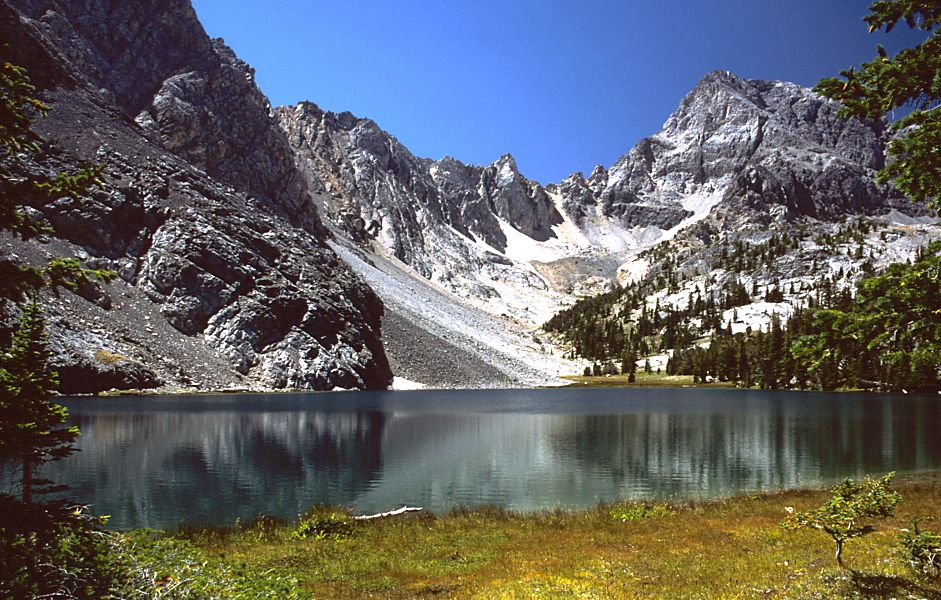
Merriam Lake, Idaho, in the Lost River Range.

== Peaks ==
The ten highest peaks of the Lost River Range
| Mountain Peak | Elevation | Prominence | Isolation | Location |
|---|---|---|---|---|
| Borah Peak | 12,661 ft 3859 m | 5,981 ft 1823 m | 150.8 mi 243 km | 44.137376°N 113.781122°W |
| Leatherman Peak | 12,228 ft 3727 m | 1,667 ft 508 m | 4.51 mi 7.26 km | 44.082038°N 113.733004°W |
| Mount Church | 12,201 ft 3719 m | 922 ft 281 m | 1.47 mi 2.37 km | 44.066058°N 113.713397°W |
| Mount Breitenbach | 12,139 ft 3700 m | 620 ft 189 m | 2.01 mi 3.24 km | 44.065166°N 113.672913°W |
| Lost River Peak | 12,077 ft 3681 m | 676 ft 206 m | 1.83 mi 2.95 km | 44.042135°N 113.654658°W |
| Mount Idaho | 12,064 ft 3677 m | 1,063 ft 324 m | 2.17 mi 3.49 km | 44.106047°N 113.777803°W |
| Donaldson Peak | 12,024 ft 3665 m | 305 ft 93 m | 0.66 mi 1.06 km | 44.064177°N 113.700468°W |
| USGS Peak | 11,982 ft 3652 m | 1,781 ft 543 m | 4.14 mi 6.66 km | 44.013325°N 113.581851°W |
| No Regret Peak | 11,972 ft 3649 m | 253 ft 77 m | 0.76 mi 1.22 km | 44.070711°N 113.688291°W |
| Peak 11,967 | 11,969 ft 3648 m | 607 ft 185 m | 0.89 mi 1.43 km | 44.093748°N 113.772629°W |
