= Borah Peak =

Highest mountain in Idaho, United States

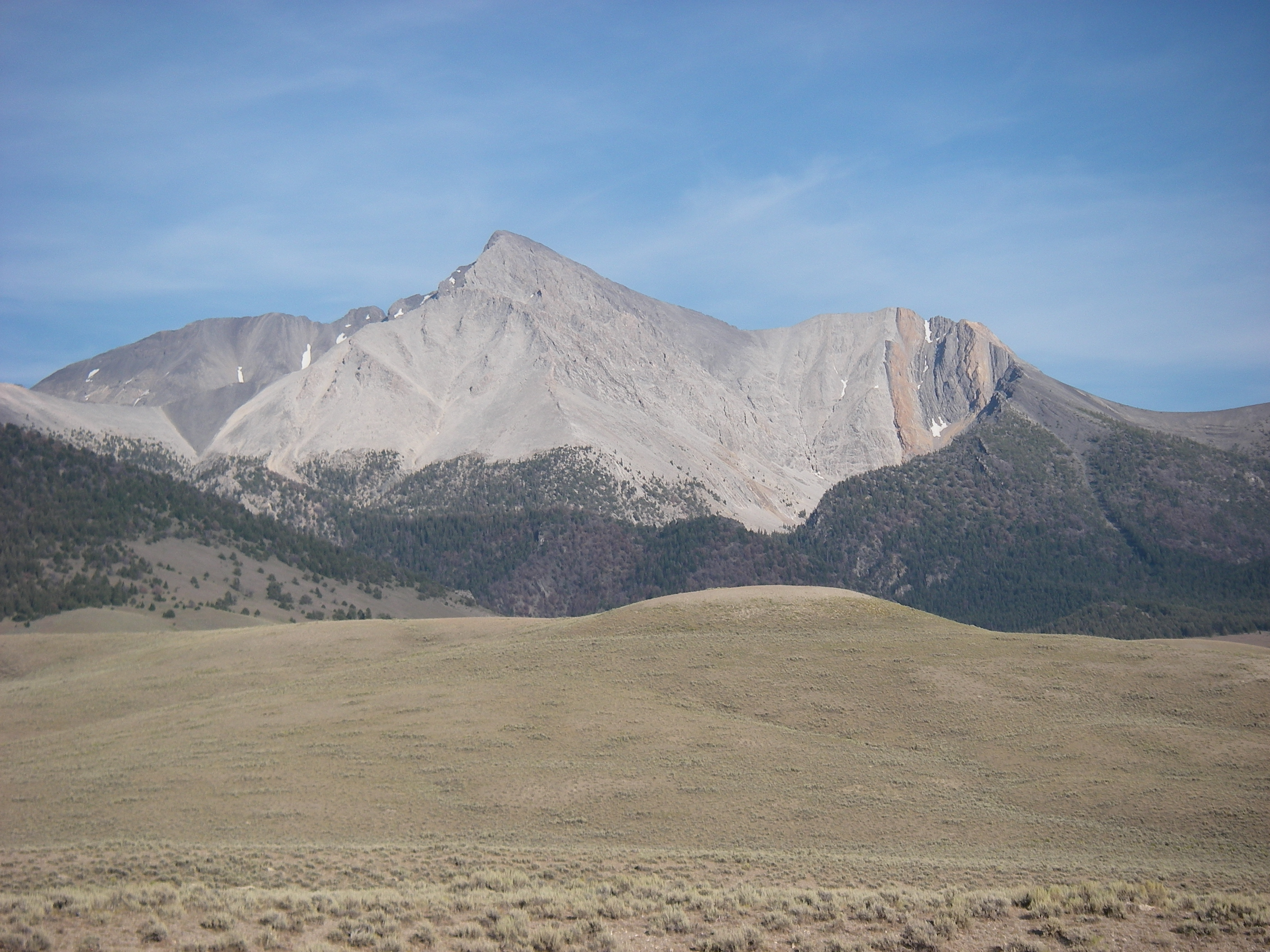
- View from west in August 2009

Highest point
- Elevation: 12,666 ft (3,861 m)
- Prominence: 5,982 ft (1,823 m)
- Listing: North America isolated peaks 82nd; US most prominent peaks 65th; U.S. state high point 11th
- Coordinates: 44°08′15″N 113°46′52″W

Geography
- Location within the United States Location within Idaho
- Location: Custer County, Idaho, U.S.
- Parent range: Lost River Range
- Topo map: USGS Borah Peak

Climbing
- First ascent: 1912; 114 years ago by T.M. Bannon
- Easiest route: Class 3 Scramble

Borah Peak, also known as Mount Borah or Beauty Peak, is a mountain in the western United States and the highest summit in Idaho. One of the most prominent peaks in the contiguous United States, it is located in central Idaho in the central section of the Lost River Range, within the Challis National Forest in eastern Custer County. On February 11, 2021, the USGS officially recognized Mt. Borah as Idaho's only active glacier.

== Description ==
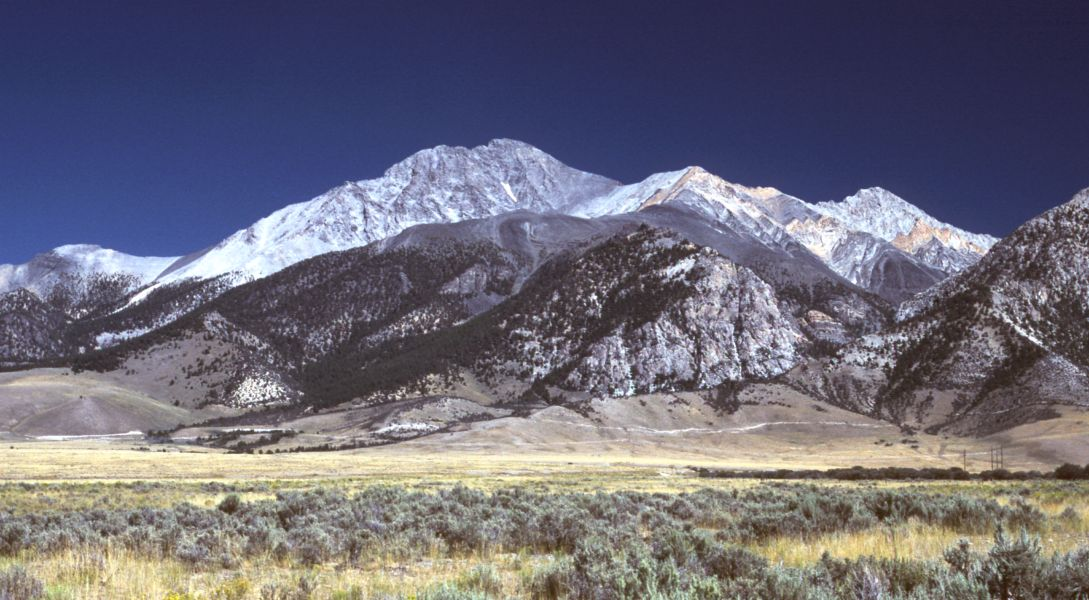
View of Borah from the west

The mountain was nameless until it was discovered to be higher than Hyndman Peak, previously regarded as the state's highest point. In February 1934, the U.S. Geological Survey named it for William Borah, the prominent senior U.S. Senator from Idaho, who had served for nearly 27 years at the time and was dean of the Senate. An outspoken isolationist, the "Lion of Idaho" ran for president two years later in 1936, but did not win the Republican nomination, and died in office in 1940.

== Climate ==
Climate data for Borah Peak 44.1341 N, 113.7832 W, Elevation: 11,745 ft (3,580 m) (1991–2020 normals)
Month	Jan	Feb	Mar	Apr	May	Jun	Jul	Aug	Sep	Oct	Nov	Dec	Year
Mean daily maximum °F (°C)	18.8 (−7.3)	18.1 (−7.7)	22.1 (−5.5)	26.9 (−2.8)	36.5 (2.5)	46.3 (7.9)	58.0 (14.4)	57.6 (14.2)	48.8 (9.3)	35.8 (2.1)	23.6 (−4.7)	17.9 (−7.8)	34.2 (1.2)
Daily mean °F (°C)	10.9 (−11.7)	9.1 (−12.7)	12.3 (−10.9)	16.3 (−8.7)	25.0 (−3.9)	33.8 (1.0)	44.3 (6.8)	43.8 (6.6)	35.5 (1.9)	24.8 (−4.0)	15.5 (−9.2)	10.2 (−12.1)	23.5 (−4.7)
Mean daily minimum °F (°C)	3.0 (−16.1)	0.1 (−17.7)	2.4 (−16.4)	5.6 (−14.7)	13.5 (−10.3)	21.3 (−5.9)	30.6 (−0.8)	29.9 (−1.2)	22.1 (−5.5)	13.8 (−10.1)	7.5 (−13.6)	2.5 (−16.4)	12.7 (−10.7)
Average precipitation inches (mm)	4.37 (111)	4.13 (105)	5.03 (128)	5.11 (130)	5.20 (132)	3.92 (100)	1.67 (42)	1.60 (41)	2.44 (62)	3.64 (92)	4.12 (105)	4.99 (127)	46.22 (1,175)
Source: PRISM Climate Group

== 1983 earthquake ==
The 1983 Borah Peak earthquake occurred on Friday, October 28, at 8:06:09 MDT in the Lost River Range at Borah Peak, measuring 6.9 on the moment magnitude scale. Borah Peak rose about one foot (30 cm) and the Lost River Valley in that vicinity dropped about eight feet (2.4 m). The peak was scarred on the western side, and the mark is still visible. Two children in Challis were the only fatalities of the quake, struck by falling masonry while walking to school.

== Climbing ==
View from the summit of Borah Peak, August 2011

Drone video of 3 hikers climbing Chicken-out Ridge towards Borah Peak (left of the hikers) after fresh snowfall in September 2024

The normal route involves ascending 5,262 vertical feet (1,604 m) from the trailhead to the summit in just over 3.5 miles (5.6 km). This route on the southwest ridge, the most popular route, is a strenuous hike for the most part until one reaches a Class 4 arête just before the main summit crest. This point is known as Chicken-out Ridge as many people will abort the attempt once they see the hazards up close. In the cooler seasons, this crossing usually involves a traverse over snow, with steeply slanting slopes on either side. An ice axe, and the ability to use it, is recommended for this section when icy.

Borah Peak's north face is one of Idaho's only year-round snow climbs and provides a much greater challenge than the normal route. The face features a number of Grade II class 5 routes on mixed terrain.

Three climbers are known to have died on Borah Peak: two climbers, Vaughn Howard and Guy Campbell, ascended the northwest ridge on November 24, 1977, and were killed in an avalanche. The bodies were not recovered for nine months, until August 26, 1978. On June 13, 1987, another climber, Dave Probst, died on a glissade.

== See also ==
- List of mountains of Idaho
- List of mountain peaks of Idaho
- List of mountain ranges in Idaho
- List of U.S. states by elevation
