= Salmon–Challis National Forest =

National forest in Idaho, United States

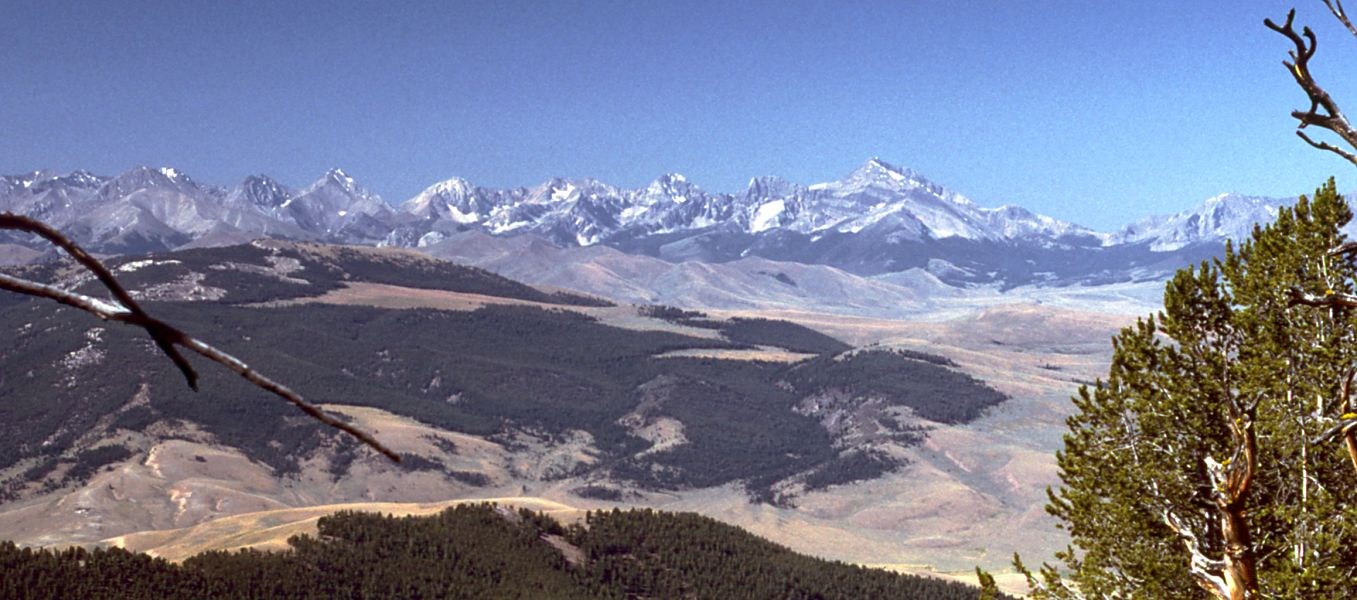
- Lost River Range in Salmon–Challis National Forest

- Location within the United States
- Location: Idaho, United States
- Nearest city: Salmon, Idaho
- Coordinates: 45°16′54″N 114°11′45″W
- Area: 4,235,940 acres (17,142.2 km^{2})
- Established: July 1, 1908
- Governing body: U.S. Forest Service
- Website: Salmon-Challis National Forest

Interactive map of Salmon–Challis National Forest

Salmon–Challis National Forest is located in east central sections of the U.S. state of Idaho. At 4,235,940 acres (6,618.66 sq mi, or 17,142.24 km^{2}) it is one of the largest national forests in the lower 48 states and also has most of the land area of the Frank Church–River of No Return Wilderness, which is the largest wilderness area south of Alaska.

Borah Peak, the tallest mountain in Idaho, is also found here. The Wild and Scenic designated Salmon River weaves through the rugged terrain of the Sawtooth Mountains and Sawtooth National Recreation Area, while it flows for over 75 miles (121 km) through the forest. The Big Lost River has its headwaters within the national forest.

Challis National Forest, the more southerly of its two parts, lies primarily in Custer County, but also has major areas in Lemhi and Butte counties, as well as smaller areas in Clark and Blaine counties. It has a total area of 2,463,471 acres (3,849.17 sq mi, or 9,969.31 km^{2}). There are local ranger district offices located in Challis, Clayton, and Mackay.

Salmon National Forest, which lies to the north, is primarily located in Lemhi County, with spillover into Valley and Idaho counties. It has a total area of 1,772,469 acres (2,769.48 sq mi, or 7,172.93 km^{2}). There are local ranger district offices located in Leadore, North Fork, and Salmon.

The combined forest headquarters are located in Salmon, Idaho.

== Climate ==
There is a weather station at Middle Fork Lodge, which is on the western edge of Salmon–Challis National Forest.

Climate data for Middle Fork Lodge, Idaho 1991–2020 normals: 4480ft (1366m)
Month	Jan	Feb	Mar	Apr	May	Jun	Jul	Aug	Sep	Oct	Nov	Dec	Year
Mean daily maximum °F (°C)	34.1 (1.2)	40.4 (4.7)	49.8 (9.9)	57.3 (14.1)	66.6 (19.2)	75.0 (23.9)	85.7 (29.8)	85.0 (29.4)	75.9 (24.4)	60.7 (15.9)	43.0 (6.1)	33.3 (0.7)	58.9 (14.9)
Daily mean °F (°C)	25.0 (−3.9)	29.2 (−1.6)	37.4 (3.0)	44.0 (6.7)	52.4 (11.3)	59.5 (15.3)	67.1 (19.5)	65.6 (18.7)	57.5 (14.2)	45.8 (7.7)	33.1 (0.6)	24.2 (−4.3)	45.1 (7.3)
Mean daily minimum °F (°C)	15.9 (−8.9)	17.9 (−7.8)	25.0 (−3.9)	30.8 (−0.7)	38.1 (3.4)	43.9 (6.6)	48.4 (9.1)	46.3 (7.9)	39.1 (3.9)	30.8 (−0.7)	23.1 (−4.9)	15.2 (−9.3)	31.2 (−0.4)
Average precipitation inches (mm)	1.44 (37)	1.24 (31)	1.22 (31)	1.45 (37)	1.75 (44)	1.64 (42)	0.76 (19)	0.68 (17)	1.02 (26)	1.27 (32)	1.59 (40)	1.79 (45)	15.85 (401)
Average snowfall inches (cm)	11.90 (30.2)	6.40 (16.3)	3.30 (8.4)	1.10 (2.8)	0.20 (0.51)	0.00 (0.00)	0.00 (0.00)	0.00 (0.00)	0.00 (0.00)	1.00 (2.5)	4.30 (10.9)	12.50 (31.8)	40.7 (103.41)
Source: NOAA

== Wilderness areas ==
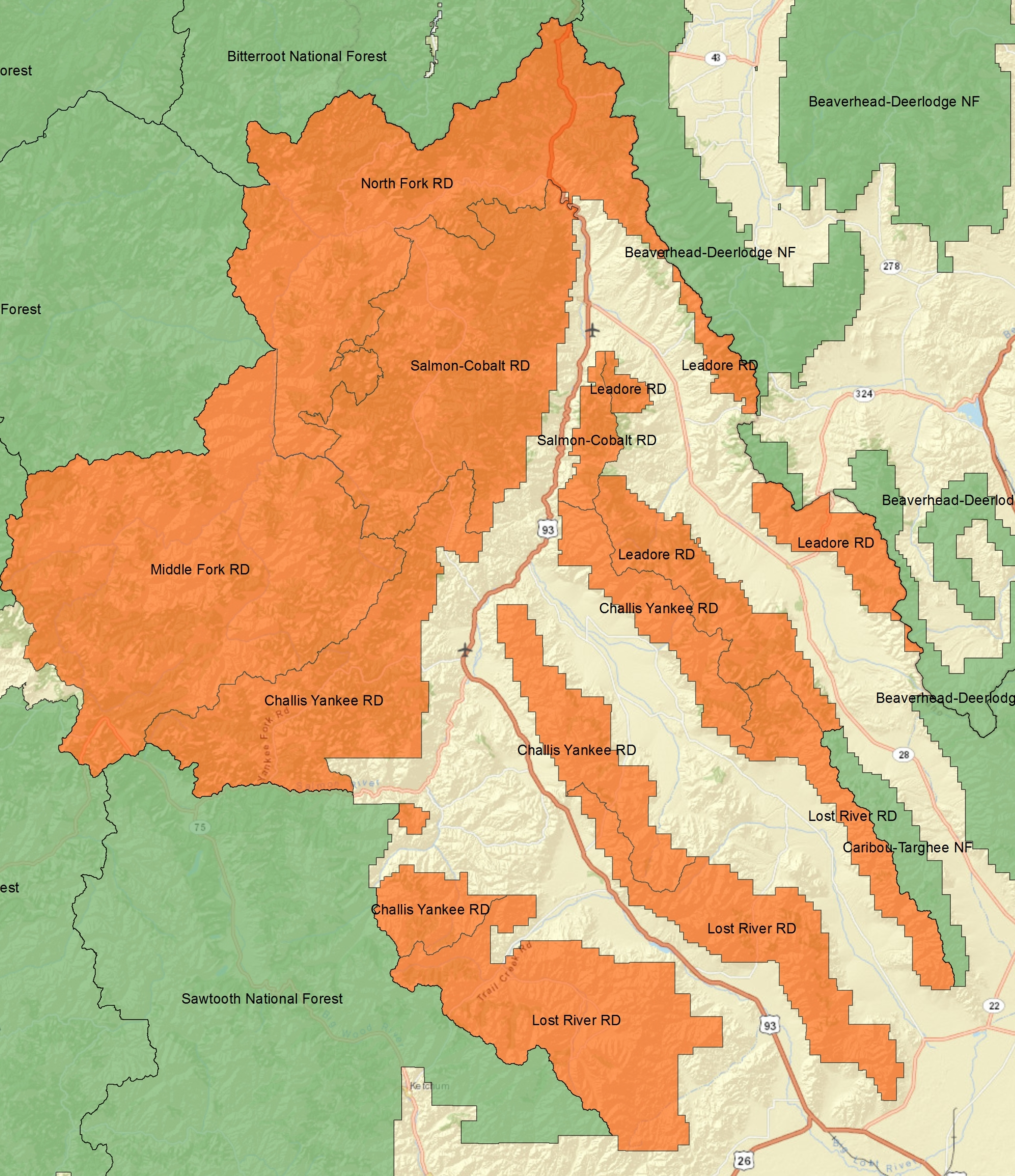
A map of Salmon–Challis National Forest

There are two officially designated wilderness areas within Salmon–Challis National Forest that are part of the National Wilderness Preservation System. Both extend into neighboring National Forests or onto lands of the Bureau of Land Management.

- Frank Church—River of No Return Wilderness (partly in Payette NF, Boise NF, Bitterroot NF, Nez Perce NF, or BLM land). The Salmon–Challis NF is the largest component (39.59%) of this wilderness if they are considered as one forest; otherwise, if the Challis NF and the Salmon NF are considered separately, the Payette NF (33.45%) becomes the largest component.
- Jim McClure–Jerry Peak Wilderness (most is managed by Salmon–Challis National Forest, while part is managed by the Bureau of Land Management)
- Sawtooth Wilderness (only about 5.5% of this wilderness lies with Salmon–Challis NF; most of it lies within Boise NF; part of it lies within Sawtooth NF; all of it is managed by Sawtooth National Forest)

== See also ==
- List of national forests of the United States
