= Secesh River =

Stream in the state of Idaho

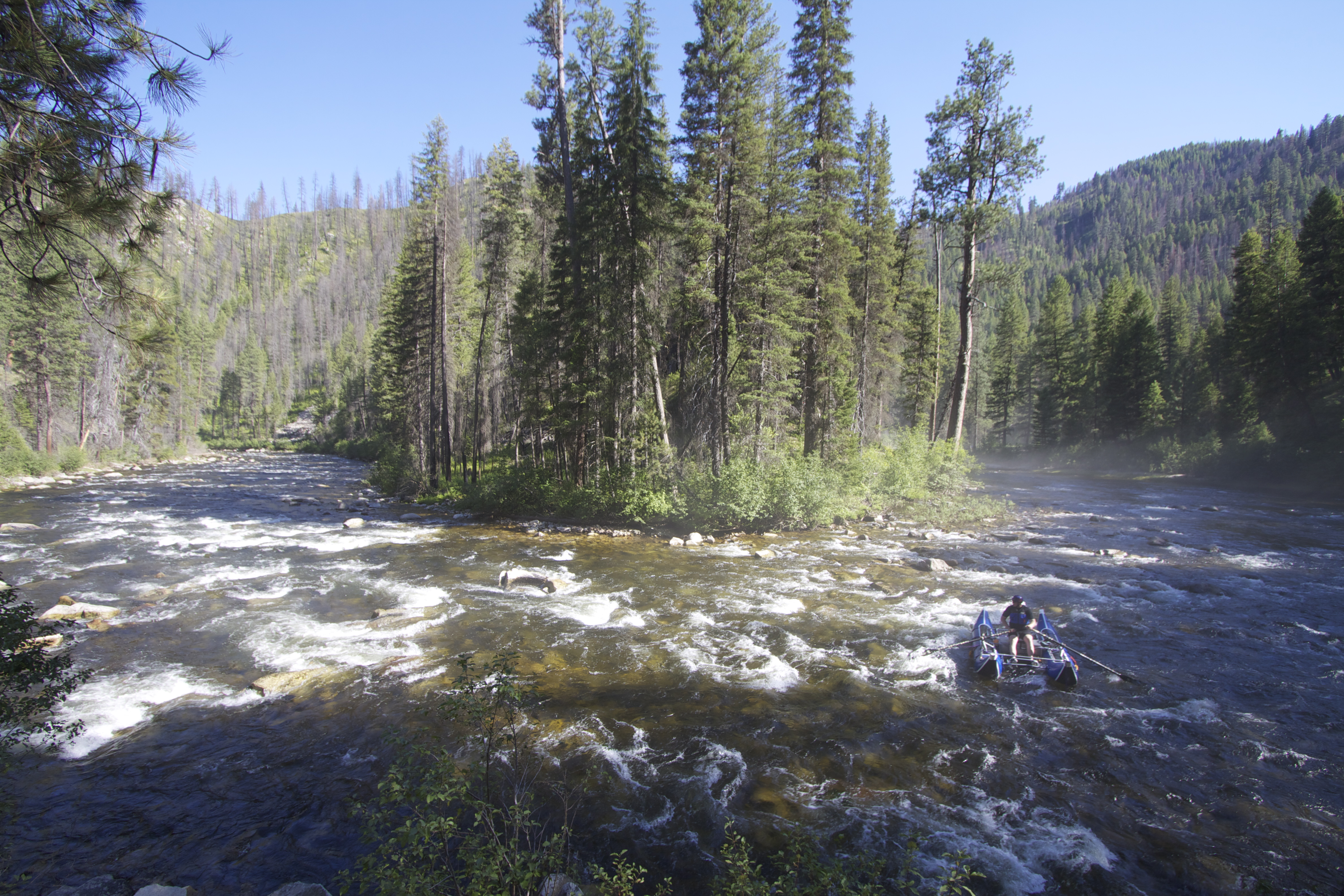
- Secesh River

- Location of the mouth of the Secesh River in Idaho Secesh River (the United States)

Location
- Country: United States
- State: Idaho

Physical characteristics
- Source: Confluence of Lake Creek and Summit Creek
  - location: Burgdorf, Idaho County
  - coordinates: 45°16′33″N 115°55′07″W
  - elevation: 6,099 ft (1,859 m)
- Mouth: South Fork Salmon River
  - location: Browns Camp, Valley County
  - coordinates: 45°01′30″N 115°42′27″W
  - elevation: 3,629 ft (1,106 m)
- Length: 27 mi (43 km)
- Discharge
  - location: Secesh Meadows
  - average: 194 cu ft/s (5.5 m^{3}/s)
  - minimum: 33 cu ft/s (0.93 m^{3}/s)
  - maximum: 2,500 cu ft/s (71 m^{3}/s)

Basin features
- Tributaries
  - left: Lake Creek (Idaho), Piah Creek, Warm Springs Creek (Idaho)
  - right: Summit Creek, Loon Creek, Lick Creek (Idaho)

The Secesh River is a 27-mile (43 km) tributary of the South Fork Salmon River in Idaho and Valley Counties, Idaho in the United States. The river begins at the confluence of Lake Creek and Summit Creek near the unincorporated community of Burgdorf and flows generally southeast, through Secesh Meadows and a series of canyons, emptying into the South Fork near Browns Camp.

The river drains a remote wilderness watershed in the Salmon River Mountains. Situated in the Payette National Forest, it is a popular destination for whitewater boating, and its confluence with the South Fork also marks the beginning of the South Fork's main whitewater run.

== See also ==
- List of rivers of Idaho
