= 2020 Central Idaho earthquake =

6.5 Mw earthquake in Idaho, United States

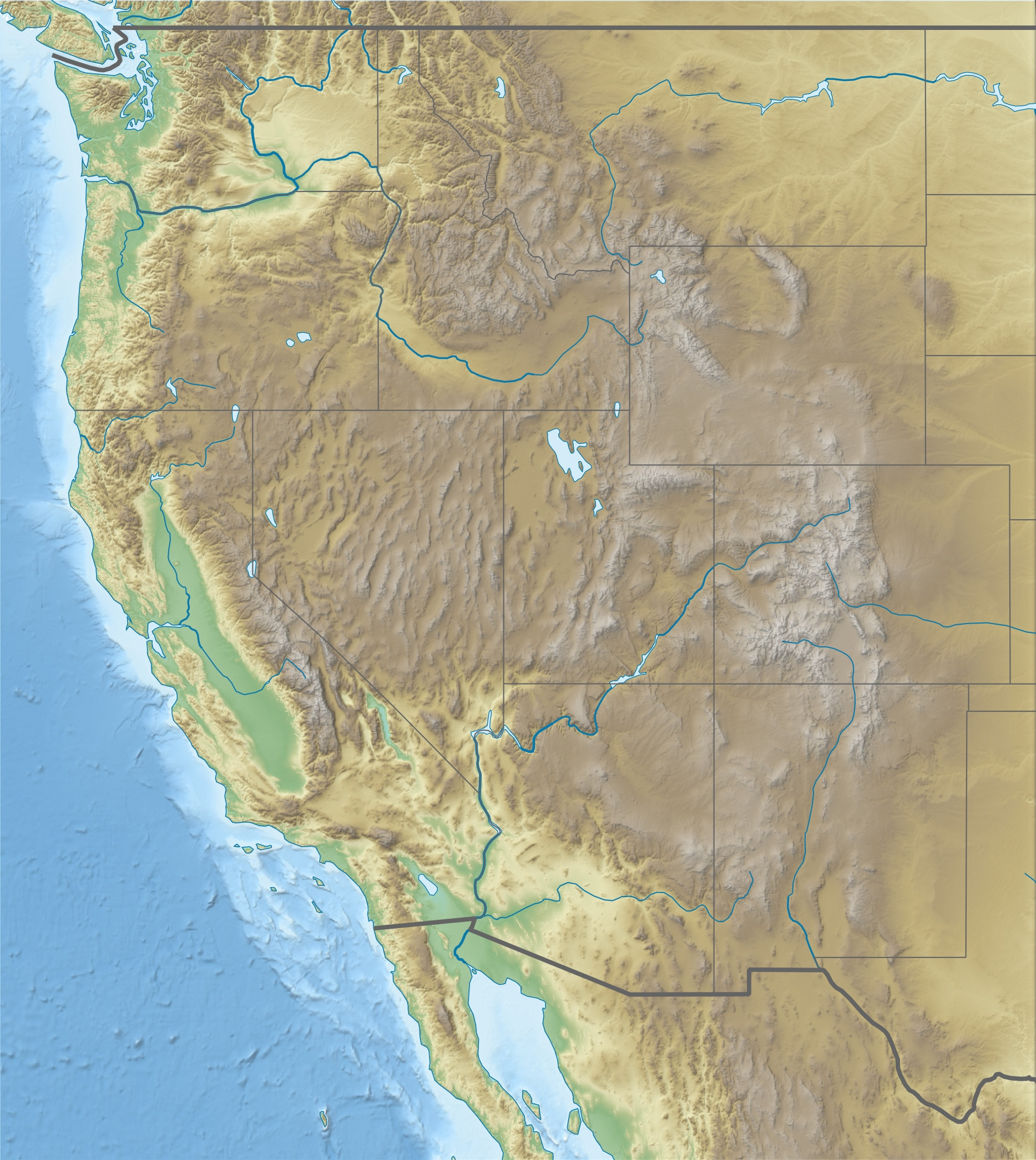
- Location within USA West Location within Idaho
- UTC time: 2020-03-31 23:52:31
- ISC event: 617825623
- USGS-ANSS: ComCat
- Local date: March 31, 2020
- Local time: 5:52:31 pm MDT
- Duration: 10 seconds
- Magnitude: 6.5 M_{w}
- Depth: 14.5 km (9.0 mi)
- Epicenter: 44.460°N 115.136°W
- Type: Strike-slip
- Areas affected: Idaho, United States
- Total damage: Little
- Max. intensity: MMI VIII (Severe)
- Landslides: Multiple
- Foreshocks: M_{w} 2.2
- Aftershocks: 2,500+
- Casualties: 0

The 2020 Central Idaho earthquake occurred in the western United States on March 31, 2020, at 5:52 PM MDT, near Ruffneck Peak in the Sawtooth Mountains of central Idaho, 72 miles (116 km) northeast of Boise and 19 miles (31 km) northwest of Stanley. It had a magnitude of 6.5 and was felt with a maximum intensity of VIII.

== Tectonic setting ==
Parts of central and eastern Idaho lie within the northern part of the Intermountain Seismic Belt (ISB). This area of relatively intense seismicity runs roughly north–south from northwestern Arizona, through Utah, Wyoming and Idaho, before dying out in northwestern Montana.

The ISB is characterized mainly by normal faulting of late Quaternary age, indicating active extensional tectonics, as recognized throughout the Basin and Range province to the south. Some historical earthquakes show evidence of strike-slip faulting such as with the two largest earthquakes of the 1935 Helena earthquake sequence.

== Historical seismicity ==
Historical seismicity in the immediate vicinity of the March 31 earthquake is sparse; no earthquakes of M5+ have occurred within 50 km (31 mi) of this event over the past fifty years, and the most notable historic seismicity in the region occurred about 100 km (62 mi) to the east on the Lost River fault zone. This was the site of the M6.9 Borah Peak earthquake (October 28, 1983), which was followed by five other M 5+ events over the following year, and most recently a M5.0 earthquake in January 2015, about 60 km (37 mi) to the east of the event.

The March 31 earthquake was reported to be felt in six different states, with nearly 50,000 reports of the shaking reported, as of March 2021.

== Earthquake ==
The shock measured 6.5 on the moment magnitude scale and had a maximum Mercalli intensity of VIII (Severe), based on damage reports. It was felt intensity IV (Light) in Boise, 115 km away. The observed focal mechanism is consistent with movement on a strike-slip fault. The solution found suggests either right lateral faulting on a fault trending west–east or left-lateral faulting on a fault trending north–south. Analysis of seismic waveforms supports left-lateral slip on a fault plane with a strike of 172°, dipping steeply to the west. The earthquake was about 16 km north of the northern tip of the Sawtooth Fault, a 60-km-long east-dipping normal fault that extends along the eastern base of the Sawtooth Range. There is currently no evidence of any surface rupture.

Left lateral strike-slip movement on a north–south trending fault came as a surprise as it does not seem to match the known orientation of the regional stress field. The north–south orientation is supported by InSAR data and the distribution of aftershocks. The fault responsible was not previously known and lacks any obvious topographic expression.

The quake had numerous aftershocks, including one with a magnitude of 4.8 on April 1, and another with a magnitude of 4.0 on April 3. As of April 8, 2020, there had been ~300 aftershocks of 2.5 magnitude or greater. Aftershocks continued to rock the area through September.

== Damage ==
Significant structural cracks were found on the Bridge services building and on the Custer County courthouse in Challis. A press release from Major Tom of the Sawtooth National Forest reported small avalanches were as far north as Bonners Ferry, near the Canadian border.

The Idaho Geological Survey was prevented from doing a ground survey inspection of the impacted region due to both heavy snowfall and a statewide travel ban that was in effect due to the COVID-19 pandemic. Two overflights revealed some avalanches that may have been caused as well as a few landslides across minor highways. A more detailed ground inspection was carried out in September 2020, but found no evidence of ground deformation or surface rupture.

== See also ==
- List of earthquakes in 2020
- List of earthquakes in the United States
- Geology of Idaho
