= 1983 Borah Peak earthquake =

Earthquake in Idaho, United States

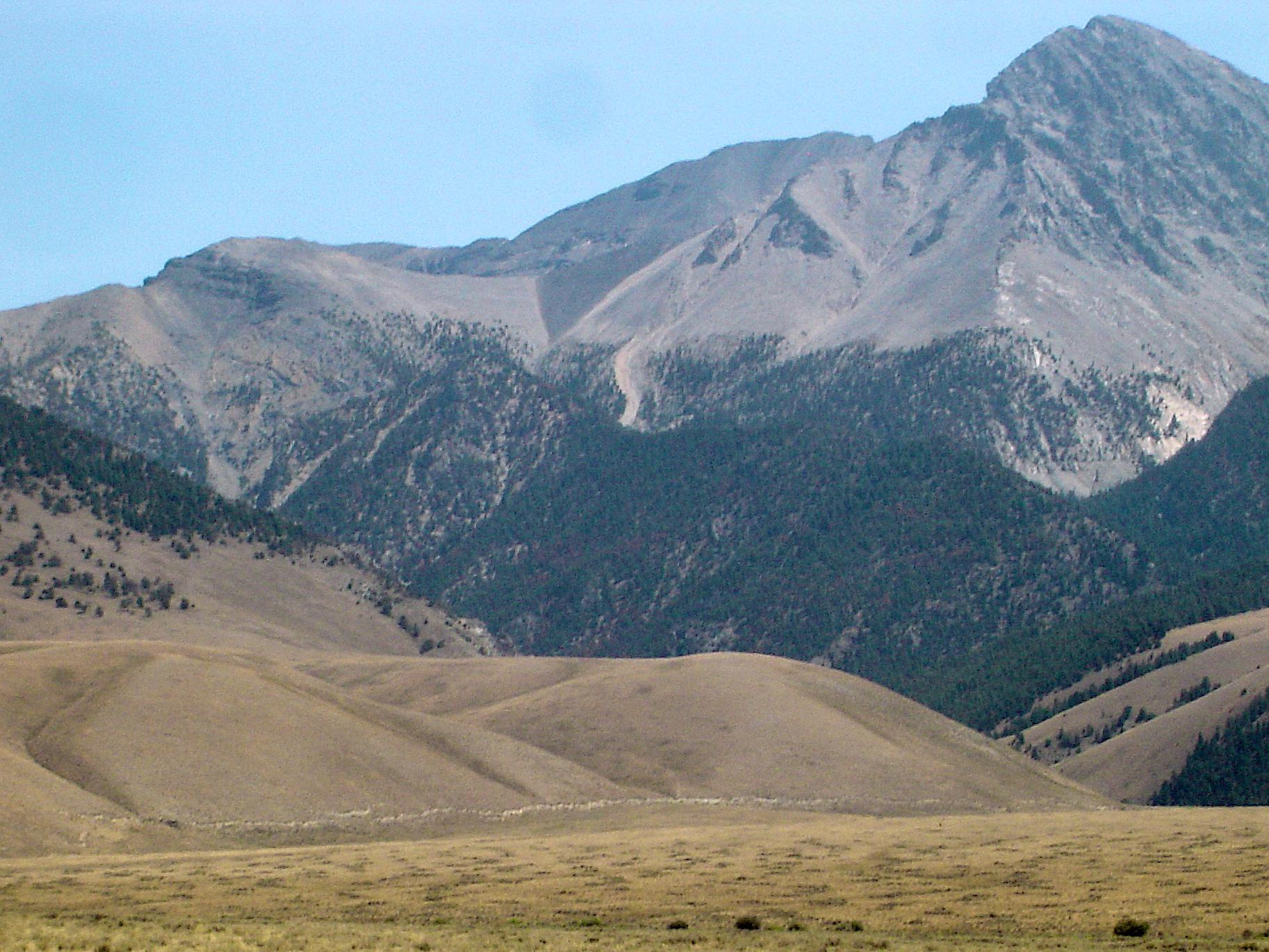
- Borah Peak with fault scarp seen near base of tan hill in foreground

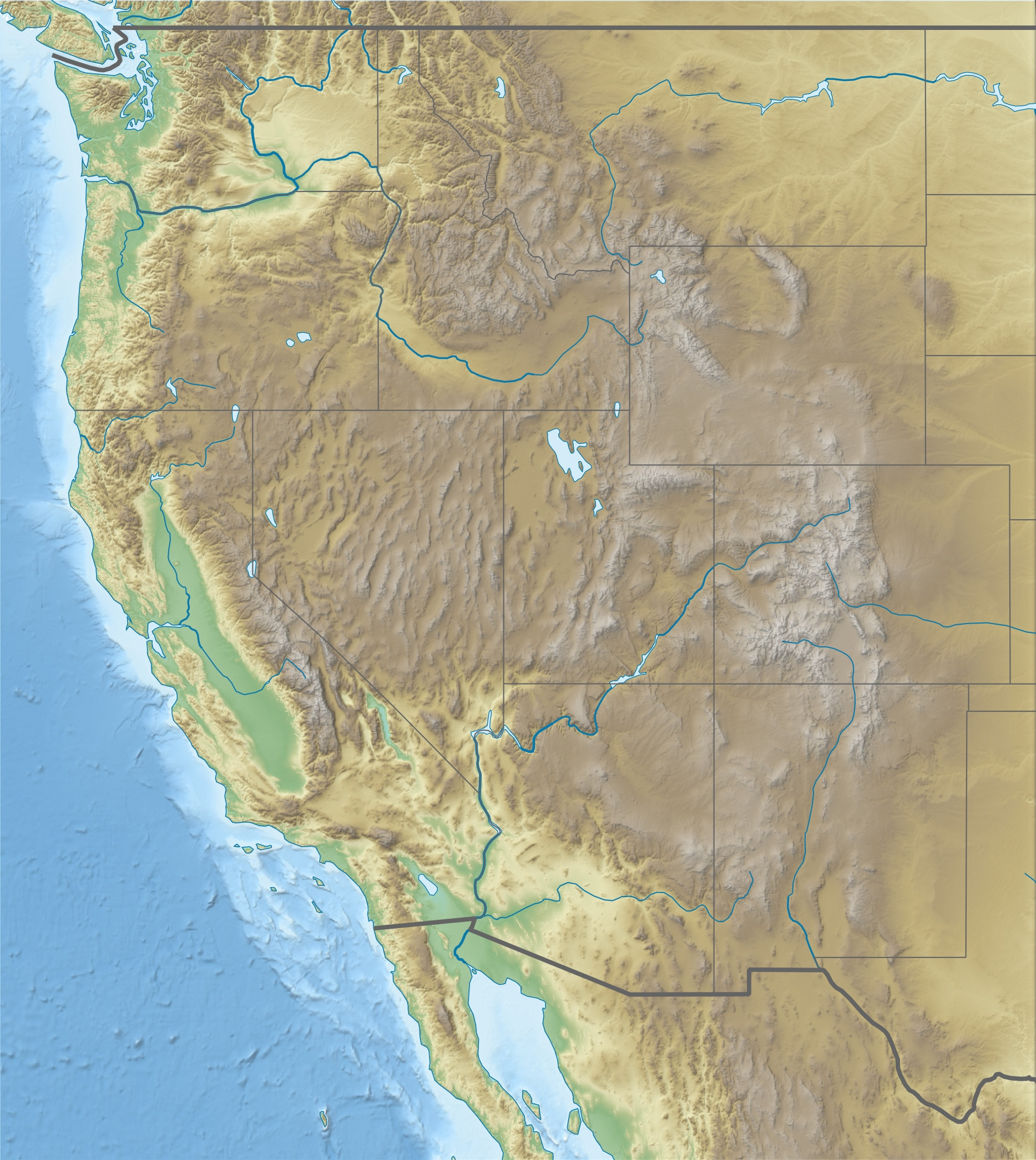
- Location within USA West Location within Idaho
- UTC time: 1983-10-28 14:06:09
- ISC event: 567352
- USGS-ANSS: ComCat
- Local date: October 28, 1983; 42 years ago
- Local time: 08:06 MDT
- Magnitude: 6.9 M_{w}
- Depth: 16 km (9.9 mi)
- Epicenter: 44.08°N 113.8°W
- Fault: Lost River Fault
- Type: Normal
- Areas affected: Central Idaho; United States
- Total damage: $12.5 million
- Max. intensity: MMI IX (Violent)
- Landslides: Yes
- Aftershocks: 5.6 M_{w} Oct 28 at 19:51 UTC; 5.5 M_{w} Oct 29 at 23:29 UTC
- Casualties: 2 killed, three injured

The 1983 Borah Peak earthquake occurred on October 28, at 8:06:09 a.m. MDT in the western United States, in the Lost River Range at Borah Peak in central Idaho.

The shock measured 6.9 on the moment magnitude scale and had a maximum Mercalli intensity of IX (Violent). It was the most violent earthquake in the lower 48 states in over 24 years, since the 1959 Hebgen Lake earthquake in nearby southwestern Montana.

== Earthquake ==
The Friday morning earthquake was caused by a slip on the preexisting Lost River Fault. The event is the largest and most significant to strike in the state of Idaho. As a result of extreme surface faulting, a maximum Mercalli intensity of IX (Violent) was decided upon, while vibrational damage was at a Mercalli intensity of VI (Strong) to VII (Very strong). Three weeks later on November 18, President Ronald Reagan declared the earthquake a major disaster.

Aftershocks were felt for a year afterwards; nearly ten months later, a 5.4 aftershock was recorded on August 22, 1984.

=== Surface faulting ===
The rupture caused clear surface faulting; a 21-mile (34 km) long northwest-trending zone of fresh scarps and ground ruptures was present on a slope of the Lost River Range. Extensive breakage occurred along a five-mile (8 km) zone between West Spring and Cedar Creek; ground surface was literally "shattered" into tilted blocks, each several meters in width. These scarps were as broad as 330 feet (100 m).

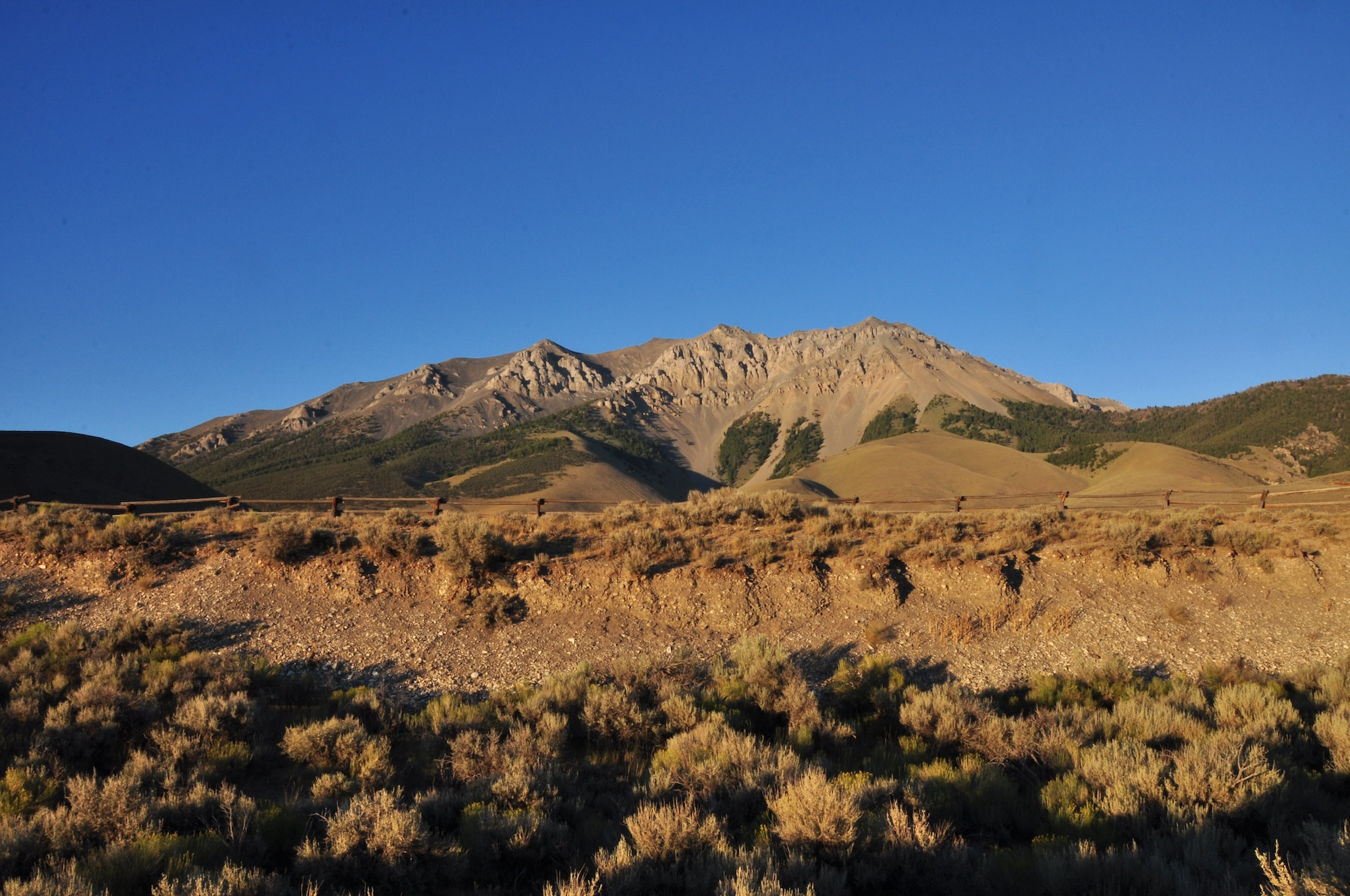
A segment of the Borah Peak earthquake fault scarp near Willow Creek

The ground breakage was sixty miles (100 km), and the throw on the faulting ranged from −1.6 to 8.9 feet (−0.5 to 2.7 m).

=== Damage ===
The Challis-Mackay region experienced rather thorough damage, with eleven commercial buildings and 39 homes sustaining major damage while another 200 houses suffered minor to moderate damage. Mackay in particular, about fifty miles (80 km) southeast of Challis, experienced the most severe damage. Most of the city's large buildings on its Main Street were damaged, to some extent; eight of these buildings were deemed condemned and closed down. Most of these buildings were built from materials such as brick, concrete block, and stone, each varying.

An estimated $12.5 million in property damage was recorded. In some places, the water grounds shifted.

=== Fatalities and injuries ===
In Challis, two children were killed when a stone storefront collapsed on them while walking to school; two others suffered minor injuries. In Mackay, a woman was hospitalized due to her injuries.

=== Old Faithful ===
After the earthquake and aftershocks, the eruption intervals of Old Faithful geyser in Yellowstone National Park, about 150 miles (240 km) east, were noticeably lengthened.

=== Sand blows ===
Near Chilly Buttes of Thousand Springs Valley, a series of artesian fountains/sand blows erupted immediately after the main shock. Groundwater gushed from these fountains forming small craters and depositing aprons of light-colored sandy sediment around each crater. The blows were noted largely along waterways, especially where draws, or small streams, enter into larger ones. Observers noted that some blows had black, sediment-laden water while others ran mostly clear. Some blows continued for several minutes after the shaking stopped. The Big Lost River rose several inches as a result of this water being expelled from the ground. The eruptions were likely a response to liquefaction of a water-laden underground sediment layer.

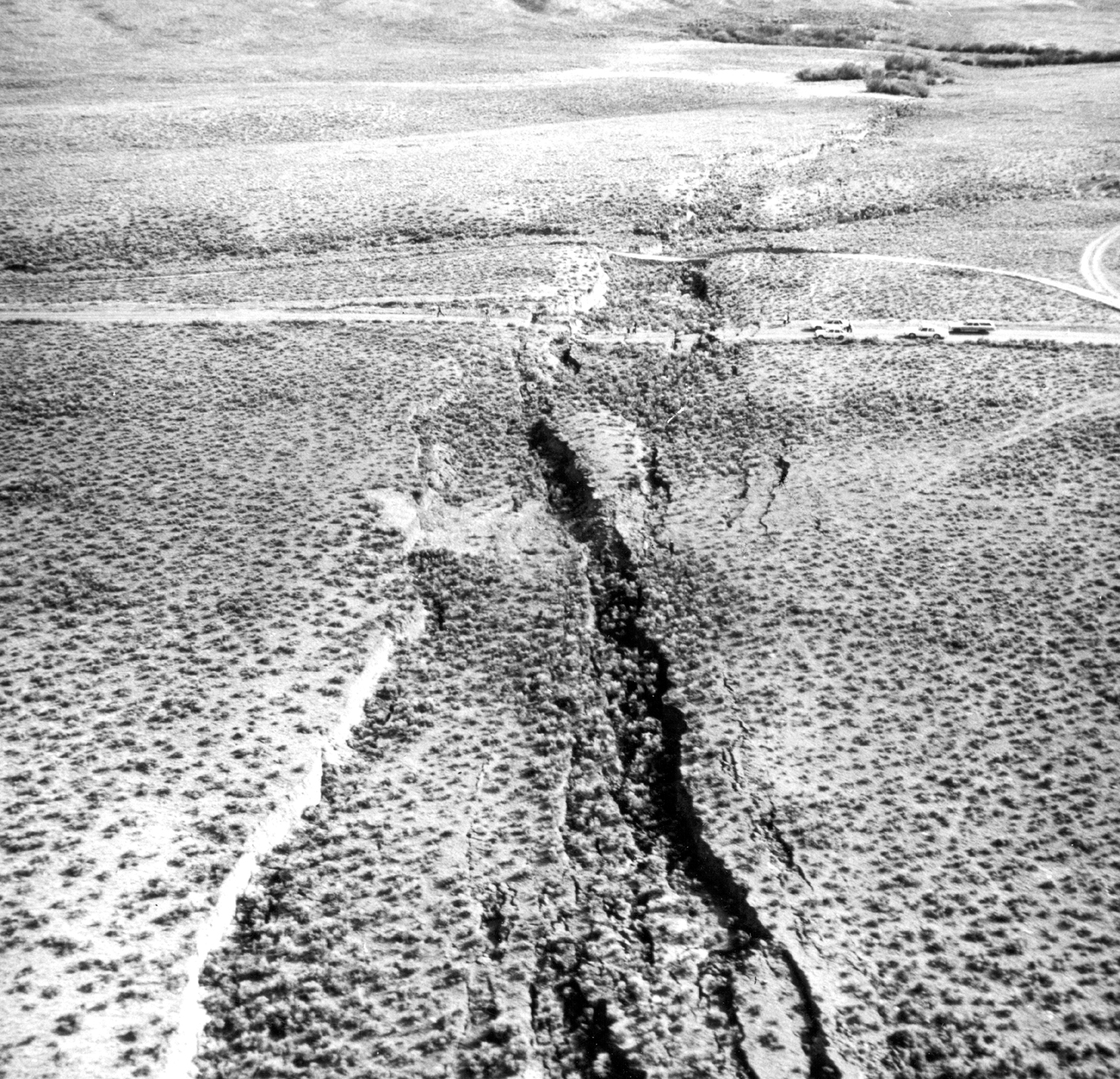
Fault scarps that outline the graben produced near Willow Creek

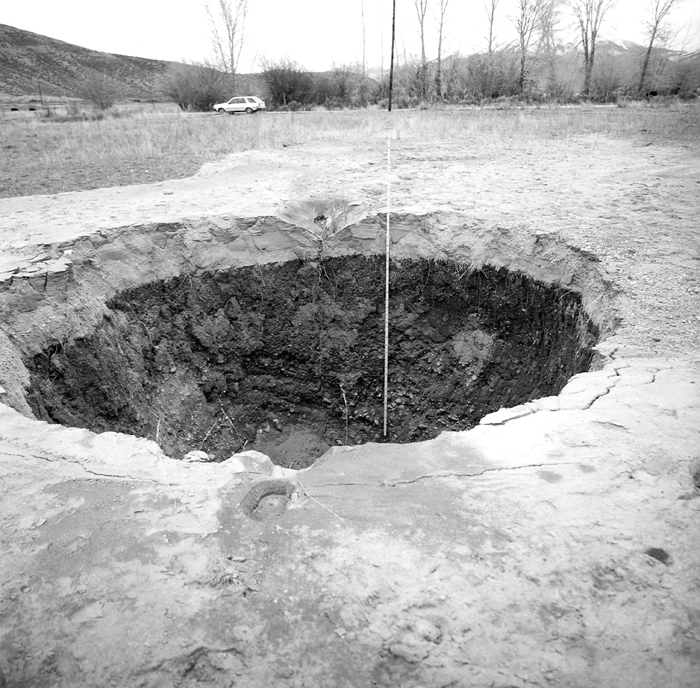
Crater caused by an artesian fountain

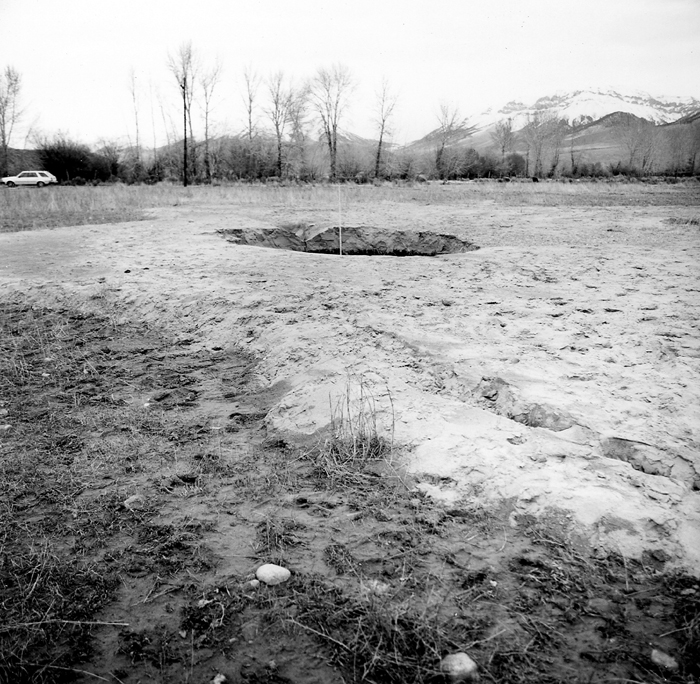
Another view of the same fountain

== See also ==
- List of earthquakes in 1983
- List of earthquakes in the United States
- Geology of Idaho
- 2020 Central Idaho earthquake
