= Fishfin Ridge =

Mountain in Idaho, United States

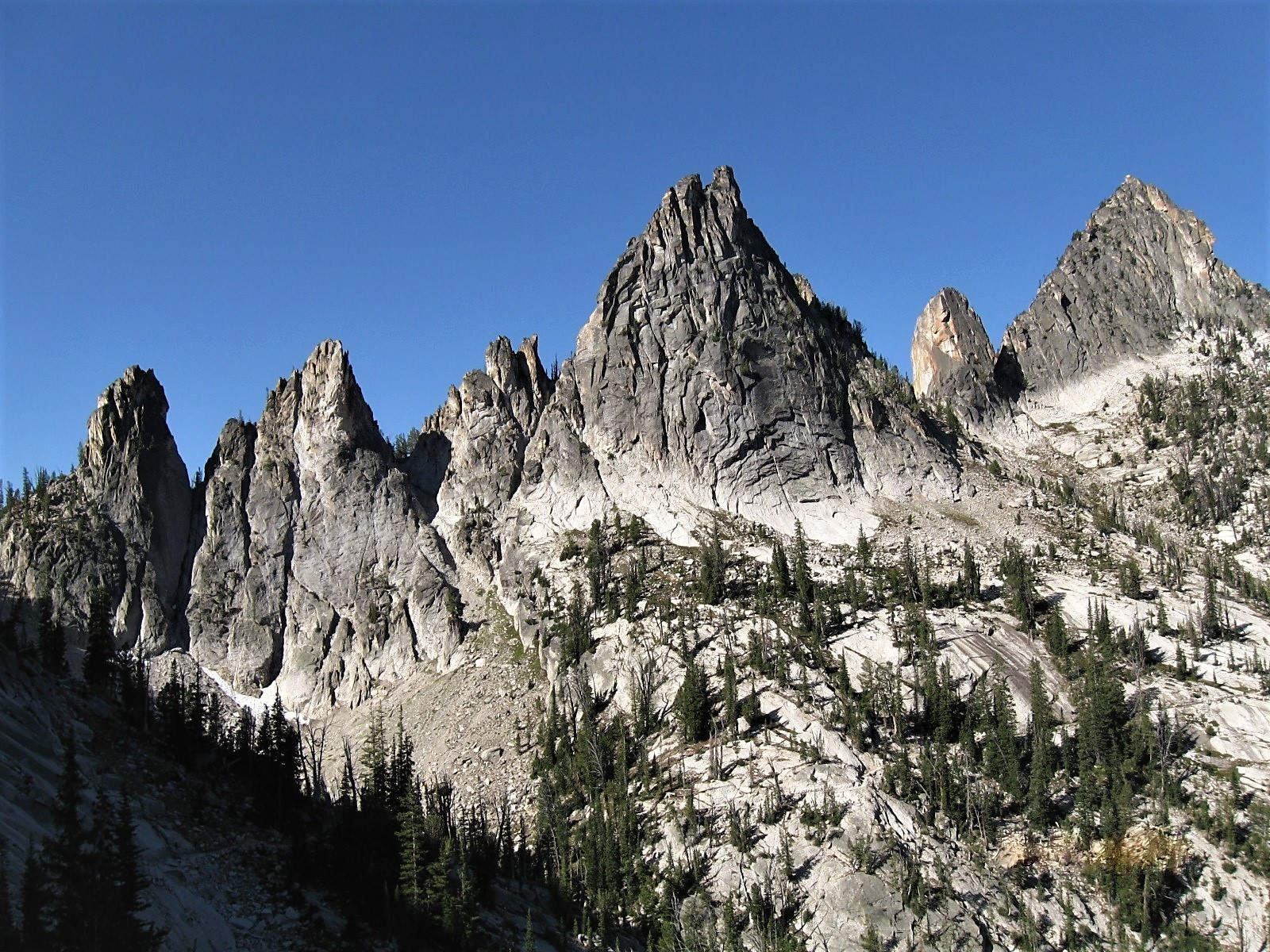
- Fishfin Ridge, northeast aspect

Highest point
- Elevation: 9,700 ft (2,957 m)
- Prominence: 360 ft (110 m)
- Isolation: 0.44 mi (0.71 km)
- Coordinates: 45°08′47″N 114°35′11″W

Geography
- Location within Idaho Location within the United States
- Location: Frank Church–River of No Return Wilderness
- Country: United States of America
- State: Idaho
- County: Lemhi
- Parent range: Bighorn Crags; Salmon River Mountains; Rocky Mountains
- Topo map: USGS Mount McGuire

Geology
- Rock age: Eocene
- Mountain type: Ridge
- Rock type: Granite

Climbing
- First ascent: 1955
- Easiest route: class 5.2 climbing

Fishfin Ridge is a 9,700-foot elevation (2,957 m) mountain ridge located in Lemhi County, Idaho, United States.

== Description ==
Fishfin Ridge is part of the Bighorn Crags in the Salmon River Mountains which are a subset of the Rocky Mountains. The remote ridge is situated 30 miles west of Salmon, Idaho, in the Frank Church–River of No Return Wilderness. An approach is possible from July through October via a multi-day backpacking trip along trails. Precipitation runoff from the mountain drains to the Salmon River via Clear Creek (north slope) and Wilson Creek (south slope). Topographic relief is modest as the summit rises 1,700 feet (520 meters) above Clear Creek in approximately one mile. This landform's toponym has been officially adopted by the United States Board on Geographic Names, and the highest point is unofficially known as "Knuckle Peak." The first ascent of Knuckle Peak was made by Lincoln Hales and Pete Schoening in 1955. Fishfin Ridge was named in 1962 by Dr. Paul Dilke of University of Idaho because it looks like a dorsal fin of a prehistoric fish.

== Climate ==
Based on the Köppen climate classification, Fishfin Ridge is located in an alpine subarctic climate zone with long, cold, snowy winters, and cool to warm summers. Winter temperatures can drop below −10 °F with wind chill factors below −30 °F.

== See also ==
- List of mountain peaks of Idaho
