= Sunflower Hot Springs =

Thermal spring

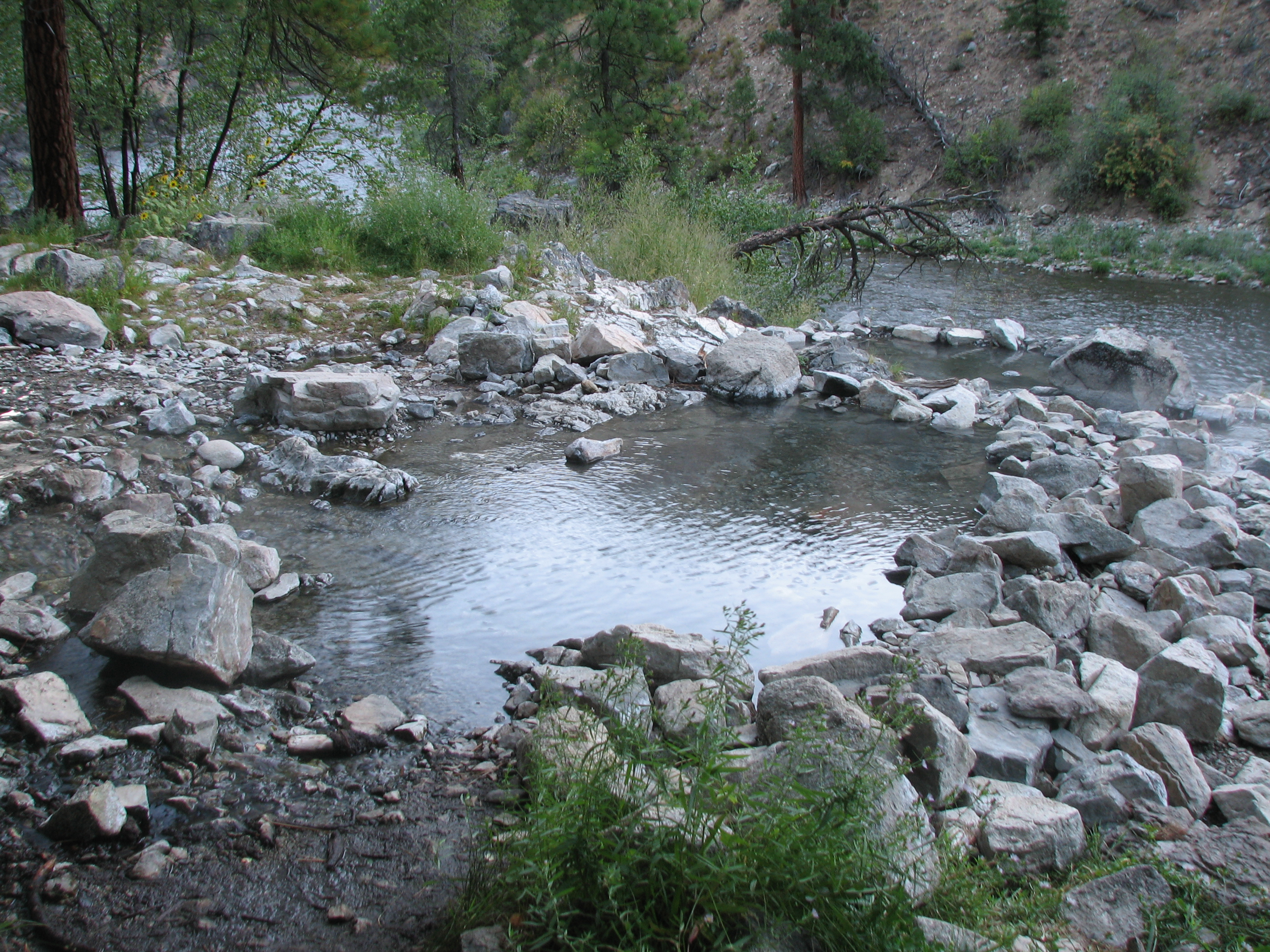
- Sunflower Hot Springs Pools Sunflower Hot Springs
- Interactive map of Sunflower Hot Springs
- Location: Middle Fork of the Salmon River, Idaho
- Coordinates: 44°43′46″N 114°59′34″W
- Elevation: 4,357 ft (1,328 m)
- Type: geothermal spring
- Temperature: 149 °F (65 °C)

Sunflower Hot Springs is a geothermal mineral spring in Boise National Forest, Idaho, United States.

== Location ==
The springs are located at the Middle Fork of the Salmon River in the state of Idaho. This area was used by the Shoshone and Nez Perce prior to the arrival of fur trappers, miners, and later early homesteaders. The springs are located at an elevation of 4,357 feet (1,328 m).

== Water profile and geography ==
The spring water emerges from the bedrock 30 feet above the river at a temperature of 149 °F (65 °C). The springs have five rock pools, and part of the hot spring water cools to 102° as it cascades off a rock to create a primitive hot shower. Mineral content of the water includes calcium, potassium, magnesium, sulfate, with a pH of 8.7.

== See also ==
- List of hot springs in the United States
- List of hot springs in the world
