= South Fork Salmon River =

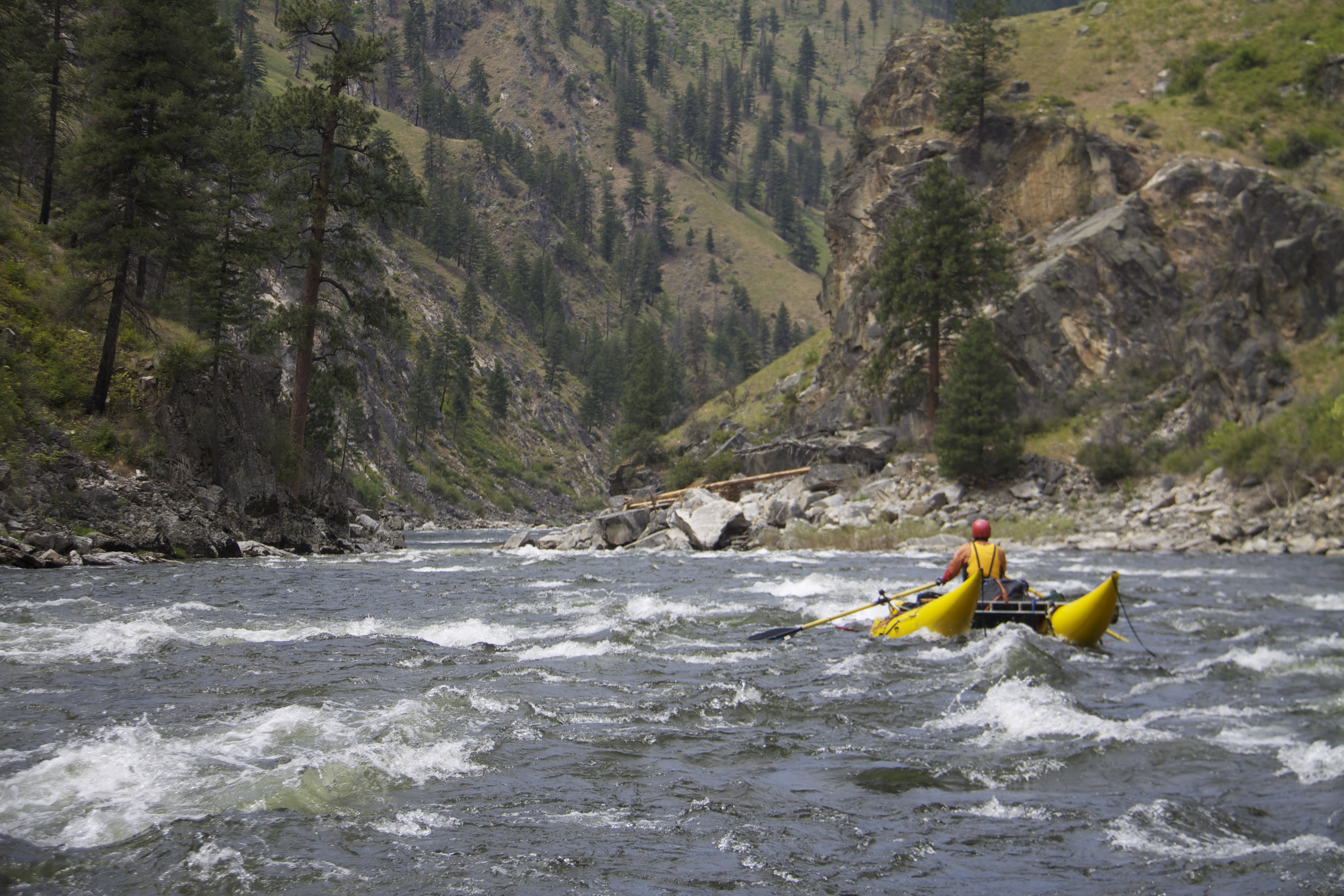
- Rafters on the South Fork Salmon River

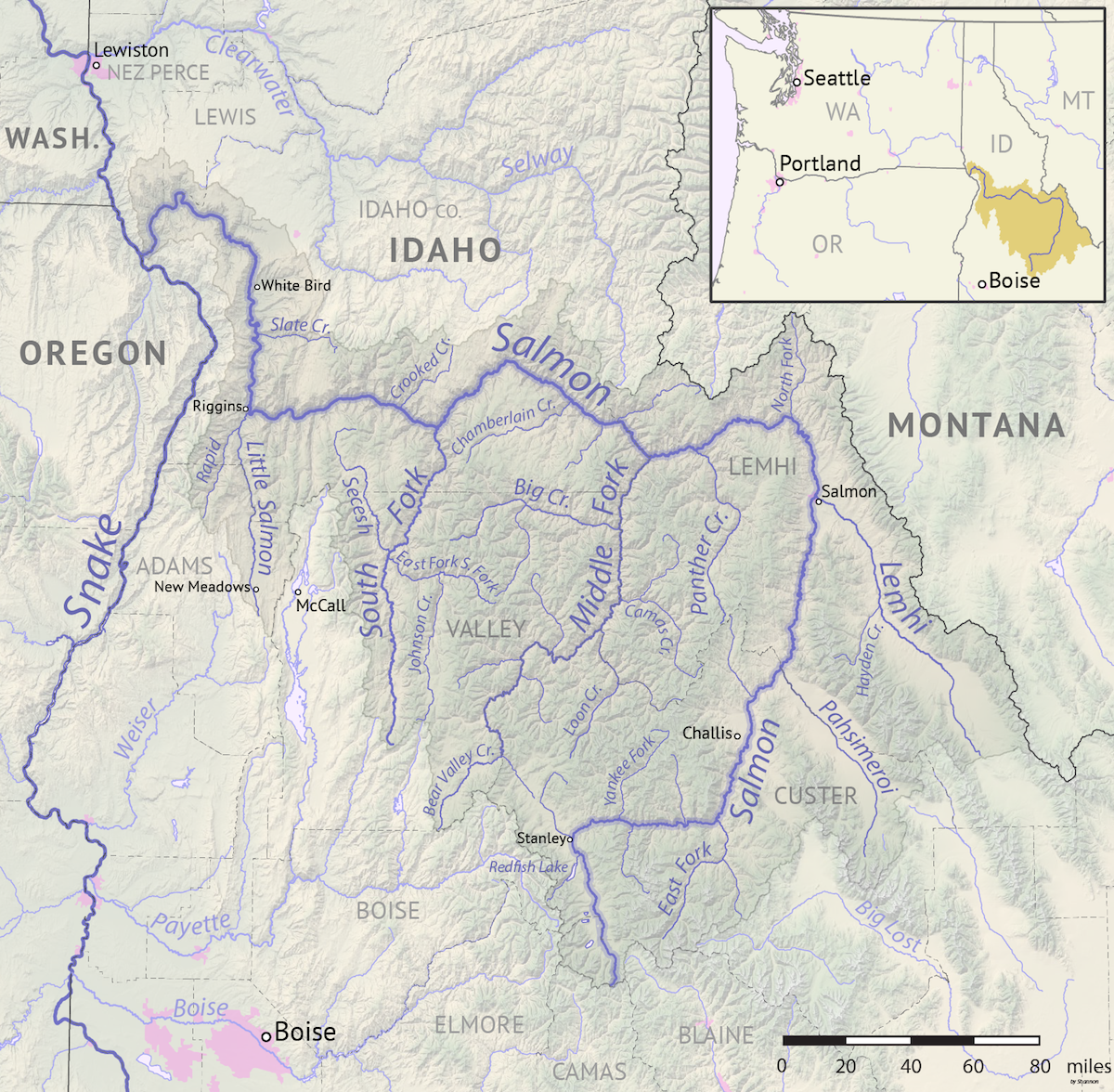
- Map showing the Salmon River basin. The South Fork is the second major tributary from left.

Location
- Country: United States
- State: Idaho

Physical characteristics
- Source: near Monumental Peak
  - location: Salmon River Mountains, Valley County
  - coordinates: 44°28′47″N 115°41′06″W
  - elevation: 7,600 ft (2,300 m)
- Mouth: Salmon River
  - location: near Mackay Bar, Idaho County
  - coordinates: 45°22′40″N 115°30′47″W
  - elevation: 2,146 ft (654 m)
- Length: 86 mi (138 km)
- Basin size: 1,309 sq mi (3,390 km^{2})
- Discharge
  - location: Mackay Bar
  - average: 1,983 cu ft/s (56.2 m^{3}/s)
  - minimum: 318 cu ft/s (9.0 m^{3}/s)
  - maximum: 21,600 cu ft/s (610 m^{3}/s)

Basin features
- Tributaries
  - left: Secesh River
  - right: East Fork, Elk Creek

The South Fork Salmon River is an 86-mile (138 km) tributary of the Salmon River in Idaho and Valley Counties in central Idaho. The river drains a rugged, lightly populated wilderness watershed in the Salmon River Mountains. It is the second-largest tributary of the Salmon River, after the Middle Fork.

== Geography ==
Beginning near 7,902-foot (2,409 m) Monumental Peak in the Boise National Forest, the river flows generally north to its confluence with the Salmon near Mackay Bar, about 135 miles (217 km) above the larger river's mouth on the Snake River. About midway along its course, it is joined by its two main tributaries – the East Fork South Fork Salmon River from the east and the Secesh River from the west. The river receives runoff from a total of 1,309 square miles (3,390 km^{2}) of land, ranging in elevation from 9,322 feet (2,841 m) at North Loon Mountain to 2,146 feet (654 m) at the mouth of the river.

== History ==
The Native Americans living along the river were the Nez Perce, Shoshone, Bannock and Paiute. The river and its valley were used largely for fishing, hunting, and gathering, while local hot springs provided camping sites during the winter.

The first recorded Europeans to see the South Fork may have been a group of mountain men working under the American Fur Company in 1831. They crossed the upper part of the river while reconnoitering the western part of the Salmon River system for good beaver streams. In the 1860s, prospectors discovered gold on the South Fork, leading to the initial settlement of the drainage by Westerners. After the gold rush faded, some miners stayed on as homesteaders and ranchers.

The drainage was heavily logged from the 1940s to the mid-1960s, when an estimated 320 million board feet of timber was taken from the basin. More than 800 miles (1,300 km) of logging roads were constructed across the drainage.

== Ecology ==
The South Fork is an important habitat for Chinook salmon, Westslope cutthroat trout, bull trout and steelhead trout and has been designated critical habitat for salmon. Although the aquatic habitat in the South Fork drainage is considered good, some tributaries have been damaged by logging, mining, and road-building activities, which has increased the sediment load in the river. About 340 miles (550 km) of backcountry roads in the drainage have been decommissioned and are undergoing restoration by the U.S. Forest Service.

Plant communities in the South Fork drainage range from grassland and shrubland, Ponderosa pine, Douglas fir and grand fir forests at lower elevations, to subalpine fir, lodgepole pine, whitebark pine and aspen at mid to high elevations. Among large mammals, the watershed is home to Rocky Mountain elk, white-tailed deer, mule deer, black bear, cougar, mountain goat, bighorn sheep and gray wolf. The area has over 200 confirmed species of resident and migratory birds.

== Hydrology ==
The United States Geological Survey (USGS) operated a stream gage at the mouth of the South Fork between 1993 and 2003, recording an annual mean of 1,983 cu ft/s (56.2 m^{3}/s). The highest annual mean was 3,125 cu ft/s (88.5 m^{3}/s) in 1997, and the lowest was 869.9 cu ft/s (24.63 m^{3}/s) in 2001. Mean monthly discharge rates for the South Fork are displayed in the below graph.

Monthly discharges at Mackay Bar (cfs)

== Recreation ==
Although not as frequently run as the Middle Fork, the South Fork is also well known for challenging whitewater. Boaters frequently put in at the Secesh River, about 37 miles (60 km) above the mouth of the South Fork on the main stem Salmon. Because of their relatively pristine condition, the South Fork and its tributary, the Secesh are being considered for inclusion in the National Wild and Scenic Rivers system.

== See also ==
- List of rivers of Idaho
