= Ellis, Idaho =

Unincorporated community in the state of Idaho, United States

- Unincorporated community
- Location within Idaho Location within the United States
- Coordinates: 44°41′31″N 114°02′54″W
- Country: United States
- State: Idaho
- County: Custer
- Elevation: 4,623 ft (1,409 m)
- Time zone: UTC-7 (Mountain (MST))
  - Summer (DST): UTC-6 (MDT)
- ZIP code: 83235
- Area codes: 208, 986
- GNIS feature ID: 381426

Ellis is an unincorporated community in Custer County, Idaho, United States, located on U.S. Route 93 15.5 miles (24.9 km) northeast of Challis. The town consists solely of a post office, with ZIP code 83235.

== Geography ==
Ellis lies in the Pahsimeroi Valley, on U.S. Route 93 in Idaho, 15.5 miles (24.9 km) northeast of Challis. It is near the border of Lemhi County and Custer County.

== History ==
Ellis appears on state maps as early as 1887. Ellis' population was 20 in 1909, and 10 in 1960. Ellis once had its own store and cafe, which burned down in 1975; the fire also damaged the post office, which was relocated to a new building as a result.

== See also ==
- Chilly, Idaho
