= Pahsimeroi River =

- Location of the mouth of the Pahsimeroi River in Idaho Pahsimeroi River (the United States)

Location
- Country: United States
- State: Idaho
- Counties: Lemhi, Custer

Physical characteristics
- Source
  - coordinates: 44°4′22″N 113°40′14″W
  - elevation: 7,745 ft (2,361 m)
- Mouth: Salmon River
  - coordinates: 44°41′31″N 114°2′55″W
  - elevation: 4,640 ft (1,410 m)
- Length: 59 mi (95 km)
- Basin size: 827 sq mi (2,140 km^{2})
- Discharge
  - location: at mouth
  - average: 230 cu ft/s (6.5 m^{3}/s)
  - minimum: 87 cu ft/s (2.5 m^{3}/s)
  - maximum: 710 cu ft/s (20 m^{3}/s)

The Pahsimeroi River is a 58.7-mile-long (94.5 km) river in Idaho in the United States. It is a tributary of the Salmon River, which in turn is a tributary to the Snake River and Columbia River.

== Course ==
From its source in Custer County, at the confluence of the West Fork and East Fork headwaters, the Pahsimeroi River flows generally northwest, through the Pahsimeroi Valley, between the Lemhi Range to the east, and the Lost River Range and to the west.

The Pahsimeroi River joins the Salmon River near Ellis, Idaho, upriver from Salmon, Idaho.

== River modification ==
The water of the Pahsimeroi River and its tributaries is used for irrigation agriculture. All of the river's mainstem tributaries are wholly diverted and totally disconnected year round due to diversion for irrigation.

== See also ==
- List of rivers in Idaho
- List of longest streams of Idaho
