= White Mountain (Idaho) =

Mountain in Idaho, United States

- Location within Idaho

Highest point
- Elevation: 3,183 m (10,443 ft)
- Prominence: 1,147 m (3,763 ft)
- Parent peak: Peak 10620, Idaho
- Isolation: 47.56 km (29.55 mi)
- Coordinates: 44.57476°N 114.49565°W

Geography
- Location: Custer County, Idaho
- Parent range: Salmon River Mountains

White Mountain, or White Mountain West, is the highest peak in the Salmon River Mountains in Idaho, USA, with an elevation of 10,442 feet (3,183 m).

== Location ==
White Mountain is in Custer County, Idaho, at 44.57476°N 114.49565°W. (Note: The USGS quad labels pt.9870, a minor point to the east of the actual peak, as White Mountain. Some sources name the higher peak "White Mountain West". A request has been made to transfer the official name to the higher peak.) It is named after the bright white rock on the north and west sides of the mountain, although the summit is of gray-brown rock. It is the highest peak in the Salmon River Mountains, in the southeast of that range, with an elevation of 10,442 feet (3,183 m). It is on the edge of the Frank Church Wilderness and is administered by the Salmon-Challis National Forest.

== Description ==
White Mountain has a clear prominence of 3,762 feet (1,147 m) and isolation of 29.55 miles (47.56 km). Its nearest higher neighbor is Peak 10620, Idaho, to the ESE at 44.367411°N 113.970193°W. Class three climbing is required to reach the top. The east face is the steepest, and rises over the Twin Creek Lakes basin.

== Climate ==
The south peak of Twin Peaks (Idaho) is next to White Mountain.

Climate data for Twin Peaks South 44.5924 N, 114.4774 W, Elevation: 9,816 ft (2,992 m) (1991–2020 normals)
Month	Jan	Feb	Mar	Apr	May	Jun	Jul	Aug	Sep	Oct	Nov	Dec	Year
Mean daily maximum °F (°C)	23.5 (−4.7)	23.8 (−4.6)	29.5 (−1.4)	35.1 (1.7)	44.0 (6.7)	53.0 (11.7)	65.2 (18.4)	64.6 (18.1)	55.1 (12.8)	41.4 (5.2)	28.3 (−2.1)	22.1 (−5.5)	40.5 (4.7)
Daily mean °F (°C)	16.5 (−8.6)	15.7 (−9.1)	19.9 (−6.7)	24.5 (−4.2)	33.0 (0.6)	41.4 (5.2)	52.1 (11.2)	51.5 (10.8)	42.8 (6.0)	31.3 (−0.4)	21.1 (−6.1)	15.4 (−9.2)	30.4 (−0.9)
Mean daily minimum °F (°C)	9.6 (−12.4)	7.6 (−13.6)	10.2 (−12.1)	13.9 (−10.1)	22.0 (−5.6)	29.7 (−1.3)	38.9 (3.8)	38.3 (3.5)	30.5 (−0.8)	21.1 (−6.1)	13.8 (−10.1)	8.8 (−12.9)	20.4 (−6.5)
Average precipitation inches (mm)	3.62 (92)	2.90 (74)	3.42 (87)	3.14 (80)	2.87 (73)	2.61 (66)	1.11 (28)	0.97 (25)	1.47 (37)	2.19 (56)	3.07 (78)	3.84 (98)	31.21 (794)
Source: PRISM Climate Group

== Sources ==
- Tom Lopez, "White Mountain", IDAHO: A Climbing Guide
- "White Mountain (ID)", SummitPost.org
- "White Mountain West, Idaho", Peakbagger.com
