= Central Idaho =

Coordinates: 44°24′N 114°05′W

- Region
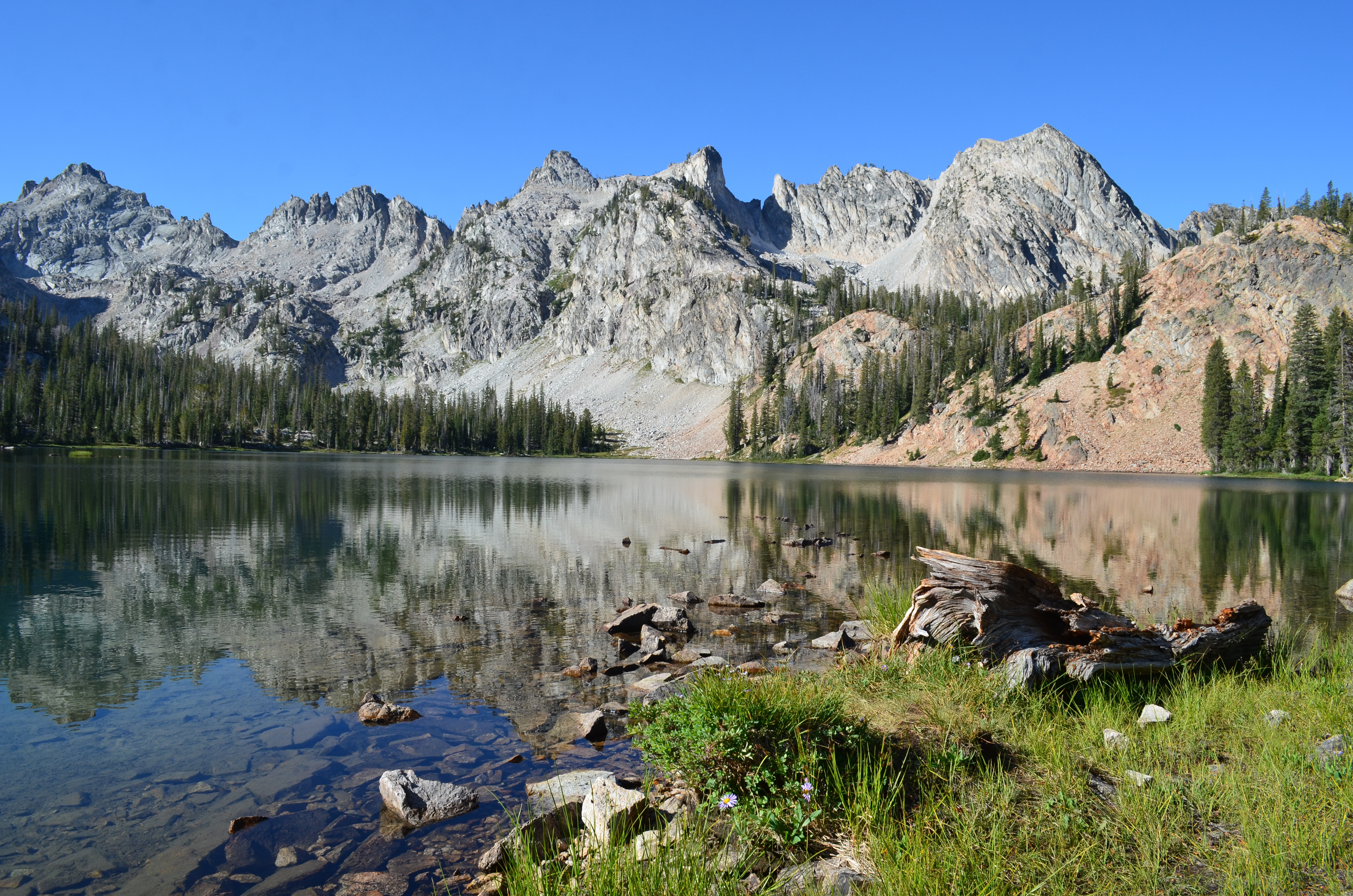
- Alice Lake in the Sawtooth National Recreation Area in Blaine County.

- Map of counties included in Central Idaho (highlighted in red).
- Country: United States
- State: Idaho
- Largest city: Hailey (pop.: 8,689)

Area (Note: If Blaine and Camas counties are considered to be part of the Magic Valley rather than Central Idaho, then the area would be 11,722.4 sq miles. Since Blaine and Camas are generally considered to simultaneously be part of both areas, this article (as well as the Magic Valley article) both include Camas and Blaine county in their area calculations.)
  - Total: 15,434.3 sq mi (39,975 km^{2})

Population (2020) (Note: Population density is calculated by 2020 Census figures divided by area, including Blaine and Camas counties. See note a for more details.)
  - Total: 40,172
  - Density: 2.6/sq mi (1.0/km^{2})
- Time zone: UTC−7 (Mountain)
  - Summer (DST): UTC−6 (MDT)
- Area codes: 208, 986

Central Idaho is a geographical term for the region located northeast of Boise and southeast of Lewiston in the U.S. state of Idaho. It is dominated by federal lands administered by the United States Forest Service and the Bureau of Land Management. Idaho's tallest mountain, Borah Peak, is located in this region. A large part of the Sawtooth National Recreation Area is within Central Idaho.

The counties of Blaine, Butte, Camas, Custer, and Lemhi are included in the region. The southern Central Idaho region — particularly Blaine and Camas counties — is also known as the Wood River Valley after the Big Wood River. Blaine and Camas counties are also considered to be part of the Magic Valley region of Southern Idaho.

== Demographics ==
In the 2020 Census, the five county region had a combined population of 40,172 people; only 2.1% of the entire state's population. Camas, Butte, and Custer counties are among the least populated in the state, each having less than 5,000 residents; Butte County lost 10.43% of its population in the last decade according to a 2024 estimate, making Central Idaho one of, if not the least populated area in Idaho.

The largest city in the area is the town of Hailey located in Blaine County, with a population of 8,689. Other notable cities include Stanley, Challis, Salmon, Fairfield, and Arco.

== History ==
The area of Central Idaho has been inhabited since at least 12,000 years ago by the Northern Shoshone, Bannock, and Northern Paiute peoples, where the cycle of sockeye salmon runs sustained the Native American population. As colonization and expansion of the United States progressed into the western region of the continent, these tribes were forcefully removed from their homes in the late-1800s; despite this, traditional hunting and harvesting continued in parts of the Sawtooths.

After removal of the natives, Idaho developed an economy that relied on agriculture, lumber, and mining. Silver mining became extensively popular in the area. Towards the end of the 19th-century, sheepherding became popular with Basque, Peruvian, and Scottish immigrants, and replaced silver extraction as the area's core economic basis. Sheepherders in the area maintained over 300,000 individual sheep in the early 20th-century.

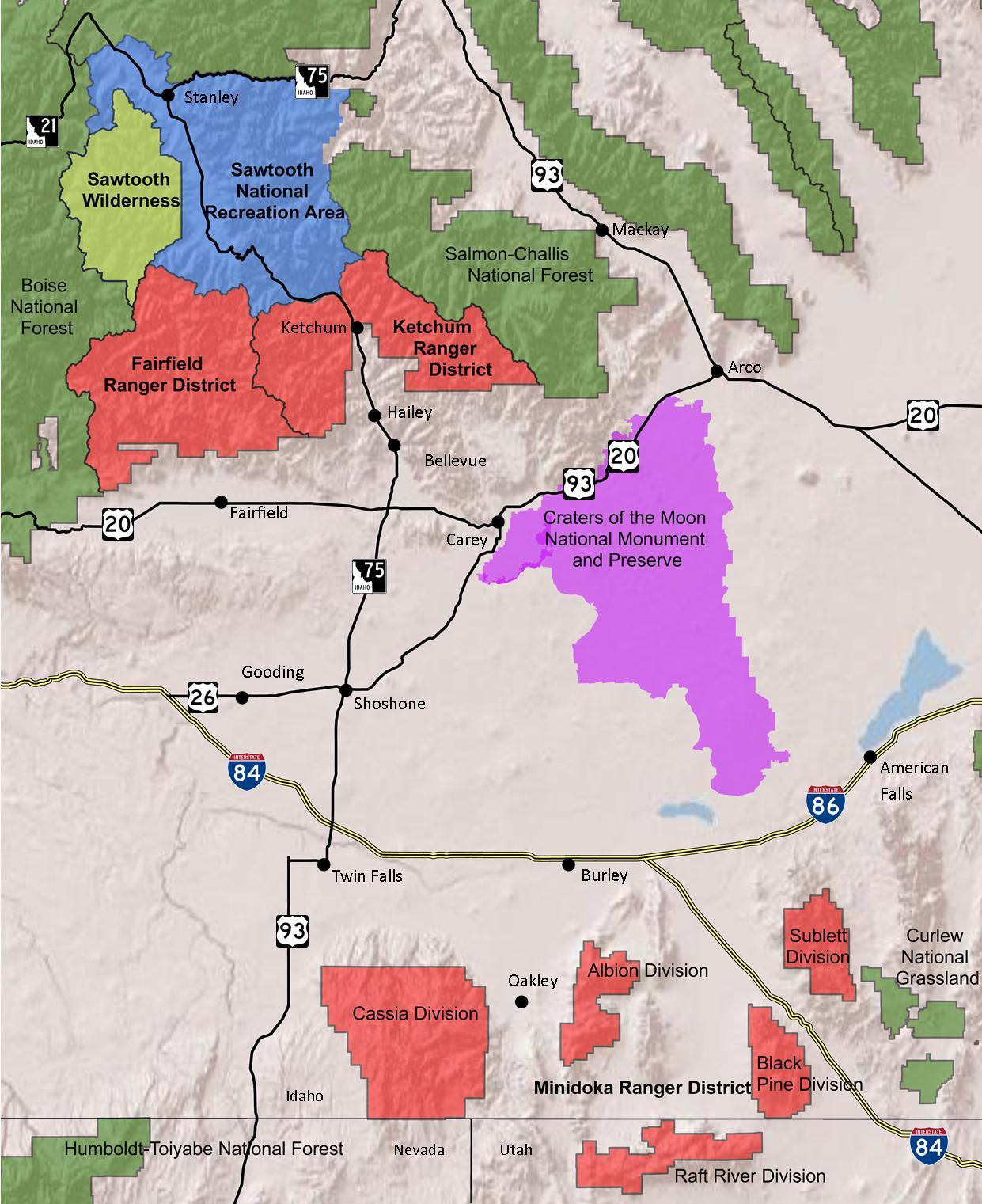
A map of the Sawtooth National Forest, overlaid with roads and cities. The Sawtooth National Recreation Area of Central Idaho is colored blue.

The Central Idaho area, while being used for industry, was also used for recreational activities, such as camping, fishing, and hunting. Proposals were made in the early-1900's to establish a Sawtooth National Park in the area, but this idea was blocked by the start of World War I. The idea was later reproposed by Idaho U.S. Senator James Pope during the interwar period in 1935, but met opposition from industry leaders and companies, as well as the U.S. Forest Service, who did not want to lose their administration rights to the National Park Service.

Meanwhile, Arco, Idaho became the first city in the United States to have its entire power supply generated from nuclear power. On July 17, 1955, electricity produced from an experimental nuclear reactor at the Argonne National Laboratory (now the Idaho National Laboratory), supplied the entire city's population of 1,200 electricity for more than an hour, becoming the first city in the United States to be entirely sustained by nuclear power for its electrical demands.

25 years after Pope's proposal, in 1960, Frank Church, another U.S. Senator from Idaho, began to launch efforts to protect the area, which resulted in a proposal of a "National Recreation Area," which would keep the administrative rights with the Forest Service. While this idea was being developed, the American Smelting and Refining Company, or ASARCO, was investigating a possible molybdenum extraction site in the area, which was met with vehement opposition from citizens of Idaho. After much debate, a large part of Central Idaho was deemed as under protection and conservation with the 1972 Sawtooth NRA Act, which protects a large part of Central Idaho's backcountry, fish, and game from urban sprawl and land division.

Today, herding continues to be a core part of the area, as well as recreation. The area remains sparsely populated, as the mountainous terrain, aforementioned environmental protections, and lack of infrastructure provide barriers to excessive human development.

Central Idaho has also been the origin site of multiple earthquakes, due to its high geological activity. On March 31, 2020, a 6.5 earthquake struck the area, with its epicenter originating in central Idaho. A similar earthquake in 1983 also originated in Central Idaho, with a moment magnitude of 6.9.

== Culture ==
Most residents of the area continue to value the historical importance of industry and natural resources of the area.

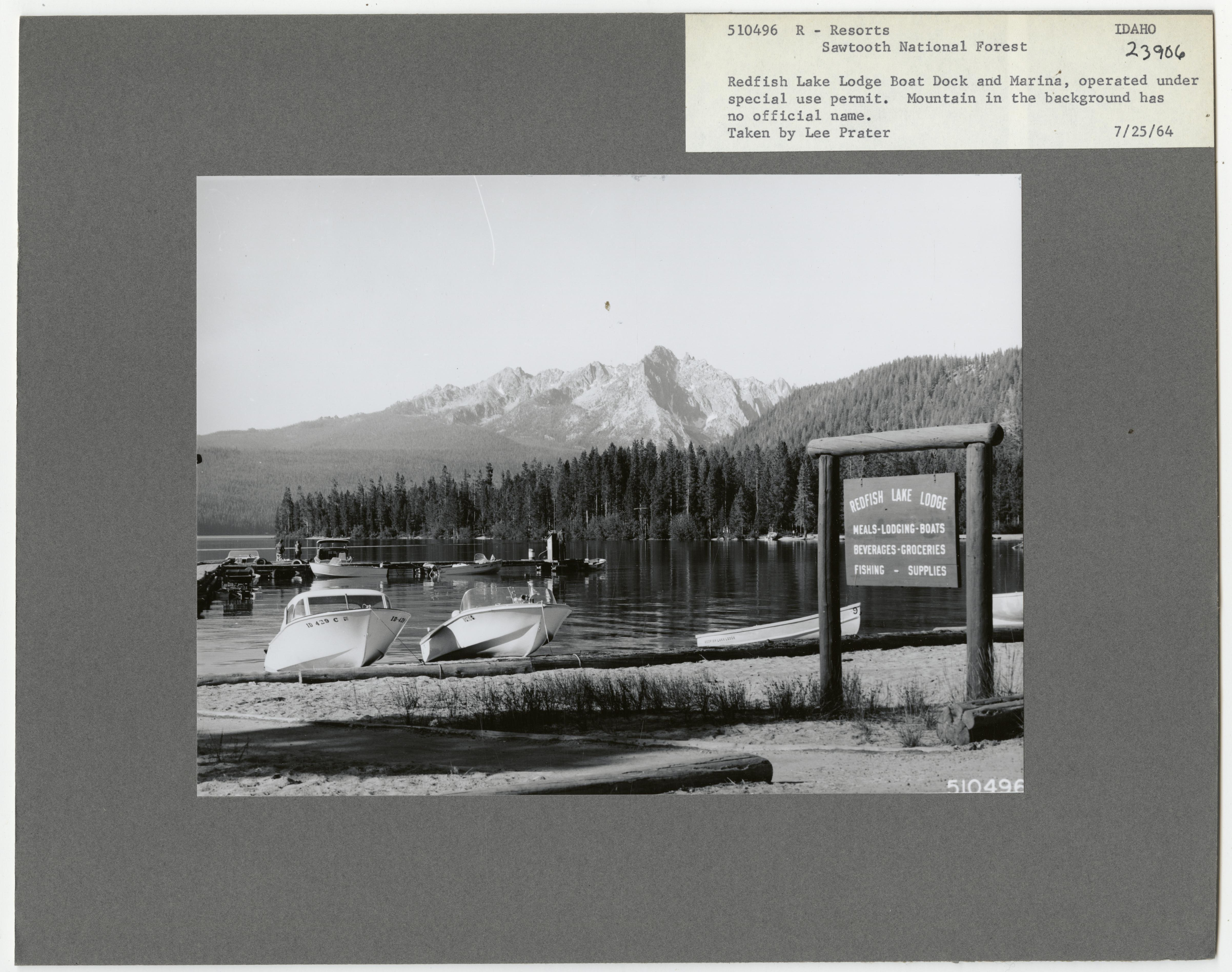
A photo of Redfish Lake near Stanley, Idaho in 1964, showing the dock and marina. Redfish Lake is still used for recreation today.

Residents and visitors participate in recreation; namely hiking, backpacking, mountain biking, white water rafting, and kayaking in the summer, and skiing, snowboarding, snowshoeing, and hot spring tourism in the winter. Hunting, fishing, trapping, and camping also occur in the area.

Ghost towns are an important marker of culture in Central Idaho. Bayhorse, Idaho is a ghost town located in Custer County. Originally opened as a gold mine, then converted into a silver mine, the town gradually became abandoned as silver prices fell. The city was placed on the National Register of Historic Places, and was purchased by the state for public enjoyment. Another ghost town, Shoup, Idaho, celebrates the mining history of the area through historical preservation of the gravity-fed gas pumps and general store, as well as other historical buildings in the area that once fed the mining town.

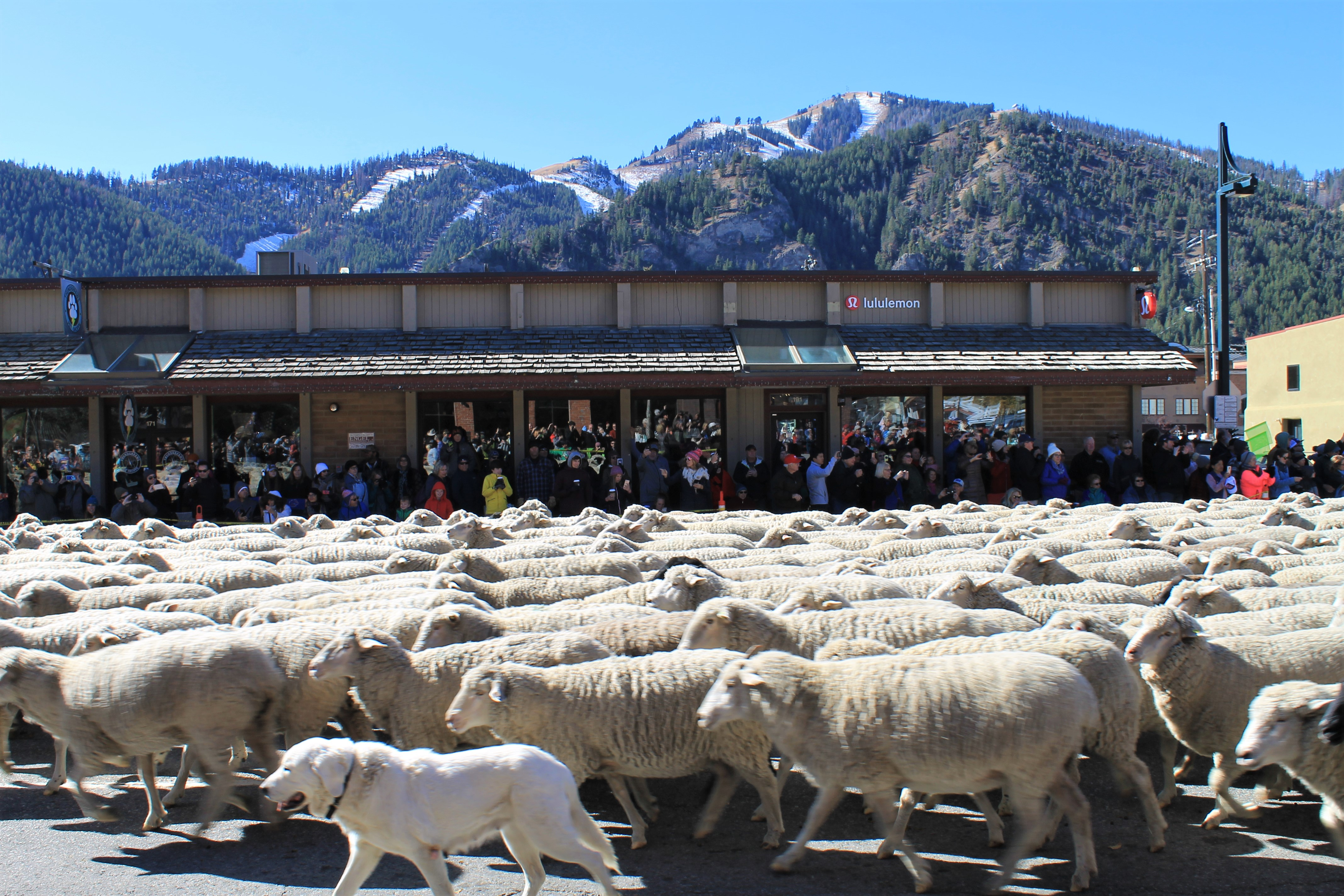
The Trailing of the Sheep Festival in downtown Ketchum in 2018.

The Trailing of the Sheep Festival in Ketchum, Idaho, started in 1996, celebrates the historical value of more than 150 years sheepherding as well as the rich culture that sheepherding immigrants brought to the area. At the festival activities include classes on cooking lamb, wool working, and stories of shepherding, as well as demonstrations of herding by dogs and shepherds through courses and a parade of sheep walking through downtown Ketchum.

The Sawtooth Salmon Festival, established in 2000, and held at the Stanley Museum in Stanley every August, commemorates the spawning of salmon in the Salmon River with live entertainment, educational tours and presentations, vendors, and food and drink.

The Sawtooth Festival, created in 2021, held in July, and also located in Stanley, aims to raise money and promote business and community through the selling of arts and crafts by artisans of Stanley and the Greater Central Idaho area. With more than 80 vendors, numerous photographers, painters, potters, jewelers, crocheters and macrame artists are present at the festival. Live music, as well as food and beverage are available as well.

== Cities ==
- Arco
- Bellevue
- Carey
- Challis
- Fairfield
- Hailey
- Ketchum
- Mackay
- Picabo
- Salmon
- Stanley
- Sun Valley

== See also ==
- Stibnite Mining District
