= Ruffneck Peak =

Mountain in Idaho, United States

- Location within Idaho Location within the United States

Highest point
- Elevation: 9,407 ft (2,867 m)
- Prominence: 1,594 ft (486 m)
- Coordinates: 44°28′54″N 115°09′18″W

Geography
- Location: Custer County, Idaho, U.S.
- Parent range: Salmon River Range
- Topo map(s): USGS Cape Horn Lakes, ID

Climbing
- Easiest route: Hike

Ruffneck Peak (9,407 feet (2,867 m)) is in the Salmon River Mountains in the U.S. state of Idaho. The peak is located in Salmon-Challis National Forests. A historic fire lookout is on top of Ruffneck Peak. Constructed in 1932, the fire lookout is staffed seasonally.
