= Chilly, Idaho =

Unincorporated community in the state of Idaho, United States

- Unincorporated community
- Location within Idaho Location within the United States
- Country: United States
- State: Idaho
- County: Custer
- Elevation: 6,316 ft (1,925 m)
- Time zone: UTC-7 (Mountain (MST))
  - Summer (DST): UTC-6 (MDT)
- ZIP code: 83235
- Area codes: 208, 986
- GNIS feature ID: 397321

Chilly is an unincorporated community in Custer County, Idaho.

== History ==
A post office called Chilly was established in 1902, and remained in operation until 1958. The community was so named on account of the often chilly air at the elevated town site.

Chilly's population was 107 in 1909, and was 92 in 1940.
