= Geology of Idaho =

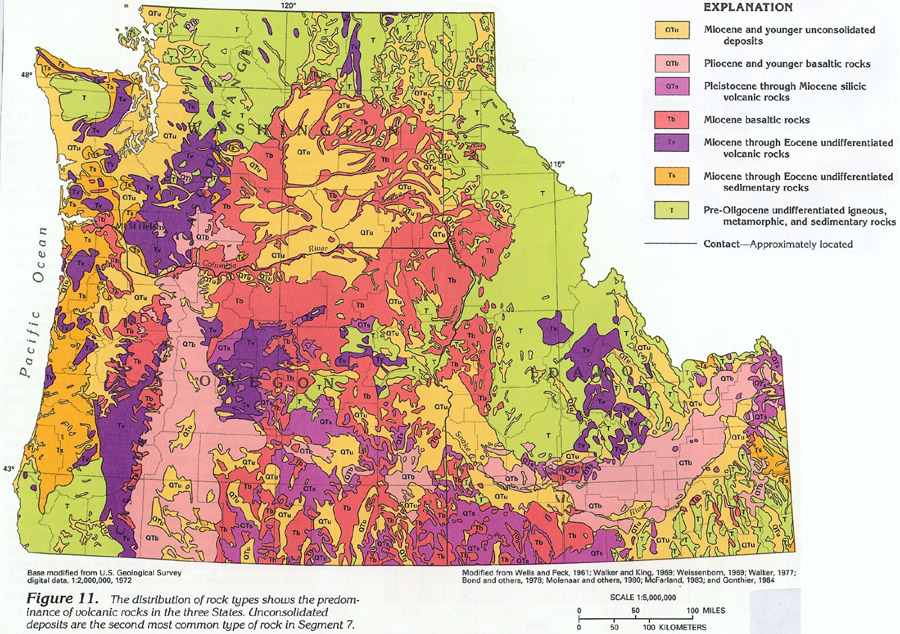
Geologic overview Washington, Oregon, and Idaho

The Geology of Idaho is complex, with outcroppings of differing ages of volcanics, undifferentiated metamorphics and sedimentary structures.

== Idaho Geologic Survey ==
Since 1919, the Idaho Geological Survey (formerly Bureau of Mines and Geology) has studied and reported on the general and environmental geology of the state. The Survey also studies and reports on the water (both surface and ground), mineral data, and energy assets of the state.

Geologists and hydrologists on staff at the Survey research, make reports based on their research, and produce maps for the state. The University of Idaho administers the Survey as a special program with offices in Moscow and in Boise.

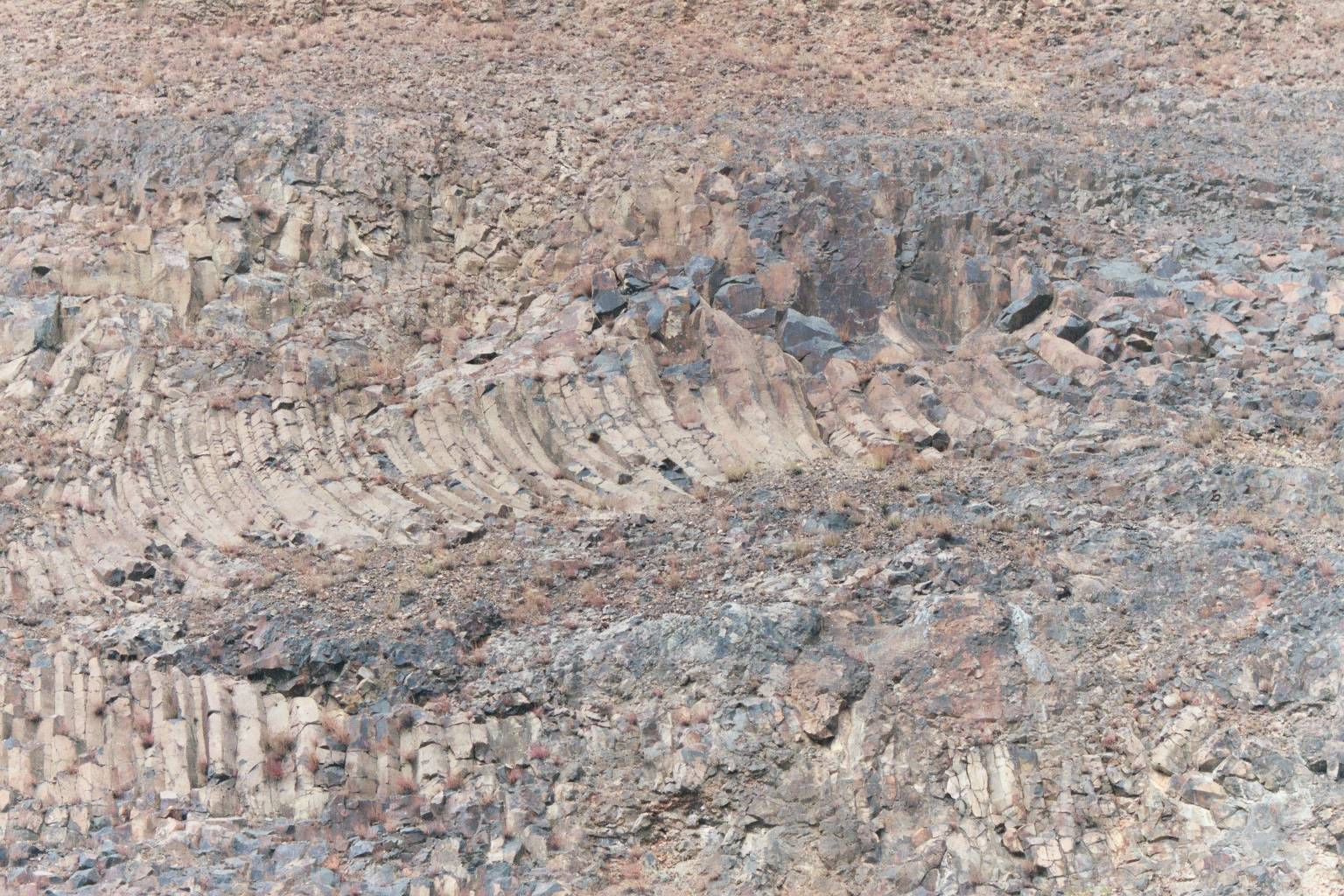
Basalt rock face at White Bird Pass (Idaho)

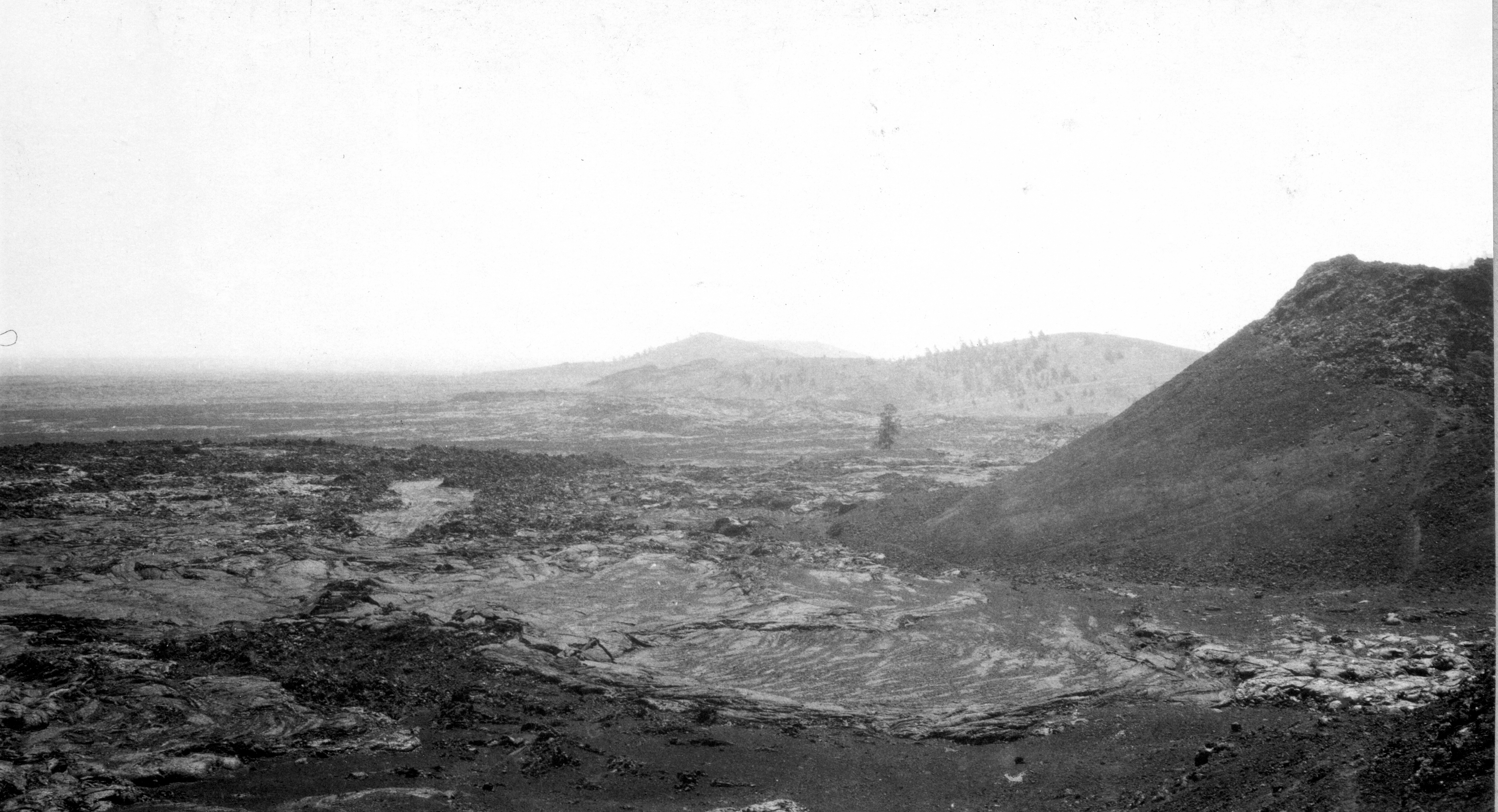
Basalt flow at Craters of the Moon National Monument

== Regions ==
=== Panhandle ===
The region of the Idaho Panhandle reaches from the Canada–US border south to Interstate Highway 90. The area consists generally of Precambrian sedimentary formations, some of which have metamorphosed into slates. The area includes the Selkirk Mountains, the Purcell trench and the Cabinet Mountains. Lead, silver and other ores are mined in the Coeur d’Alene Mining District.

=== Snake River Plain ===
The Grouse Creek block forms the central part of the south, extending over the state border to Nevada and Utah. It was formed over 2.5 billion years ago.

== See also ==
- Geology of the Pacific Northwest
