= Middle Fork Salmon River =

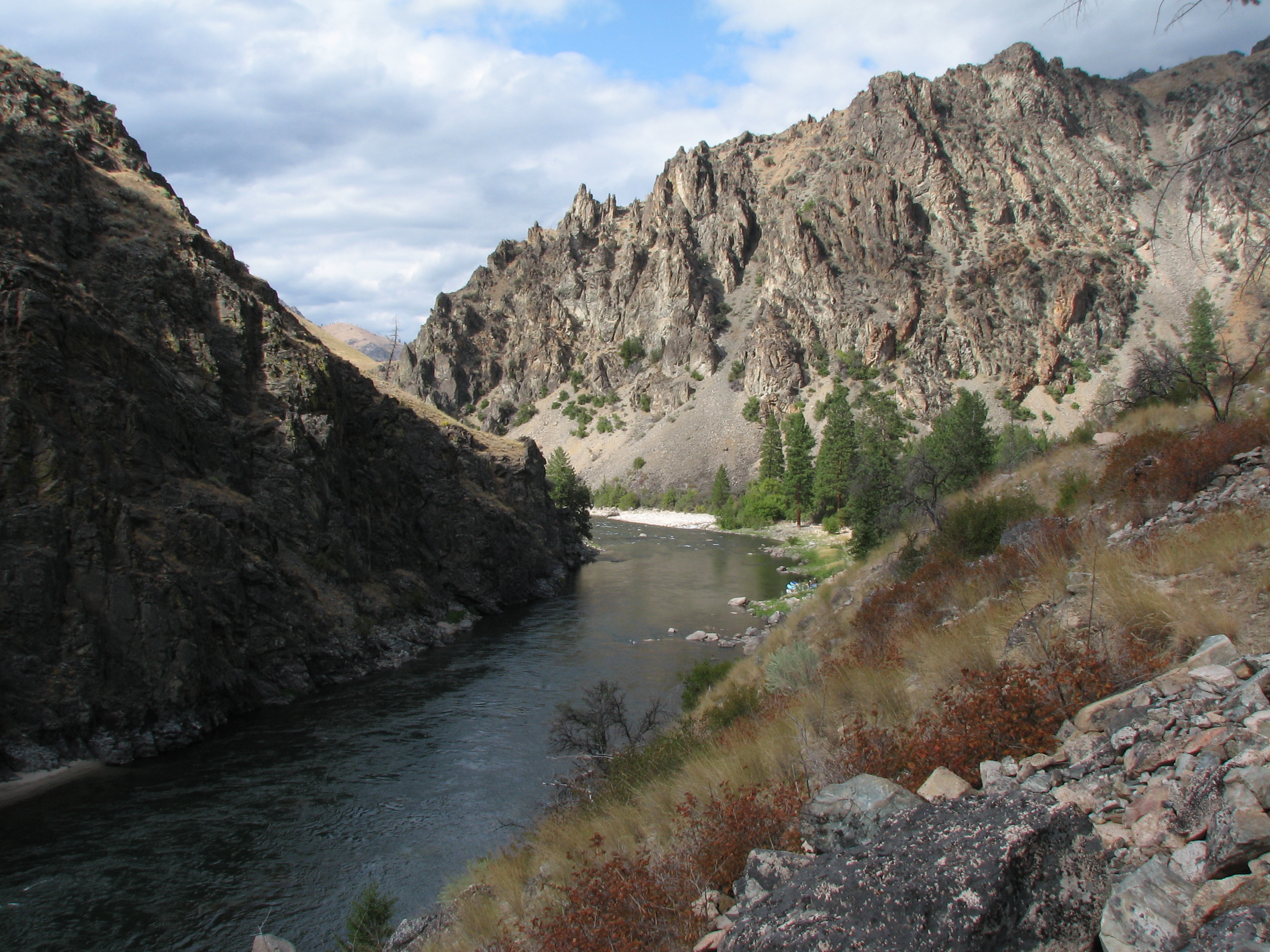
- Middle Fork Salmon River

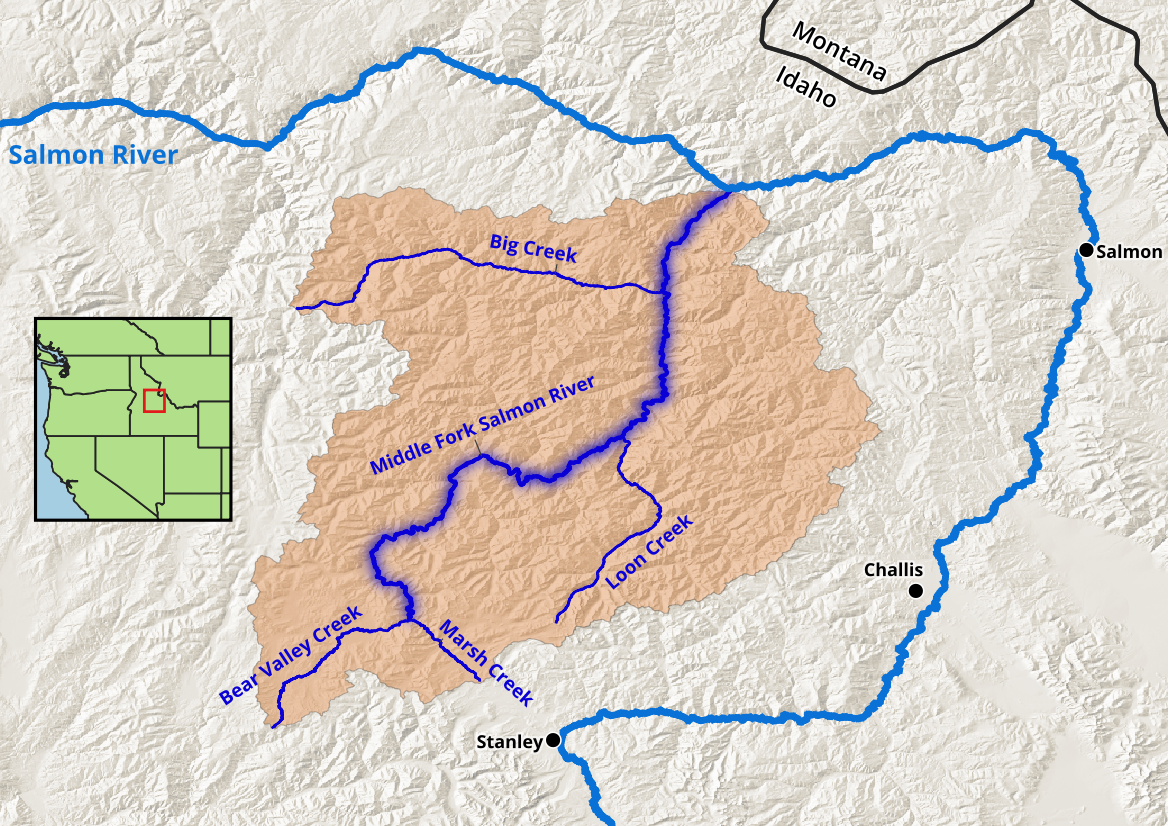
- Map of the Middle Fork Salmon River, its watershed boundary, and main tributaries.

- Location in the United States Location of the mouth in Idaho

Location
- Country: United States
- State: Idaho

Physical characteristics
- Source
  - coordinates: 44°26′57″N 115°13′51″W
- Mouth: Salmon River
  - coordinates: 45°17′50″N 114°35′36″W
  - elevation: 3,015 ft (919 m)

National Wild and Scenic River
- Type: Wild, Scenic
- Designated: October 2, 1968; 57 years ago

The Middle Fork of the Salmon River is a 104-mile-long (167 km) river in central Idaho in the northwestern United States. It is a tributary to the Salmon River, and lies in the center of the 2.5-million-acre (3,900 sq mi; 10,000 km^{2}) Frank Church-River of No Return Wilderness Area.

The Middle Fork is an exceptionally popular and difficult whitewater rafting and kayaking destination. Given Federal protection in 1980, the wilderness area it lies within is part of the largest roadless tract left in the lower 48 states.

== Course ==
The Middle Fork is a heavily whitewatered 104-mile-long (167 km) tributary of the Salmon River, the main tributary of the Snake River, which in turn is the main tributary to the Columbia River. The nearest town is Stanley to the southeast. The Middle Fork's elevation starts at 7,000 feet (2,100 m) above sea level and drops down to 3,015 feet (919 m)at its mouth. The 47-mile-long (76 km) Bear Valley Creek and Marsh Creek converge to form the Middle Fork. The Middle Fork has around a hundred tributaries; some of the larger are Rapid River, Loon Creek and Camas Creek, all from 20 to 25 miles (32 to 40 km) in length. The Middle Fork flows through 2,500 square miles (6,500 km^{2}) of rugged terrain known as the Salmon River Mountains, peaks of which reach 10,000 feet (3,000 m).

== Permit ==
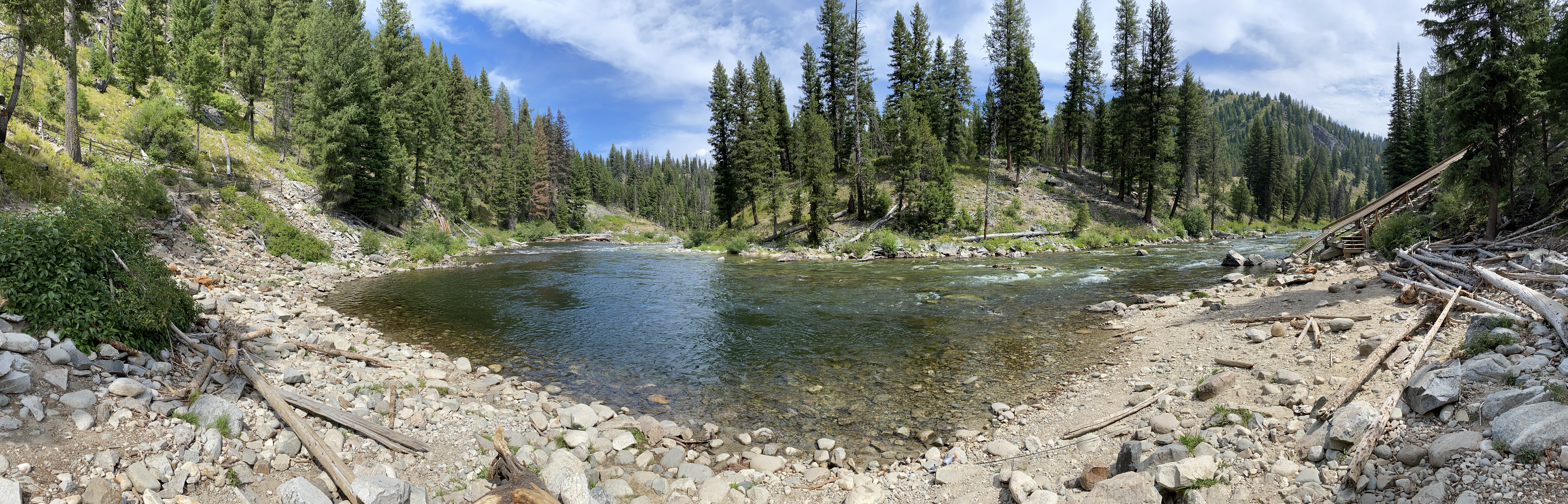
Boundary Creek Complex boat launch

A permit is required to travel down the Middle Fork of the Salmon River, which can be obtained through the Four Rivers Lottery and Permit Reservation System. The Middle Fork of the Salmon River permit season runs from May 28 - Sept. 3. Pre and the post season launches are first-come, first-served. Getting a recreational permit to float the Middle Fork is notoriously difficult and is awarded through a lottery system. There are a combined total of seven commercial and recreational launches a day. To become a permit holder you have to be 18 years old. The permit holder must work with a group to take care of the fees. The permit cannot be given to someone else, and the permit holder must be there at all times on the river. The permit holder must make sure that the rules, which are given by the United States Forest Service, are followed. An example would be that they must have a fire pan and some sort of portable human waste containment system (groover, WAG BAGs, etc.).

== Rapids ==
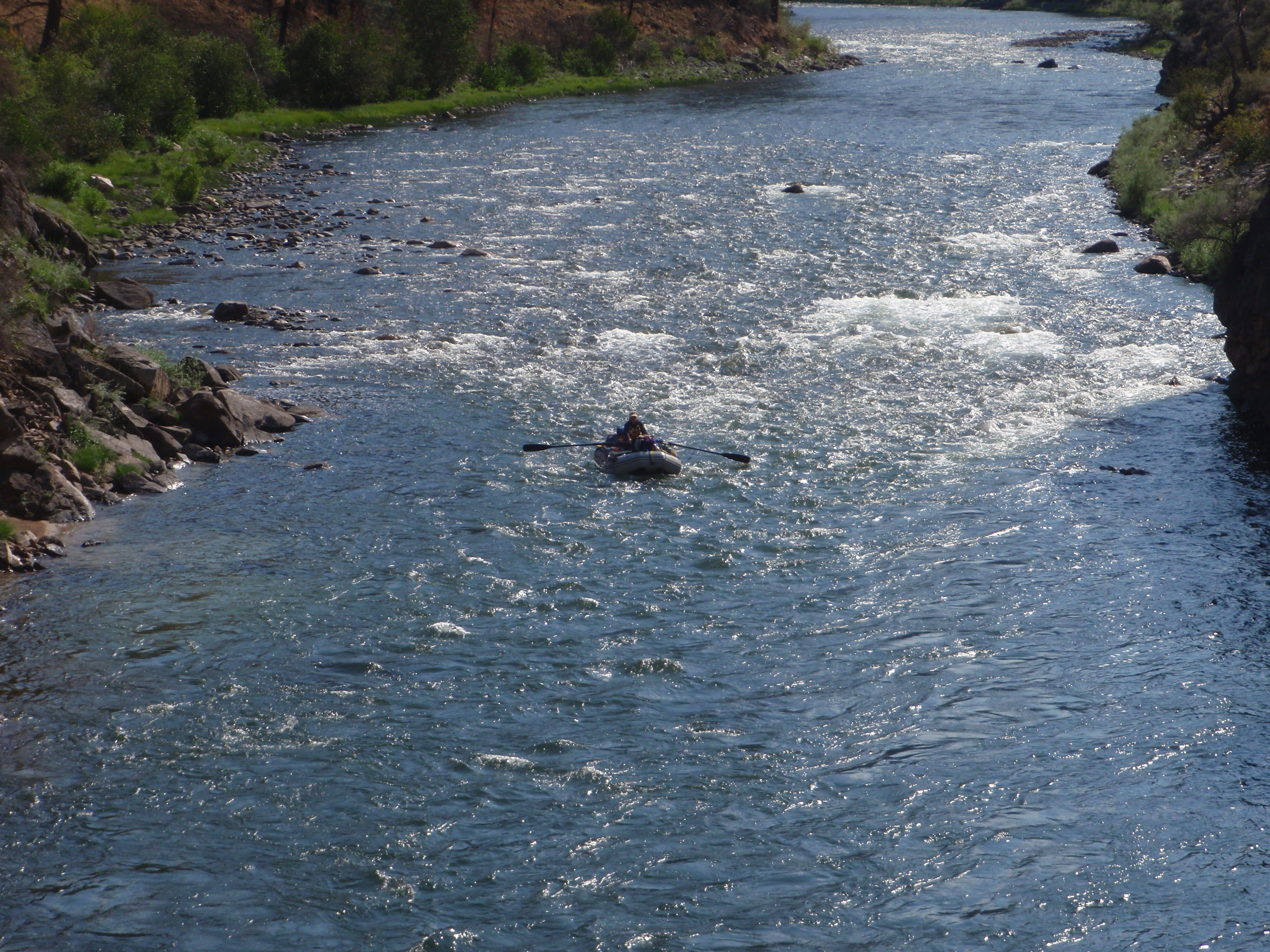
A raft in a Class II- riffle on the Middle Fork Salmon

The Middle Fork has three hundred raftable rapids. Some of the well-known rapids on the Middle Fork are Dagger Falls, Sulphur Slide, Velvet Falls, the Chutes, Power House, Pistol Creek, Tappan Falls, Red Side, Weber, Cliffside, Rubber, Hancock and Devil's Tooth. All but one of these are class III+ to class IV (on the scale of I to VI International scale of river difficulty classification system), with Dagger Falls being class V.

== Hot springs ==
The Middle Fork has six natural hot springs in the first 52 miles (84 km) of the river, Trail Flat, Sheepeater, Sunflower, Whitey Cox, Loon Creek and Hospital Bar. The hot springs vary in temperature and are all very popular places to stop on the river.

- Trail Flat hot springs is 30 yards (90 ft; 27 m) from the river and has one pool.
- Sheepeater hot springs is a half a mile from the river. There are three different pools which range from "super hot" to "just right".
- Sunflower hot springs has five pools. There is also a part of the hot spring that pours off the rocks and makes a shower.
- Whitey Cox's hot springs is up on a hill with large sandy-bottom pools, but as of at least 2004 has been infested with red spider mites and is not recommended for soaking.
- Loon Creek hot springs is a mile-and-a-half hike along Loon Creek from the Middle Fork. A wooden tub has been built with a nice view of Loon Creek.
- Hospital Bar is a small hot spring with two pools, one right next to the river.

== Presidential visit ==
During his second summer in office in 1978, President Jimmy Carter and his family vacationed in the West in the latter half of August, which began with a three-day, seventy-mile (110 km) float trip down the Middle Fork of the Salmon. Interior Secretary Cecil Andrus, the former (and future) governor of Idaho, was also in the party, joined by his family.

== List of local flora and fauna ==
=== Mammals ===
- Badger
- Bighorn sheep
- Bobcat
- Black bear
- Chipmunk
- Coyote
- Moose
- Mountain goat
- Mountain lion (cougar)
- Mule deer
- Muskrat
- Otter
- Porcupine
- Rocky Mountain elk
- Skunk
- Weasel
- Wolf

=== Vegetation ===
- Douglas fir
- Grand fir
- Subalpine fir
- Common juniper
- Rocky Mountain juniper
- Western larch
- Mountain mahogany
- Limber pine
- Lodgepole pine
- Ponderosa pine
- Engelmann spruce
- Birch
- Bitter bush
- Black cottonwood
- Blue elderberry
- Bracken fern
- Dwarf Oregon grape
- Hawthorn
- Little wood rose
- Mock orange
- Nine bark
- Quaking aspen
- Rabbit brush
- Red osier dog wood
- Rocky Mountain maple
- Sagebrush
- Service berry
- Snow berry
- Snow brush
- Thimble berry
- Wax currant
- White alder
- Willows

=== Fish ===
- Cutthroat trout
- Rainbow trout, includes steelhead
- Mountain whitefish
- Bull trout
- Chinook salmon

=== Birds ===
- Killdeer
- Osprey
- Belted kingfisher
- Common merganser
- American dipper
- Cliff swallow
- Red tailed hawk
- Bald eagle
- Golden eagle
- Blue grouse
- Ruffed grouse
- Chukar
- Magpie
- Mourning dove
- Great horned owl

== See also ==
- List of rivers of Idaho
- List of longest streams of Idaho
- List of National Wild and Scenic Rivers

== Notes ==
- Midmore, Joe. Middle Fork History. Harrah's Club Inc. Lake Tahoe, NV, 1970.
- Quinn, James M. Quinn, James W. Quinn, Terry L. and king James G. Handbook to the Middle Fork of the Salmon River Canyon. Commercial Printing Company Medford, OR, 1981.
- Sierra Club. International Whitewater Rating Systems. 2003
- USDA Forest Service. The Middle Fork of the Salmon River. January 8, 2008
