= Salmon River Mountains =

Mountain range in Idaho, United States

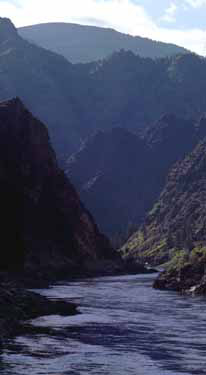

Highest point
- Peak: White Mountain
- Elevation: 10,442 ft (3,183 m)
- Coordinates: 44°34′29″N 114°29′45″W

Dimensions
- Length: 106 mi (171 km) North-south
- Width: 122 mi (196 km) East-west
- Area: 8,900 mi^{2} (23,000 km^{2})

Geography
- Location within the United States Location within Idaho
- Country: United States
- State: Idaho

The Salmon River Mountains are a major mountain range in the western United States, covering most of the central part of Idaho. The range exceeds 120 miles (190 km) in length and its boundaries are usually defined by the Salmon River and its large tributary forks. Part of the central Rocky Mountains, the entire range lies west of the continental divide and drains to the Snake River. The highest peak is White Mountain, at 10,442 feet (3,183 m) above sea level; five peaks have summits exceeding 10,000 feet (3,050 m), and the three major subranges are defined by other forks of the Salmon River: the West, Central, and East Salmon River Mountains.

The mountains are an extensive block-shaped massif in central Idaho, with their western boundary defined by the Little Salmon River and the northern and eastern boundary marked by the main stem Salmon. It is a block-shaped region 102 miles (164 km) north-south and 122 miles (196 km) east-west, covering nearly 8,900 square miles (23,000 km^{2}). The West Salmon River Mountains lie between the Little and South Forks of the Salmon, the Central range is between the South and Middle Forks, and the East range is defined by the mountains east of the Middle Fork. Although the northwestern corner of the range is only about thirty miles (50 km) southeast of the river port of Lewiston, the Salmon River Mountains occupy one of the remotest areas in the contiguous United States.

The southeastern portion of the range is bounded by the White Knob, Pioneer, and Boulder Mountains, and the basins of Marsh Creek, Valley Creek, and Warm Spring Creek. The southwestern boundaries are formed by forks of the Payette River, also a Snake River tributary. The height of the mountains gradually increases from west to east, sloping up towards the continental divide along the border with Montana. The ten highest peaks are all in the eastern subrange, while the highest peak in the central mountains is Big Baldy, at 9,705 feet (2,958 m). The highest mountain in the western subrange is North Loon Mountain, at 9,322 feet (2,841 m).
