= Pioneer Mountain =

Pioneer Mountain may refer to:

- Pioneer Mountain (Arizona) in Arizona, USA
- Pioneer Mountain (California) in California, USA
- Pioneer Mountain (Idaho) in Idaho, USA
- Pioneer Mountain (Montana) in Montana, USA
- Pioneer Mountain (Oregon) in Oregon, USA, near Toledo, Oregon; 44.670396°N 123.8820573°W

See also: Pioneer Mountains (disambiguation)
