= Pyramid Peak (Custer County, Idaho) =

Mountain in Idaho, United States

- Location within Idaho

Highest point
- Elevation: 11,628 ft (3,544 m)
- Prominence: 388 ft (118 m)
- Coordinates: 43°47′47″N 113°59′29″W

Geography
- Location: Custer County, Idaho, U.S.
- Parent range: Pioneer Mountains
- Topo map: USGS Copper Basin

Climbing
- Easiest route: Simple scramble, class 2

Pyramid Peak, at 11,628 feet (3,544 m) above sea level is the 13th highest peak in the Pioneer Mountains of Idaho. The peak is located in Salmon-Challis National Forest and Custer County. It is the 36th highest peak in Idaho and about 0.85 mi (1.37 km) northeast of Altair Peak.
