= Pegasus Peak =

Mountain in Idaho, United States

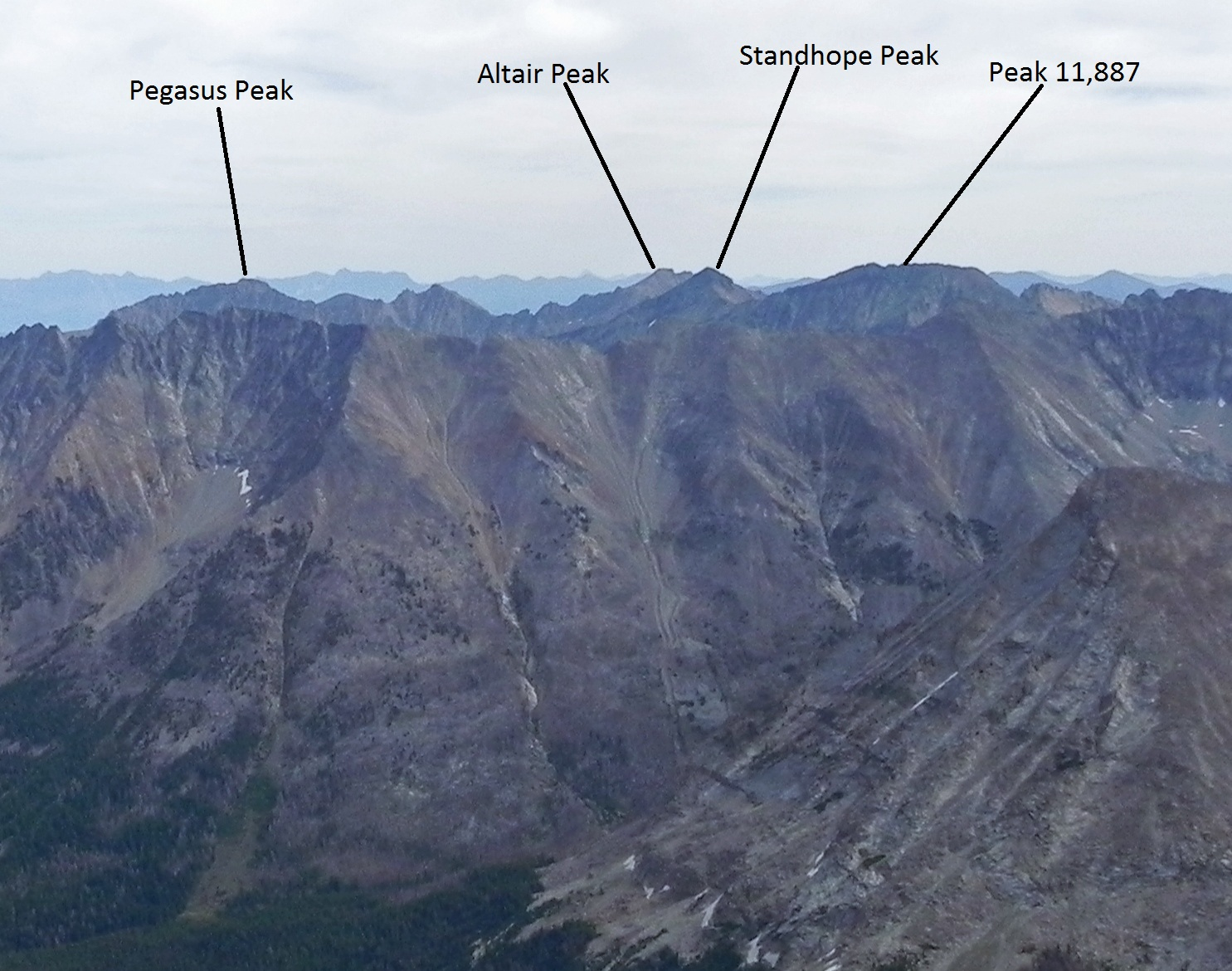
- Pegasus Peak viewed from Hyndman Peak

Highest point
- Elevation: 11,736 ft (3,577 m)
- Prominence: 616 ft (188 m)
- Coordinates: 43°48′44″N 114°00′44″W

Geography
- Location within Idaho
- Location: Custer County, Idaho, U.S.
- Parent range: Pioneer Mountains
- Topo map: USGS Standhope Peak

Climbing
- Easiest route: Scramble, class 3

Pegasus Peak, at 11,736 feet (3,577 m) above sea level is the tenth highest peak in the Pioneer Mountains of Idaho. The peak is located in Salmon-Challis National Forest and Custer County. It is the 29th highest peak in Idaho and about 1.4 mi (2.3 km) north of Altair Peak.
