= Blizzard Mountain Ski Area =

Ski area in Idaho, United States

- Location within the United States Location within Idaho
- Location: Blizzard Mountain Road; Butte County, Idaho, U.S.
- Nearest city: Arco - 18 miles (30 km); Carey - 28 miles (45 km)
- Coordinates: 43.508°N 113.560°W
- Vertical: 710 ft (216 m)
- Top elevation: 6,305 ft (1,922 m)
- Base elevation: 5,595 ft (1,705 m)
- Trails: beginner; intermediate
- Lift system: 1 platter lift
- Snowmaking: no
- Night skiing: no

Blizzard Mountain Ski Area is a modest ski area in the western United States, in central Idaho. It is located in the southern tip of the Pioneer Mountains in southwestern Butte County, 18 miles (30 km) southwest of Arco. The elevation of its lift-served summit is 6,305 feet (1,922 m) above sea level, with a vertical drop of 710 feet (216 m) on a treeless, northeast-facing slope. The summit offers a sweeping view of the vast Snake River Plain to the east, south, and west.

There is one platter lift, and the area operates on Saturdays, conditions permitting.

The community-run ski hill is just north of the Craters of the Moon National Monument, about four miles (6 km) north of the visitor center. The base area is six miles (10 km) east of the summit of Blizzard Mountain, which rises to 9,313 feet (2,839 m) at the border with Blaine County.
