= Salzburger Spitzl =

Mountain in Idaho, United States

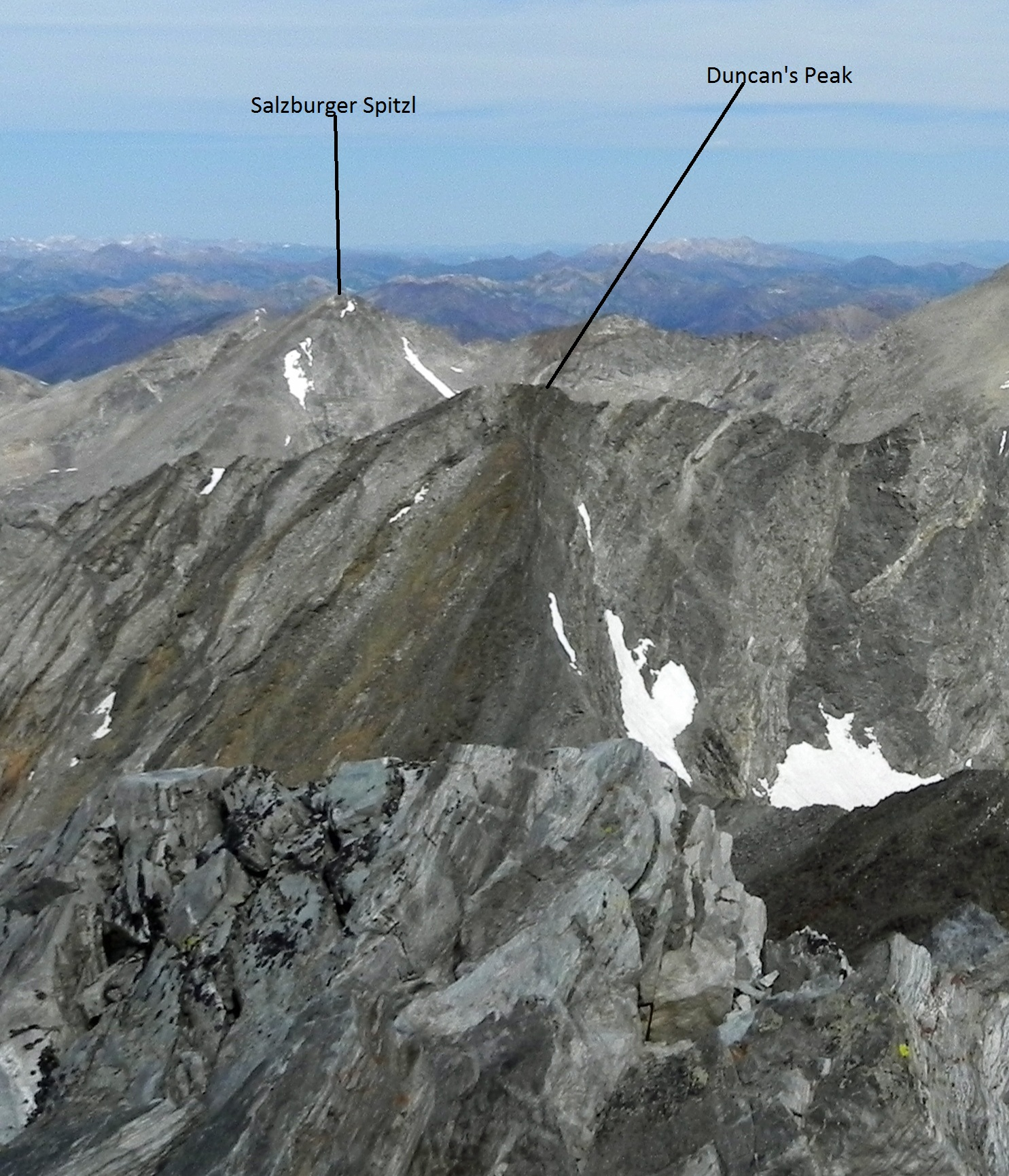
- Salzburger Spitzl viewed from Hyndman Peak

Highest point
- Elevation: 11,600 ft (3,500 m)
- Prominence: 320 ft (98 m)
- Coordinates: 43°46′28″N 114°09′33″W

Geography
- Location within Idaho
- Location: Blaine and Custer counties, Idaho, U.S.
- Parent range: Pioneer Mountains
- Topo map: USGS Phi Kappa Mountain

Climbing
- Easiest route: Simple scramble, class 2

Salzburger Spitzl, at 11,600 feet (3,500 m) above sea level is the 14th highest peak in the Pioneer Mountains of Idaho. The peak is located on the border of Sawtooth and Salmon-Challis National Forests as well as Blaine and Custer counties. It is the 40th highest peak in Idaho and less than 0.9 mi (1.4 km) west of Goat Mountain.
