= Cobb Peak =

Cobb Peak can refer to two mountains in the United States:

- Cobb Peak (Idaho) in Blaine County
- Cobb Peak (Utah) in Tooele County, Utah
