= Duncan's Peak =

Mountain in Idaho, United States

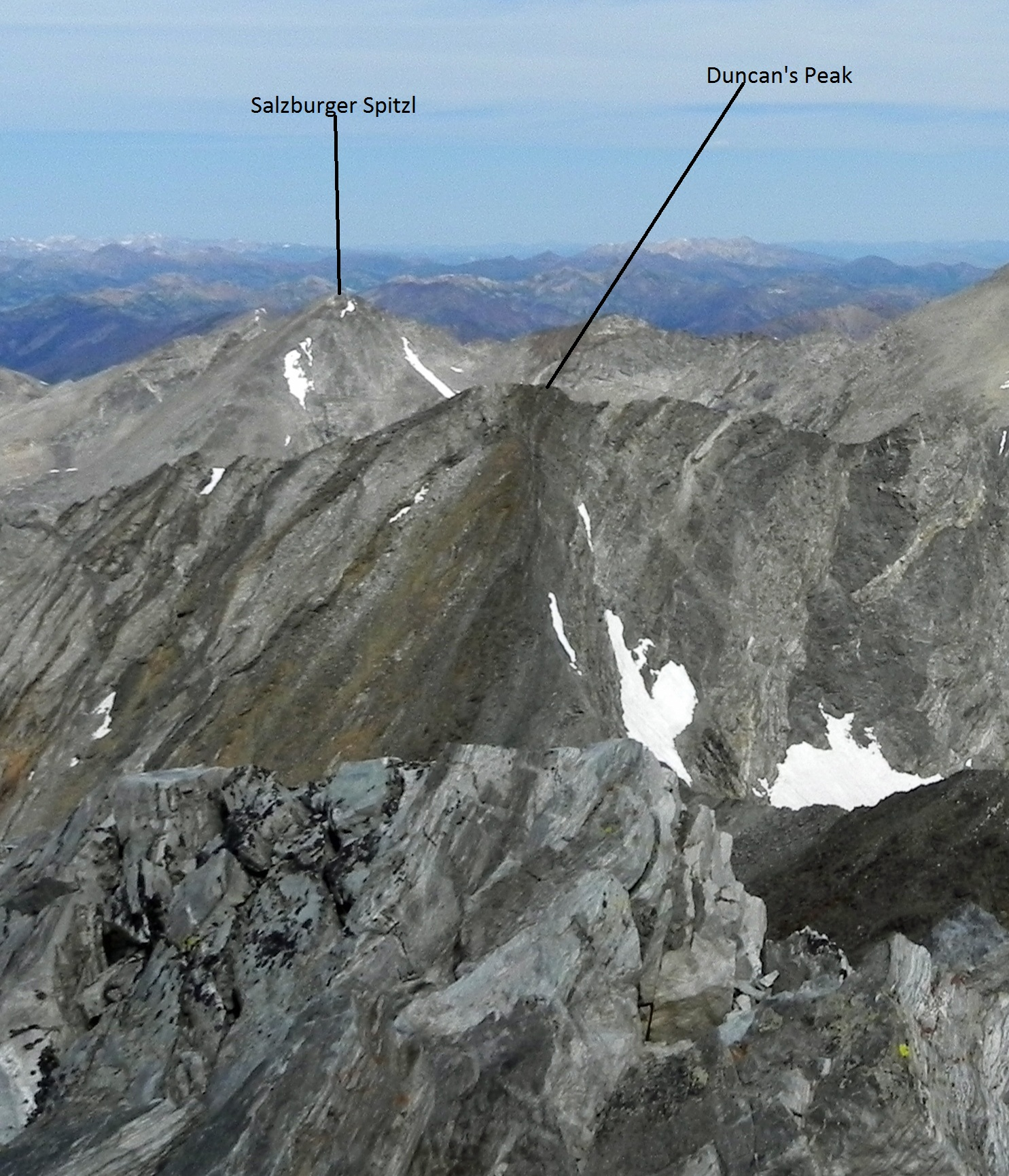
- Duncan's Peak viewed from Hyndman Peak

Highest point
- Elevation: 11,755 ft (3,583 m)
- Prominence: 395 ft (120 m)
- Coordinates: 43°45′22″N 114°08′16″W

Geography
- Location within Idaho
- Location: Blaine and Custer counties, Idaho, U.S.
- Parent range: Pioneer Mountains
- Topo map: USGS Phi Kappa Mountain

Climbing
- Easiest route: Scramble, class 3

Duncan's Peak, at 11,755 feet (3,583 m) above sea level, is the ninth-highest peak in the Pioneer Mountains of the U.S. state of Idaho. The peak is located on the border of Sawtooth and Salmon-Challis National Forests as well as Blaine and Custer counties. It is the 28th-highest peak in Idaho and about 0.6 miles (0.97 km) northwest of Hyndman Peak.
