= Devils Bedstead East =

Mountain in Idaho, United States

Devil's Bedstead East
- Location within Idaho

Highest point
- Elevation: 11,865 ft (3,616 m)
- Prominence: 825 ft (251 m)
- Coordinates: 43°46′27″N 114°08′31″W

Geography
- Location: Custer County, Idaho, U.S.
- Parent range: Pioneer Mountains
- Topo map: USGS Phi Kappa Mountain

Climbing
- Easiest route: Scramble, class 3

Devil's Bedstead East, at 11,865 feet (3,616 m) above sea level is the fifth-highest peak in the Pioneer Mountains of the U.S. state of Idaho. The peak is located Salmon-Challis National Forest in Custer County about 1.5 miles (2.4 kilometers) north of the Blaine County border and 1.75 miles (2.82 kilometers) north-northeast of Goat Mountain. It is the 21st-highest peak in Idaho.
