= Cosplay Complex =

Japanese anime series

- Cover art from the Cosplay Complex DVD release

こすぷれCOMPLEX (Kosupure Complex)
- Genre: Comedy
- Original video animation
- Directed by: Shinichiro Kimura
- Written by: Noboru Kimura
- Music by: Yoshinobu Hiraiwa
- Studio: TNK
- Released: 25 May 2002 – 26 October 2002
- Runtime: 29 minutes
- Episodes: 3
- Original video animation

Cosplay Complex: Extra Identification
- Directed by: Shinichiro Kimura
- Studio: TNK
- Released: 3 July 2004
- Runtime: 5 minutes

Cosplay Complex (こすぷれCOMPLEX) is a Japanese original video animation (OVA) series directed by Shinichiro Kimura and animated by TNK. It is centered on the after school cosplay club at East Oizumi Academy and follows the girls in the club as they practice so that one day they may be able to compete in cosplay competitions.

== Characters ==
=== East Oizumi Cosplay Club ===
Chako Hasegawa (長谷川チャコ, Hasegawa Chako)
Voiced by: Sakura Nogawa (Japanese); Larissa Wolcott (English)
Chako, a primary character of the anime, is a pink haired girl who is cheerful although clumsy. She joins the cosplay club which is lacking official members. She has an overly bubbly outlook and spawns catchphrases, such as "Have a Chako-riffic day".

Delmo (デルモ, Derumo)
Voiced by: Rie Kugimiya (Japanese); Samantha Inoue-Harte (English)
A small magical bunnygirl, Delmo is able to conjure up cosplay costumes as well as alter the girls' bodies to fit them. This includes enlarging their breasts.

Maria Imai (今井まりあ, Imai Maria)
Voiced by: Saeko Chiba (Japanese); Carla Witt (English)
Maria is a dark haired bespectacled girl. A miko, she is one of the original members of the club. She is very protective of her little sister, especially from Jenny.

Athena Imai (今井あてな, Imai Athena)
Voiced by: Ai Shimizu (Japanese); Tiger Darrow (English)
Maria's little sister, she is too young to attend the academy but is a part of the cosplay club nonetheless. She is the object of Jenny's sexual desires, though Maria often has a fainting spell whenever the two interact.

Reika Aoshima (青島麗華, Aoshima Reika)
Voiced by: Chiaki Takahashi (Japanese); Jenny Larson (English)
Reika is stubborn compared to the other cosplayers, sometimes appearing to be unfriendly towards them. She is the leader of the crew and is often exasperated by their inability to focus on their cosplay goals.

Jenny Matel (ジェニー・マテル, Jenī Materu)
Voiced by: Akeno Watanabe (Japanese); Jenny Smolins (English)
Jenny is a foreign exchange student from Italy, though is featured as a stereotypical large-chested and blonde American. She also has a Lolita Complex and is attracted to Athena.

Gorō Yorozuyo (万代五郎, Yorozuyo Gorō)
Voiced by: Susumu Chiba (Japanese); Corey Gagne (English)
President and only male member of the cosplay club. He has a tendency to over-act, but is the most skilled cosplayer in the group. He is the only one who knows that Reika wears glasses and has a large crush on her. He has a tendency to read dirty stories aloud, often leading to some awkward character interaction between Reika and himself or another female.

Ikebukuro (イケブクロウ, Ikebukurou)
Voiced by: Kenichi Ono (Japanese); Arthur Tilotson (English)
A small owl-like creature who is Delmo's friend and assistant. Helps sewing, ironing and helping Chako and Delmo with costumes and usually acts as a judge for cosplay competitions, despite his inability to speak (though everyone understands him just fine).

Coach Kuroba (黒葉コーチ, Kuroba kōchi)
Voiced by: Kenji Nomura (Japanese); Donatello Kalat (English)
The teacher sponsor of the Cosplay Club. His frequent hospitalization is a running gag.

=== Other characters ===
Kōsuke Tamiya (田宮耕介, Tamiya Kōsuke)
Voiced by: Takahiro Sakurai (Japanese); John Minnich (English)
A male college student who enjoys photography. Chako's main love interest.

Sachiko Arii (有井幸子, Arii Sachiko)
Voiced by: Yuki Masuda (Japanese); Peyton Hayslip (English)

=== Shin-Takarazuka Academy Cosplay Club ===
Ranko Takara (鷹良蘭子, Takara Ranko)
Voiced by: Kikuko Inoue (Japanese); Kimberly Dilts (English)
The head of the Shin-Takarazuka Academy Cosplay Club, the World Series champions. She is an extremely talented cosplayer, able to modify the bodies of herself and others as well as inject the characters she plays with personality. She is Tsukasa's boss and Kazuke's girlfriend. She is very hard on Tsukasa but sincerely believes in her talent as a cosplayer.

Tsukasa Tomii (富井つかさ, Tomii Tsukasa)
Voiced by: Masumi Asano (Japanese); Camille Chen (English)
A member of the Shin-Takarazuka Cosplay Club, an expert seamstress, and Ranko's assistant. She is very shy and reluctant to participate in cosplay contests. However, she overcomes her fear with the help of Chako and Ranko.

Jilmo (ジルモ, Jirumo)
Voiced by: Yukiko Hirotsu

Blue-haired woman
A woman who is first seen leaving purple roses at the grave of Sachiko's late husband. Sachiko is later shocked to see her in the audience at the cosplay battle between Chako and Ranko. On the third and final episode it is revealed that she was the limousine driver for the Shin – Takarazuka Cosplay Club.

== Episode list ==
No.	Title	Original release date
1	"The Birth of the Cosplay Club"; Transliteration: "Cosplay-bu Tanjou!" (Japanese: コスプレ部誕生!)	25 May 2002
2	"Summer Training Camp of Charm!"; Transliteration: "Miwaku no Natsu Gasshuku" (Japanese: 魅惑の夏合宿)	25 July 2002
3	"The Final Battle: Showdown in the East Oizumi Academy Gym!"; Transliteration: "Kessen! Ooizumihigashi Gakuen Taiikukan wa Akaku Moete Iru!" (Japanese: 決戦! 大泉東学園体育館は赤く萌えている!)	25 October 2002
OVA	"Extra Identification 101"	1 June 2004
