= Dilts =

Dilts is a surname. Notable people with the surname include:

- Bucky Dilts (born 1953), American football player
- Kimberly Dilts (fl. early 21st century), American actress and filmmaker
- Stephen Dilts (fl. 2002–2010), Commissioner of the New Jersey Department of Transportation
