= Brocky Peak =

Mountain in Idaho, United States

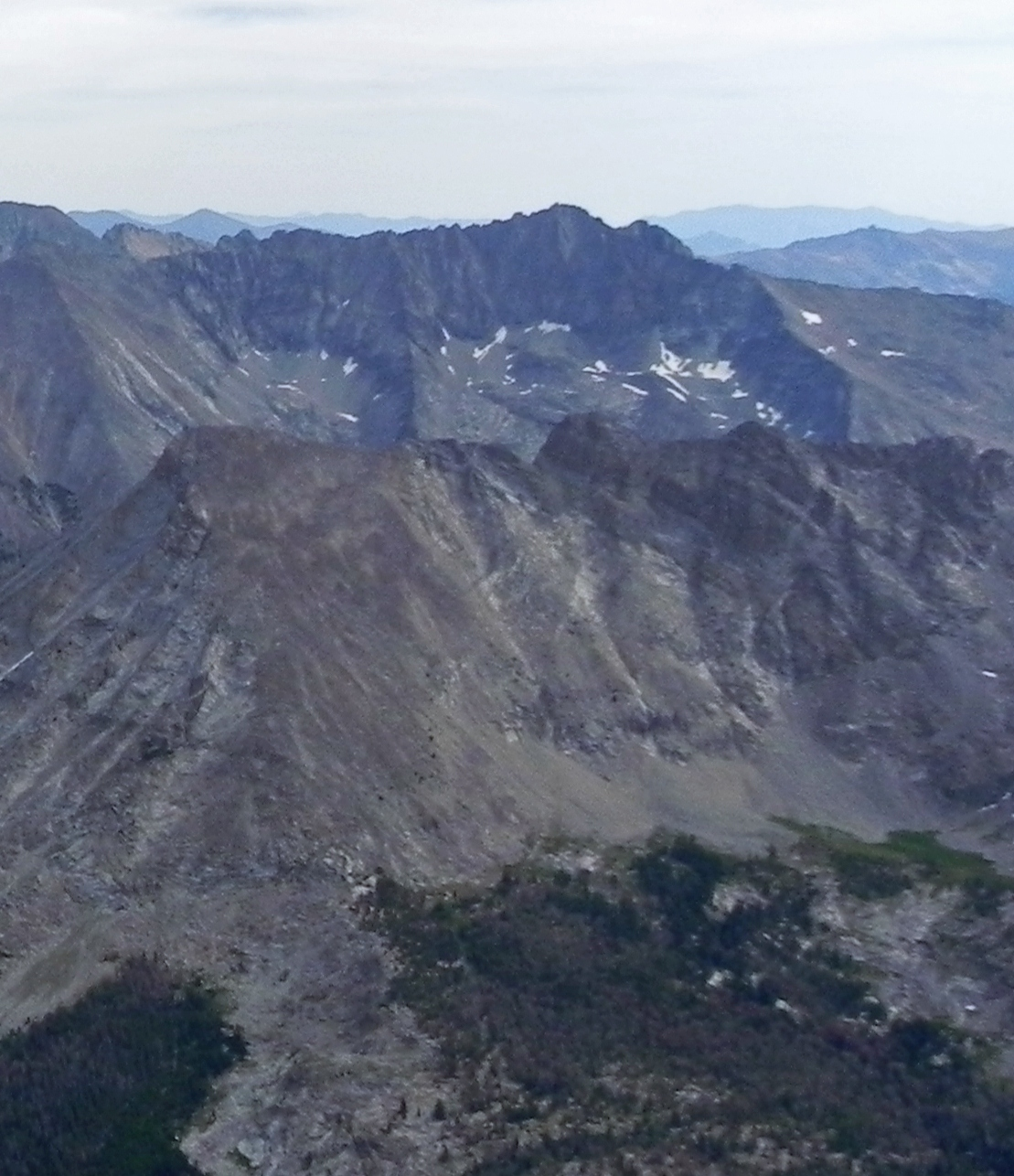
- Brocky Peak viewed from Hyndman Peak

Highest point
- Elevation: 11,839 ft (3,609 m)
- Prominence: 759 ft (231 m)
- Coordinates: 43°45′25″N 114°03′07″W

Geography
- Location within Idaho
- Location: Blaine and Custer counties, Idaho, U.S.
- Parent range: Pioneer Mountains
- Topo map: USGS Standhope Peak

Climbing
- Easiest route: Scramble, class 3

Brocky Peak, at 11,839 feet (3,609 m) above sea level, is the sixth highest peak in the Pioneer Mountains of Idaho. The peak is located on the border of Sawtooth National Forest and Salmon-Challis Forest, as well as Blaine and Custer counties. It is the 23rd highest peak in Idaho.
