= Pioneer Mountains =

Pioneer Mountains may refer to:

- Pioneer Mountains (Idaho)
- Pioneer Mountains (Montana)
