= Blizzard Mountain =

Mountain in the state of Idaho

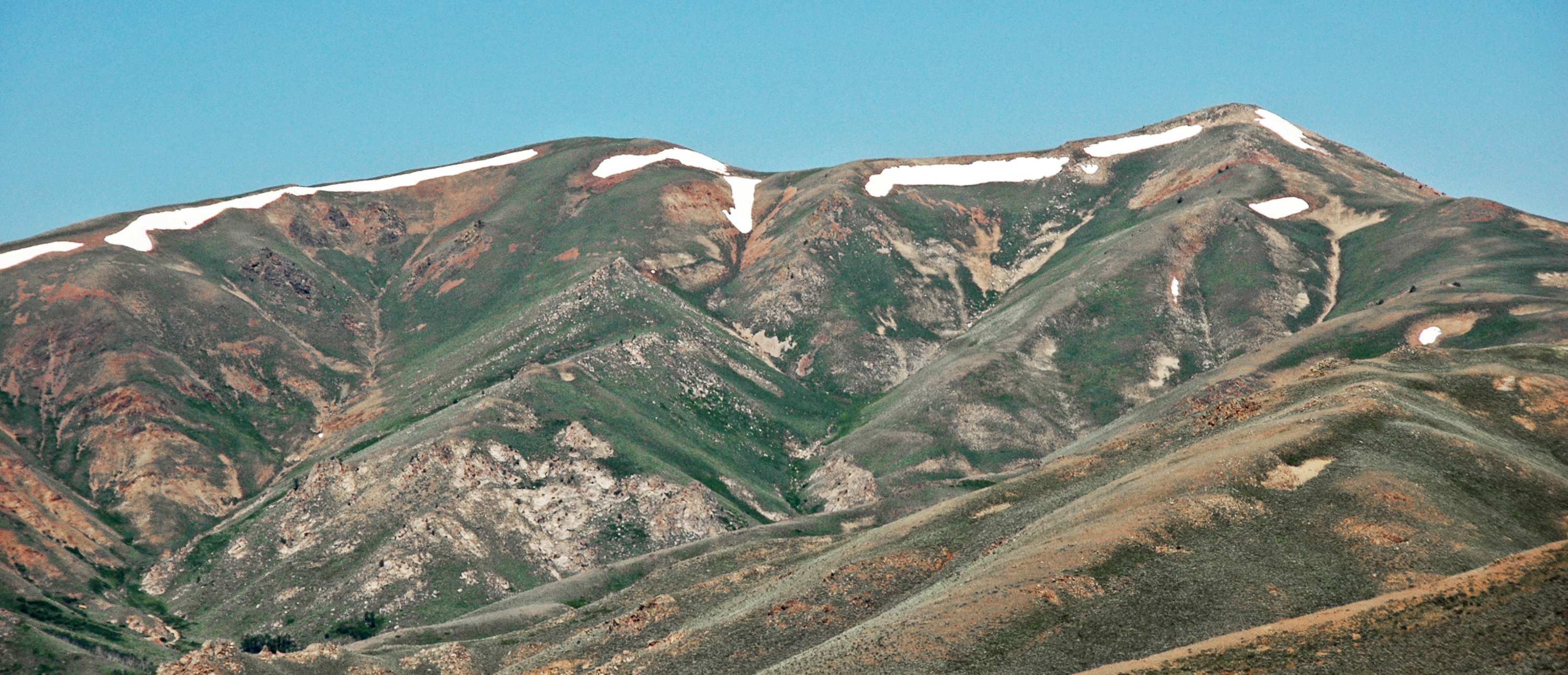
- Southeast aspect in July 2011

Highest point
- Elevation: 9,313 ft (2,839 m)
- Prominence: 1,933 ft (589 m)
- Parent peak: Peak 9364
- Isolation: 9.27 mi (14.92 km)
- Coordinates: 43°29′53″N 113°40′06″W

Geography
- Location within the United States Location within Idaho
- Country: United States
- State: Idaho
- County: Blaine / Butte
- Parent range: Pioneer Mountains; Rocky Mountains
- Topo map: USGS Blizzard Mountain South

Geology
- Rock age: Mississippian
- Mountain type: Fault block
- Rock type: Sedimentary rock

Climbing
- Easiest route: class 2 hiking

Blizzard Mountain is a 9,313-foot elevation (2,839 m) mountain summit in the western United States, located in central Idaho on the border of Blaine and Butte counties.

== Description ==
Blizzard Mountain is part of the Pioneer Mountains, a subset of the Rocky Mountains. The mountain is northwest of Craters of the Moon National Monument and Preserve, 24 miles (39 km) southwest of the town of Arco, and can be viewed from U.S. Route 20.

The Blizzard Mountain Ski Area is six miles (10 km) east of the summit. Topographic relief is significant as the summit rises 3,300 feet (1,000 meters) above Cottonwood Creek and the Snake River Plain in three miles. This landform's toponym has been officially adopted by the United States Board on Geographic Names.

== Gallery ==
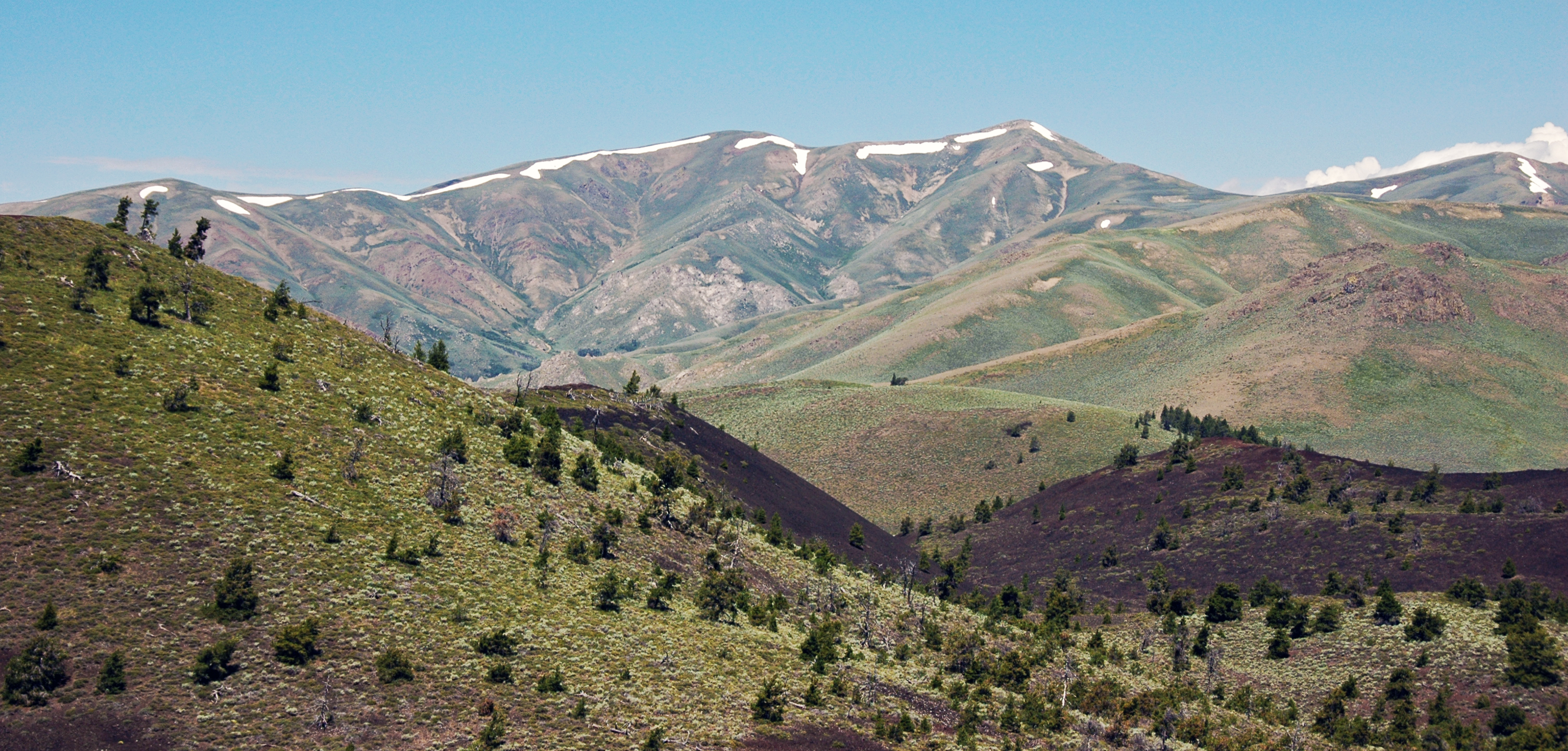
Blizzard Mountain beyond lava field of Craters of the Moon National Monument

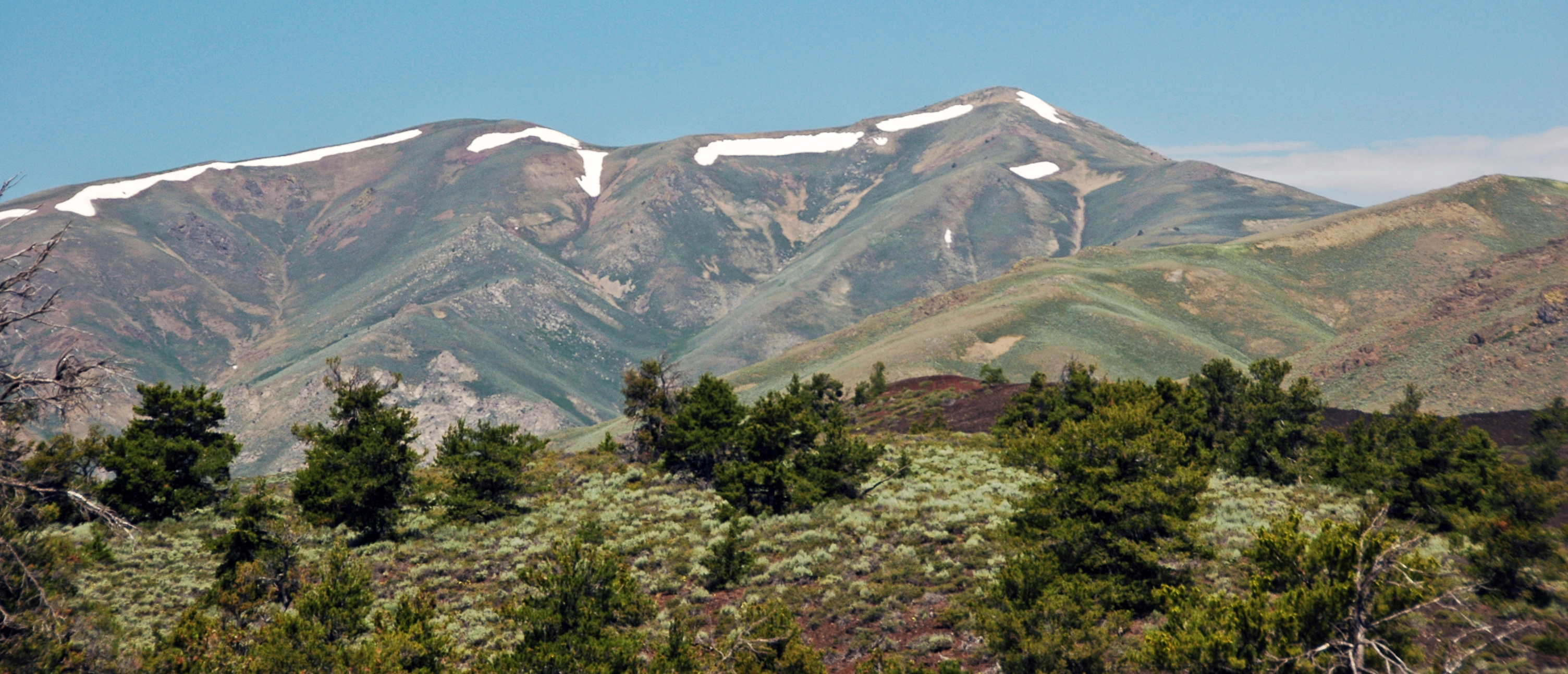
Blizzard Mountain from Craters of the Moon National Monument

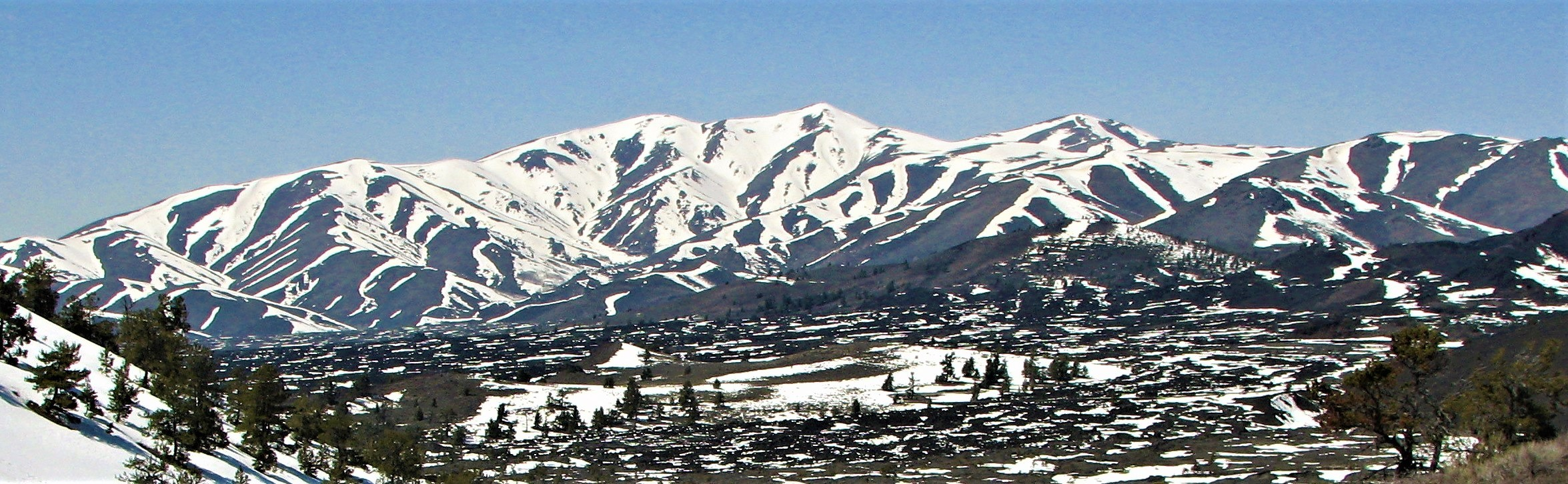
Blizzard Mountain in spring

== See also ==
- List of mountain peaks of Idaho
- Blizzard Mountain Ski Area
