= Angel's Perch =

Mountain in Idaho, United States

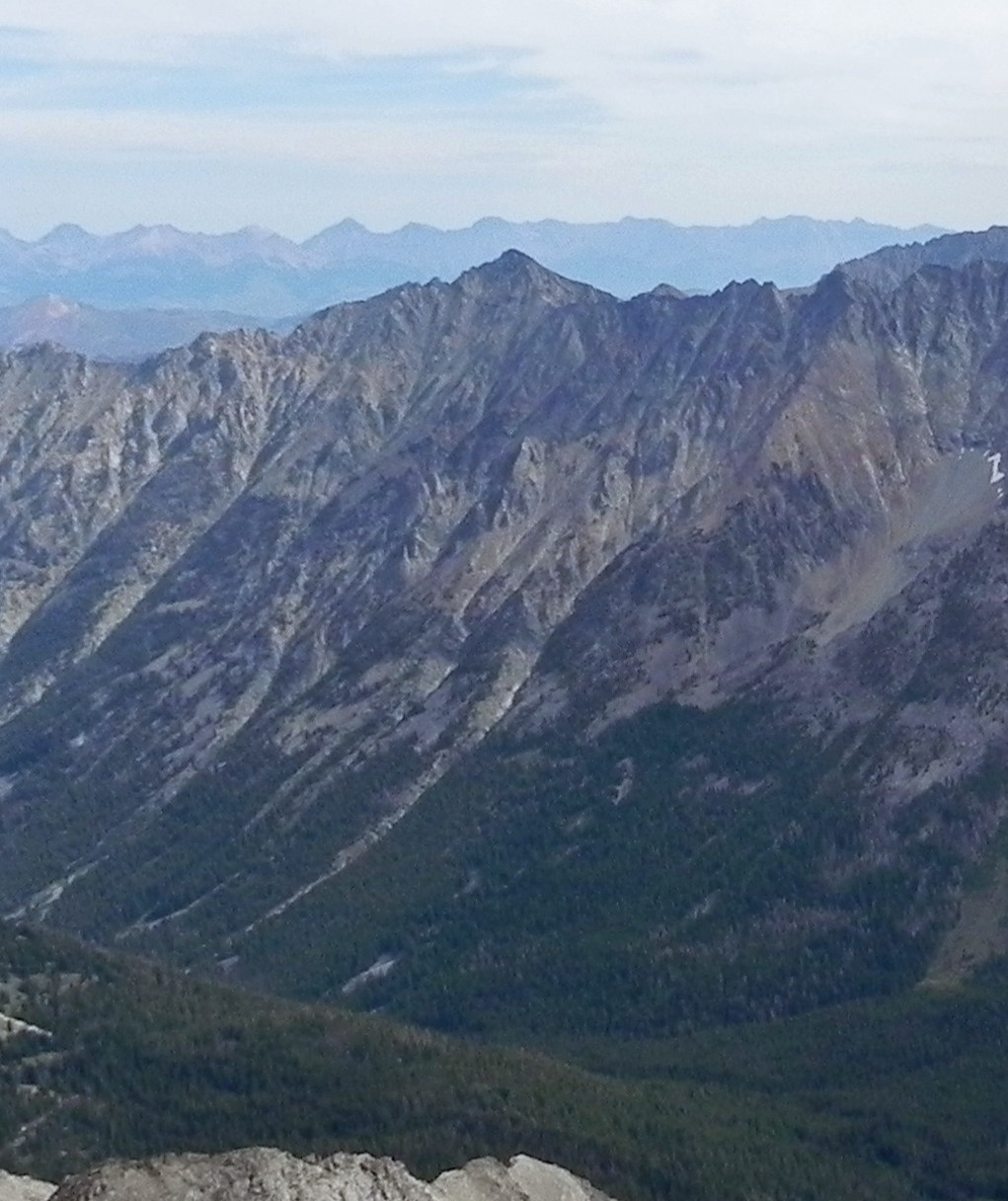
- Angel's Perch viewed from Hyndman Peak

Highest point
- Elevation: 11,687 ft (3,562 m)
- Prominence: 487 ft (148 m)
- Coordinates: 43°47′50″N 114°04′02″W

Geography
- Location within Idaho
- Location: Custer County, Idaho, U.S.
- Parent range: Pioneer Mountains
- Topo map: USGS Standhope Peak

Climbing
- Easiest route: Simple scramble, class 2

Angel's Perch, at 11,687 feet (3,562 m) above sea level is the 11th highest peak in the Pioneer Mountains of Idaho. The peak is located in Salmon-Challis National Forest and Custer County. It is the 32nd highest peak in Idaho and less than 2.3 mi (3.7 km) northwest of Standhope Peak.
