= Old Hyndman Peak =

Mountain in Idaho, United States

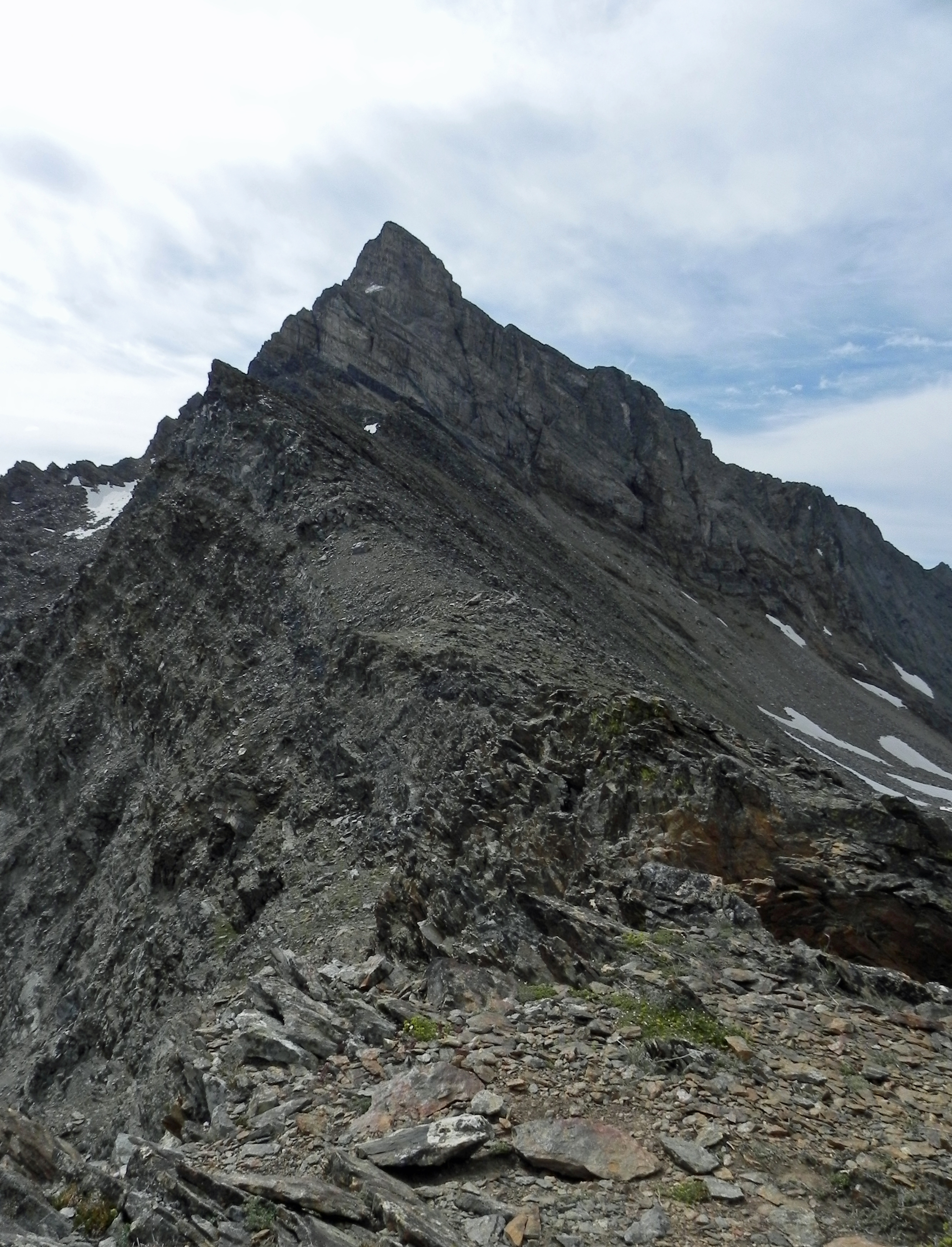
- Old Hyndman Peak

Highest point
- Elevation: 11,775 ft (3,589 m)
- Prominence: 935 ft (285 m)
- Coordinates: 43°44′27″N 114°07′01″W

Geography
- Location within Idaho
- Location: Blaine and Custer counties, Idaho, U.S.
- Parent range: Pioneer Mountains
- Topo map: USGS Grays Peak

Climbing
- Easiest route: Scramble, class 3

Old Hyndman Peak, at 11,775 feet (3,589 m) above sea level, is the eighth-highest peak in the Pioneer Mountains of the U.S. state of Idaho. The peak is located on the border of Sawtooth and Salmon-Challis National Forests as well as Blaine and Custer counties. It is the 27th-highest peak in Idaho and about 0.9 mi (1.4 km) southeast of Hyndman Peak and 0.8 mi (1.3 km) northeast of Cobb Peak.

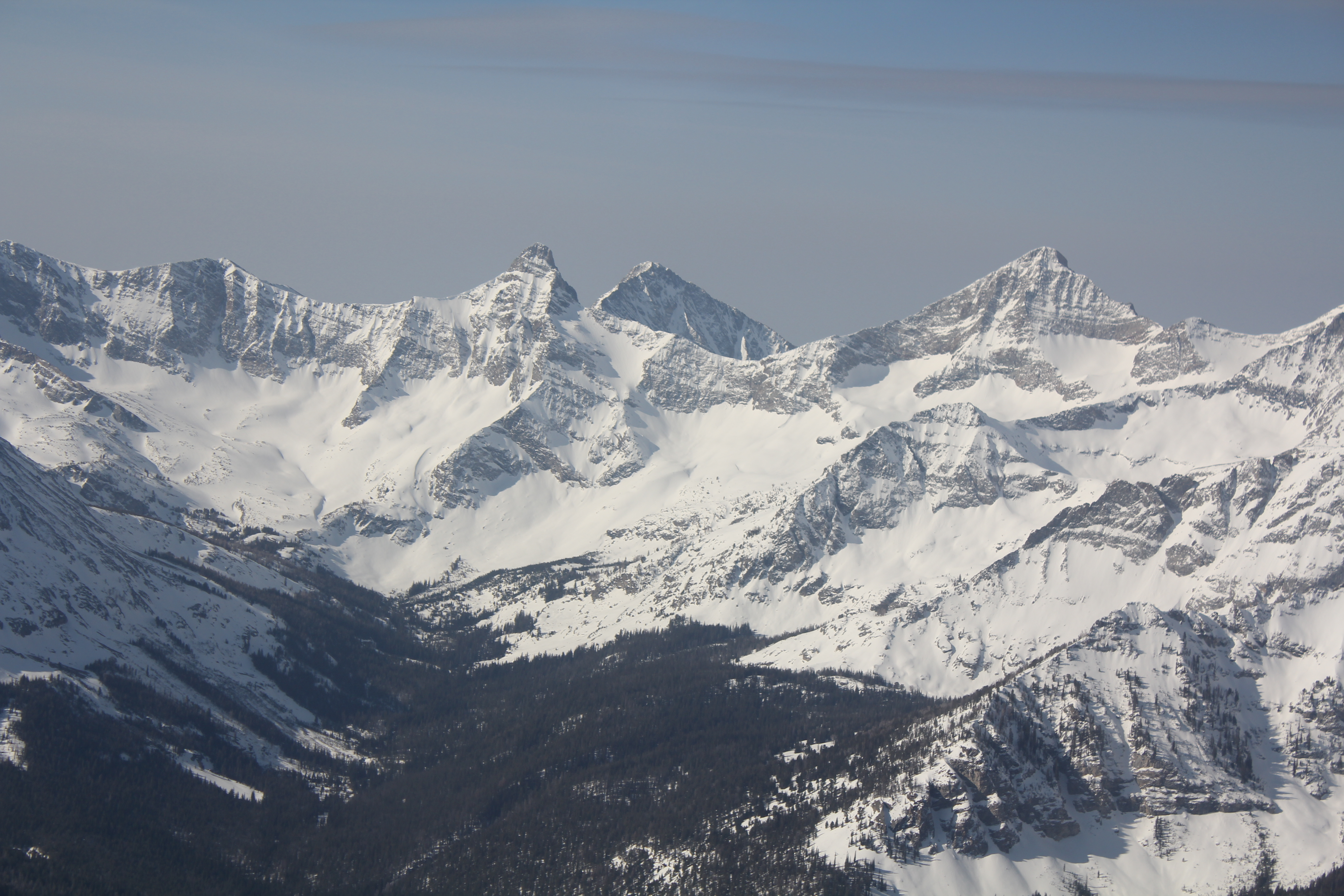
Aerial view from north featuring Old Hyndman Peak, Cobb Peak and Hyndman Peak
