= Kimberly Dilts =

American actress and filmmaker

- Born: Kimberly Dilts; New York City, U.S.
- Education: University of Texas, Austin
- Occupations: Filmmaker, actress, Theatre Director
- Known for: Angel's Perch

Kimberly Dilts is an American actress and filmmaker, most known for producing Angel's Perch.

== Early life ==
Born in New York, she attended the University of Texas in Austin where she gained a M.F.A in acting.

== Career ==
Initially working in her theatre, she produced, wrote and starred in a tour of Abby & June, a two-person play about travel and identity. She also produced and acted in Mr. Kolpert, a black comedy about suburban alienation. As a theatre director, she assistant-directed The Revenger's Tragedy (Off-Broadway), and has frequently collaborated with director Elena Araoz to create visually stimulating and textually rich work that has graced stages across the country.

Moving to Los Angeles, she has worked extensively as an actress in TV series, including 90210, Dirty Sexy Money and Law and Order: Criminal Intent. She also provided voice work for The Princess Blade and Sakura Wars.

== Angel's Perch ==
In 2013, Dilts produced the movie Angel's Perch. "Tired of waiting for the phone to ring," she and her husband, writer and producer J.T. Arbogast, decided to make the film themselves.

They crowdfunded their budget and went on to successfully self-distribute their movie.

Shot in Pocahontas County, West Virginia, the film is about a young architect dealing with his grandmother's Alzheimer's disease. The film has been applauded for dealing with issues of Alzheimer's and aging in a warm and life-affirming way.

The film stars Joyce Van Patten, J.T. Arbogast, Ally Walker, Ashley Jones, Ellen Crawford, and a supporting cast of West Virginia actors. It was directed by Charles Haine.
