= Standhope Peak =

Mountain in Idaho, United States

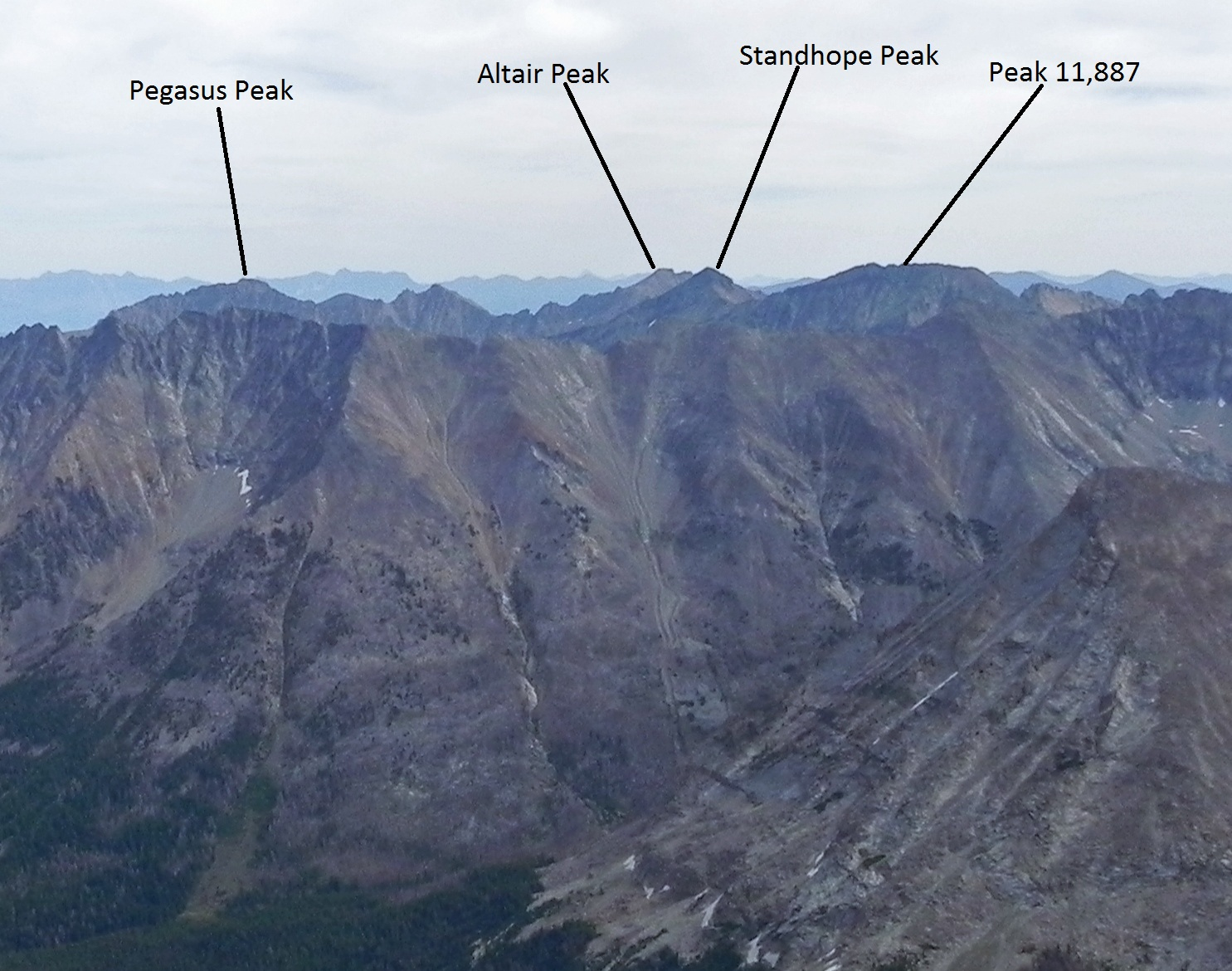
- Standhope Peak viewed from Hyndman Peak

Highest point
- Elevation: 11,878 ft (3,620 m)
- Prominence: 468 ft (143 m)
- Coordinates: 43°47′05″N 114°01′30″W

Geography
- Location within Idaho
- Location: Custer County, Idaho, U.S.
- Parent range: Pioneer Mountains
- Topo map: USGS Standhope Peak

Climbing
- Easiest route: Scramble, class 3

Standhope Peak, at 11,878 feet (3,620 m) above sea level is the fourth highest peak in the Pioneer Mountains of Idaho. The peak is located in Salmon-Challis National Forest and Custer County. It is the 20th highest peak in Idaho and about 0.75 mi (1.21 km) northeast of Peak 11,887 and 1 mi (1.6 km) southwest of Altair Peak.
