= Goat Mountain (Blaine County, Idaho) =

Mountain in Blaine County, Idaho, USA

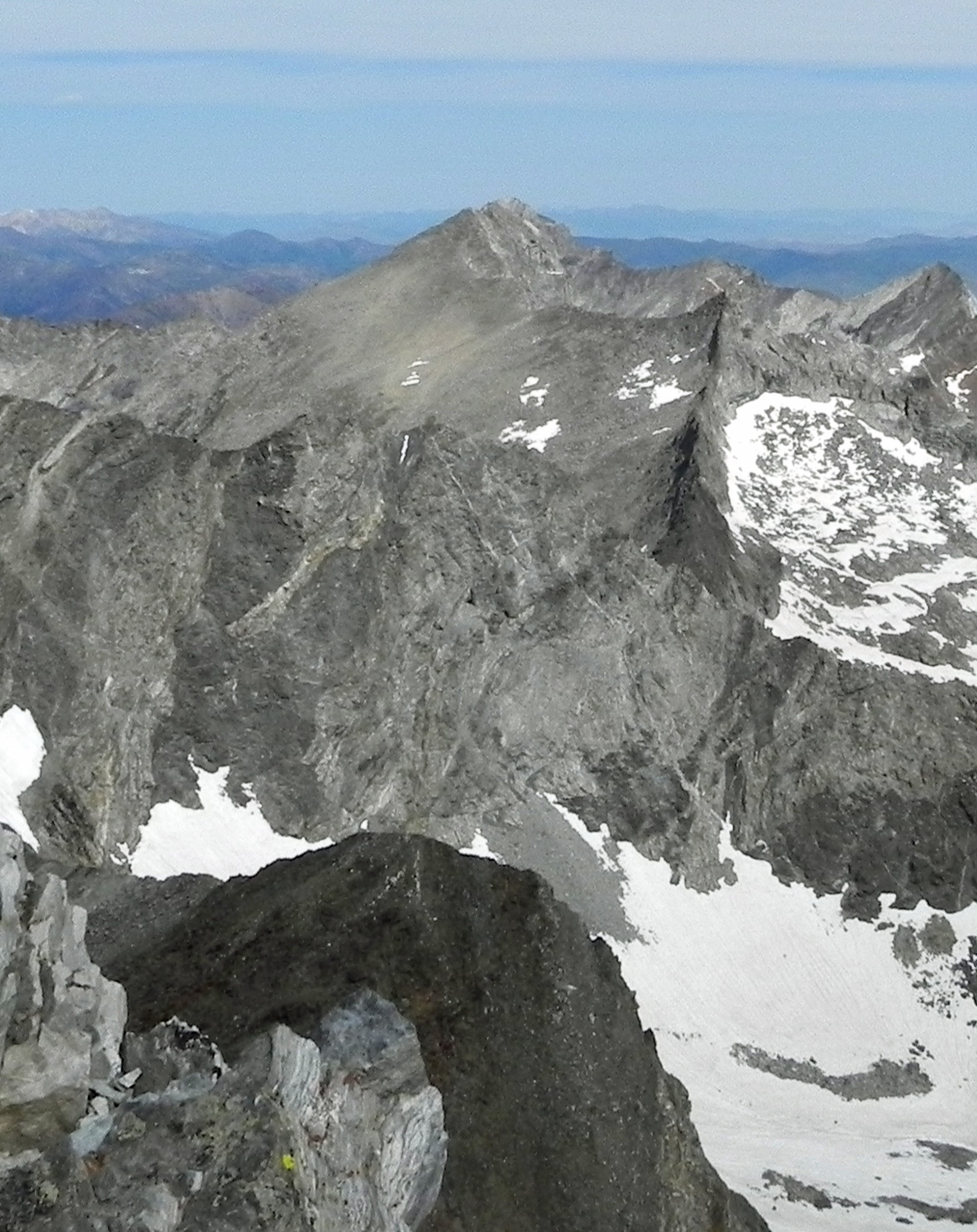
- Goat Mountain at center viewed from Hyndman Peak

Highest point
- Elevation: 11,918 ft (3,633 m) NAVD 88
- Prominence: 814 ft (248 m)
- Coordinates: 43°46′27″N 114°08′31″W

Geography
- Location within Idaho
- Location: Blaine and Custer counties, Idaho, U.S.
- Parent range: Pioneer Mountains
- Topo map: USGS Phi Kappa Mountain

Climbing
- Easiest route: Simple scrambling, class 3

Goat Mountain, at 11,913 feet (3,631 m) above sea level is the second highest peak in the Pioneer Mountains of Idaho. The peak is located on the border of Sawtooth and Salmon-Challis National Forests as well as Blaine and Custer counties. It is the 16th highest peak in Idaho and less than 2 mi (3.2 km) north-northwest of Hyndman Peak.
