= Pioneer Mountain (Idaho) =

Mountain in Idaho, United States

- Location within Idaho

Highest point
- Elevation: 10,525 ft (3,208 m)
- Prominence: 505 ft (154 m)
- Coordinates: 43°40′17″N 113°54′46″W

Geography
- Location: Custer and Blaine counties, Idaho, U.S.
- Parent range: Pioneer Mountains
- Topo map: USGS Star Hope Mine

Pioneer Mountain at 10,525 feet (3,208 m) high is a peak in the Pioneer Mountains on the border of Blaine and Custer counties in Idaho. The peak is also located on the border of Sawtooth and Salmon-Challis National Forests. The isolation of Pioneer Mountain is 1.47 miles (2.37 km). The southern and western slopes of the peak are drained by tributaries of Muldoon Creek, which as a tributary of the Little Wood River. The northern and eastern slopes are drained by tributaries of Star Hope Creek, which is a tributary of the Big Lost River.
