= Cobb Peak (Idaho) =

Mountain in Idaho, United States

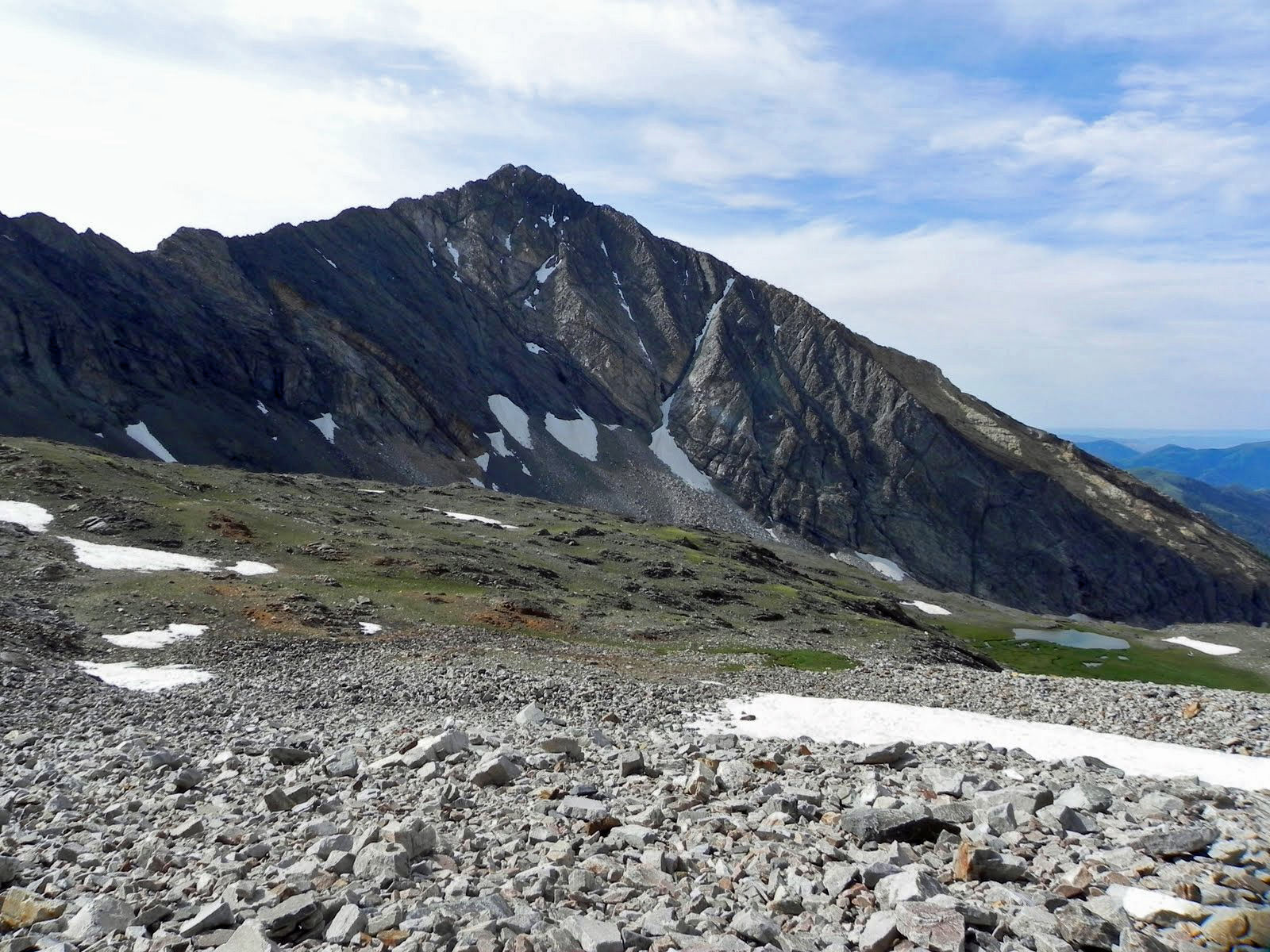
- Cobb Peak from the north

Highest point
- Elevation: 11,650 ft (3,550 m)
- Prominence: 650 ft (200 m)
- Coordinates: 43°43′52″N 114°07′35″W

Geography
- Location within Idaho
- Location: Blaine County, Idaho, U.S.
- Parent range: Pioneer Mountains
- Topo map: USGS Hyndman Peak

Climbing
- Easiest route: Scramble, class 3

Cobb Peak, at 11,650 feet (3,550 m) above sea level is the 12th highest peak in the Pioneer Mountains of Idaho. The peak is located in Sawtooth National Forest and Blaine County. It is the 35th highest peak in Idaho. Cobb Peak is 1.3 mi (2.1 km) south of Hyndman Peak and 0.8 mi (1.3 km) southwest of Old Hyndman Peak.
