= Hyndman Peak =

Mountain in Idaho, United States

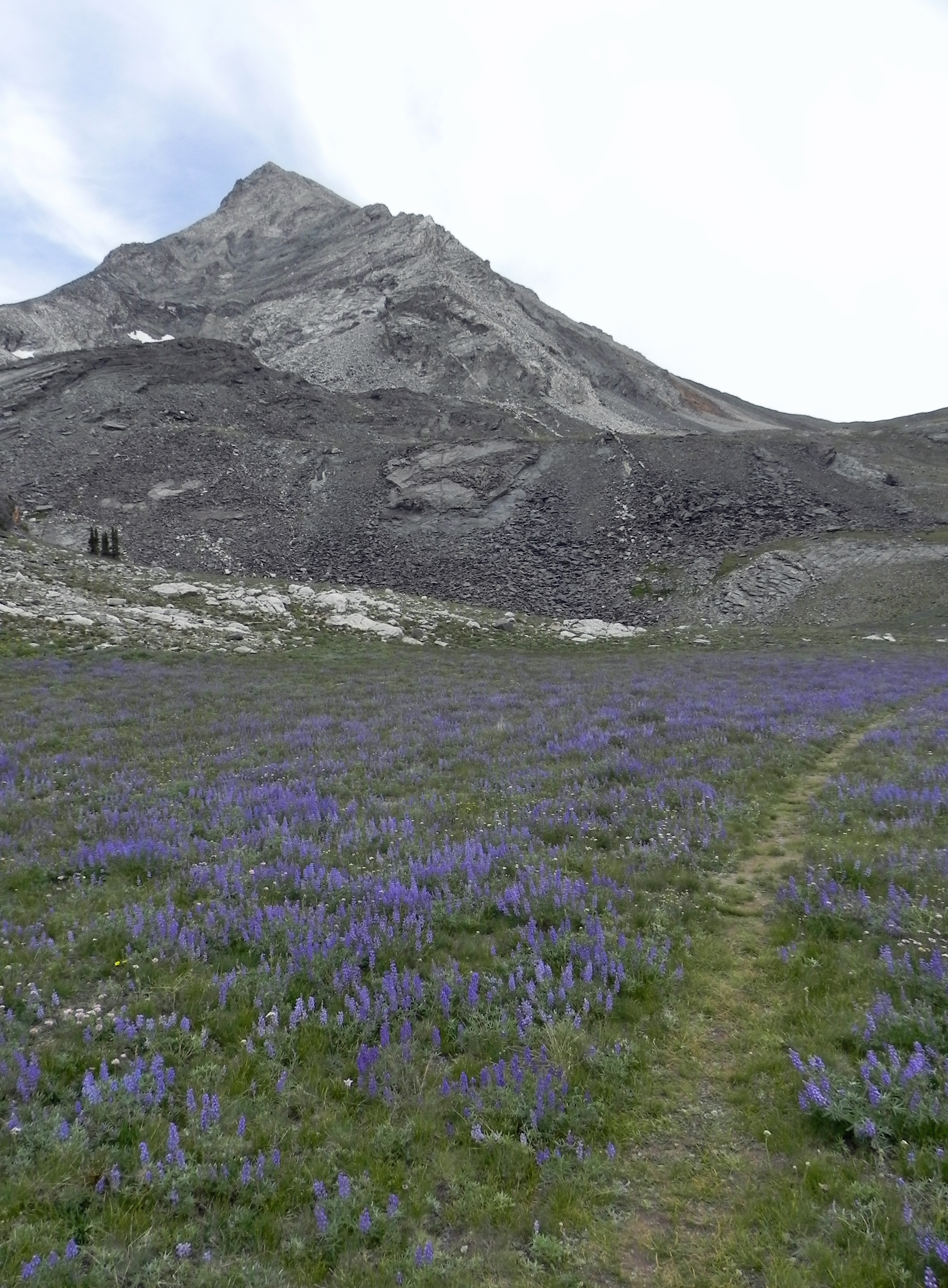
- Hyndman Peak

Highest point
- Elevation: 12,012 ft (3,661 m) NAVD 88
- Prominence: 4,809 ft (1,466 m)
- Coordinates: 43°44′58″N 114°07′52″W

Geography
- Location within Idaho Location within the United States
- Location: Custer and Blaine Counties, Idaho, U.S.
- Parent range: Pioneer Mountains
- Topo map: USGS Hyndman Peak

Climbing
- First ascent: 1889; 137 years ago
- Easiest route: Simple Scrambling, class 2

Hyndman Peak, at an elevation of 12,012 feet (3,661 m) above sea level, is the ninth highest peak in Idaho and the highest point in the Pioneer Mountains, Sawtooth National Forest, and Blaine County. Hyndman Peak is located on the border of Custer and Blaine counties. The towns of Hailey, Ketchum, and Sun Valley are west of the peak.

The mountain was named after Major William Hyndman, an early settler, and businessperson in the local mining industry. The first recorded ascent of Hyndman Peak was made in 1889 by W. T. Griswold and E. T. Perkins. The primary route to the summit is class 2, which along with its proximity to Sun Valley makes it a popular destination.

The trailhead to hike to Hyndman Peak is located at the end of Sawtooth National Forest road 203 along Hyndman Creek. The primary route is approximately six miles (10 km) one way from the trailhead and traverses through Hyndman Basin, which is bordered by Hyndman, Old Hyndman, and Cobb Peaks. The route follows an unmaintained trail and ascends the Hyndman-Old Hyndman saddle before reaching the summit.

== Climate ==
Climate data for Hyndman Peak 43.7508 N, 114.1329 W, Elevation: 11,266 ft (3,434 m) (1991–2020 normals)
Month	Jan	Feb	Mar	Apr	May	Jun	Jul	Aug	Sep	Oct	Nov	Dec	Year
Mean daily maximum °F (°C)	20.9 (−6.2)	20.3 (−6.5)	24.4 (−4.2)	29.7 (−1.3)	39.3 (4.1)	49.1 (9.5)	60.6 (15.9)	60.1 (15.6)	51.2 (10.7)	38.2 (3.4)	25.8 (−3.4)	20.0 (−6.7)	36.6 (2.6)
Daily mean °F (°C)	13.3 (−10.4)	11.8 (−11.2)	14.9 (−9.5)	19.2 (−7.1)	28.0 (−2.2)	37.0 (2.8)	47.2 (8.4)	46.6 (8.1)	38.2 (3.4)	27.5 (−2.5)	18.0 (−7.8)	12.6 (−10.8)	26.2 (−3.2)
Mean daily minimum °F (°C)	5.8 (−14.6)	3.2 (−16.0)	5.4 (−14.8)	8.8 (−12.9)	16.7 (−8.5)	24.9 (−3.9)	33.8 (1.0)	33.2 (0.7)	25.3 (−3.7)	16.8 (−8.4)	10.2 (−12.1)	5.3 (−14.8)	15.8 (−9.0)
Average precipitation inches (mm)	4.09 (104)	3.88 (99)	3.25 (83)	3.10 (79)	3.66 (93)	2.26 (57)	1.27 (32)	1.02 (26)	2.05 (52)	3.26 (83)	2.72 (69)	5.06 (129)	35.62 (906)
Source: PRISM Climate Group

View from the summit

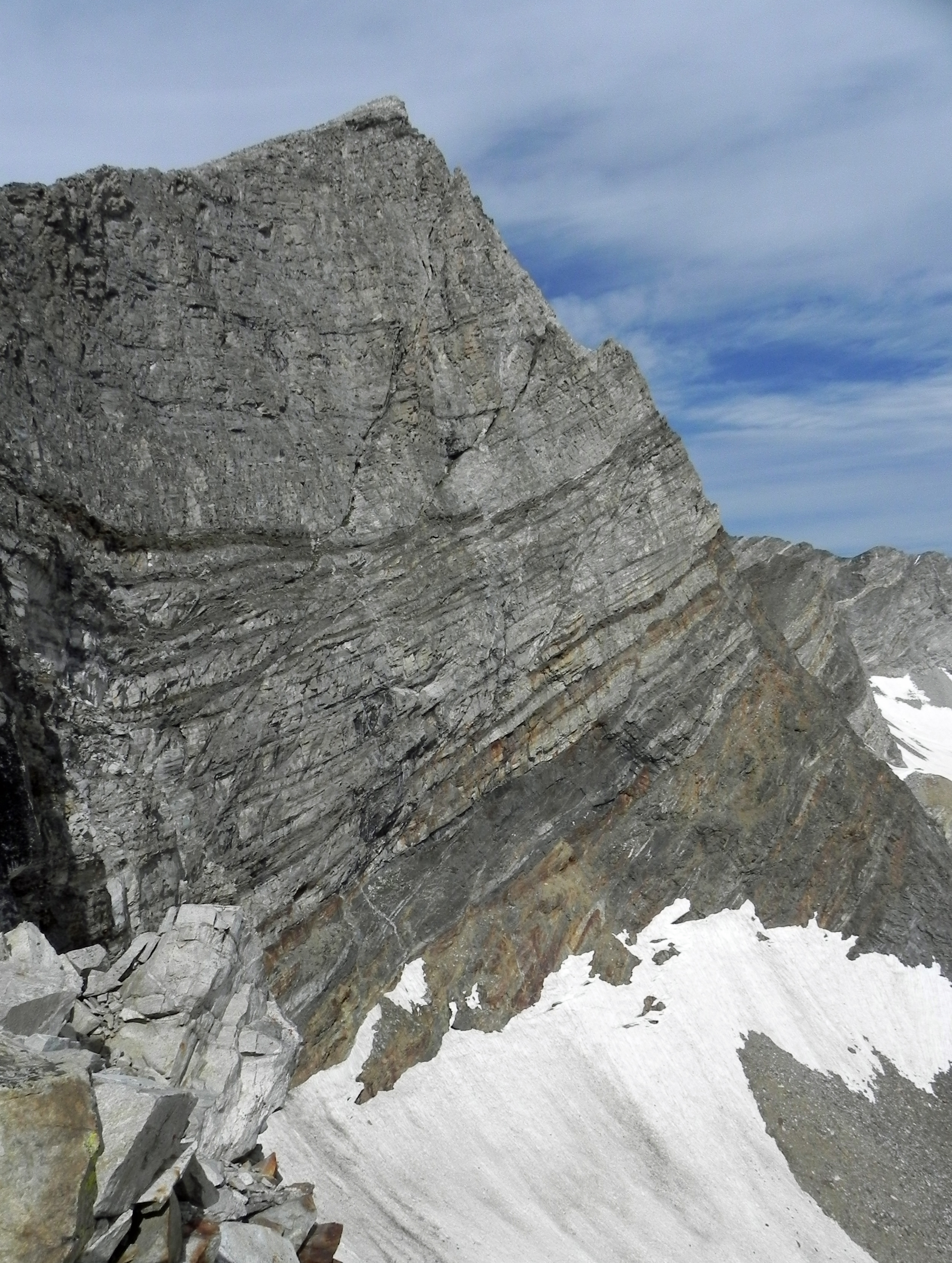

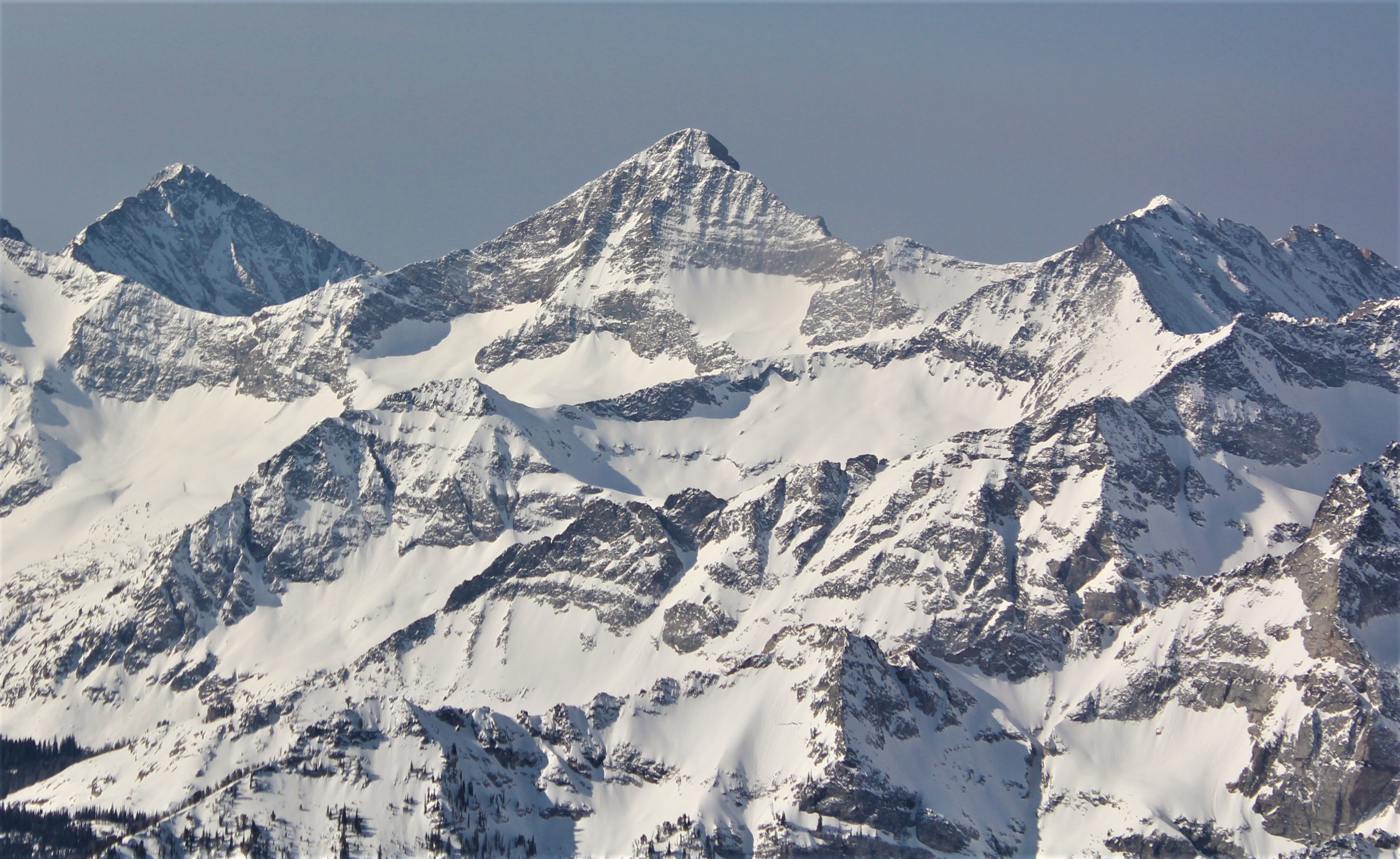
North face, aerial
