= Altair Peak =

Mountain in Idaho, United States

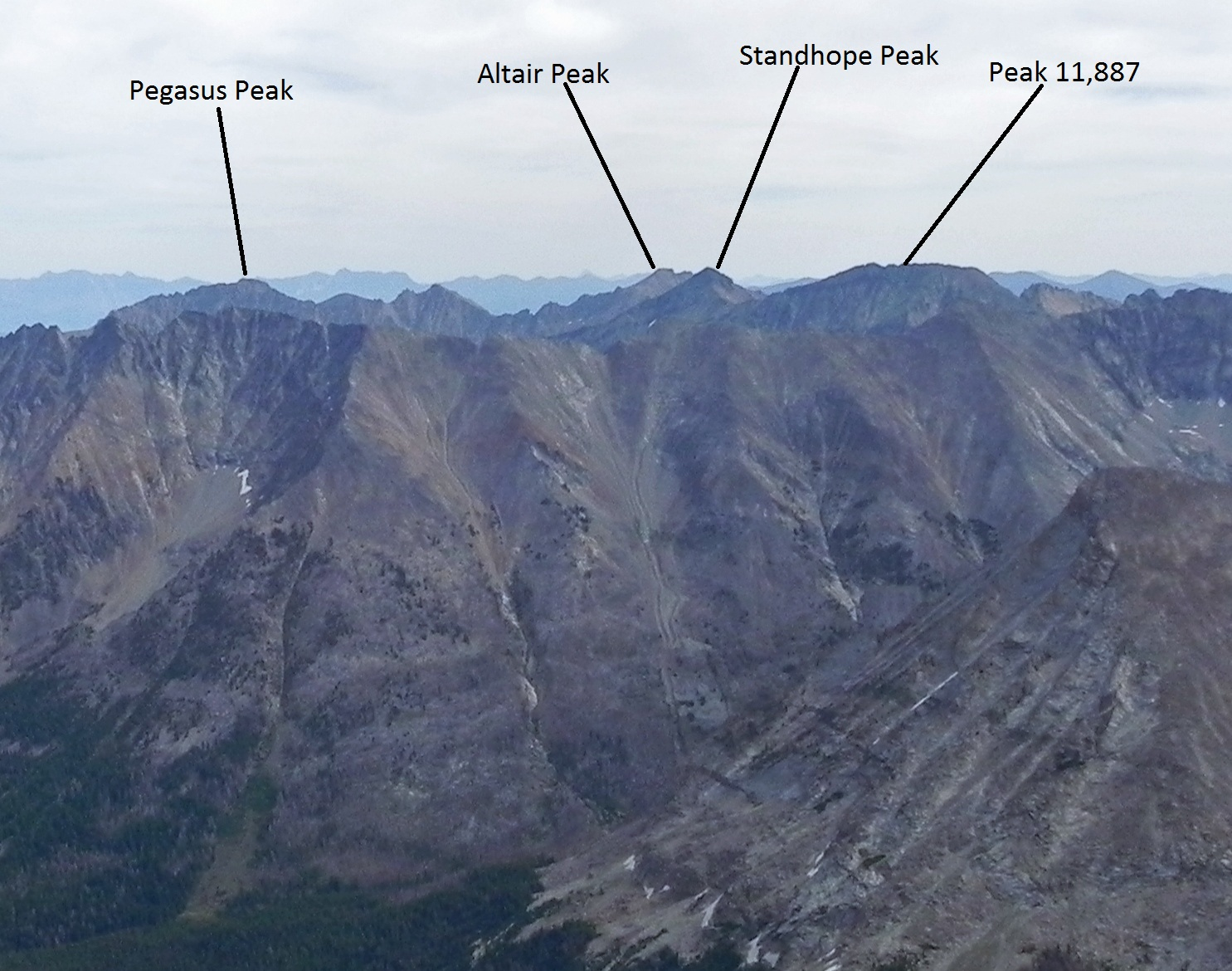
- Altair Peak viewed from Hyndman Peak

Highest point
- Elevation: 11,825 ft (3,604 m)
- Prominence: 785 ft (239 m)
- Coordinates: 43°47′33″N 114°00′27″W

Geography
- Location within Idaho
- Location: Custer County, Idaho, U.S.
- Parent range: Pioneer Mountains
- Topo map: USGS Standhope Peak

Climbing
- Easiest route: Scramble, class 3

Altair Peak, at 11,825 feet (3,604 m) above sea level is the seventh highest peak in the Pioneer Mountains of Idaho, United States. The peak is located in Salmon-Challis National Forest and Custer County. It is the 25th highest peak in Idaho and about 1 mi (1.6 km) northeast of Standhope Peak and 0.85 mi (1.37 km) southwest of Pyramid Peak.

== Climate ==
Climate data for Altair Peak 43.7927 N, 114.0071 W, Elevation: 11,319 ft (3,450 m) (1991–2020 normals)
| Month | Jan | Feb | Mar | Apr | May | Jun | Jul | Aug | Sep | Oct | Nov | Dec | Year |
|---|---|---|---|---|---|---|---|---|---|---|---|---|---|
| Mean daily maximum °F (°C) | 20.8 (−6.2) | 20.2 (−6.6) | 24.3 (−4.3) | 29.8 (−1.2) | 39.3 (4.1) | 49.0 (9.4) | 60.5 (15.8) | 59.9 (15.5) | 51.1 (10.6) | 38.1 (3.4) | 25.7 (−3.5) | 19.8 (−6.8) | 36.5 (2.5) |
| Daily mean °F (°C) | 13.2 (−10.4) | 11.6 (−11.3) | 14.7 (−9.6) | 19.1 (−7.2) | 27.9 (−2.3) | 36.8 (2.7) | 47.0 (8.3) | 46.4 (8.0) | 38.1 (3.4) | 27.4 (−2.6) | 17.9 (−7.8) | 12.5 (−10.8) | 26.1 (−3.3) |
| Mean daily minimum °F (°C) | 5.6 (−14.7) | 2.9 (−16.2) | 5.2 (−14.9) | 8.5 (−13.1) | 16.5 (−8.6) | 24.6 (−4.1) | 33.5 (0.8) | 32.9 (0.5) | 25.1 (−3.8) | 16.7 (−8.5) | 10.0 (−12.2) | 5.1 (−14.9) | 15.6 (−9.1) |
| Average precipitation inches (mm) | 5.26 (134) | 4.78 (121) | 5.56 (141) | 4.37 (111) | 5.03 (128) | 3.84 (98) | 1.59 (40) | 1.68 (43) | 2.29 (58) | 4.30 (109) | 4.25 (108) | 5.94 (151) | 48.89 (1,242) |
Source: PRISM Climate Group

The Bear Canyon SNOTEL is at the southern base of Altair Peak.

Climate data for Bear Canyon, Idaho, 1991–2020 normals: 7900ft (2408m)
| Month | Jan | Feb | Mar | Apr | May | Jun | Jul | Aug | Sep | Oct | Nov | Dec | Year |
|---|---|---|---|---|---|---|---|---|---|---|---|---|---|
| Mean daily maximum °F (°C) | 29.2 (−1.6) | 31.8 (−0.1) | 38.8 (3.8) | 44.5 (6.9) | 53.3 (11.8) | 63.2 (17.3) | 74.1 (23.4) | 72.8 (22.7) | 63.3 (17.4) | 49.8 (9.9) | 36.0 (2.2) | 27.2 (−2.7) | 48.7 (9.3) |
| Daily mean °F (°C) | 17.2 (−8.2) | 18.5 (−7.5) | 25.0 (−3.9) | 31.5 (−0.3) | 40.4 (4.7) | 48.5 (9.2) | 56.9 (13.8) | 55.9 (13.3) | 47.8 (8.8) | 36.7 (2.6) | 24.1 (−4.4) | 15.9 (−8.9) | 34.9 (1.6) |
| Mean daily minimum °F (°C) | 5.2 (−14.9) | 5.2 (−14.9) | 11.1 (−11.6) | 18.4 (−7.6) | 27.5 (−2.5) | 33.8 (1.0) | 39.7 (4.3) | 38.9 (3.8) | 32.2 (0.1) | 23.5 (−4.7) | 12.1 (−11.1) | 4.7 (−15.2) | 21.0 (−6.1) |
| Average precipitation inches (mm) | 2.70 (69) | 2.87 (73) | 3.21 (82) | 2.28 (58) | 2.65 (67) | 2.11 (54) | 0.94 (24) | 0.97 (25) | 1.37 (35) | 2.07 (53) | 2.52 (64) | 3.61 (92) | 27.3 (696) |
Source 1: XMACIS2
Source 2: NOAA (Precipitation)
