= Pioneer Mountains (Idaho) =

Mountain range in the state of Idaho

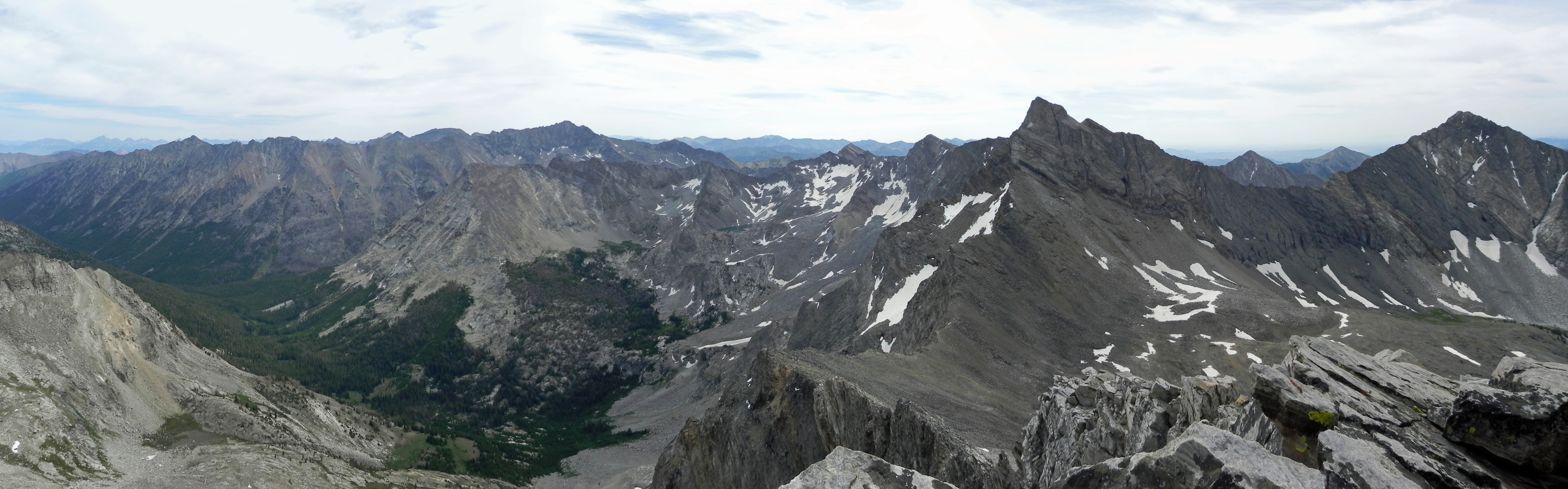
- Pioneer Mountains from Hyndman Peak

Highest point
- Peak: Hyndman Peak
- Elevation: 12,009 ft (3,660 m)
- Coordinates: 43°45′N 114°08′W

Dimensions
- Length: 18 mi (29 km) N/S
- Width: 20 mi (32 km) E/W

Geography
- Location within Idaho Location within the United States
- Country: United States
- State: Idaho
- Parent range: Rocky Mountains

The Pioneer Mountains are a mountain range in the U.S. state of Idaho, spanning Blaine, Butte and Custer counties. The range is bounded on the west by the Big Wood River, Trail Creek and Summit Creek, and the North Fork Big Lost River, on the north and east by the East Fork Big Lost River, Left Fork Cherry Creek, Cherry Creek, Dry Fork Creek, Saint Louis Canyon, and Champagne Creek, and on the south by the Snake River Plain. The mountains are located within Sawtooth and Challis National Forests.

The Pioneer Mountains range was named for the pioneer settlers of the region; many of the individual mountains within the range also bear the name of these pioneers.

== Peaks of the Pioneer Mountains ==
Peaks of the Pioneer Mountains of Idaho
Rank	Mountain Peak	Elevation	Prominence	Isolation	Location	Easiest Route
1	Hyndman Peak	12,008 ft 3660 m	4,806 ft 1465 m	30.2 mi 48.6 km	43.74936°N 114.131103°W	Class 2
2	Goat Mountain	11,913 ft 3631 m	814 ft 248 m	1.8 mi 2.9 km	43.774184°N 114.142059°W	Class 5
3	Peak 11,887	11,886 ft 3623 m	1,526 ft 465 m	5.34 mi 8.6 km	43.77485°N 114.030224°W	Class 3
4	Standhope Peak	11,877 ft 3620 m	466 ft 142 m	0.73 mi 1.17 km	43.784645°N 114.024879°W	Class 3
5	Devils Bedstead East	11,864 ft 3616 m	495 ft 151 m	1.76 mi 2.83 km	43.798592°N 114.152313°W	Class 3
6	Brocky Peak	11,841 ft 3609 m	761 ft 232 m	1.65 mi 2.65 km	43.756831°N 114.051867°W	Class 3
7	Altair Peak	11,824 ft 3604 m	784 ft 239 m	1.03 mi 1.65 km	43.792594°N 114.007596°W	Class 3
8	Old Hyndman Peak	11,775 ft 3589 m	935 ft 285 m	0.92 mi 1.48 km	43.74071°N 114.117141°W	Class 3
9	Duncan's Peak	11,755 ft 3583 m	394 ft 120 m	0.57 mi 0.92 km	43.756159°N 114.137679°W	Class 3
10	Pegasus Peak	11,736 ft 3577 m	617 ft 188 m	1.37 mi 2.21 km	43.812166°N 114.012169°W	Class 3
11	Angel's Perch	11,686 ft 3562 m	486 ft 148 m	2.29 mi 3.69 km	43.797248°N 114.067233°W	Class 2
12	Cobb Peak	11,650 ft 3551 m	650 ft 198 m	0.83 mi 1.33 km	43.731019°N 114.126431°W	Class 3
13	Pyramid Peak	11,627 ft 3544 m	387 ft 118 m	0.84 mi 1.35 km	43.796297°N 113.991427°W	Class 2
14	Salzburger Spitzl	11,601 ft 3536 m	322 ft 98 m	0.86 mi 1.39 km	43.774435°N 114.159269°W	Class 2
X	Smiley Mountain	11,509 ft 3508 m	2,628 ft 801 m	7.01 mi 11.28 km	43.69953°N 113.81013°W	unknown
X	Pioneer Mountain	10,525 ft 3208 m	505 ft 154 m	1.47 mi 2.37 km	43.67129°N 113.91281°W	unknown
X	Blizzard Mountain	9,314 ft 2839 m	1,932 ft 589 m	9.27 mi 14.92 km	43.4981311°N 113.6682246°W	Class 2

== Climate ==
The Stickney Mill SNOTEL is by the Trail Creek Road, which is on the northern edge of the range.

Climate data for Stickney Mill, Idaho, 1991–2020 normals: 7430ft (2267m)
Month	Jan	Feb	Mar	Apr	May	Jun	Jul	Aug	Sep	Oct	Nov	Dec	Year
Mean daily maximum °F (°C)	31.1 (−0.5)	34.0 (1.1)	41.8 (5.4)	47.9 (8.8)	57.1 (13.9)	65.8 (18.8)	76.7 (24.8)	75.5 (24.2)	65.9 (18.8)	51.9 (11.1)	38.1 (3.4)	29.3 (−1.5)	51.3 (10.7)
Daily mean °F (°C)	17.2 (−8.2)	19.2 (−7.1)	26.6 (−3.0)	33.8 (1.0)	42.7 (5.9)	49.6 (9.8)	57.6 (14.2)	56.3 (13.5)	48.6 (9.2)	37.6 (3.1)	25.0 (−3.9)	16.3 (−8.7)	35.9 (2.2)
Mean daily minimum °F (°C)	3.3 (−15.9)	4.4 (−15.3)	11.5 (−11.4)	19.6 (−6.9)	28.2 (−2.1)	33.4 (0.8)	38.5 (3.6)	37.2 (2.9)	31.1 (−0.5)	23.1 (−4.9)	12.0 (−11.1)	3.4 (−15.9)	20.5 (−6.4)
Average precipitation inches (mm)	1.71 (43)	1.70 (43)	1.93 (49)	1.71 (43)	2.10 (53)	1.80 (46)	0.91 (23)	0.81 (21)	1.20 (30)	1.59 (40)	1.55 (39)	2.09 (53)	19.1 (483)
Source 1: XMACIS2
Source 2: NOAA (Precipitation)

There is a Remote Automated Weather Station in Copper Basin (Idaho), near the Copper Basin Airport.

Climate data for Copper Basin (RAWS), Idaho, 1991–2020 normals: 7820ft (2384m)
Month	Jan	Feb	Mar	Apr	May	Jun	Jul	Aug	Sep	Oct	Nov	Dec	Year
Mean daily maximum °F (°C)	28.9 (−1.7)	32.2 (0.1)	40.2 (4.6)	45.4 (7.4)	54.5 (12.5)	63.4 (17.4)	74.6 (23.7)	73.7 (23.2)	64.5 (18.1)	51.0 (10.6)	38.7 (3.7)	28.8 (−1.8)	49.7 (9.8)
Daily mean °F (°C)	13.5 (−10.3)	15.3 (−9.3)	23.2 (−4.9)	31.0 (−0.6)	40.1 (4.5)	46.7 (8.2)	54.2 (12.3)	53.2 (11.8)	45.4 (7.4)	34.5 (1.4)	22.4 (−5.3)	13.1 (−10.5)	32.7 (0.4)
Mean daily minimum °F (°C)	−2.1 (−18.9)	−1.6 (−18.7)	5.5 (−14.7)	15.4 (−9.2)	25.7 (−3.5)	29.9 (−1.2)	33.7 (0.9)	32.6 (0.3)	26.3 (−3.2)	18.0 (−7.8)	6.1 (−14.4)	−2.8 (−19.3)	15.6 (−9.1)
Source: XMACIS2
