= Easley Peak =

Mountain in Idaho, United States

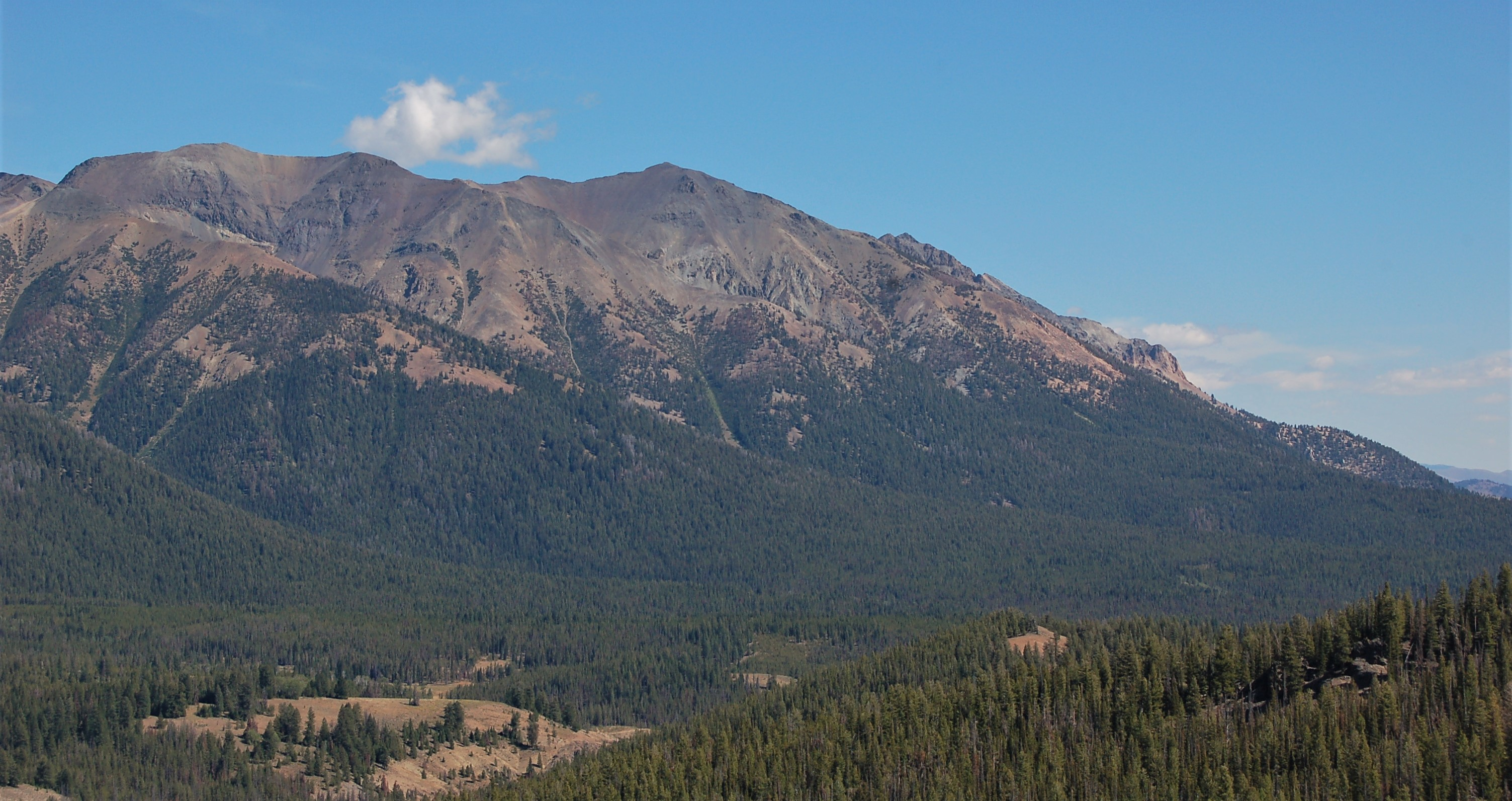
- West aspect, centered (Cerro Ciento to left of cloud)

Highest point
- Elevation: 11,108 ft (3,386 m)
- Prominence: 368 ft (112 m)
- Parent peak: Cerro Ciento (11,154 ft)
- Isolation: 0.85 mi (1.37 km)
- Coordinates: 43°51′06″N 114°34′55″W

Naming
- Etymology: John V. Easley

Geography
- Location within Idaho Location within the United States
- Location: Hemingway–Boulders Wilderness
- Country: United States of America
- State: Idaho
- County: Blaine / Custer
- Parent range: Boulder Mountains; Rocky Mountains
- Topo map: USGS Easley Hot Springs

Climbing
- Easiest route: class 2 hiking

Easley Peak is an 11,108-foot elevation (3,386 m) mountain summit located on the common border that Blaine County shares with Custer County, in Idaho, United States.

== Description ==
Easley Peak ranks as the 100th-highest peak in Idaho and is situated on the crest of the Boulder Mountains which are a subset of the Rocky Mountains. The mountain is set 18 miles northwest of Ketchum, Idaho, in the Hemingway–Boulders Wilderness on land managed by Sawtooth National Forest. The peak can be seen from Highway 75 and Galena Summit. Precipitation runoff from the mountain's slopes drains south to the Big Wood River and north into headwaters of the South Fork of East Fork Salmon River. Topographic relief is significant as the summit rises 4,100 feet (1,200 meters) above Big Wood River in three miles. Neighbors include line parent Cerro Ciento one mile to the north and Boulder Peak four miles to the east-southeast. This landform's toponym has been officially adopted by the United States Board on Geographic Names. John V. Easley was a pioneer who moved to this area around 1880 and opened a stage station at nearby Easley Hot Springs.

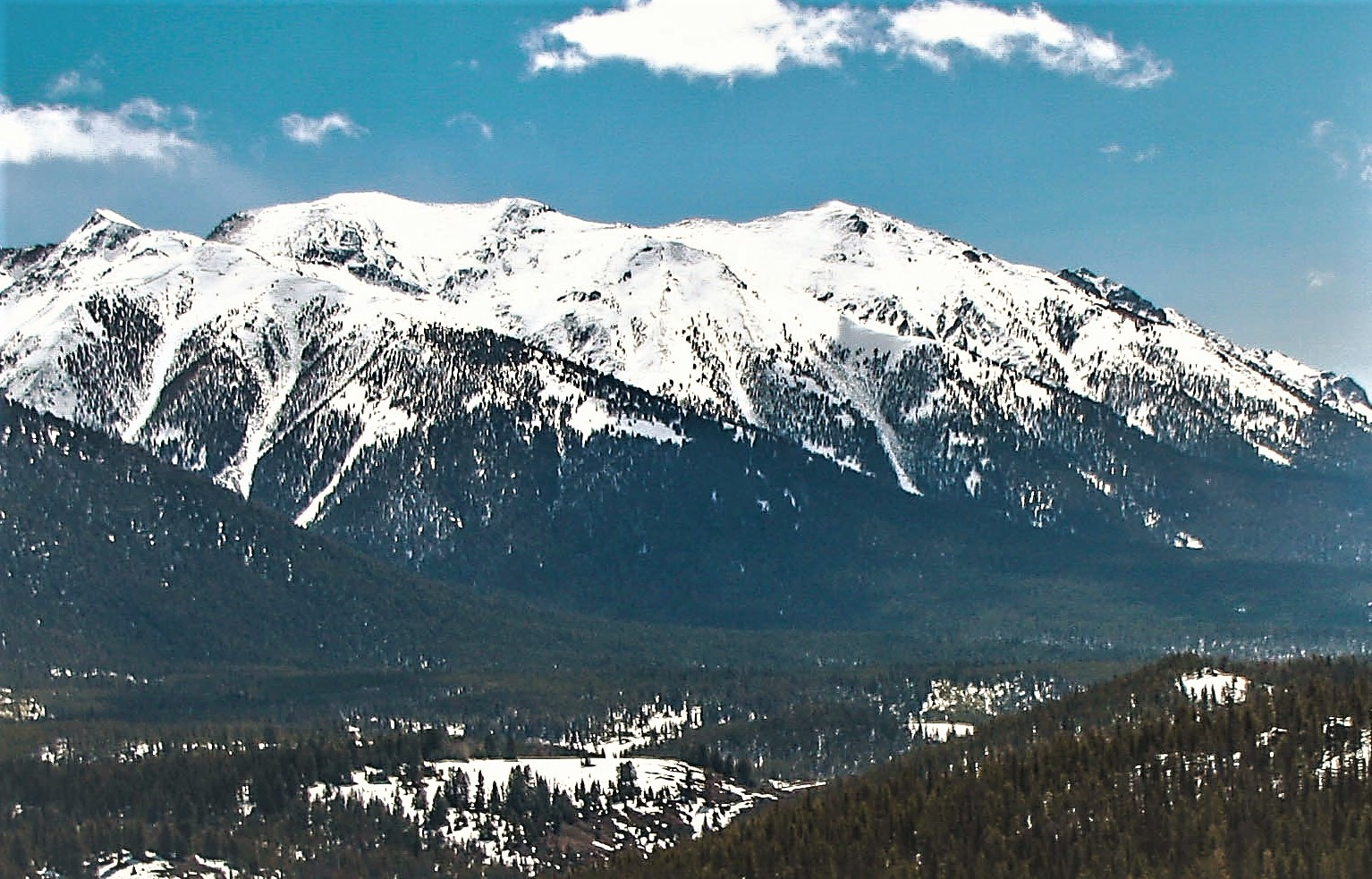
Cerro Ciento (left of center), Easley Peak (right of center) viewed from the west at Galena Summit.

== Climate ==
Based on the Köppen climate classification, Easley Peak is located in an alpine subarctic climate zone with long, cold, snowy winters, and cool to warm summers. Winter temperatures can drop below −10 °F with wind chill factors below −30 °F.

== See also ==
- List of mountain peaks of Idaho
