= Amber Lake =

Amber Lake may refer to:

== Places ==
- Amber Lake, a lake in Martin County, Minnesota, US
- Amber Lake, a lake in Amber, Washington, US

== Other uses ==
- Amber Lake, a 2010 film by Mekenna Melvin
- Amber Lake, a 2011 film by Joe Robert Cole
- Amber Lake (microprocessor), an Intel CPU microarchitecture

== See also ==
- North Amber Lake, an alpine lake in Blaine County, Idaho, US
- South Amber Lake, an alpine lake in Blaine County, Idaho, US
