= Kent Peak =

Kent Peak can refer to:

- Kent Peak (Boulder Mountains, Idaho), on the border of Blaine and Custer counties
- Kent Peak (Boundary County, Idaho)
- Kent Peak (Ravalli County, Montana)
