= North Fork Lake (Blaine County, Idaho) =

Lake in Custer County, Idaho, USA

- Location within Idaho Location within the United States
- Location: Custer County, Idaho
- Coordinates: 43°54′46″N 114°23′51″W
- Type: Glacial
- Primary outflows: Baker Creek to Big Wood River
- Basin countries: United States
- Max. length: 1,230 ft (370 m)
- Max. width: 385 ft (117 m)
- Surface elevation: 9,345 ft (2,848 m)

North Fork Lake is an alpine lake in Custer County, Idaho, United States, located in the Boulder Mountains in Salmon-Challis National Forest. While no trails lead to the lake, it is most easily accessed from a trail from the end of forest road 128. The lake is located just northeast of Ryan Peak, the highest point in the Boulder Mountains.
