= Cerro Ciento =

Mountain in the state of Idaho

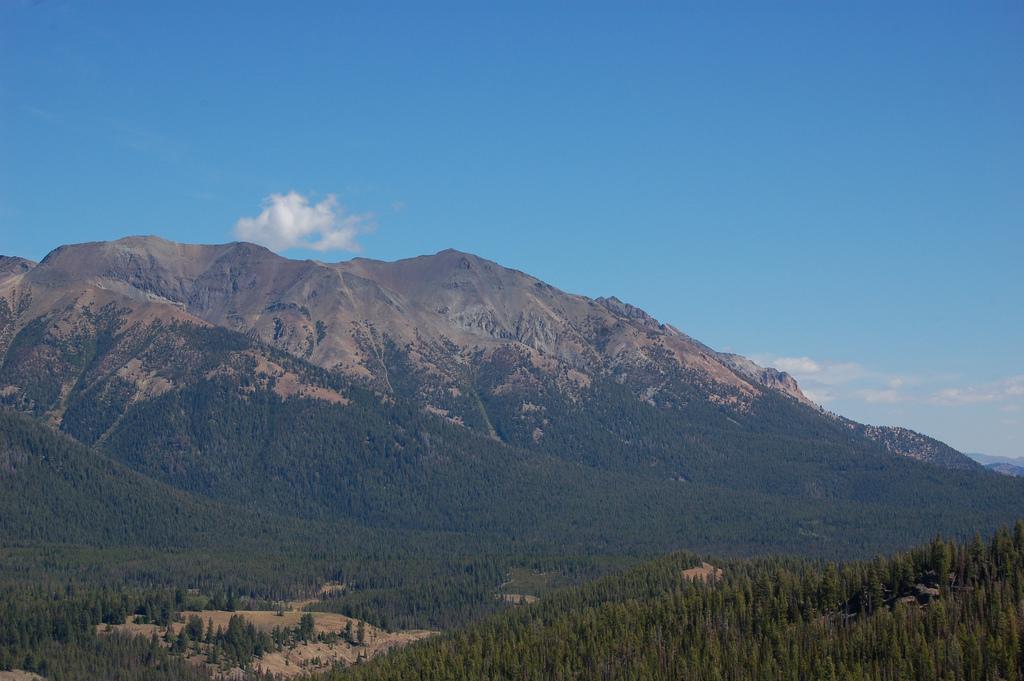
- Cerro Ciento is the highest peak on the left side of the photo (Easley Peak centered)

Highest point
- Elevation: 11,154 ft (3,400 m)
- Prominence: 554 ft (169 m)
- Coordinates: 43°51′49″N 114°35′00″W

Geography
- Location within Idaho
- Location: Blaine and Custer counties, Idaho, U.S.
- Parent range: Boulder Mountains
- Topo map: USGS Easley Hot Springs

Climbing
- Easiest route: Simple scramble, class 2

Cerro Ciento, at 11,154 feet (3,400 m) above sea level is the tenth highest peak in the Boulder Mountains of Idaho. Located in the Hemingway–Boulders Wilderness of Sawtooth National Recreation Area on the border of Blaine and Custer counties, Cerro Ciento is about 0.8 miles (1,300 m) north of Easley Peak. Cerro Ciento is the 80th highest peak in Idaho.

The easiest route is an off-trail class 2 scramble from the end of the Spring Creek Road, which can be accessed from Idaho State Highway 75. The peak is easily visible from the highway and Galena Summit.
