= Silver Peak (Idaho) =

Mountain in Idaho, United States

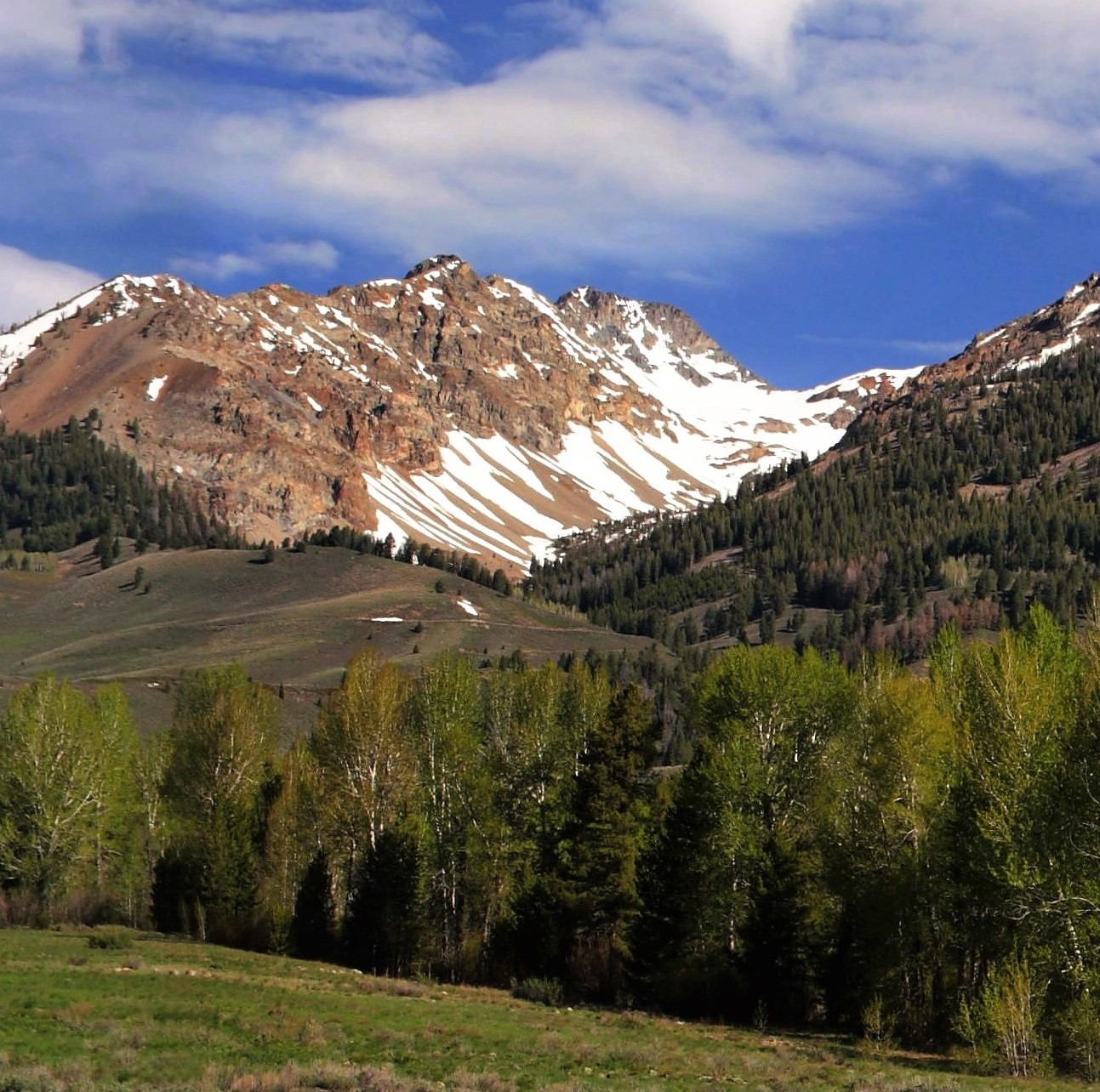
- South aspect, from Highway 75

Highest point
- Elevation: 11,125 ft (3,391 m)
- Prominence: 613 ft (187 m)
- Parent peak: Lorenzo Peak (11,270 ft)
- Isolation: 0.95 mi (1.53 km)
- Coordinates: 43°50′43″N 114°32′18″W

Geography
- Location within Idaho Location within the United States
- Country: United States
- State: Idaho
- County: Blaine / Custer
- Protected area: Hemingway–Boulders Wilderness
- Parent range: Boulder Mountains; Rocky Mountains
- Topo map: USGS Easley Hot Springs

Geology
- Rock type(s): Sedimentary rock, Granodiorite

Climbing
- Easiest route: South Ridge class 3

Silver Peak is an 11,125-foot-elevation (3,391 m) mountain summit in Idaho, United States.

== Description ==
Silver Peak ranks as the 99th-highest peak in Idaho, and it is part of the Boulder Mountains which are a subrange of the Rocky Mountains. The mountain is situated 15 miles (24 km) northwest of Ketchum, Idaho, on the common border shared by Blaine County and Custer County. It is set in the Hemingway–Boulders Wilderness on land managed by Sawtooth National Forest. The peak is a popular climb and is visible from Highway 75. Precipitation runoff from the mountain's south slopes drains to the Big Wood River via Silver Creek and Boulder Creek, whereas the north slope drains into headwaters of the South Fork of the East Fork Salmon River. Topographic relief is significant as the summit rises 4,425 feet (1,349 meters) above Big Wood River in four miles (6.4 km). This mountain's toponym has been officially adopted by the United States Board on Geographic Names.

== Climate ==
Based on the Köppen climate classification, Silver Peak is located in an alpine subarctic climate zone with long, cold, snowy winters, and cool to warm summers. Winter temperatures can drop below 0 °F with wind chill factors below −10 °F. Climbers can expect afternoon rain and lightning from summer thunderstorms.

== See also ==
- List of mountain peaks of Idaho

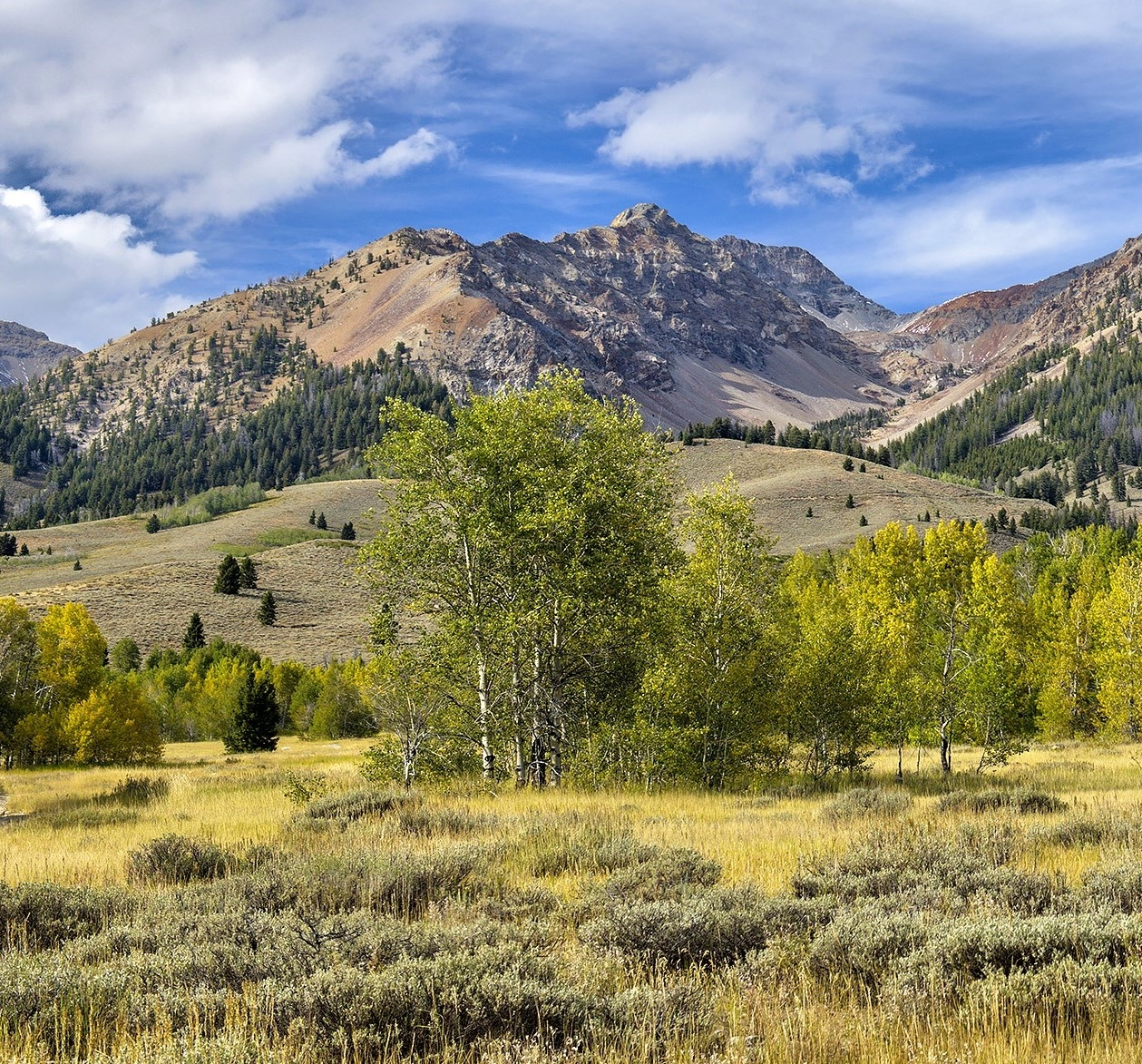
Silver Peak's south ridge from Highway 75
