= Boulder Peak (Idaho) =

Mountain in Idaho, United States

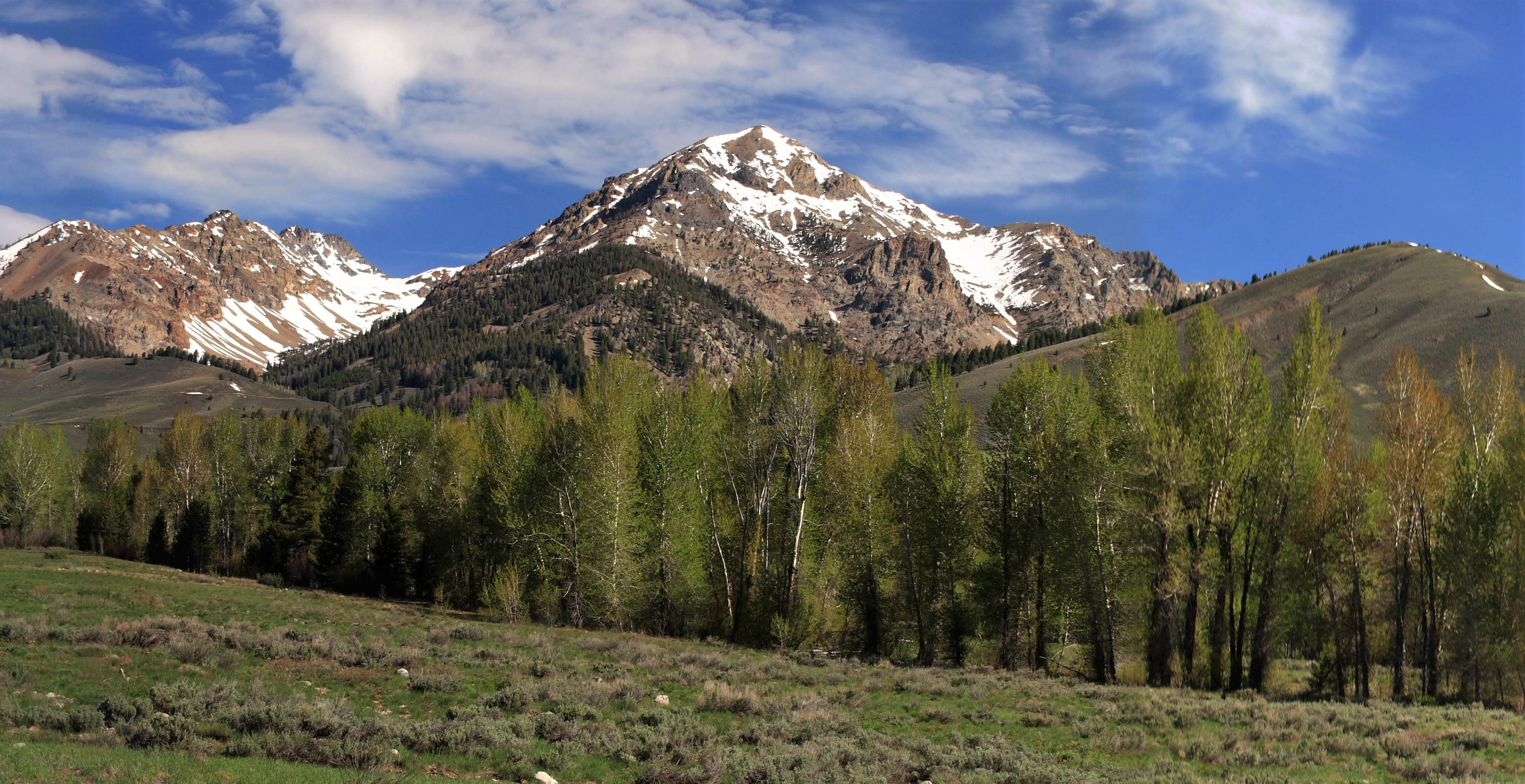
- South aspect, from Highway 75

Highest point
- Elevation: 10,981 ft (3,347 m)
- Prominence: 401 ft (122 m)
- Parent peak: Boulder Basin Peak (11,041 ft)
- Isolation: 0.74 mi (1.19 km)
- Coordinates: 43°49′57″N 114°31′06″W

Geography
- Location within Idaho Location within the United States
- Country: United States
- State: Idaho
- County: Blaine
- Protected area: Sawtooth National Recreation Area
- Parent range: Boulder Mountains; Rocky Mountains
- Topo map: USGS Easley Hot Springs

Climbing
- Easiest route: class 3 scrambling

Boulder Peak is a 10,981-foot elevation (3,347 m) mountain summit located in Blaine County, Idaho, United States.

== Description ==
Boulder Peak ranks as the 127th-highest peak in Idaho and is part of the Boulder Mountains which are a subset of the Rocky Mountains. The mountain is situated 15 miles northwest of Ketchum, Idaho, in the Sawtooth National Recreation Area on land managed by Sawtooth National Forest. The peak is easily seen from Highway 75, and is the most visible of the Boulder Mountains. Precipitation runoff from the mountain's slopes drains to the Big Wood River via Boulder Creek. Topographic relief is significant as the summit rises 4,400 feet (1,300 meters) above Big Wood River in four miles. This landform's toponym has been officially adopted by the United States Board on Geographic Names.

== Climate ==
Based on the Köppen climate classification, Boulder Peak is located in an alpine subarctic climate zone with long, cold, snowy winters, and cool to warm summers. Winter temperatures can drop below −10 °F with wind chill factors below −30 °F.

== See also ==
- List of mountain peaks of Idaho
- Easley Peak

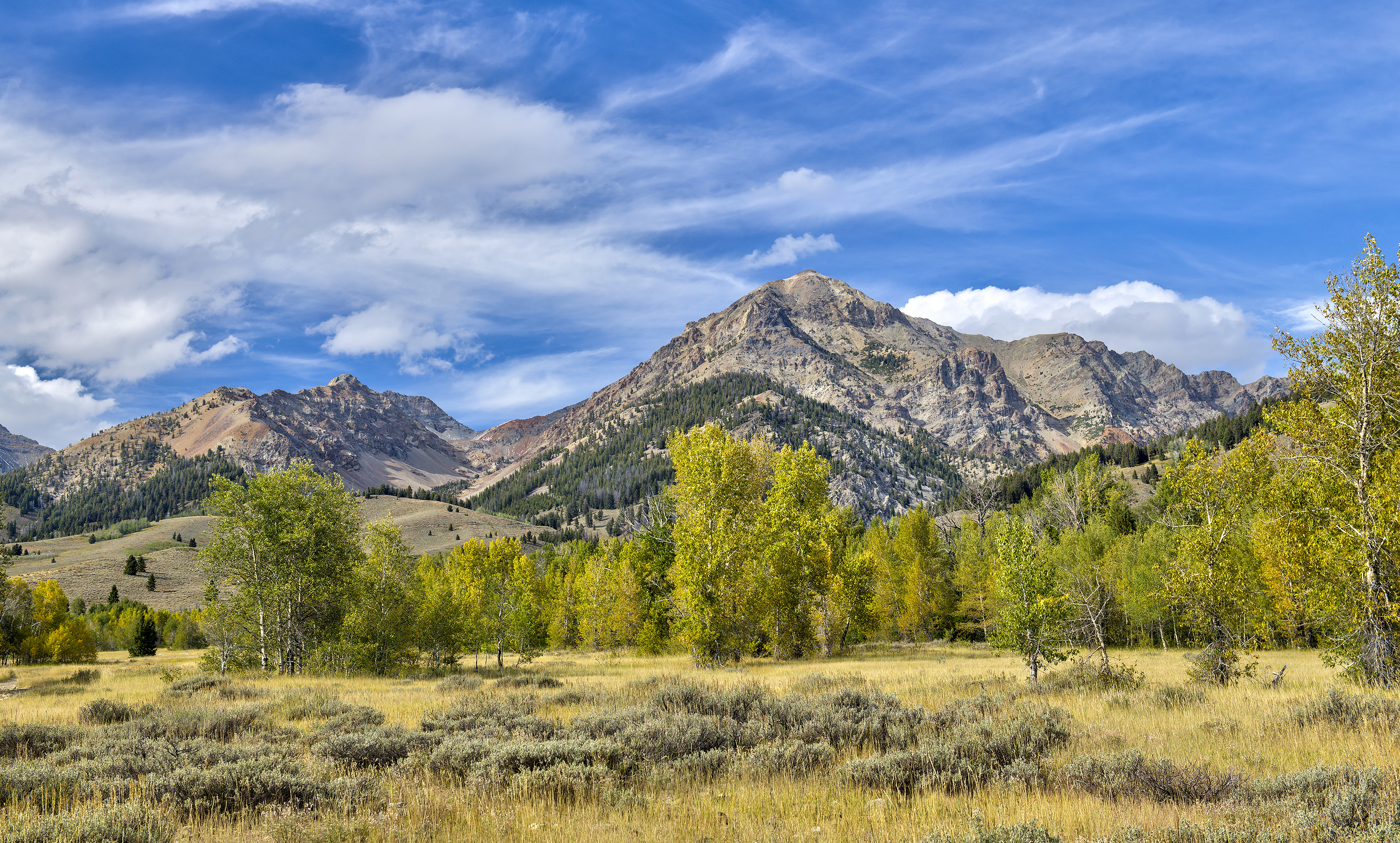
Silver Peak (left) and Boulder Peak (right of center)
