= Kent Peak (Boundary County, Idaho) =

Mountain in Idaho, United States

Coordinates: 48°44′04″N 116°41′00″W

- Location within Idaho

Highest point
- Elevation: 7,243 ft (2,208 m)
- Prominence: 1,223 ft (373 m)
- Listing: North America isolated peaks ??nd; US most prominent peaks ??th; U.S. state high point ??th

Geography
- Location: Boundary County, Idaho, U.S.
- Parent range: Boulder Mountains
- Topo map: USGS KentPeak

Kent Peak is a summit in the U.S. state of Idaho, with an elevation of 7,243 feet (2,208 m).

Kent Peak was named after a pioneer trapper.

== See also ==
- Kent Peak (Boulder Mountains, Idaho) - The other Kent peak in Idaho
- List of mountains of Idaho
- List of mountain peaks of Idaho
- List of mountain ranges in Idaho
- List of U.S. states by elevation
