= Big Fall Creek Lake =

Lake in Custer County, Idaho, United States

- Location within Idaho Location within the United States
- Location: Custer County, Idaho
- Coordinates: 43°52′26″N 114°14′51″W
- Primary inflows: Big Creek
- Primary outflows: Big Creek to Summit Creek
- Basin countries: United States
- Max. length: 540 ft (160 m)
- Max. width: 315 ft (96 m)
- Surface elevation: 9,075 ft (2,766 m)

Big Fall Creek Lake is an alpine lake in Custer County, Idaho, United States, located in the Boulder Mountains in Salmon-Challis National Forest. The lake is most easily accessed via forest road 168.
