= Lower Deer Lake =

Alpine lake in the state of Idaho

- Location within Idaho Location within the United States
- Location: Custer County, Idaho
- Coordinates: 43°56′32″N 114°37′56″W
- Primary inflows: Deer Creek
- Primary outflows: Deer Creek to Germania Creek
- Basin countries: United States
- Max. length: 585 ft (178 m)
- Max. width: 355 ft (108 m)
- Surface elevation: 9,500 ft (2,900 m)

Lower Deer Lake is an alpine lake in Custer County, Idaho, United States, located in the Boulder Mountains in Sawtooth National Recreation Area. While no trails lead to the lake, it is most easily accessed from trails 111 or 215. It is located just north and downstream of Upper Deer Lake.
