= Window Lake =

Alpine lake in Blaine County, Idaho, United States

- Location within Idaho Location within the United States
- Location: Blaine County, Idaho
- Coordinates: 43.855139°N 114.509255°W
- Type: Glacial
- Primary outflows: West Fork Big Wood River to Big Wood River
- Basin countries: United States
- Max. length: 570 ft (170 m)
- Max. width: 520 ft (160 m)
- Surface elevation: 10,035 ft (3,059 m)

Window Lake is an alpine lake in Blaine County, Idaho, United States, located in the Boulder Mountains in Sawtooth National Recreation Area. While no trails lead to the lake, it is most easily accessed from trails 129 or 184.
