= Governor's Punch Bowl =

Lake in Idaho, United States

- Location within Idaho
- Location: Blaine County, Idaho
- Coordinates: 43.898219°N 114.700783°W
- Primary outflows: Baker Creek to Big Wood River
- Basin countries: United States
- Max. length: 125 ft (38 m)
- Max. width: 85 ft (26 m)
- Surface elevation: 8,655 ft (2,638 m)

Governor's Punch Bowl is a small alpine lake in Blaine County, Idaho, United States, located in the Boulder Mountains in Sawtooth National Recreation Area. While no trails lead to the lake, it is most easily accessed from Idaho State Highway 75 near Galena Summit.
