= Ryan Peak (Idaho) =

Mountain in the state of Idaho

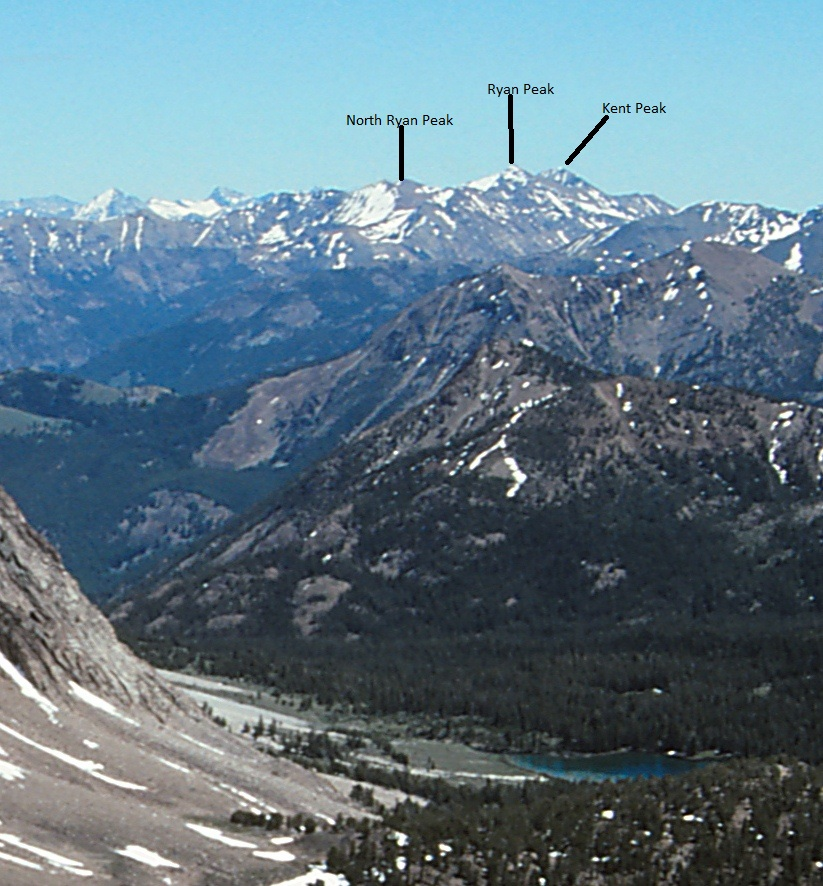
- Ryan Peak viewed from below Castle Peak

Highest point
- Elevation: 11,714 ft (3,570 m)
- Prominence: 3,194 ft (974 m)
- Coordinates: 43°54′08″N 114°24′34″W

Geography
- Location within Idaho
- Location: Custer County, Idaho, U.S.
- Parent range: Boulder Mountains
- Topo map: USGS Ryan Peak

Climbing
- Easiest route: Simple Scramble, class 2

Ryan Peak, at 11,714 feet (3,570 m) above sea level is the highest peak in the Boulder Mountains of Idaho. Located in Custer County, Ryan Peak is about 0.5 miles (800 m) north of the Blaine County border. The peak is also on the border of Sawtooth National Recreation Area and Salmon-Challis National Forest and partially within the Hemingway–Boulders Wilderness.

Ryan Peak is the second highest peak in the Sawtooth National Recreation Area, after Castle Peak as well as the 7th highest peak in Idaho. Kent Peak, which is the second highest peak in the Boulder Mountains is about 0.75 miles (1,210 m) southeast of Ryan Peak.

The primary route to Ryan Peak begins north of Ketchum along Idaho State Highway 75 at the Sawtooth National Recreation Area headquarters. Take national forest road 146 north from the headquarters until you reach the trailhead at the end of the road. Trail 115 ascends the ridge to the southwest of Ryan Peak, and from the ridge Ryan Peak is about a 1 mile (1,600 m) off trail hike from the ridge.

== Climate ==
Climate data for Ryan Peak (ID) 43.9017 N, 114.4105 W, Elevation: 11,106 ft (3,385 m) (1991–2020 normals)
| Month | Jan | Feb | Mar | Apr | May | Jun | Jul | Aug | Sep | Oct | Nov | Dec | Year |
|---|---|---|---|---|---|---|---|---|---|---|---|---|---|
| Mean daily maximum °F (°C) | 20.7 (−6.3) | 20.2 (−6.6) | 24.2 (−4.3) | 29.4 (−1.4) | 39.1 (3.9) | 48.6 (9.2) | 60.4 (15.8) | 60.0 (15.6) | 51.1 (10.6) | 38.0 (3.3) | 25.5 (−3.6) | 19.7 (−6.8) | 36.4 (2.4) |
| Daily mean °F (°C) | 13.4 (−10.3) | 11.8 (−11.2) | 14.9 (−9.5) | 19.2 (−7.1) | 28.1 (−2.2) | 36.8 (2.7) | 47.4 (8.6) | 46.7 (8.2) | 38.3 (3.5) | 27.4 (−2.6) | 18.0 (−7.8) | 12.6 (−10.8) | 26.2 (−3.2) |
| Mean daily minimum °F (°C) | 6.2 (−14.3) | 3.5 (−15.8) | 5.7 (−14.6) | 9.1 (−12.7) | 17.1 (−8.3) | 25.0 (−3.9) | 34.4 (1.3) | 33.4 (0.8) | 25.5 (−3.6) | 16.8 (−8.4) | 10.4 (−12.0) | 5.6 (−14.7) | 16.1 (−8.9) |
| Average precipitation inches (mm) | 4.40 (112) | 3.94 (100) | 4.29 (109) | 3.42 (87) | 3.34 (85) | 2.97 (75) | 0.91 (23) | 0.89 (23) | 1.74 (44) | 2.57 (65) | 3.29 (84) | 4.97 (126) | 36.73 (933) |
Source: PRISM Climate Group
