= Silver Lake (Blaine County, Idaho) =

Lake in Blaine County, Idaho, USA

- Location within Idaho Location within the United States
- Location: Blaine County, Idaho
- Coordinates: 43°50′19″N 114°32′56″W
- Type: Glacial
- Primary outflows: Silver Creek to Big Wood River
- Basin countries: United States
- Max. length: 535 ft (163 m)
- Max. width: 330 ft (100 m)
- Surface elevation: 9,680 ft (2,950 m)

Silver Lake is an alpine lake in Blaine County, Idaho, United States, located in the Boulder Mountains in Sawtooth National Recreation Area. While no trails lead to the lake, it is most easily accessed from the end of forest road 174. The lake is located southwest of Silver Peak and southeast of Peak 11,240.
