= Cecil D. Andrus–White Clouds Wilderness =

Protected area in the US state of Idaho

White Clouds Wilderness
- IUCN category Ib (wilderness area)
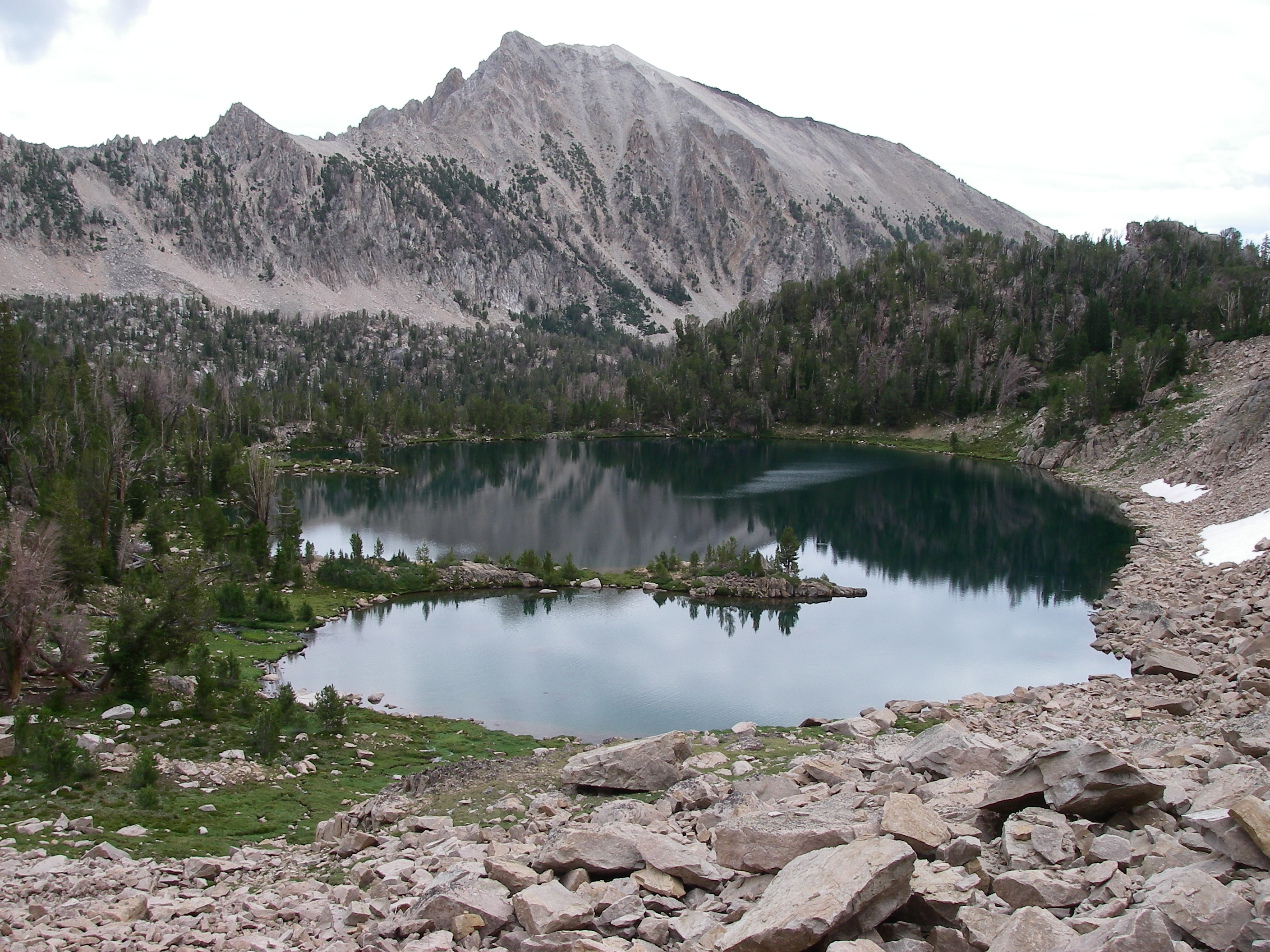
- Scoop Lake in the White Clouds Wilderness

- Location within Idaho Location within the United States
- Location: Custer County, Idaho, United States
- Nearest city: Stanley, Idaho
- Coordinates: 44.055°N 114.607°W
- Area: 90,769 acres (36,733 ha)
- Established: August 7, 2015
- Governing body: U.S. Forest Service; Bureau of Land Management

The Cecil D. Andrus–White Clouds Wilderness is a 90,769-acre (367.33 km^{2}) protected area in the western United States, located in Custer County, Idaho. The Sawtooth National Recreation Area, in the Sawtooth National Forest, manages the majority of the wilderness, with 450 acres (180 ha) managed by the Bureau of Land Management at the wilderness's eastern edge along the East Fork Salmon River. The wilderness encompasses part of the White Cloud Mountains and is north of the Hemingway–Boulders Wilderness and west of the Jim McClure–Jerry Peak Wilderness.

The area, originally White Clouds Wilderness, was added to the National Wilderness Preservation System in 2015 on August 7, with the passage of the Sawtooth National Recreation Area and Jerry Peak Wilderness Additions Act. Sponsored by second district representative Mike Simpson, a Republican from Blackfoot, it passed Congress without objection and was signed into law by President Barack Obama.

In 2018 it was renamed to honor the late Idaho Governor Cecil Andrus, over the opposition of Senator Jim Risch.

== See also ==
- List of lakes of the White Cloud Mountains
- Sawtooth National Recreation Area
- White Cloud Mountains
