= Kent Peak (Boulder Mountains, Idaho) =

Mountain in the state of Idaho

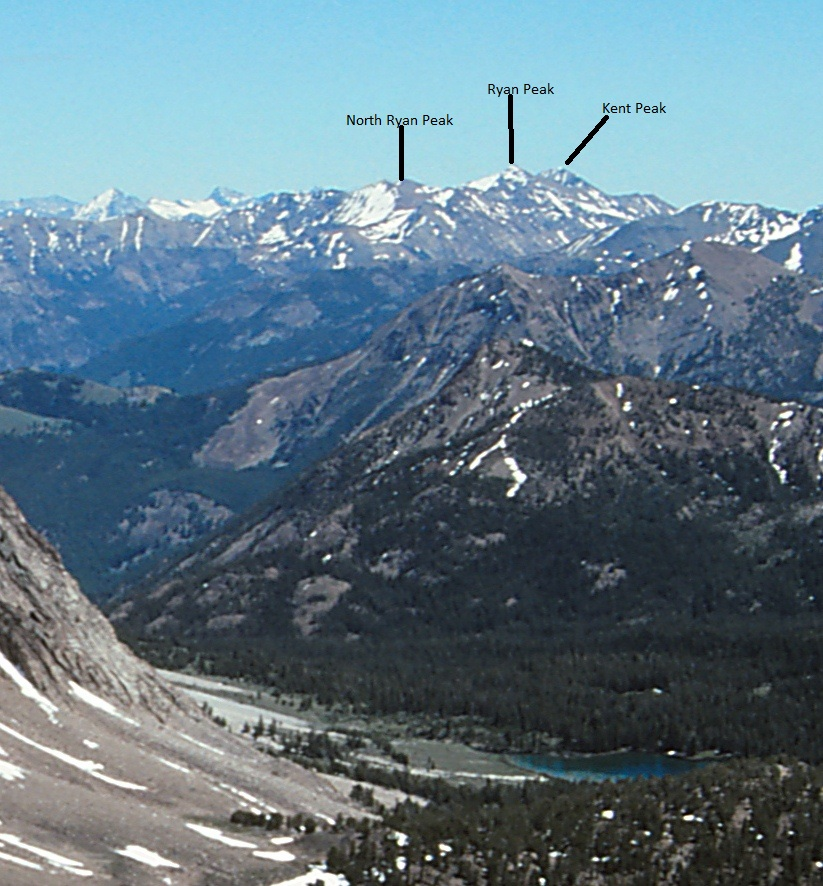
- Kent Peak viewed from below Castle Peak

Highest point
- Elevation: 11,664 ft (3,555 m)
- Prominence: 584 ft (178 m)
- Coordinates: 43°53′45″N 114°24′18″W

Geography
- Location within Idaho
- Location: Blaine and Custer counties, Idaho, U.S.
- Parent range: Boulder Mountains
- Topo map: USGS Ryan Peak

Climbing
- Easiest route: Scramble, class 3

Kent Peak, at 11,664 feet (3,555 m) above sea level is the second highest peak in the Boulder Mountains of Idaho. Located on the border of Blaine and Custer counties, Kent Peak is about 0.75 miles (1,210 m) south of the range's highest point, Ryan Peak. The peak is also on the border of Sawtooth National Recreation Area and Salmon-Challis National Forest and partially within the Hemingway–Boulders Wilderness. It is the 34th highest peak in Idaho.

The primary route to Kent Peak begins north of Ketchum along Idaho State Highway 75 at the Sawtooth National Recreation Area headquarters. Take national forest road 146 north from the headquarters until you reach the trailhead at the end of the road. Trail 115 ascends the ridge to the west of Kent Peak, but the primary class 3 route follows the south ridge.

== See also ==
- Kent Peak (Boundary County, Idaho) - The other Kent peak in Idaho
- List of mountains of Idaho
- List of mountain peaks of Idaho
- List of mountain ranges in Idaho
- List of U.S. states by elevation
