= Jim McClure–Jerry Peak Wilderness =

Wilderness area in Idaho, United States

- IUCN category Ib (wilderness area)
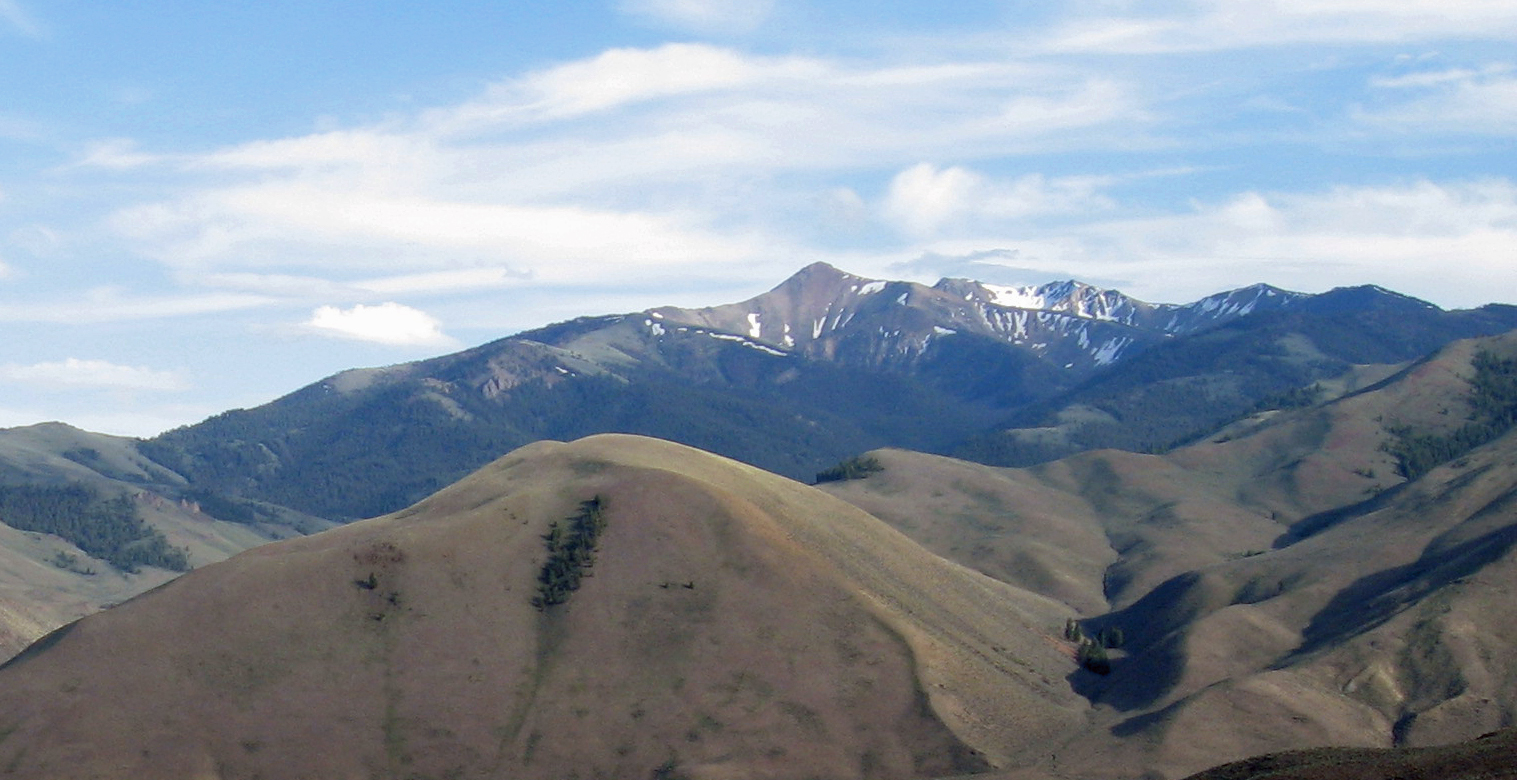
- Sheep Mountain in the Jim McClure–Jerry Peak Wilderness

- Location within the United States
- Location: Custer County, Idaho, United States
- Nearest city: Challis, ID
- Coordinates: 44.018°N 114.317°W
- Area: 116,898 acres (47,307 ha)
- Established: August 7, 2015
- Governing body: U.S. Forest Service; Bureau of Land Management

The Jim McClure–Jerry Peak Wilderness is a 116,898-acre (47,307 ha) protected area in Salmon-Challis National Forest and Bureau of Land Management land in Custer County, Idaho, United States. The wilderness directly adjoins the Hemingway–Boulders Wilderness on its southwest side and is east of the Cecil D. Andrus–White Clouds Wilderness, which it does not directly adjoin. It is named for Jim McClure who was a Senator from Idaho. The area was added to the National Wilderness Preservation System on August 7, 2015 with the passage of the Sawtooth National Recreation Area and Jerry Peak Wilderness Additions Act (Pub. L. 114–46 (text) (PDF)), which was sponsored by Representative Mike Simpson and passed Congress without objection before being signed into law by President Barack Obama.
