= North Amber Lake =

Alpine lake in the state of Idaho

- Location within Idaho Location within the United States
- Location: Blaine County, Idaho
- Coordinates: 43°50′30″N 114°28′26″W
- Type: Glacial
- Primary outflows: Amber Creek to West Fork Big Wood River
- Basin countries: United States
- Max. length: 350 ft (110 m)
- Max. width: 210 ft (64 m)
- Surface elevation: 9,040 ft (2,760 m)

North Amber Lake is an alpine lake in Blaine County, Idaho, United States, located in the Boulder Mountains in Sawtooth National Recreation Area. While no trails lead to the lake, it is most easily accessed from trail 146. The lake is located north of South Amber Lake, but in a separate sub-drainage.
