= South Amber Lake =

Alpine lake in Blaine County, Idaho, United States

- Location within Idaho Location within the United States
- Location: Blaine County, Idaho
- Coordinates: 43°50′11″N 114°28′26″W
- Type: Glacial
- Primary outflows: Amber Creek to West Fork Big Wood River
- Basin countries: United States
- Max. length: 560 ft (170 m)
- Max. width: 210 ft (64 m)
- Surface elevation: 9,150 ft (2,790 m)

South Amber Lake is an alpine lake in Blaine County, Idaho, United States, located in the Boulder Mountains in Sawtooth National Recreation Area. While no trails lead to the lake, it is most easily accessed from trail 146. The lake is located south of North Amber Lake, but in a separate sub-drainage.
