= Boulder Mountains (Idaho) =

Mountain range in Idaho, United States

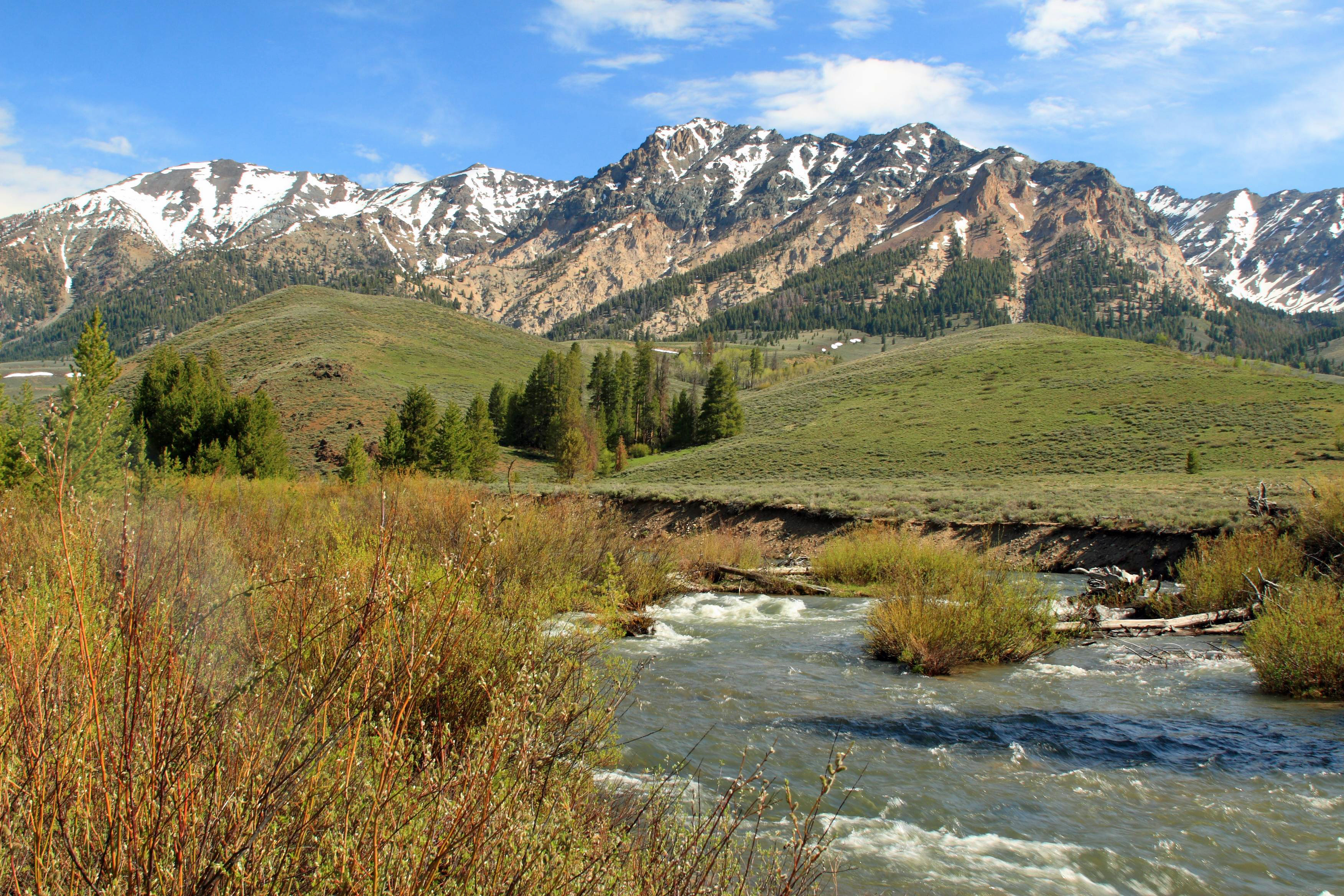
- Boulder Mountains and Big Wood River

Highest point
- Peak: Ryan Peak
- Elevation: 11,714 ft (3,570 m)
- Coordinates: 43°54′N 114°25′W

Dimensions
- Length: 55 mi (89 km) N/S
- Width: 38 mi (61 km) E/W
- Area: 743 mi^{2} (1,920 km^{2})

Geography
- Location within Idaho Location within the United States
- Country: United States
- State: Idaho
- Parent range: Rocky Mountains

The Boulder Mountains are part of the Rocky Mountains in the western United States. Located in central Idaho, they stretch from a few miles north of Ketchum to north to near Challis, and part of the range is within the Sawtooth National Recreation Area (SNRA) and partially within the Hemingway–Boulders Wilderness. The highest point in the range is Ryan Peak, at 11,714 feet (3,570 m) above sea level.

During the summer, popular hiking destinations include the many trails in the southern section of the Boulder Mountains, where many of the highest peaks are located. The front of the Boulders are close to and clearly visible from State Highway 75, the Sawtooth Scenic Byway. Here along the Big Wood River, forests exist along the base of the mountains, while the northern extent of the range has much more sagebrush.

Part of the 1985 movie Pale Rider was filmed in the Boulder Mountains in autumn 1984.

== Peaks ==
The ten highest peaks of the Boulder Mountains
| Mountain Peak | Elevation | Prominence | Isolation | Location | Easiest Route |
|---|---|---|---|---|---|
| Ryan Peak | 11,713 ft 3570 m | 3,192 ft 973 m | 12.9 mi 20.8 km | 43.902351°N 114.409576°W | Class 2 |
| Kent Peak | 11,663 ft 3555 m | 584 ft 178 m | 0.92 mi 1.48 km | 43.891385°N 114.399216°W | Class 2 |
| Glassford Peak | 11,601 ft 3536 m | 1,762 ft 537 m | 3.64 mi 5.85 km | 43.912326°N 114.481081°W | Class 2 |
| Peak 11,458 | 11,457 ft 3492 m | 417 ft 127 m | 1.64 mi 2.64 km | 43.934555°N 114.492797°W | Class 3 |
| Peak 11,313 | 11,312 ft 3448 m | 991 ft 302 m | 2.09 mi 3.37 km | 43.894711°N 114.515174°W | unknown |
| Peak 11,298 | 11,299 ft 3444 m | 259 ft 79 m | 0.84 mi 1.35 km | 43.882657°N 114.513287°W | unknown |
| Peak 11,240 | 11,240 ft 3426 m | 761 ft 232 m | 3.46 mi 5.57 km | 43.844058°N 114.557492°W | unknown |
| Peak 11,192 | 11,191 ft 3411 m | 390 ft 119 m | 0.75 mi 1.2 km | 43.884181°N 114.388055°W | unknown |
| Peak 11,161 | 11,161 ft 3402 m | 322 ft 98 m | 0.63 mi 1.01 km | 43.874513°N 114.518972°W | unknown |
| Cerro Ciento | 11,155 ft 3400 m | 554 ft 169 m | 1.9 mi 3.05 km | 43.863989°N 114.583518°W | Class 2 |

== Lakes ==
Named lakes of the Boulder Mountains
| Lake | Elevation | Max. length | Max. width | Location | Primary Outflow |
|---|---|---|---|---|---|
| Big Fall Creek Lake | 2,767 m (9,078 ft) | 165 m (541 ft) | 097 m (318 ft) | 43.873874°N 114.247350°W | Big Fall Creek |
| Governor's Punch Bowl | 2,638 m (8,655 ft) | 038 m (125 ft) | 026 m (85 ft) | 43.898219°N 114.700783°W | Horse Creek |
| Lower Deer Lake | 2,900 m (9,500 ft) | 178 m (584 ft) | 108 m (354 ft) | 43.942271°N 114.632206°W | Deer Creek |
| North Amber Lake | 2,756 m (9,042 ft) | 106 m (348 ft) | 064 m (210 ft) | 43.841601°N 114.473922°W | West Fork Big Wood River |
| North Fork Lake | 2,848 m (9,344 ft) | 375 m (1,230 ft) | 118 m (387 ft) | 43.912663°N 114.397509°W | North Fork Big Lost River |
| Silver Lake | 2,950 m (9,680 ft) | 163 m (535 ft) | 100 m (330 ft) | 43.838712°N 114.548920°W | Silver Creek |
| South Amber Lake | 2,790 m (9,150 ft) | 170 m (560 ft) | 064 m (210 ft) | 43.836524°N 114.473756°W | West Fork Big Wood River |
| Upper Deer Lake | 2,931 m (9,616 ft) | 332 m (1,089 ft) | 161 m (528 ft) | 43.938783°N 114.629190°W | Deer Creek |
| Window Lake | 3,059 m (10,036 ft) | 173 m (568 ft) | 158 m (518 ft) | 43.855139°N 114.509255°W | West Fork Big Wood River |

== Gallery ==
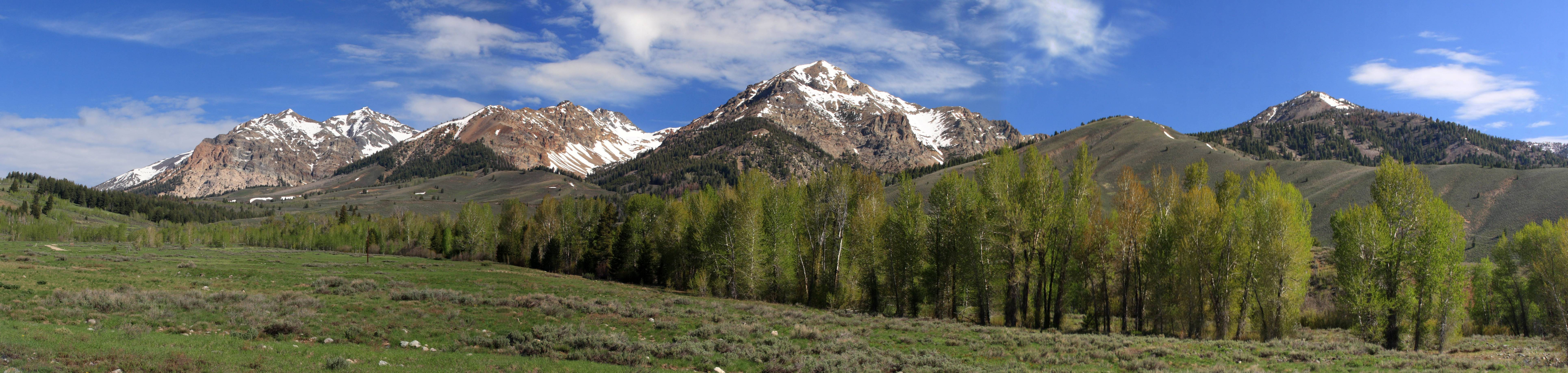
Boulder Mountains from Highway 75. Boulder Peak centered

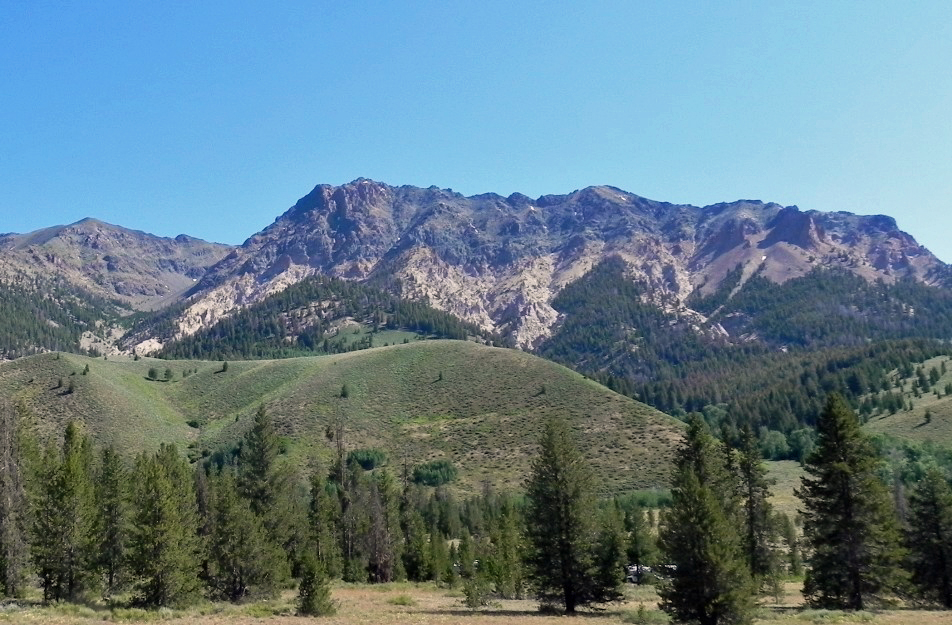
Boulder Mountains

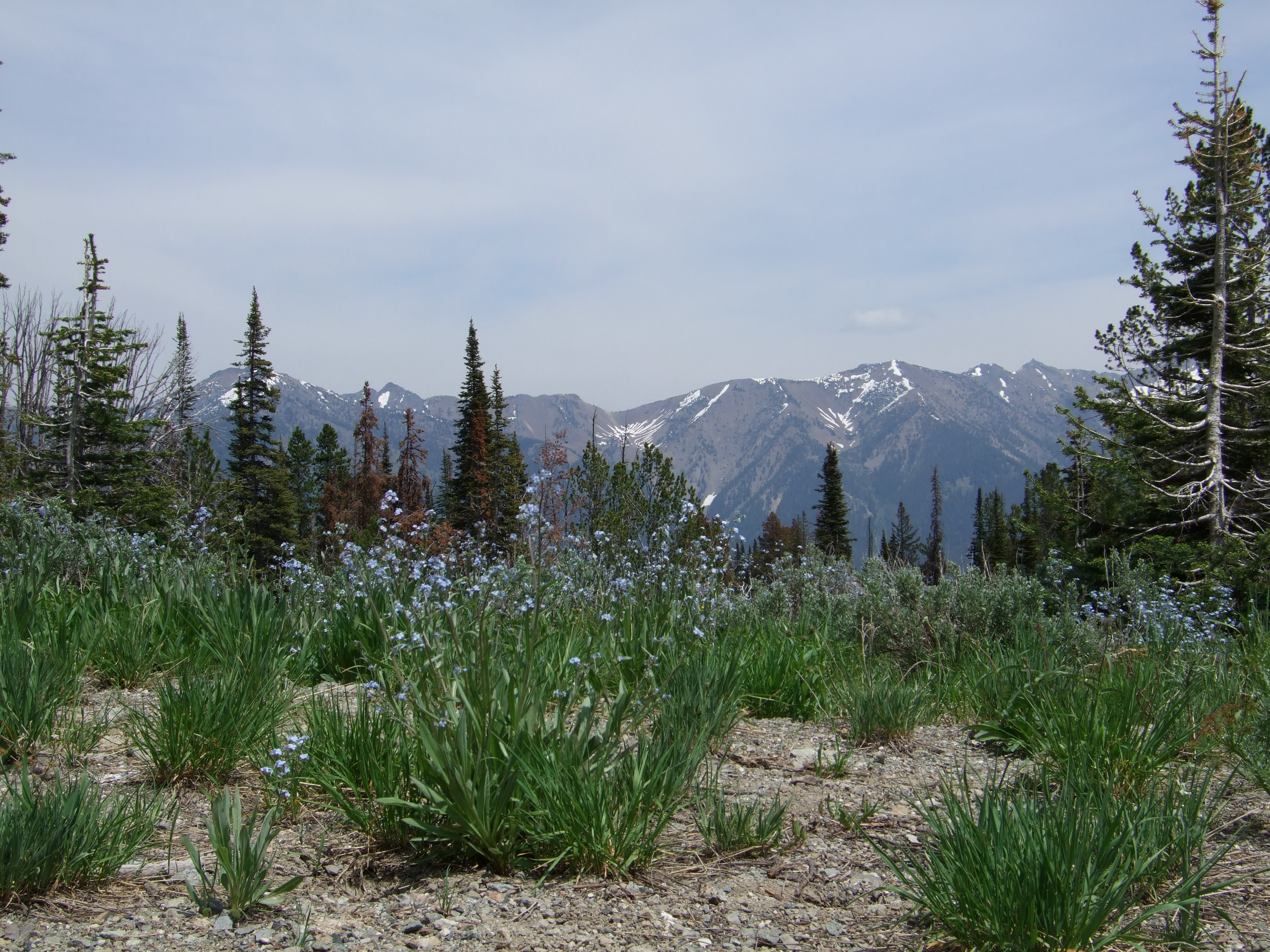
Boulder Mountains from Galena Summit

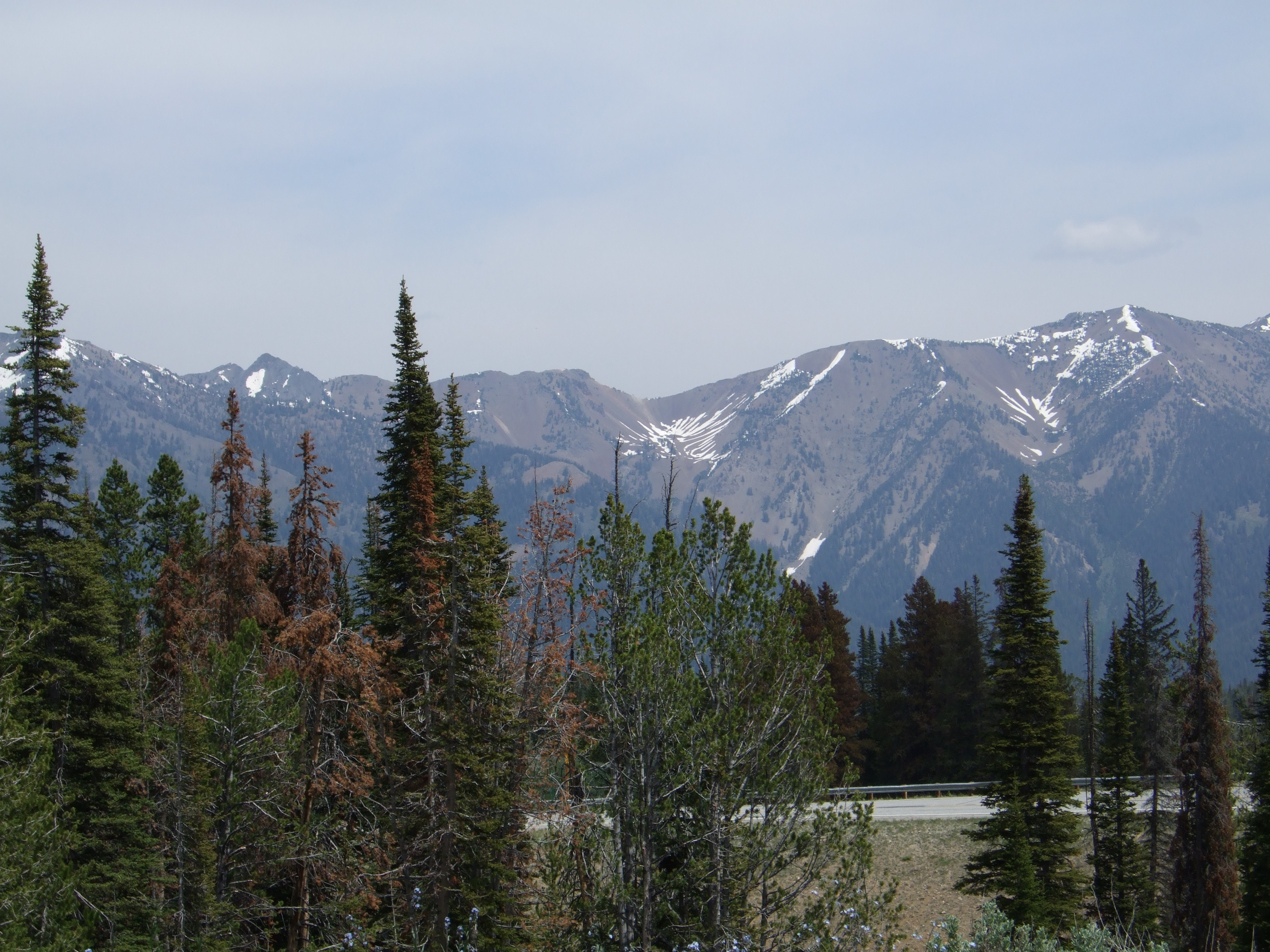
Boulder Mountains from Galena Summit

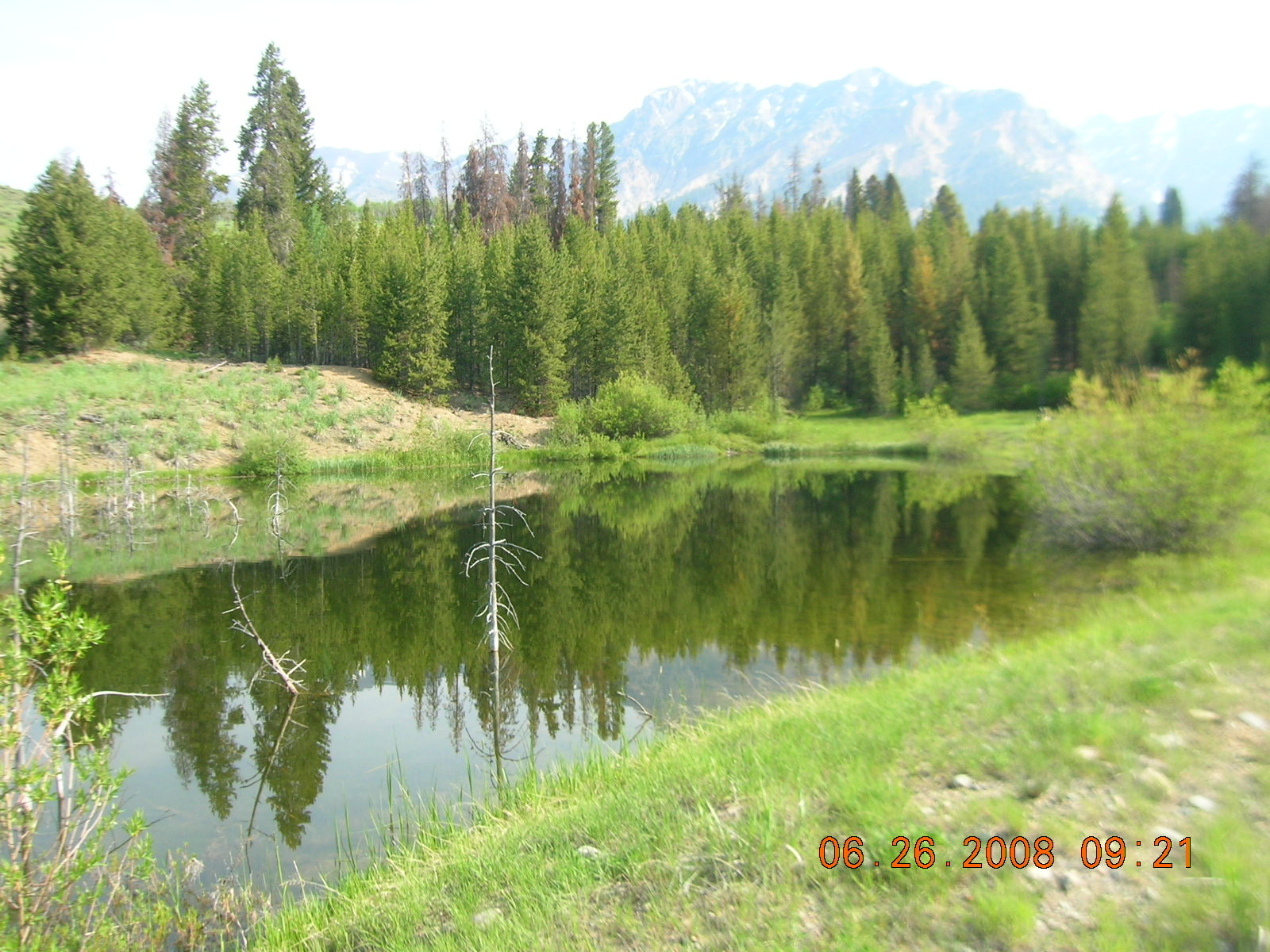
Pond below the Boulder Mountains

== See also ==
- Sawtooth National Recreation Area
- Sawtooth National Forest
