= Hemingway–Boulders Wilderness =

Protected area in the US state of Idaho

- IUCN category Ib (wilderness area)
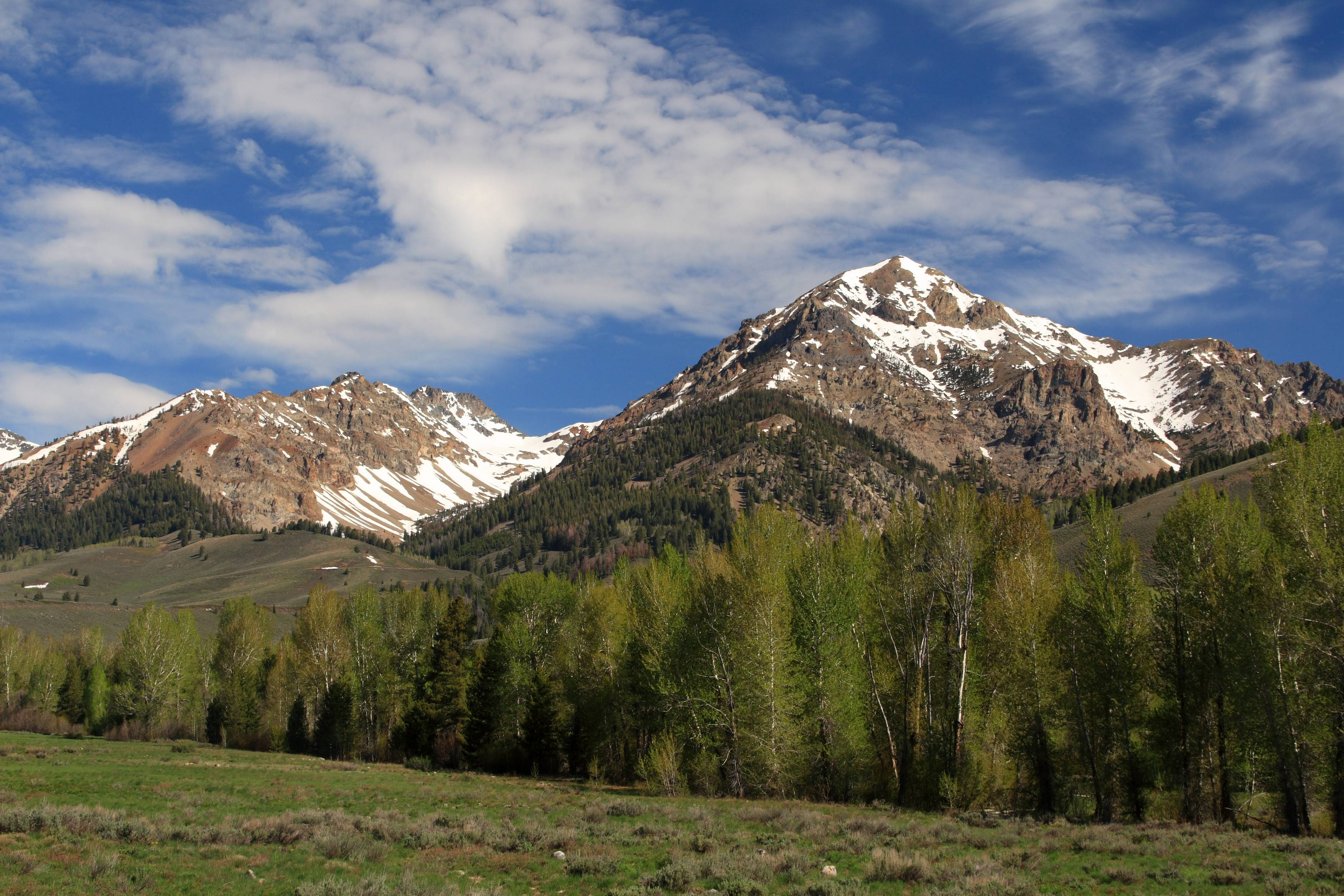
- Boulder Mountains

- Location within the United States Location within Idaho
- Location: Blaine and Custer counties, Idaho, United States
- Nearest city: Ketchum
- Coordinates: 43.909°N 114.485°W
- Area: 67,998 acres (106 sq mi; 275 km^{2})
- Established: August 7, 2015
- Governing body: U.S. Forest Service

The Hemingway–Boulders Wilderness is a protected area in the western United States, located in the Sawtooth National Recreation Area in central Idaho. Part of the Sawtooth National Forest in Blaine and Custer counties, the 67,998-acre (106.2 sq mi; 275.2 km^{2}) wilderness covers part of the Boulder Mountains and directly adjoins the Jim McClure–Jerry Peak Wilderness on its northeast side and is south of the Cecil D. Andrus–White Clouds Wilderness, which it does not directly adjoin.

It is named for the Boulder Mountains and writer Ernest Hemingway, who was a resident of nearby Ketchum. The area was added to the National Wilderness Preservation System on August 7, 2015, with the passage of the Sawtooth National Recreation Area and Jerry Peak Wilderness Additions Act (Pub. L. 114–46 (text) (PDF)); sponsored by Representative Mike Simpson, it passed Congress without objection and was signed into law by President Barack Obama.
