= White Cloud Peak 1 =

Mountain in the state of Idaho

- Location within Idaho

Highest point
- Elevation: 10,353 ft (3,156 m)
- Prominence: 453 ft (138 m)
- Parent peak: White Cloud Peak 3
- Coordinates: 44°10′07″N 114°39′28″W

Geography
- Location: Custer County, Idaho, U.S.
- Parent range: White Cloud Mountains
- Topo map: USGS Robinson Bar

Climbing
- Easiest route: Simple scrambling, class 2

White Cloud Peak 1, also known as WCP 1, at 10,353 feet (3,156 m) above sea level is an unofficially named peak in the White Cloud Mountains of Idaho. The peak is located in Sawtooth National Recreation Area in Custer County 0.88 mi (1.42 km) from White Cloud Peak 3, its line parent. Hoodoo Lake is west of the peak.
