= White Cloud Peak 9 =

Mountain in the state of Idaho

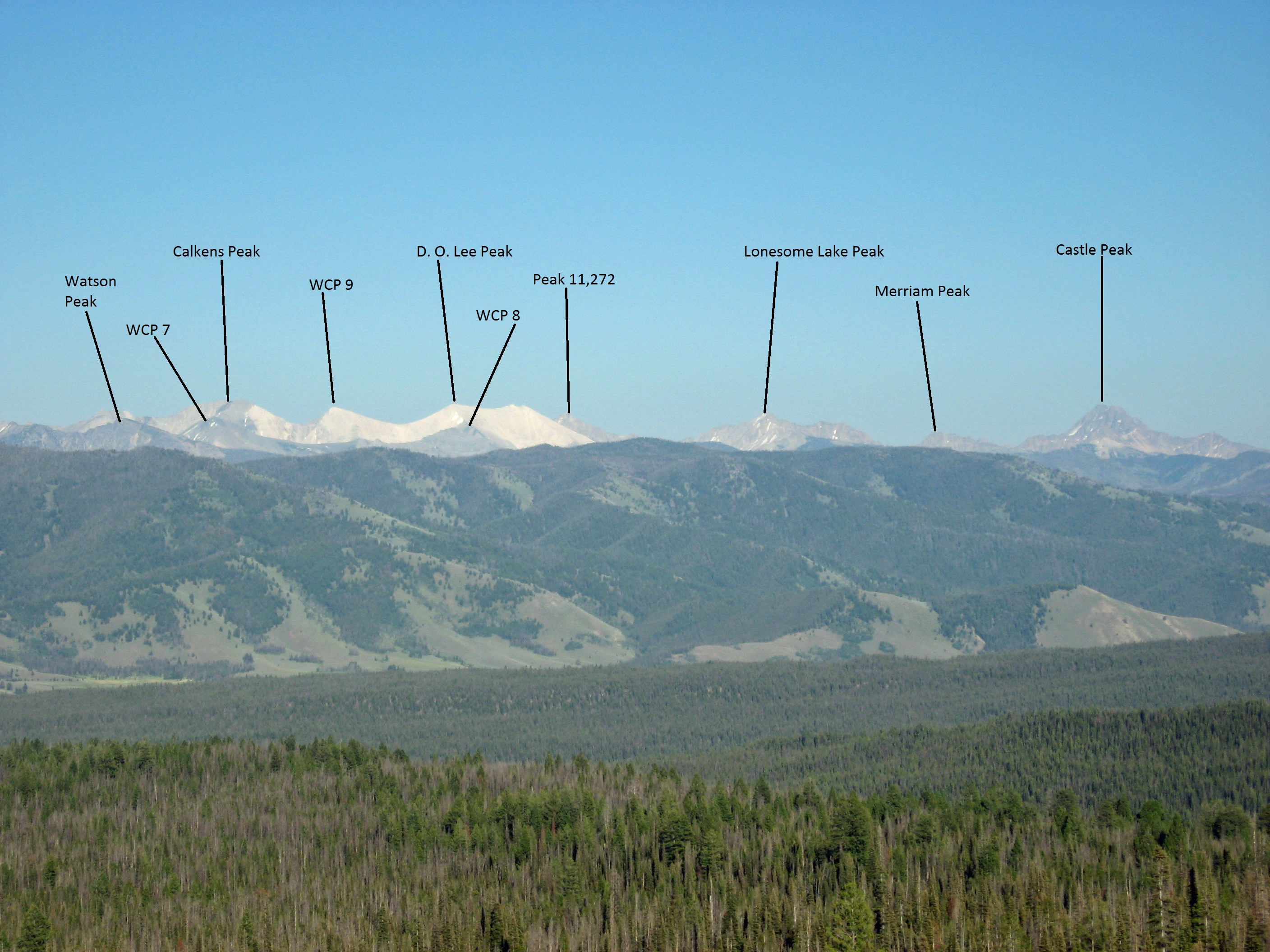
- White Cloud Peak 9 at left

Highest point
- Elevation: 11,263 ft (3,433 m)
- Prominence: 463 ft (141 m)
- Parent peak: Calkins Peak
- Coordinates: 44°06′41″N 114°37′36″W

Geography
- Location within Idaho
- Location: Custer County, Idaho, U.S.
- Parent range: White Cloud Mountains
- Topo map: USGS Washington Peak

Climbing
- Easiest route: Simple scrambling, class 2

White Cloud Peak 9, also known as WCP 9, at 11,263 feet (3,433 m) above sea level is an unofficially named peak in the White Cloud Mountains of Idaho. There are many signature peaks in the White Cloud Mountains that are very obscure and rarely visited. The peak is located in Sawtooth National Recreation Area in Custer County 0.50 mi (0.80 km) south of Calkins Peak, its line parent. It is the 70th highest peak in Idaho and about 0.6 mi (0.97 km) north of D. O. Lee Peak. Cirque Lake is directly southeast of the peak, and Slide Lake is directly northeast of the peak.
