= White Cloud Peak 2 =

Mountain in the state of Idaho

- Location within Idaho

Highest point
- Elevation: 10,271 ft (3,131 m)
- Prominence: 491 ft (150 m)
- Parent peak: White Cloud Peak 3
- Coordinates: 44°09′31″N 114°40′32″W

Geography
- Location: Custer County, Idaho, U.S.
- Parent range: White Cloud Mountains
- Topo map: USGS Robinson Bar

Climbing
- Easiest route: Scrambling, class 3

White Cloud Peak 2, also known as WCP 2, at 10,271 feet (3,131 m) above sea level is an unofficially named peak in the White Cloud Mountains of Idaho. The peak is located in Sawtooth National Recreation Area in Custer County 0.81 mi (1.30 km) from White Cloud Peak 3, its line parent. Swimm Lake is southeast of the peak.
