= Bible Back Mountain (Idaho) =

Mountain in Idaho, United States

- Location within Idaho

Highest point
- Elevation: 9,928 ft (3,026 m)
- Prominence: 428 ft (130 m)
- Parent peak: Croseus Peak
- Coordinates: 43°59′52″N 114°38′16″W

Geography
- Location: Custer County, Idaho, U.S.
- Parent range: White Cloud Mountains
- Topo map: USGS Horton Peak

Bible Back Mountain at 9,928 feet (3,026 m) above sea level is a peak in the White Cloud Mountains of Idaho. The peak is located in Sawtooth National Recreation Area in Custer County east of Croseus Peak, its line parent.
