= White Cloud Peak 8 =

Mountain in Idaho, United States

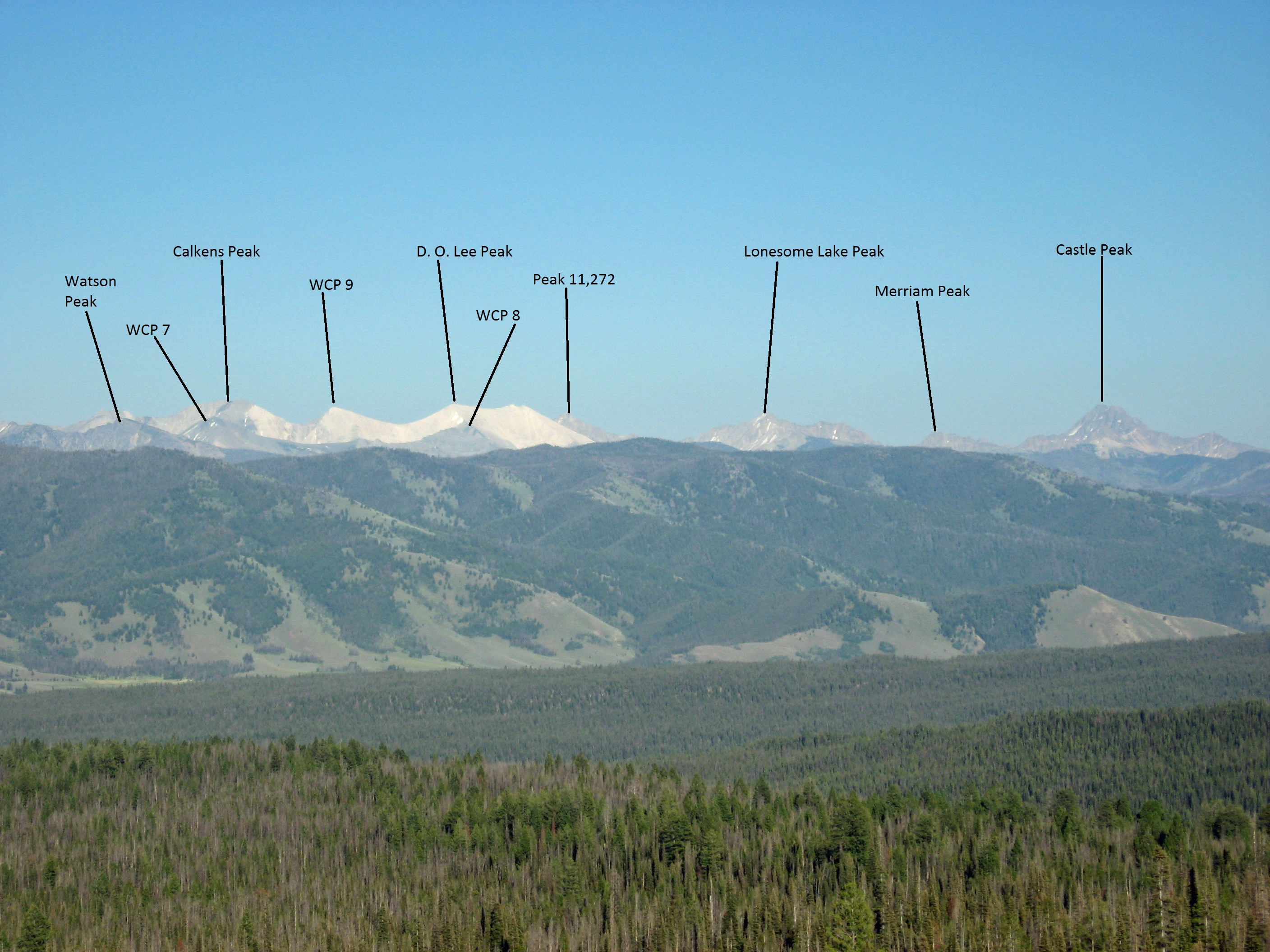
- White Cloud Peak 8 at left

Highest point
- Elevation: 10,557 ft (3,218 m)
- Prominence: 437 ft (133 m)
- Parent peak: D. O. Lee Peak
- Coordinates: 44°06′19″N 114°38′50″W

Geography
- Location within Idaho
- Location: Custer County, Idaho, U.S.
- Parent range: White Cloud Mountains
- Topo map: USGS Washington Peak

Climbing
- Easiest route: Scrambling, class 3

White Cloud Peak 8, also known as WCP 8, at 10,557 feet (3,218 m) above sea level is an unofficially named peak in the White Cloud Mountains of Idaho. The peak is located in Sawtooth National Recreation Area in Custer County 0.94 mi (1.51 km) west of D. O. Lee Peak, its line parent.
