= White Cloud Peak 4 =

Mountain in the state of Idaho

- Location within Idaho

Highest point
- Elevation: 10,450 ft (3,190 m)
- Prominence: 370 ft (110 m)
- Parent peak: Watson Peak
- Coordinates: 44°08′20″N 114°40′40″W

Geography
- Location: Custer County, Idaho, U.S.
- Parent range: White Cloud Mountains
- Topo map: USGS Robinson Bar

Climbing
- Easiest route: Scrambling, class 3

White Cloud Peak 4, also known as WCP 4, at 10,450 feet (3,190 m) above sea level is an unofficially named peak in the White Cloud Mountains of Idaho. The peak is located in Sawtooth National Recreation Area in Custer County 0.68 mi (1.09 km) northeast of Watson Peak, its line parent. Swimm Lake is northeast of the peak.
