= Blackmon Peak =

Mountain in Idaho, United States

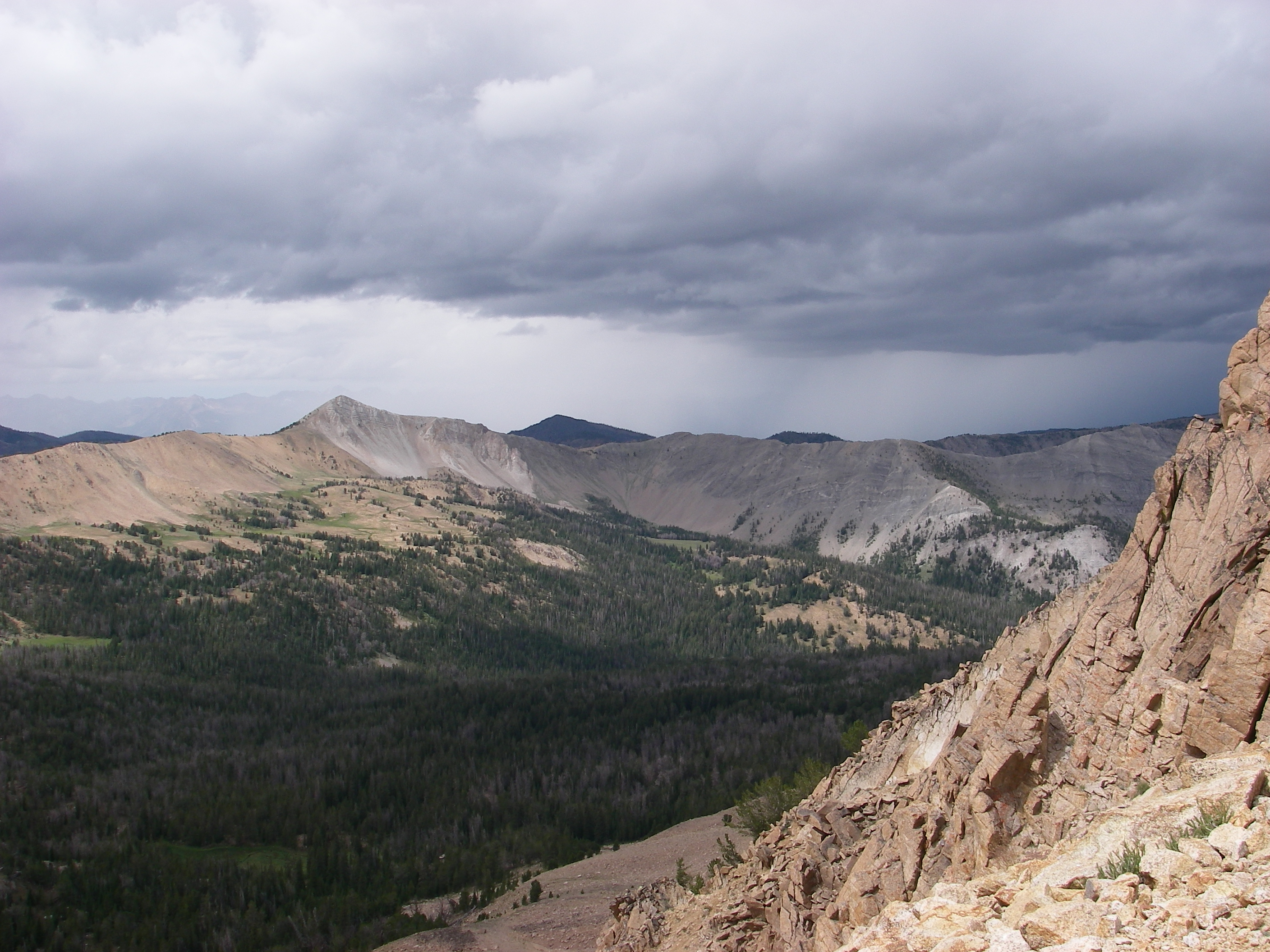
- The light colored peak on the distant ridge.

Highest point
- Elevation: 10,302 ft (3,140 m)
- Prominence: 400 ft (120 m)
- Parent peak: Castle Peak
- Coordinates: 44°03′29″N 114°39′09″W

Geography
- Location within Idaho
- Location: Custer County, Idaho, U.S.
- Parent range: White Cloud Mountains
- Topo map: USGS Washington Peak

Climbing
- Easiest route: Simple scrambling, class 2

Blackmon Peak, also known as Blackman Peak, at 10,302 feet (3,140 m) above sea level is a peak in the White Cloud Mountains of Idaho. The peak is located in Sawtooth National Recreation Area in Custer County 2.11 mi (3.40 km) from Castle Peak, its line parent. It is named for George Blackmon (b.1854), freed slave and mining pioneer.

== See also ==
- D. O. Lee Peak
- Born Lakes
- Chamberlain Basin
- List of lakes of the White Cloud Mountains
