= Peak 11,272 (White Cloud Mountains) =

Mountain in Idaho, United States

- Location within Idaho

Highest point
- Elevation: 11,272 ft (3,436 m) NGVD 29
- Prominence: 672 ft (205 m)
- Parent peak: D. O. Lee Peak
- Coordinates: 44°05′29″N 114°36′33″W

Geography
- Location: Custer County, Idaho, U.S.
- Parent range: White Cloud Mountains
- Topo map: USGS Boulder Chain Lakes

Climbing
- Easiest route: Scramble, class 3

Peak 11,272, at 11,272 feet (3,436 m), is the officially unnamed fifth-highest peak of the White Cloud Mountains of the U.S. state of Idaho. The peak is located in Sawtooth National Recreation Area in Custer County 1.25 mi (2.01 km) southeast of D. O. Lee Peak, its line parent. The Big Boulder Lakes are located north of the peak.
