= Lookout Mountain (Idaho) =

Mountain in Custer County, Idaho, United States

- Location within Idaho

Highest point
- Elevation: 9,954 ft (3,034 m)
- Prominence: 1,854 ft (565 m)
- Parent peak: Blackmon Peak
- Coordinates: 44°11′34″N 114°45′31″W

Geography
- Location: Custer County, Idaho, U.S.
- Parent range: White Cloud Mountains
- Topo map: USGS Washington Peak

Climbing
- Easiest route: Hiking, class 1

Lookout Mountain at 9,954 feet (3,034 m) above sea level is a peak in the White Cloud Mountains of Idaho. The peak is located in Sawtooth National Recreation Area in Custer County 4.72 mi (7.60 km) from Blackmon Peak, its line parent. A maintained trail goes to the summit where an old U.S. Forest Service fire lookout is located. The lookout was built by the Civilian Conservation Corps and was recently refurbished.
