= Fourth of July Peak =

Mountain in Idaho, United States

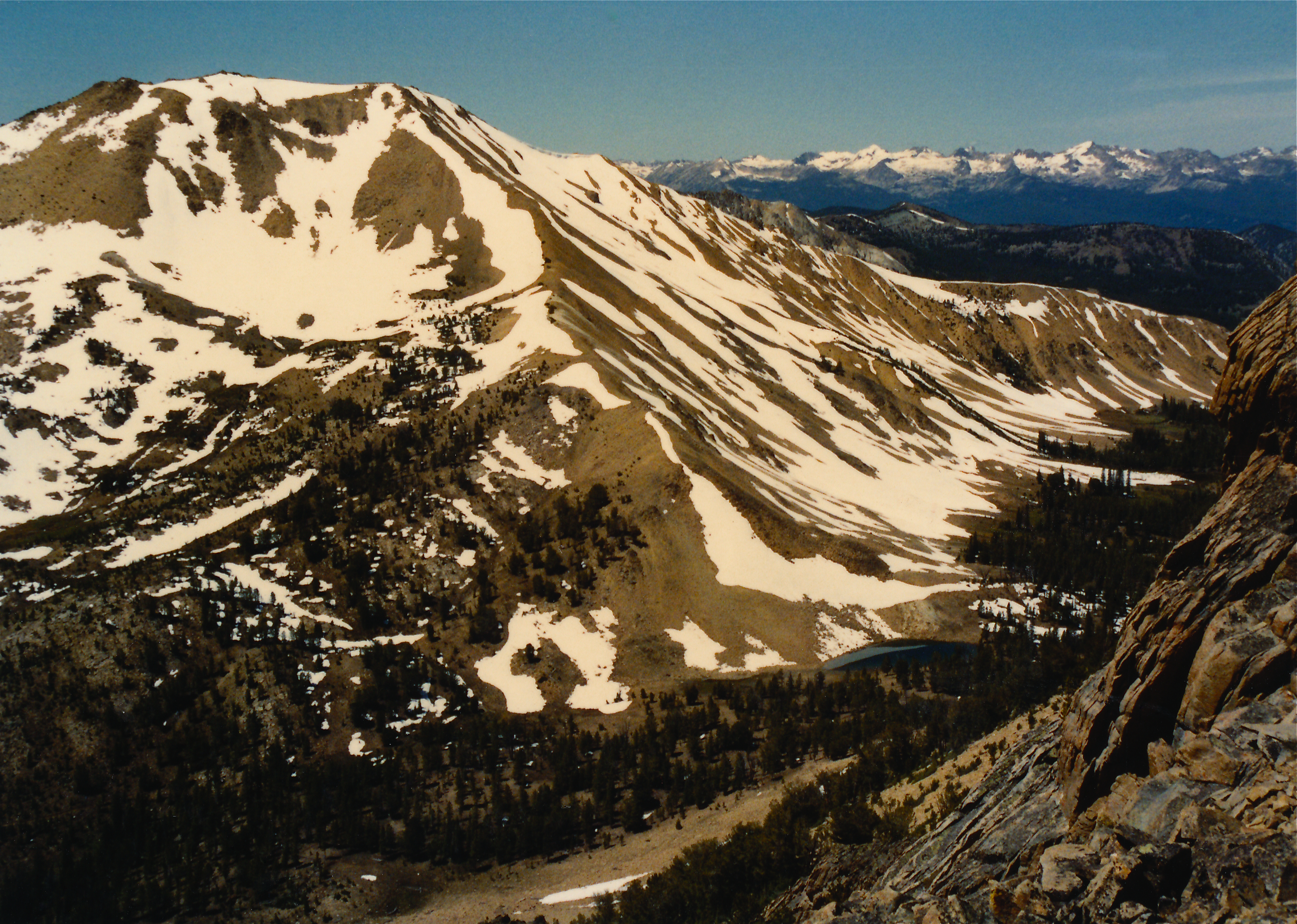
- Fourth of July Peak at left

Highest point
- Elevation: 10,713 ft (3,265 m)
- Prominence: 1,133 ft (345 m)
- Parent peak: Castle Peak
- Coordinates: 44°01′48″N 114°38′06″W

Geography
- Location within Idaho
- Location: Custer County, Idaho, U.S.
- Parent range: White Cloud Mountains
- Topo map: USGS Washington Peak

Climbing
- Easiest route: Simple scrambling, class 2

Fourth of July Peak at 10,713 feet (3,265 m) above sea level is a peak in the White Cloud Mountains of Idaho. The peak is located in Sawtooth National Recreation Area in Custer County 2.54 mi (4.09 km) from Castle Peak, its line parent. It is the 201st highest peak in Idaho and rises to the west of Fourth of July and Washington lakes.
