= Born Lakes =

Chain of lakes in the state of Idaho

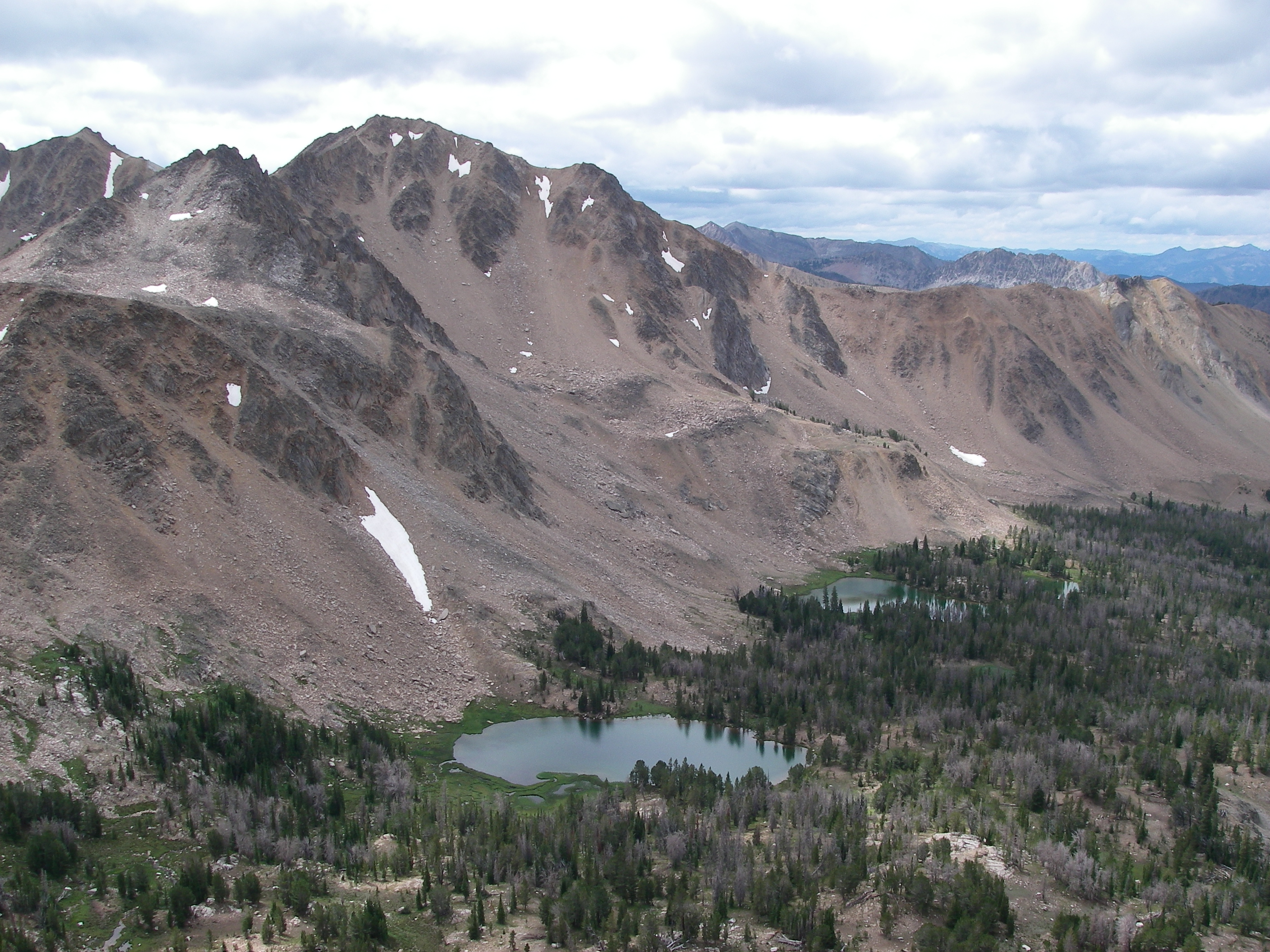

- Location within Idaho
- Location: Custer County, Idaho
- Coordinates: 44.0591032°N 114.6169483°W
- Lake type: Glacial
- Primary outflows: Warm Springs Creek to Salmon River
- Basin countries: United States
- Surface elevation: 9,465 ft (2,885 m)

The Born Lakes are a chain of eleven alpine and glacial Paternoster lakes in Custer County, Idaho, United States, located in the White Cloud Mountains in the Sawtooth National Recreation Area. The lakes are located on the upper portion of the Warm Springs Creek watershed, a tributary of the Salmon River. The Born Lakes surrounded by Patterson, Blackmon, and Lonesome Lake Peaks. Sawtooth National Forest trail 671 leads to the lakes. The individual lakes do have official names, and many of them have partially or nearly completely filled in with sediment.

Born Lakes
Lake	Elevation	Max. length	Max. width	Location
Born Lake 1	2,815 m (9,236 ft)	028 m (92 ft)	023 m (75 ft)	44.057964°N 114.630997°W
Born Lake 2	2,854 m (9,364 ft)	133 m (436 ft)	095 m (312 ft)	44.062392°N 114.619017°W
Born Lake 3	2,866 m (9,403 ft)	040 m (130 ft)	025 m (82 ft)	44.058314°N 114.622474°W
Born Lake 4	2,866 m (9,403 ft)	058 m (190 ft)	034 m (112 ft)	44.057888°N 114.622971°W
Born Lake 5	2,873 m (9,426 ft)	150 m (490 ft)	073 m (240 ft)	44.057748°N 114.620014°W
Born Lake 6	2,877 m (9,439 ft)	168 m (551 ft)	120 m (390 ft)	44.057371°N 114.618033°W
Born Lake 7	2,880 m (9,450 ft)	046 m (151 ft)	030 m (98 ft)	44.059298°N 114.618471°W
Born Lake 8	2,889 m (9,478 ft)	055 m (180 ft)	038 m (125 ft)	44.059298°N 114.616706°W
Born Lake 9	2,912 m (9,554 ft)	174 m (571 ft)	100 m (330 ft)	44.059479°N 114.612707°W
Born Lake 10	2,953 m (9,688 ft)	026 m (85 ft)	022 m (72 ft)	44.060983°N 114.608799°W
Born Lake 11	2,963 m (9,721 ft)	103 m (338 ft)	041 m (135 ft)	44.062114°N 114.610983°W

== Proper name ==
The Born Lakes have been known by various names including: Boone Lakes, Born lakes, and Boorn Lakes. In 1964, the United States Board on Geographical Names proposed that the name "Born Lakes" should be established as the official name. However, in 2009, James Ridenour of Spokane Valley, Washington, submitted a proposal to correct the spelling of "Born Lakes" to "Boorn Lakes", to restore the spelling that appeared on early Federal maps and to properly recognize the intended honoree — Samuel S. Boorn (ca.1840-ca.1900), who staked the first mining claim in Custer County. The name "Boorn Lakes" became official in August 2009. Despite this official name change, the name "Born Lakes" continues to appear on most maps of the region.

== See also ==
- List of lakes of the White Cloud Mountains
- Chamberlain Basin
- D. O. Lee Peak
- Sawtooth National Forest
- Sawtooth National Recreation Area
- White Cloud Mountains
