= Ebony Peak =

Mountain in Idaho, United States

- Location within Idaho

Highest point
- Elevation: 10,514 ft (3,205 m)
- Prominence: 334 ft (102 m)
- Parent peak: Washington Peak
- Coordinates: 44°01′04″N 114°39′15″W

Geography
- Location: Custer County, Idaho, U.S.
- Parent range: White Cloud Mountains
- Topo map: USGS Washington Peak

Climbing
- Easiest route: Scrambling, class 3

Ebony Peak at 10,514 feet (3,205 m) above sea level is an unofficially named peak in the White Cloud Mountains of Idaho. The peak is located in Sawtooth National Recreation Area in Custer County 1.13 mi (1.82 km) from Washington Peak, its line parent. It is the 265th highest peak in Idaho.
