= White Cloud Peak 10 =

Mountain in the US state of Idaho

- Location within Idaho

Highest point
- Elevation: 11,102 ft (3,384 m)
- Prominence: 342 ft (104 m)
- Parent peak: Calkins Peak
- Coordinates: 44°07′03″N 114°36′36″W

Geography
- Location: Custer County, Idaho, U.S.
- Parent range: White Cloud Mountains
- Topo map: USGS Boulder Chain Lakes

Climbing
- Easiest route: Simple climbing, class 4

White Cloud Peak 10, also known as WCP 10, at 11,102 feet (3,384 m) above sea level is an unofficially named peak in the White Cloud Mountains of Idaho. The peak is located in Sawtooth National Recreation Area in Custer County 0.53 mi (0.85 km) south of Calkins Peak, its line parent. It is the 89th highest peak in Idaho. Sheep Lake is directly south of the peak, and Tin Cup Lake is directly north of the peak.
