= White Cloud Peak 6 =

Mountain in the state of Idaho

- Location within Idaho

Highest point
- Elevation: 10,256 ft (3,126 m)
- Prominence: 296 ft (90 m)
- Parent peak: White Cloud Peak 7
- Coordinates: 44°07′50″N 114°38′52″W

Geography
- Location: Custer County, Idaho, U.S.
- Parent range: White Cloud Mountains
- Topo map: USGS Robinson Bar

Climbing
- Easiest route: Simple scrambling, class 2

White Cloud Peak 6, also known as WCP 6, at 10,256 feet (3,126 m) above sea level is an unofficially named peak in the White Cloud Mountains of Idaho. The peak is located in Sawtooth National Recreation Area in Custer County 0.61 mi (0.98 km) north-northeast of White Cloud Peak 7, its line parent.
