= Lonesome Lake Peak =

Mountain in Idaho, United States

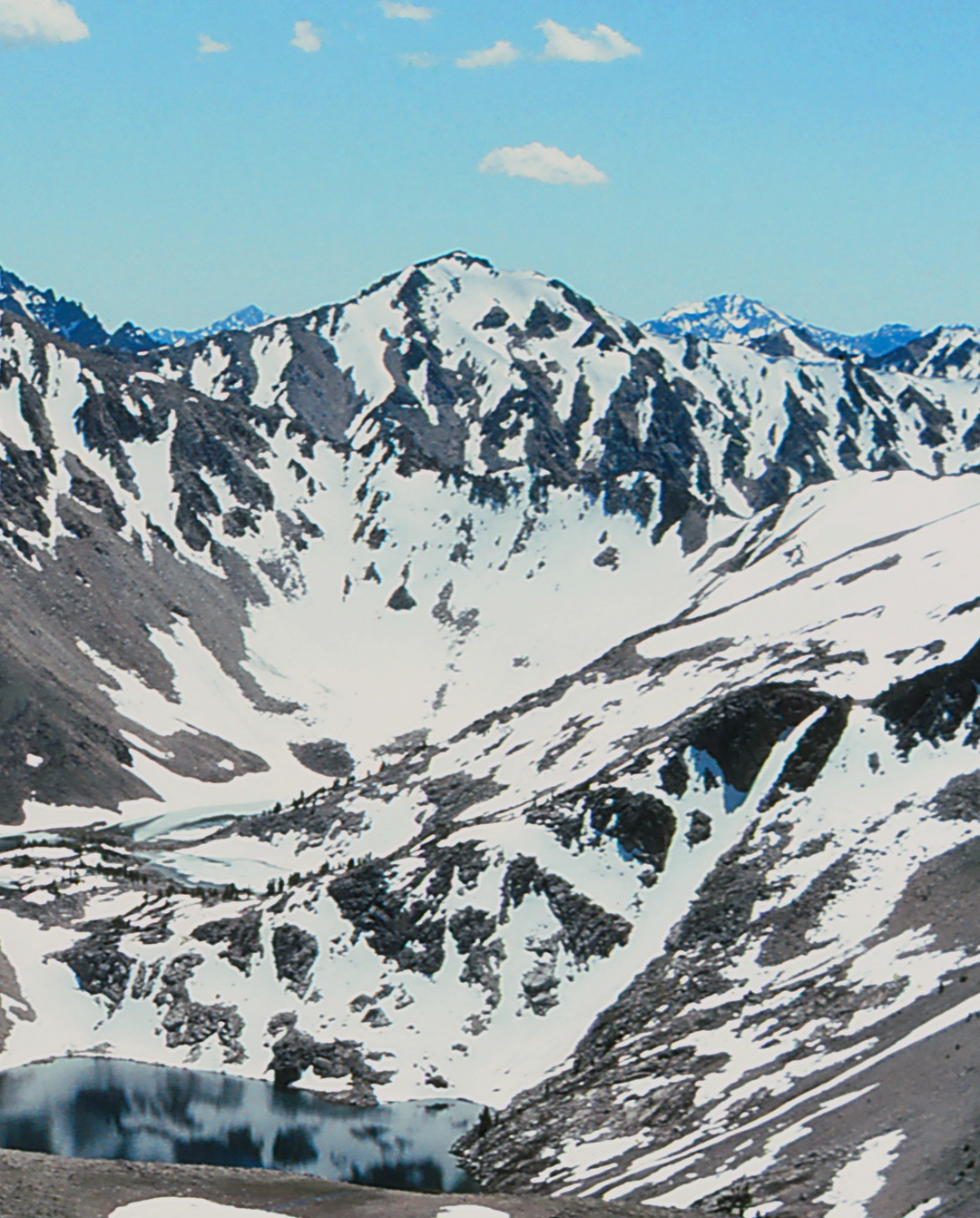
- Lonesome Lake Peak with Sapphire Lake

Highest point
- Elevation: 11,302 ft (3,445 m)
- Prominence: 922 ft (281 m)
- Parent peak: D. O. Lee Peak
- Coordinates: 44°04′31″N 114°36′43″W

Geography
- Location within Idaho
- Location: Custer County, Idaho, U.S.
- Parent range: White Cloud Mountains
- Topo map: USGS Boulder Chain Lakes

Climbing
- Easiest route: Simple scrambling, class 2

Lonesome Lake Peak, also known as Lonesome Peak, at 11,302 feet (3,445 m) above sea level is a peak in the White Cloud Mountains of Idaho. The peak is located in Sawtooth National Recreation Area in Custer County. The peak is located 2.07 mi (3.33 km) south-southeast of D. O. Lee Peak, its line parent. It is the 68th highest peak in Idaho and rises above the west side of Lonesome Lake, the uppermost of the Boulder Chain Lakes.
