= Tristolzer Berg =

Hill in Baden-Württemberg, Germany

Coordinates: 47°59′01″N 9°56′17″E

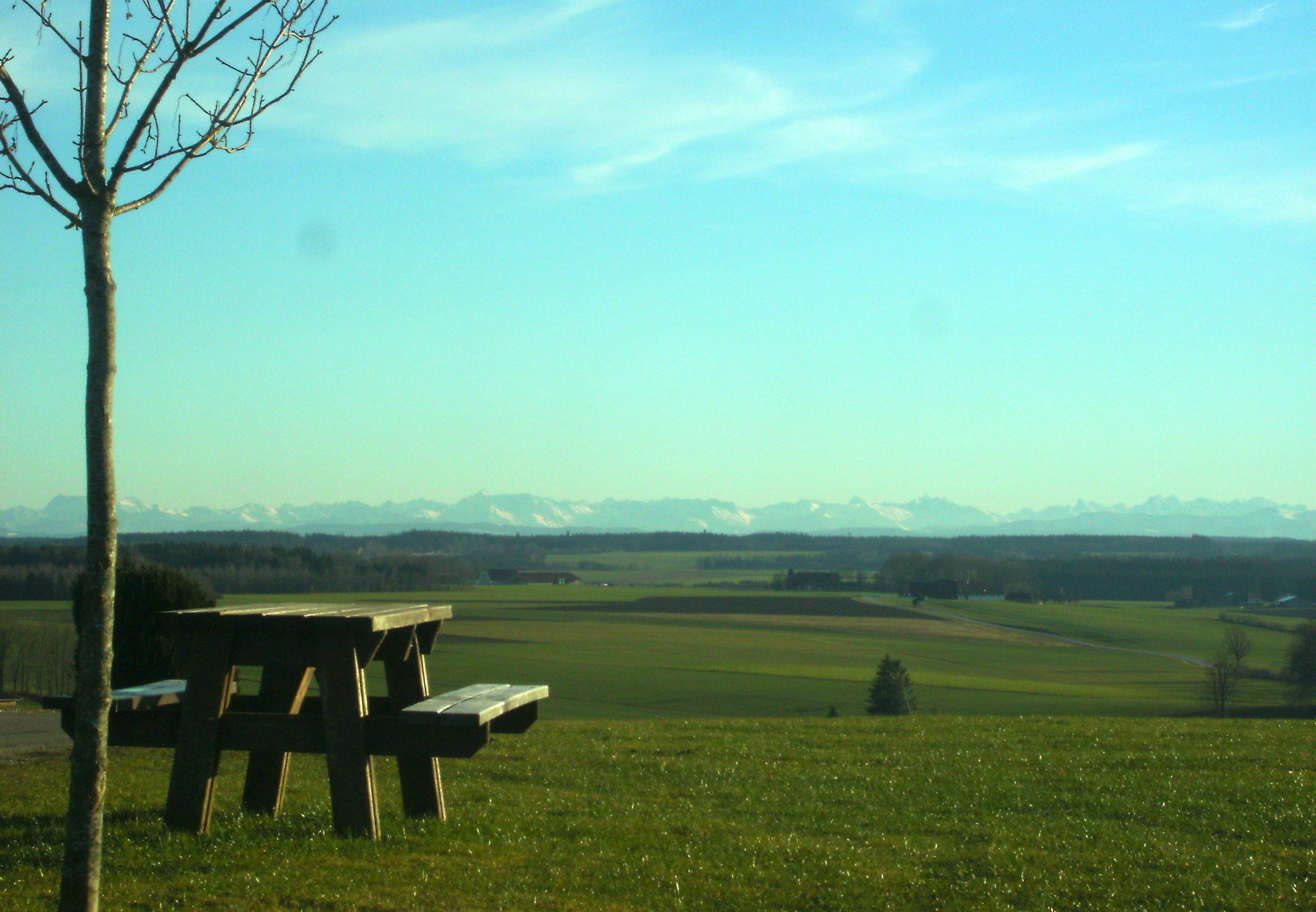
- Tristolzer Berg.

Highest point
- Elevation: 699.9 m (2,296 ft)
- Prominence: 17 m (56 ft)
- Parent peak: P. 745 near Oberschwarzach (line parent)
- Isolation: 1.61 km (1.00 mi)

Geography
- Location: Baden-Württemberg, Germany

Tristolzer Berg is a hill of Baden-Württemberg, Germany.
