= White Cloud Peak 7 =

Mountain in the state of Idaho

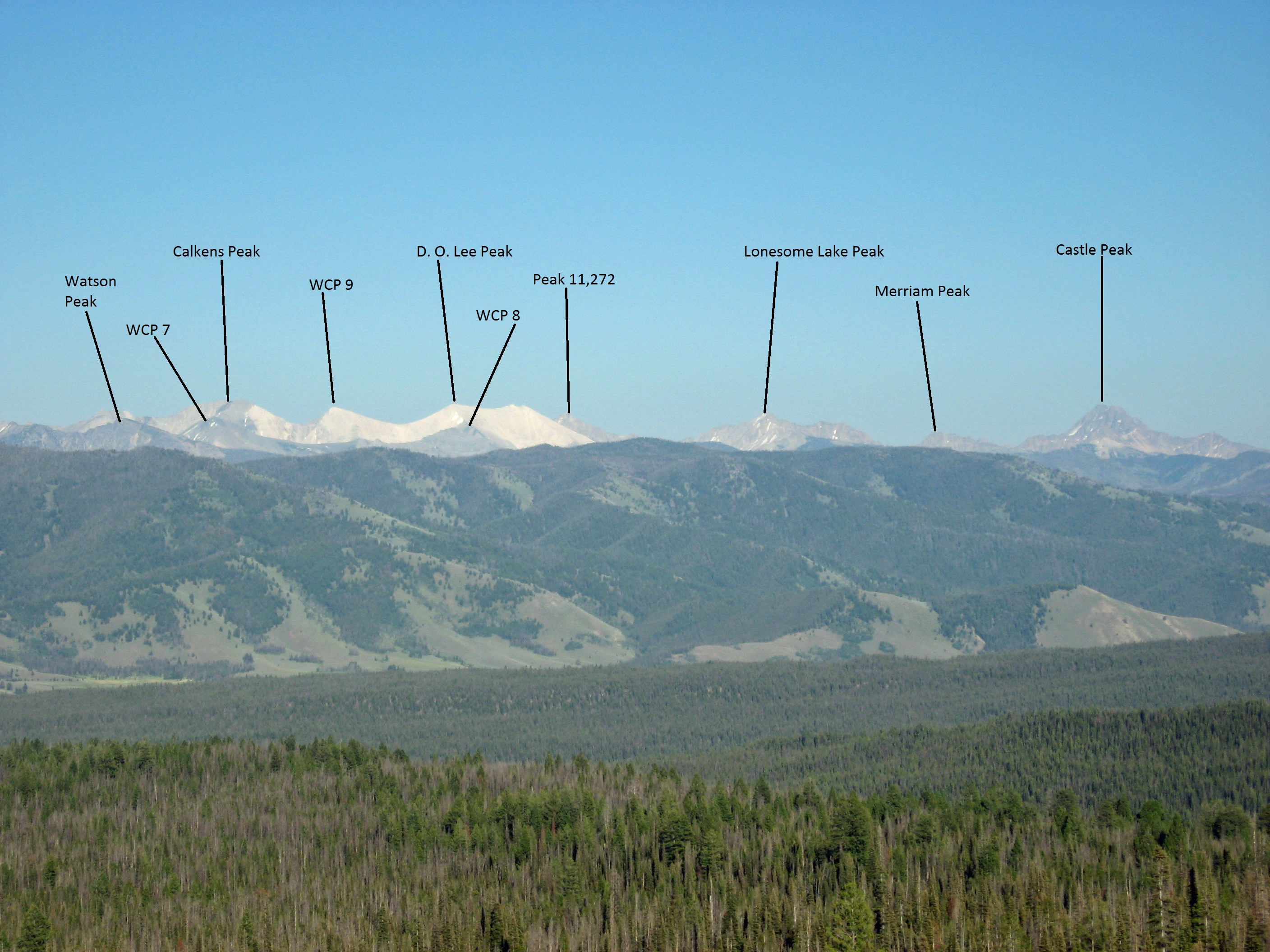
- White Cloud Peak 7 at left

Highest point
- Elevation: 10,777 ft (3,285 m)
- Prominence: 657 ft (200 m)
- Parent peak: White Cloud Peak 9
- Coordinates: 44°07′22″N 114°39′13″W

Geography
- Location within Idaho
- Location: Custer County, Idaho, U.S.
- Parent range: White Cloud Mountains
- Topo map: USGS Washington Peak

Climbing
- Easiest route: Scrambling, class 3

White Cloud Peak 7, also known as WCP 7, at 10,777 feet (3,285 m) above sea level is an unofficially named peak in the White Cloud Mountains of Idaho. The peak is located in Sawtooth National Recreation Area in Custer County 1.56 mi (2.51 km) north-northwest of White Cloud Peak 9, its line parent.
