= Bear Lake (Custer County, Idaho) =

Alpine lake in the state of Idaho

- Location within Idaho Location within the United States
- Location: Custer County, Idaho
- Coordinates: 44°08′16″N 114°41′40″W
- Type: Glacial
- Primary outflows: Bear Lake Creek Warm Springs Creek to Salmon River
- Basin countries: United States
- Max. length: 120 m (390 ft)
- Max. width: 70 m (230 ft)
- Surface elevation: 2,720 m (8,920 ft)

Bear Lake is an alpine lake in Custer County, Idaho, United States, located in the White Cloud Mountains in the Sawtooth National Recreation Area. The lake is accessed from Sawtooth National Forest trail 671 along Warm Springs Creek.

Bear Lake is just north of Watson Peak and west of, but in a different basin from, Swimm Lake.

== See also ==
- List of lakes of the White Cloud Mountains
- Sawtooth National Recreation Area
- White Cloud Mountains
