= Calkins Peak =

Mountain in Idaho, United States

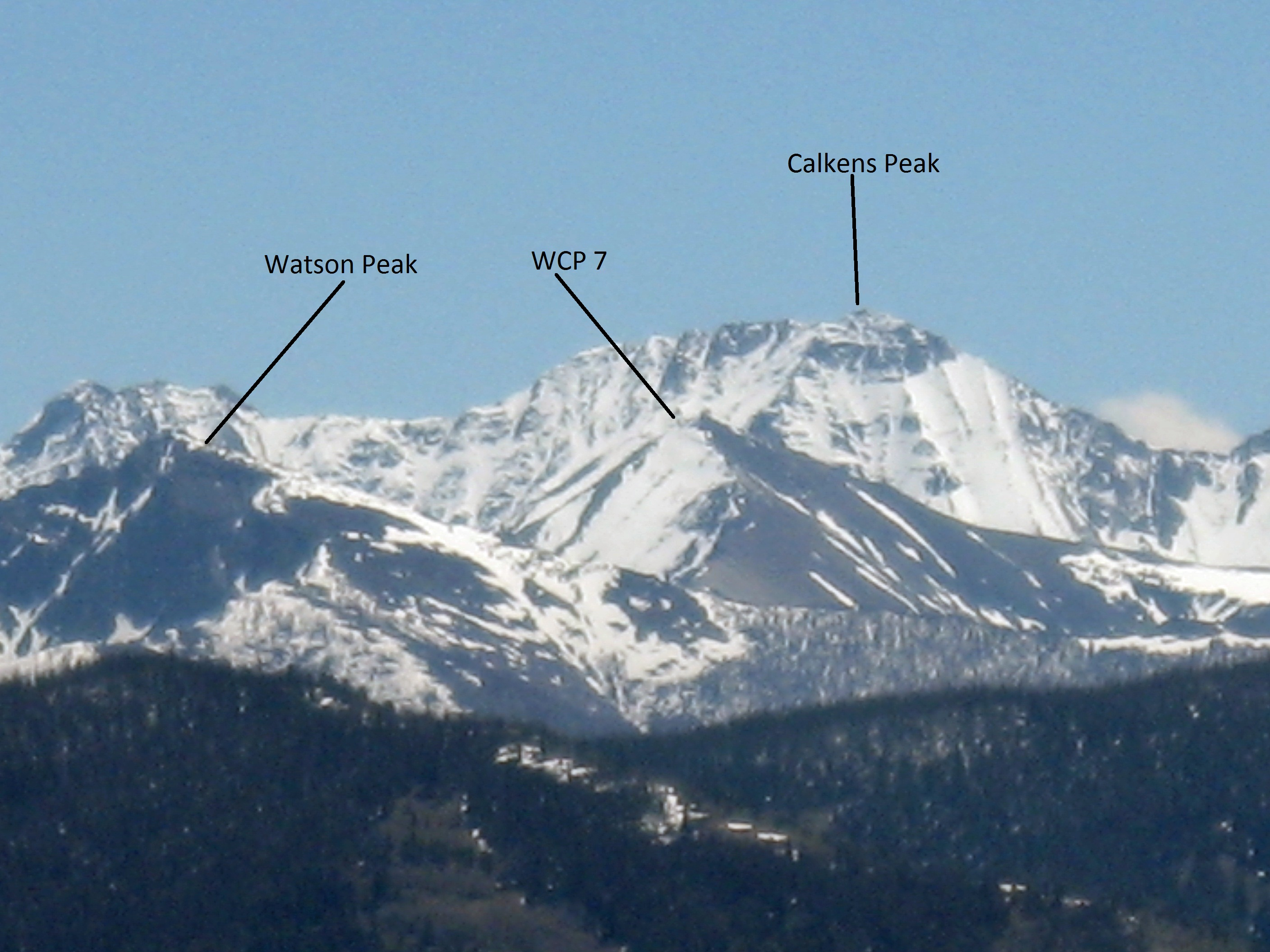
- Calkins Peak from the northwest

Highest point
- Elevation: 11,487 ft (3,501 m)
- Prominence: 1,247 ft (380 m)
- Parent peak: Castle Peak
- Coordinates: 44°07′11″N 114°37′12″W

Geography
- Location within Idaho
- Location: Custer County, Idaho, U.S.
- Parent range: White Cloud Mountains
- Topo map: USGS Boulder Chain Lakes

Climbing
- Easiest route: Scrambling, class 3

Calkins Peak, is a peak also known as Calkens, O'Calkens Peak, Caulkens Peak, and O'Caulkens Peak. At an elevation of 11,487 feet (3,501 m) above sea level it is the second highest peak in the White Cloud Mountains of Idaho. The peak is located in Sawtooth National Recreation Area in Custer County about 5.75 mi (9.25 km) north-northwest of Castle Peak, its line parent. It is the 46th highest peak in Idaho, and it is located about 0.5 mi (0.80 km) north-northeast of White Cloud Peak 9 and 1 mi (1.6 km) north-northwest of D. O. Lee Peak. Calkins Peak is directly north of Slide Lake, northwest of Sheep Lake, and southwest of Tin Cup Lake. Calkins Peak is named for Stephen Calkins (1842–1922), a prospector who established lode claims in the area.

== Climate ==
Climate data for Calkins Peak 44.1162 N, 114.6233 W, Elevation: 10,869 ft (3,313 m) (1991–2020 normals)
Month	Jan	Feb	Mar	Apr	May	Jun	Jul	Aug	Sep	Oct	Nov	Dec	Year
Mean daily maximum °F (°C)	20.8 (−6.2)	20.4 (−6.4)	25.3 (−3.7)	30.7 (−0.7)	40.3 (4.6)	49.5 (9.7)	61.4 (16.3)	61.0 (16.1)	52.1 (11.2)	38.8 (3.8)	25.6 (−3.6)	19.7 (−6.8)	37.1 (2.9)
Daily mean °F (°C)	14.0 (−10.0)	12.6 (−10.8)	16.2 (−8.8)	20.6 (−6.3)	29.5 (−1.4)	38.0 (3.3)	48.6 (9.2)	48.2 (9.0)	39.3 (4.1)	28.4 (−2.0)	18.5 (−7.5)	13.1 (−10.5)	27.3 (−2.6)
Mean daily minimum °F (°C)	7.1 (−13.8)	4.8 (−15.1)	7.0 (−13.9)	10.4 (−12.0)	18.6 (−7.4)	26.4 (−3.1)	35.9 (2.2)	35.4 (1.9)	26.5 (−3.1)	17.9 (−7.8)	11.4 (−11.4)	6.5 (−14.2)	17.3 (−8.1)
Average precipitation inches (mm)	4.67 (119)	4.42 (112)	4.96 (126)	3.69 (94)	3.81 (97)	2.99 (76)	1.15 (29)	1.10 (28)	1.80 (46)	2.87 (73)	3.55 (90)	5.44 (138)	40.45 (1,028)
Source: PRISM Climate Group
