= Croseus Peak =

Peak in the White Cloud Mountains, Idaho, U.S.

- Location within Idaho

Highest point
- Elevation: 10,388 ft (3,166 m)
- Coordinates: 43°59′42″N 114°39′37″W

Geography
- Location: Custer County, Idaho, U.S.
- Parent range: White Cloud Mountains
- Topo map: USGS Horton Peak

Croseus Peak at 10,388 feet (3,166 m) above sea level is a peak in the White Cloud Mountains of Idaho. The peak is located in Sawtooth National Recreation Area in Custer County. Croseus has a second summit at 10,288 ft (3,136 m), which is often marked as the primary and highest summit on maps.
