= Hoodoo Lake =

Lake in Idaho, United States

- Location within Idaho Location within the United States
- Location: Custer County, Idaho
- Coordinates: 44°10′0.8746″N 114°38′31.2050″W
- Lake type: Glacial
- Primary outflows: Slate Creek to Salmon River
- Basin countries: United States
- Max. length: 215 m (705 ft)
- Max. width: 150 m (490 ft)
- Surface elevation: 2,645 m (8,678 ft)

Hoodoo Lake is an alpine lake in Custer County, Idaho, United States, located in the White Cloud Mountains in the Sawtooth National Recreation Area. No trails lead to the lake, but it can be accessed from Sawtooth National Forest road 666.

Hoodoo Lake is upstream and southwest of the Slate Creek Hot Springs.

== See also ==
- List of lakes of the White Cloud Mountains
- Sawtooth National Recreation Area
- White Cloud Mountains
