= Watson Peak (Custer County, Idaho) =

Mountain in Idaho, United States

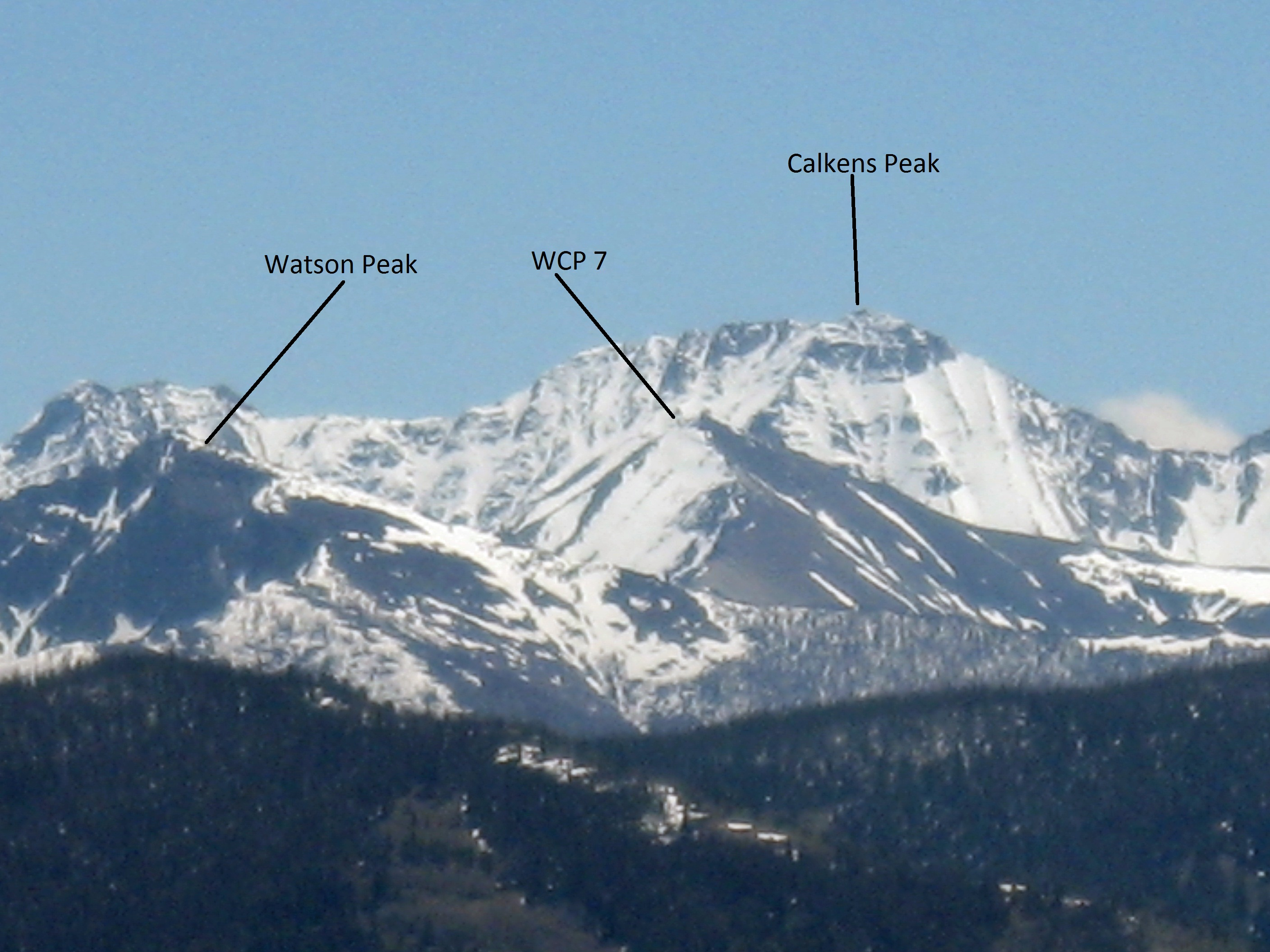
- Watson Peak at left

Highest point
- Elevation: 10,453 ft (3,186 m)
- Prominence: 773 ft (236 m)
- Parent peak: White Cloud Peak 5
- Coordinates: 44°07′51″N 114°41′08″W

Geography
- Location within Idaho
- Location: Custer County, Idaho, U.S.
- Parent range: White Cloud Mountains
- Topo map: USGS Robinson Bar

Climbing
- Easiest route: Scrambling, class 3

Watson Peak at 10,453 feet (3,186 m) above sea level is a peak in the White Cloud Mountains of Idaho. The peak is located in Sawtooth National Recreation Area in Custer County 1.41 mi (2.27 km) south-southwest White Cloud Peak 5, its line parent. Bear Lake is in the basin northwest of the peak.
