= D. O. Lee Peak =

Mountain in the state of Idaho

Lee Peak
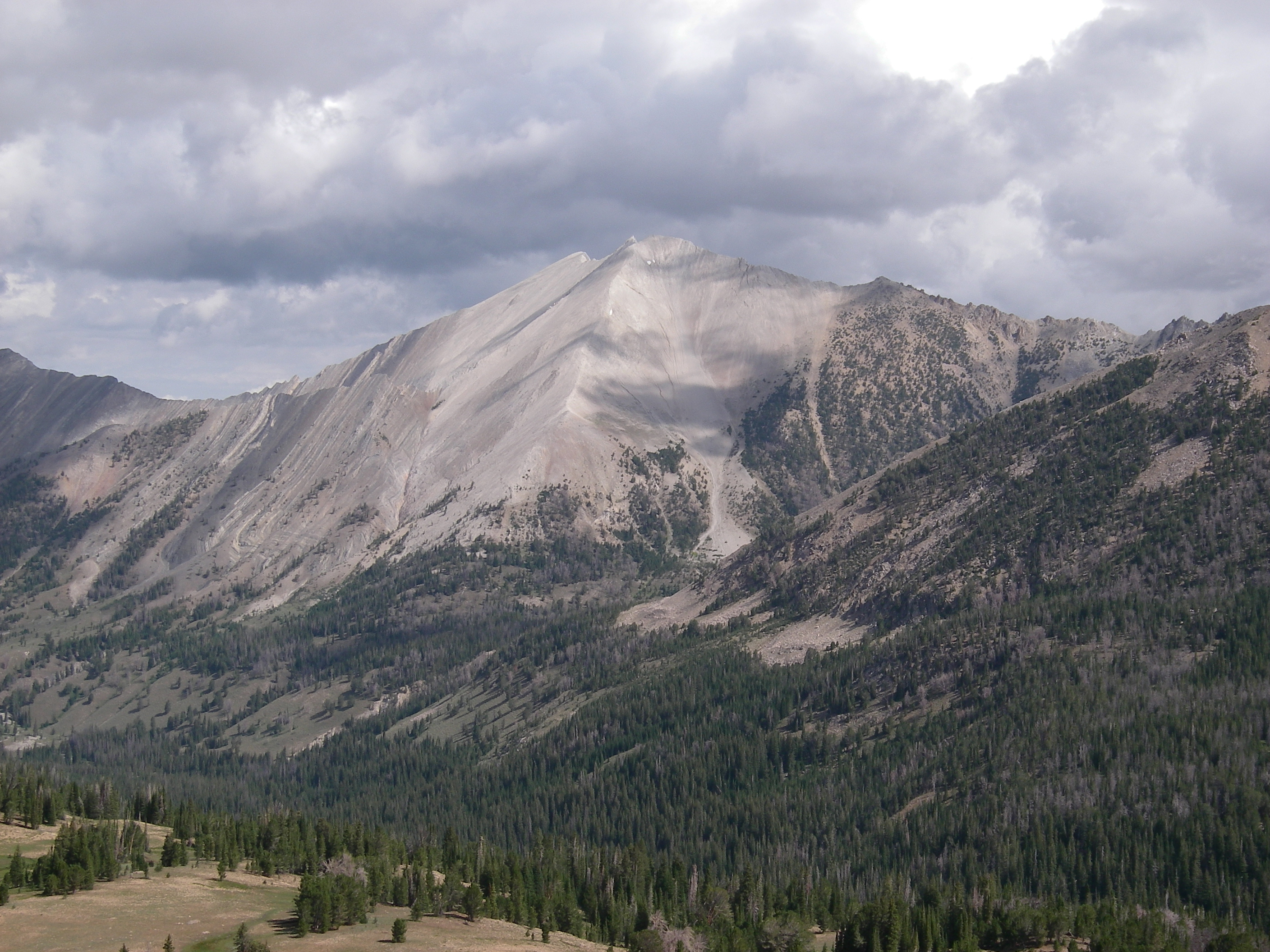

Highest point
- Elevation: 11,332 ft (3,454 m)
- Prominence: 542 ft (165 m)
- Parent peak: Calkins Peak
- Coordinates: 44°06′10″N 114°37′43″W

Geography
- Location within Idaho
- Location: Custer County, Idaho, U.S.
- Parent range: White Cloud Mountains
- Topo map: USGS Washington Peak

Climbing
- Easiest route: Scrambling, class 3

D. O. Lee Peak, also known as Lee Peak, at 11,347 feet (3,459 m) above sea level, is the third-highest peak in the White Cloud Mountains of the U.S. state of Idaho. It is one of the White Cloud Peaks and the 56th-highest peak in Idaho. It was named after Challis native David Oliver Lee (1934–1982), the first United States Forest Service ranger to be assigned to the Sawtooth Wilderness.

The peak is located 13 miles (21 km) southeast of Stanley in Sawtooth National Recreation Area of Custer County. It is situated 1.25 miles (2.01 km) south-southwest of Calkins Peak, its line parent, and rises to the west of Cirque, Sapphire, Cove, and the Born Lakes.

== See also ==
- Castle Peak (Idaho)
- Baker Lake
- Blackmon Peak
- Born Lakes
- Chamberlain Basin
