= Chamberlain Basin =

Drainage basin in Idaho, United States

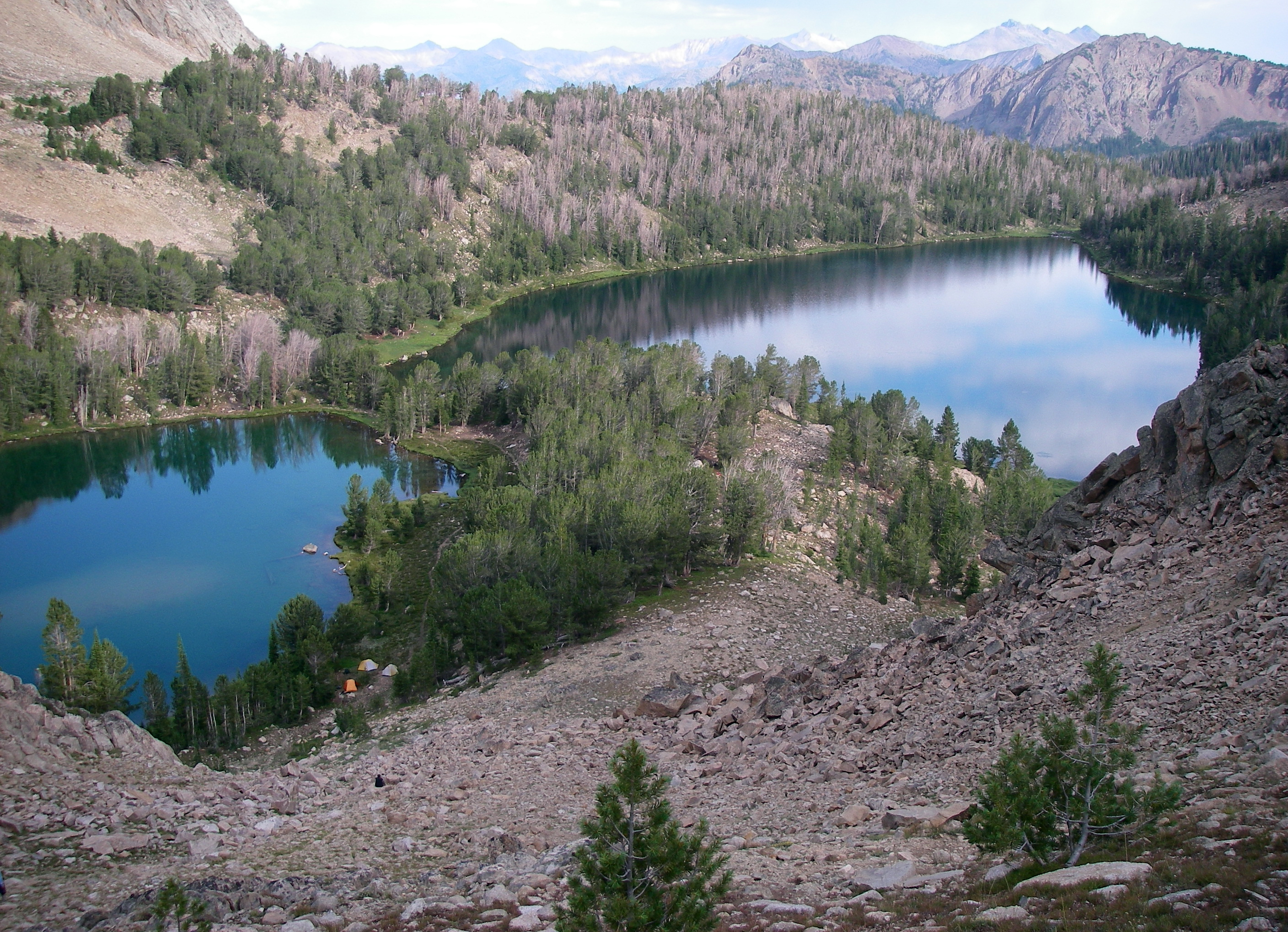
- Chamberlain Basin lakes number 8 and 9

- Location within Idaho
- Location: Custer County, Idaho
- Coordinates: 44.0285222°N 114.6003429°W
- Type: Glacial
- Primary outflows: Chamberlain Creek to Germania Creek
- Basin countries: United States
- Max. length: 4.8 mi (7.7 km)
- Surface elevation: 9,396 ft (2,864 m)

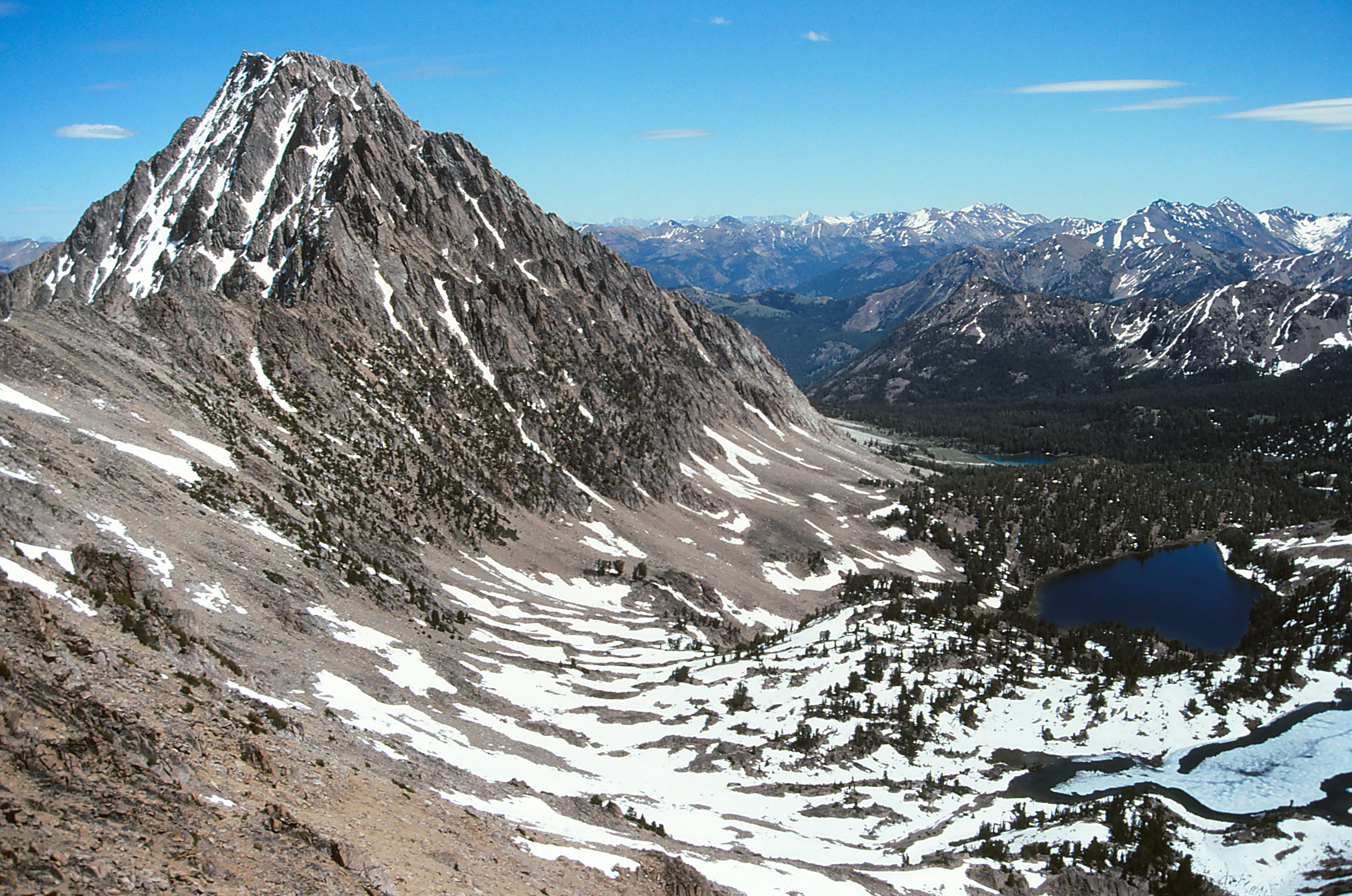
Chamberlain Basin below Castle Peak.

Chamberlain Basin is a drainage basin that contains a chain of ten alpine and glacial Paternoster lakes in Custer County, Idaho, United States, located in the White Cloud Mountains in the Sawtooth National Recreation Area. The lakes are on the upper portion of Chamberlain Creek in the Germania Creek watershed, a tributary of the East Fork Salmon River. Castle Peak, the highest summit in the White Cloud Mountains, rises to the east and north of Chamberlain Basin. Sawtooth National Forest trail 047 crosses the basin, although most people begin their trips at the Fourth of July Creek trailhead. Individual lakes do not have official names and are listed from lowest to highest elevation.

Chamberlain Lakes
Lake	Elevation	Max. length	Max. width	Location
Chamberlain Lake 1	2,804 m (9,199 ft)	109 m (358 ft)	88 m (289 ft)	44.024244°N 114.588538°W
Chamberlain Lake 2	2,808 m (9,213 ft)	407 m (1,335 ft)	175 m (574 ft)	44.026686°N 114.592728°W
Chamberlain Lake 3	2,826 m (9,272 ft)	90 m (300 ft)	54 m (177 ft)	44.024487°N 114.597014°W
Chamberlain Lake 4	2,827 m (9,275 ft)	95 m (312 ft)	55 m (180 ft)	44.023507°N 114.598931°W
Chamberlain Lake 5	2,827 m (9,275 ft)	183 m (600 ft)	117 m (384 ft)	44.020811°N 114.595077°W
Chamberlain Lake 6	2,862 m (9,390 ft)	69 m (226 ft)	54 m (177 ft)	44.028749°N 114.599065°W
Chamberlain Lake 7	2,890 m (9,480 ft)	38 m (125 ft)	32 m (105 ft)	44.030225°N 114.603694°W
Chamberlain Lake 8	2,893 m (9,491 ft)	461 m (1,512 ft)	248 m (814 ft)	44.033944°N 114.603881°W
Chamberlain Lake 9	2,899 m (9,511 ft)	182 m (597 ft)	116 m (381 ft)	44.036604°N 114.605169°W
Chamberlain Lake 10	3,007 m (9,865 ft)	372 m (1,220 ft)	113 m (371 ft)	44.038140°N 114.610143°W

== See also ==
- List of lakes of the White Cloud Mountains
- Sawtooth National Forest
- Sawtooth National Recreation Area
- White Cloud Mountains
