= Castle Peak (Idaho) =

Mountain in Idaho, United States

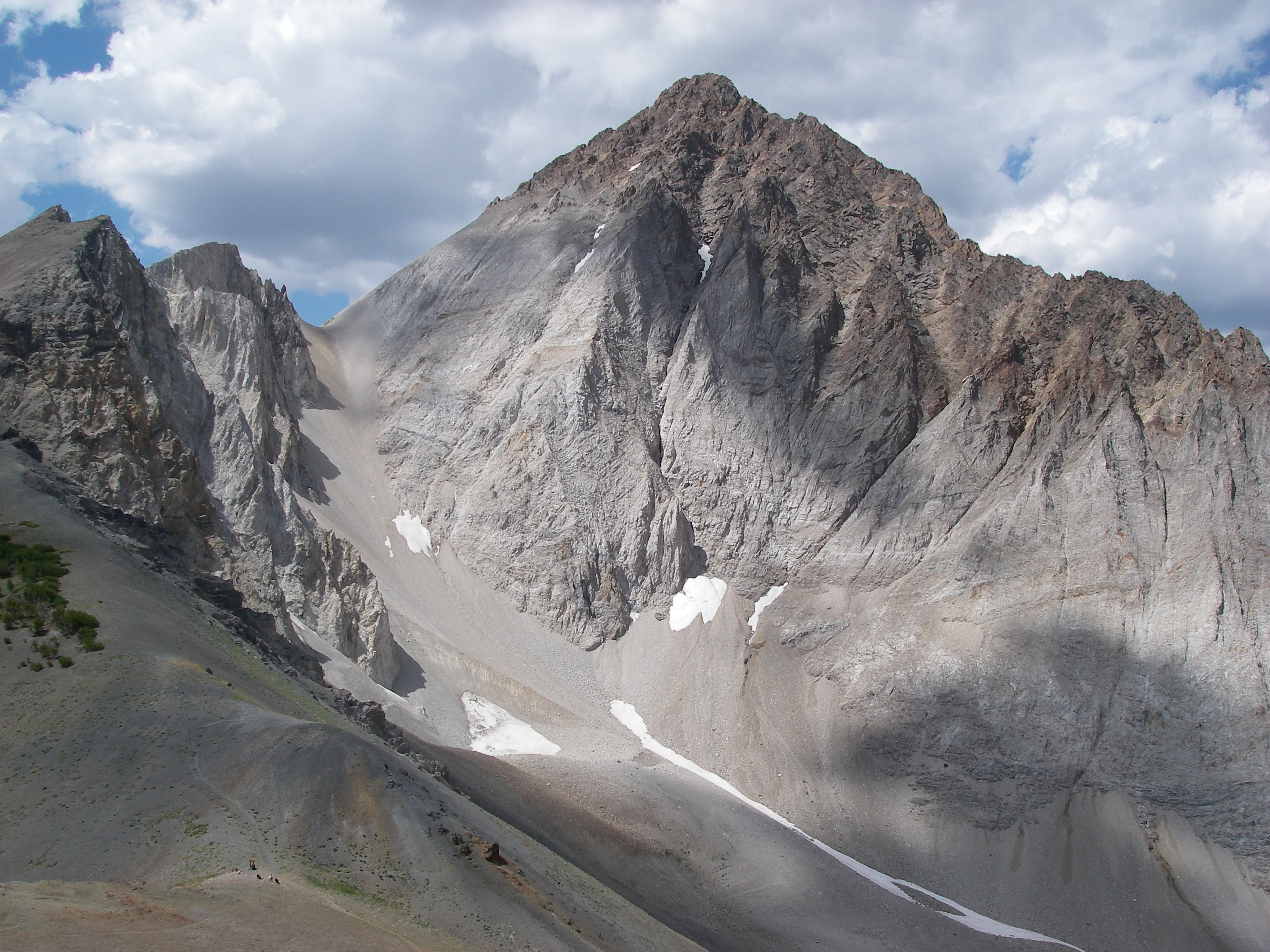
- Castle Peak in White Clouds, in 2014

Highest point
- Elevation: 11,815 ft (3,601 m)
- Prominence: 4,015 ft (1,224 m)
- Coordinates: 44°02′22″N 114°35′07″W

Geography
- Location within Idaho
- Location: Custer County, Idaho, U.S.
- Parent range: White Cloud Mountains
- Topo map: USGS Boulder Chain Lakes

Climbing
- Easiest route: Scramble, class 3

Castle Peak (11,815 feet; 3,601 m) is a mountain in the western United States, the highest peak in the White Cloud Mountains of central Idaho and the Idaho Batholith. Located in Custer County, it is the 6th highest peak in the state, and the ninth most prominent.

Castle Peak is within the Cecil D. Andrus–White Clouds Wilderness, which is part of Sawtooth National Recreation Area in Custer County. The towns of Stanley and Challis are both about 21 miles (34 km) away, and Ketchum-Sun Valley area is about 27 miles (43 km) from the peak.

Castle Peak is managed by the U.S. Forest Service and the area surrounding the peak can be easily accessed. Camping is permitted anywhere in Sawtooth National Forest and the lakes surrounding Castle Peak provide excellent places to stay. The peak rises to the northeast of Chamberlain Basin and south of Castle Lake and Merriam Peak. There are trails from parking area to the vicinity of Castle Peak, although no trails go up the peak itself. The easiest route up Castle Peak is a class 3 scramble from the Chamberlain Basin.

A proposed open-pit molybdenum mine at the base of Castle Peak became a leading issue in the 1970 gubernatorial race, and advanced the formation of the Sawtooth NRA in 1972. In a rematch of the 1966 election, Cecil Andrus defeated incumbent Don Samuelson to become the state's first Democratic governor in nearly a quarter-century, and Republicans did not regain the governorship until January 1995.

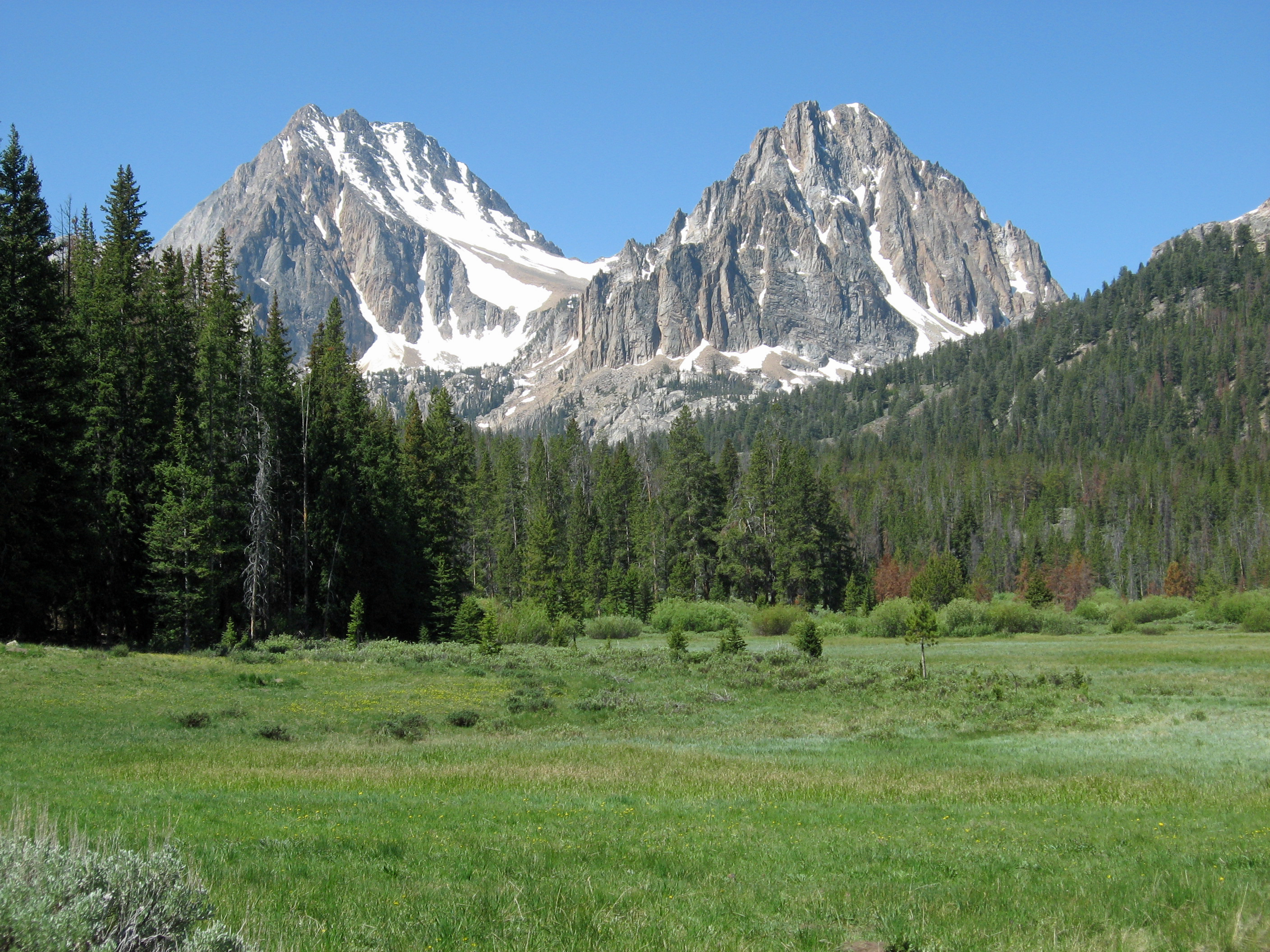
Castle Peak (left) and Merriam Peak (right)

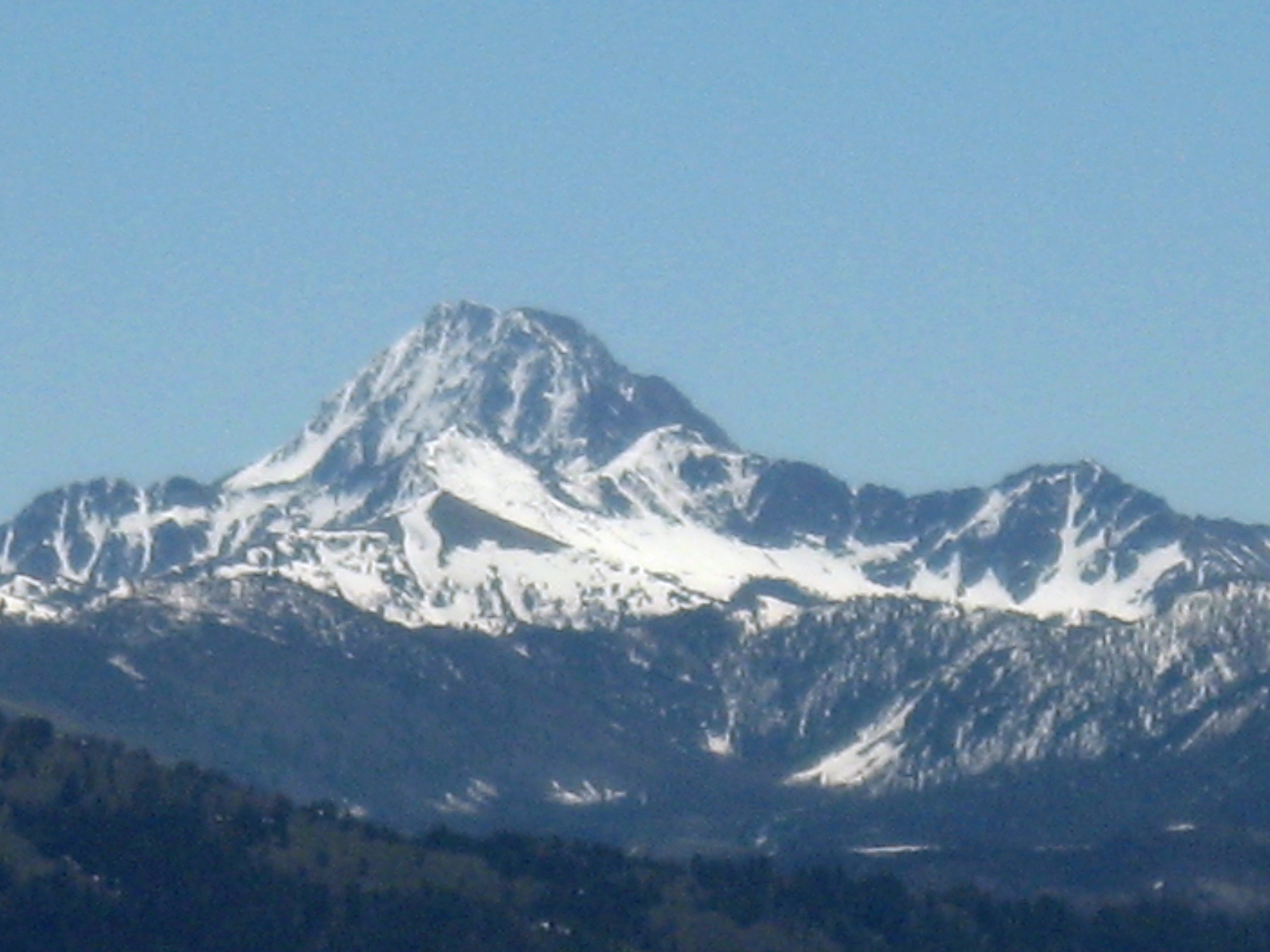
Castle Peak from Sawtooth Mountains

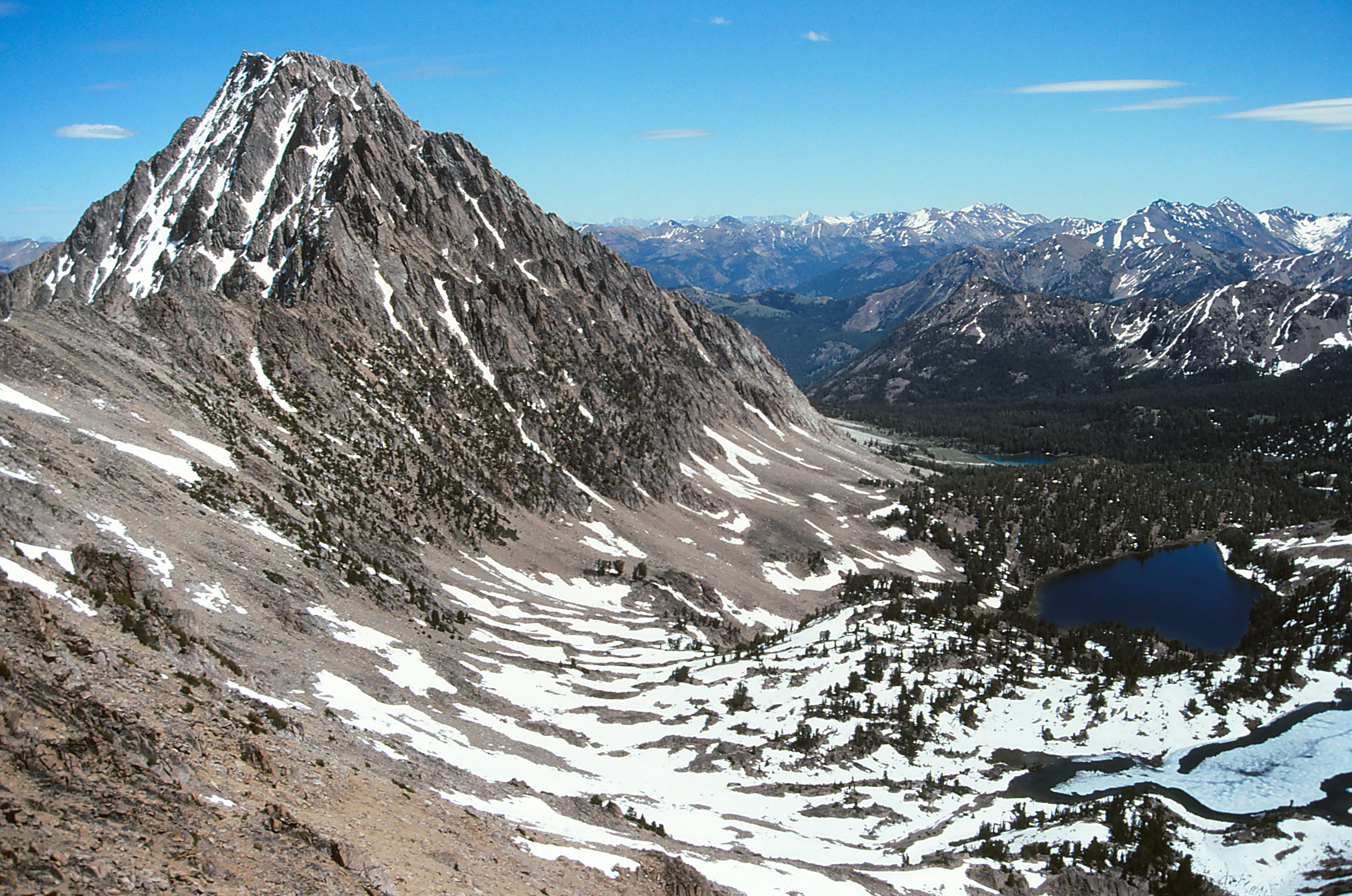
Castle Peak

== See also ==
- List of mountain ranges in Idaho
- Idaho Batholith
- D. O. Lee Peak
- Born Lakes
- Chamberlain Basin
