= Horton Peak =

Mountain in the state of Idaho

- Location within Idaho

Highest point
- Elevation: 9,896 ft (3,016 m)
- Prominence: 276 ft (84 m)
- Coordinates: 43°57′57″N 114°44′54″W

Geography
- Location: Custer County, Idaho, U.S.
- Parent range: White Cloud Mountains
- Topo map: USGS Horton Peak

Climbing
- Easiest route: Hiking, class 1

Horton Peak at 9,896 feet (3,016 m) above sea level is a peak in the White Cloud Mountains of Idaho. The peak is located in Sawtooth National Recreation Area in Custer County. Horton Peak rises above the southeastern end of the Sawtooth Valley west of the Sawtooth Range and Idaho State Highway 75. A trail goes to the summit from the end of forest road 459 in the Sawtooth Valley.

Horton Peak was named after forest ranger William H. Horton (1867–1935), who is memorialized at the Pole Creek Ranger Station, located about two miles southeast of Horton Peak. A U.S. Forest Service fire lookout on the summit was constructed in 1938 by the Civilian Conservation Corps, was used until the 1970s, and still stands on the summit.
