= Swimm Lake =

Alpine lake in the state of Idaho

- Location within Idaho Location within the United States
- Location: Custer County, Idaho
- Coordinates: 44°08′56″N 114°40′04″W
- Type: Glacial
- Primary outflows: Swimm Creek to Warm Springs Creek to Salmon River
- Basin countries: United States
- Max. length: 460 m (1,510 ft)
- Max. width: 240 m (790 ft)
- Surface elevation: 2,702 m (8,865 ft)

Swimm Lake is an alpine lake in Custer County, Idaho, United States, located in the White Cloud Mountains in the Sawtooth National Recreation Area. There are no trails that go to the lake.

Swimm Lake is northeast of Watson Peak and Bear Lake, although Bear Lake is in a separate sub-basin.

== See also ==
- List of lakes of the White Cloud Mountains
- Sawtooth National Recreation Area
- White Cloud Mountains
