= Washington Peak (Idaho) =

Mountain in Idaho, USA

- Location within Idaho

Highest point
- Elevation: 10,519 ft (3,206 m)
- Prominence: 859 ft (262 m)
- Parent peak: Fourth of July Peak
- Coordinates: 44°00′31″N 114°40′21″W

Geography
- Location: Custer County, Idaho, U.S.
- Parent range: White Cloud Mountains
- Topo map: USGS Washington Peak

Climbing
- Easiest route: Simple scrambling, class 2

Washington Peak at 10,519 feet (3,206 m) above sea level is a peak in the White Cloud Mountains of Idaho. The peak is located in Sawtooth National Recreation Area in Custer County 2.37 mi (3.81 km) from Fourth of July Peak, its line parent. It is the 264th highest peak in Idaho.
