= White Cloud Mountains =

Mountain in Idaho, United States

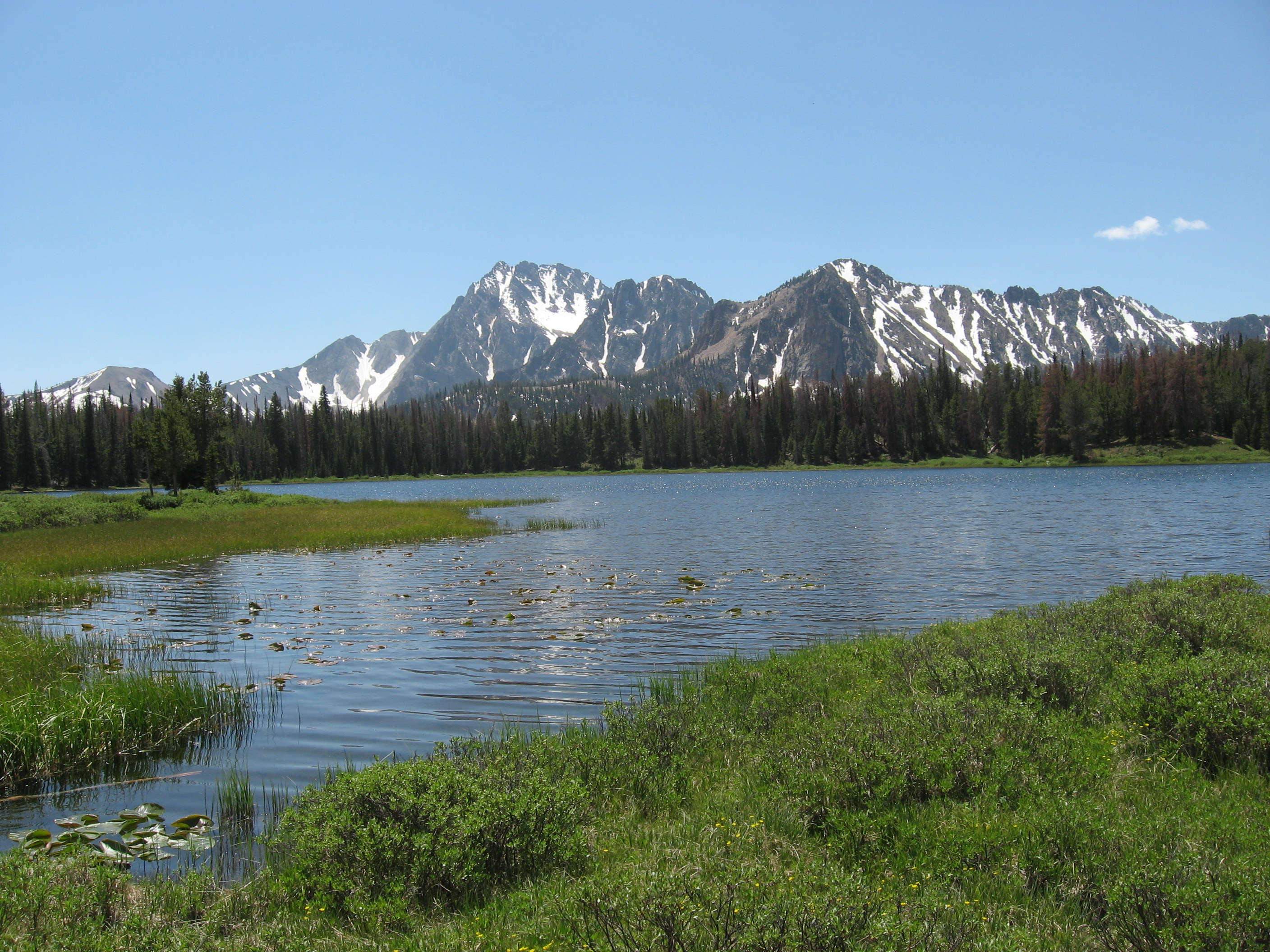
- White Cloud Mountains

Highest point
- Peak: Castle Peak
- Elevation: 11,815 ft (3,601 m)
- Coordinates: 44°02′22″N 114°35′07″W

Dimensions
- Length: 25 mi (40 km) N/S
- Width: 32 mi (51 km) E/W
- Area: 461 mi^{2} (1,190 km^{2})

Geography
- Location within Idaho
- Country: United States
- State: Idaho
- Parent range: Rocky Mountains
- Borders on: Sawtooth Mountains and Boulder Mountains

The White Cloud Mountains are part of the Rocky Mountains of the western United States, located in central Idaho, southeast of Stanley in Custer County. The range is located within the Sawtooth National Recreation Area (SNRA) and partially within the Cecil D. Andrus–White Clouds Wilderness.

The White Cloud Mountains are located on National Forest land, with numerous trails in the area. Camping is permitted anywhere on the national forest land and there are no fees to access the area. Primary access to the area is via State Highway 75, the Salmon River Scenic Byway, which accompanies the main Salmon River as it descends along the range's western and northern perimeter.

The highest peak in the White Cloud Mountains, and the SNRA, is Castle Peak at 11,815 ft (3,601 m). The Sawtooth Mountains are about twenty miles (32 km) west of the White Clouds, on the west side of the river and highway, and the Boulder Mountains are directly south of the White Clouds.

== Peaks ==
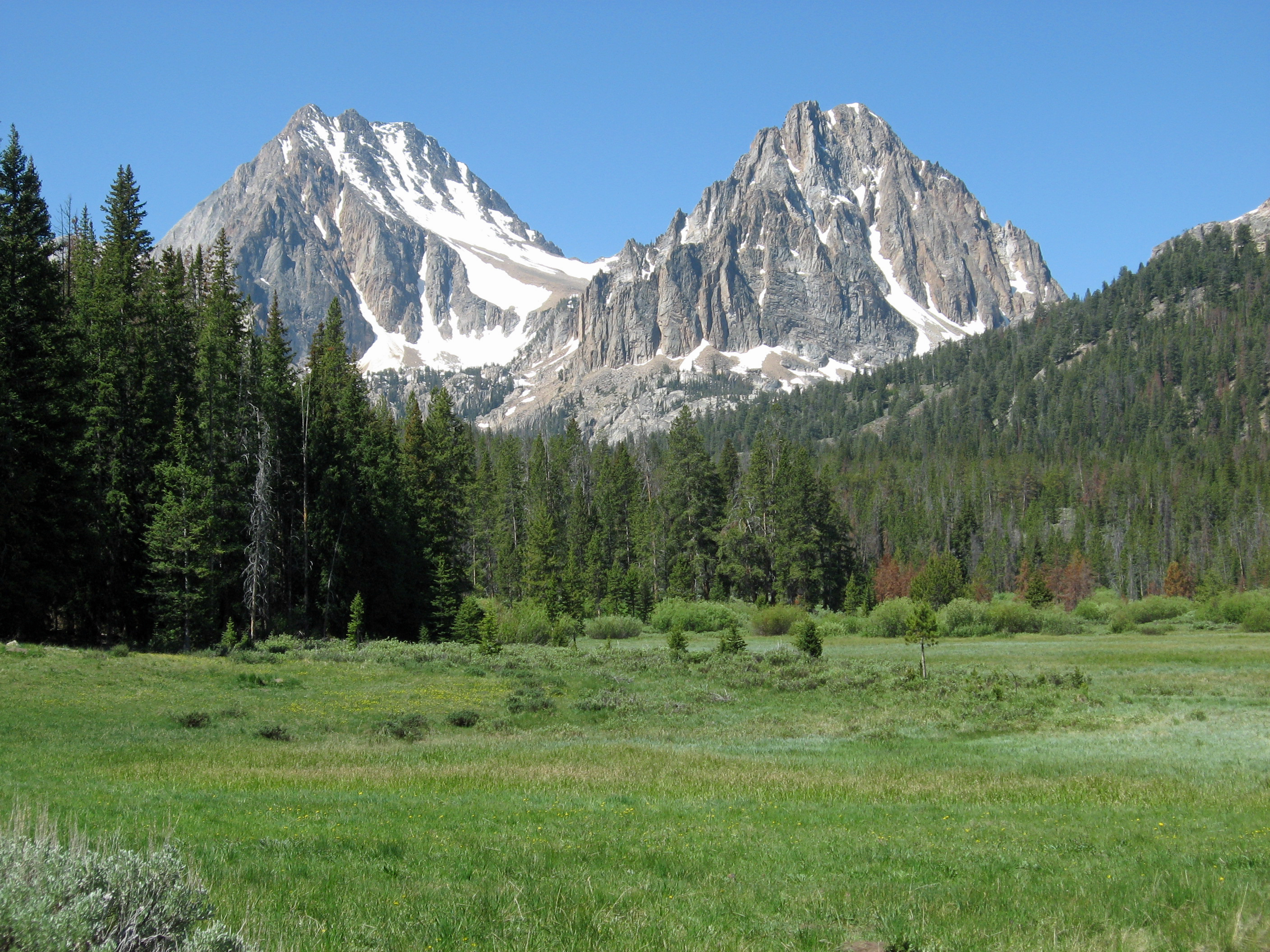
Castle and Merriam Peaks

Peaks of the White Cloud Mountains
Mountain Peak	Elevation	Prominence	Isolation	Location	Easiest Route
Castle Peak	11,814 ft 3601 m	4,016 ft 1224 m	27.3 mi 43.9 km	44.039558°N 114.585266°W	Class 3
Calkins Peak	11,486 ft 3501 m	1,247 ft 380 m	5.8 mi 9.33 km	44.119646°N 114.620093°W	Class 3
D. O. Lee Peak	11,342 ft 3457 m	541 ft 165 m	1.25 mi 2.01 km	44.102674°N 114.628671°W	Class 3
Lonesome Lake Peak	11,302 ft 3445 m	801 ft 244 m	1.11 mi 1.78 km	44.075396°N 114.612077°W	Class 2
Peak 11,272	11,280 ft 3438 m	673 ft 205 m	1.24 mi 2 km	44.09126°N 114.609296°W	Class 3
White Cloud Peak 9	11,263 ft 3433 m	463 ft 141 m	0.61 mi 0.98 km	44.111383°N 114.626608°W	Class 2
Chinese Wall	11,237 ft 3425 m	197 ft 60 m	0.53 mi 0.86 km	44.127324°N 114.618743°W	unknown
White Cloud Peak 10	11,102 ft 3384 m	341 ft 104 m	0.53 mi 0.85 km	44.117573°N 114.609906°W	Class 4
Merriam Peak	10,919 ft 3328 m	518 ft 158 m	0.57 mi 0.91 km	44.052126°N 114.580744°W	Class 3
Patterson Peak	10,873 ft 3314 m	252 ft 77 m	1.7 mi 2.74 km	44.04880°N 114.61780°W	Class 2
White Cloud Peak 7	10,778 ft 3285 m	677 ft 206 m	1.48 mi 2.38 km	44.12254°N 114.65374°W	Class 3
Fourth of July Peak	10,712 ft 3265 m	1,133 ft 345 m	2.54 mi 4.09 km	44.03010°N 114.63500°W	Class 2
White Cloud Peak 5	10,597 ft 3230 m	977 ft 298 m	0.91 mi 1.46 km	44.13550°N 114.65810°W	Class 4
White Cloud Peak 3	10,587 ft 3227 m	808 ft 246 m	1.44 mi 2.32 km	44.15620°N 114.65990°W	Class 3
White Cloud Peak 8	10,558 ft 3218 m	457 ft 139 m	0.94 mi 1.51 km	44.10503°N 114.64697°W	Class 3
Washington Peak	10,518 ft 3206 m	859 ft 262 m	2.37 mi 3.81 km	44.00850°N 114.67260°W	Class 2
Ebony Peak	10,512 ft 3204 m	334 ft 102 m	1.13 mi 1.82 km	44.01770°N 114.65320°W	Class 3
Watson Peak	10,449 ft 3185 m	353 ft 108 m	0.68 mi 1.09 km	44.130972°N 114.685666°W	Class 3
White Cloud Peak 4	10,449 ft 3185 m	810 ft 247 m	1.01 mi 1.63 km	44.13890°N 114.67790°W	Class 3
Croseus Peak	10,387 ft 3166 m	188 ft 57 m	0.47 mi 0.76 km	43.997965°N 114.651733°W	unknown
White Cloud Peak 1	10,354 ft 3156 m	453 ft 138 m	0.88 mi 1.42 km	44.16870°N 114.65777°W	Class 2
Blackmon Peak	10,308 ft 3142 m	400 ft 122 m	2.46 mi 3.96 km	44.05820°N 114.65140°W	Class 2
White Cloud Peak 2	10,272 ft 3131 m	491 ft 150 m	0.81 mi 1.3 km	44.15860°N 114.67550°W	Class 3
White Cloud Peak 6	10,256 ft 3126 m	316 ft 96 m	0.37 mi 0.6 km	44.13046°N 114.64765°W	Class 2
Peak 10,041	10,039 ft 3060 m	581 ft 177 m	0.73 mi 1.17 km	43.956400°N 114.707000°W	Class 2
Lookout Mountain	9,954 ft 3034 m	1,854 ft 565 m	8.3 mi 13.36 km	44.192659°N 114.758948°W	Class 1
Peak 9,988	9,954 ft 3034 m	728 ft 222 m	1.46 mi 2.35 km	43.94510°N 114.66720°W	Class 2
Horton Peak	9,895 ft 3016 m	276 ft 84 m	0.83 mi 1.34 km	43.96580°N 114.74750°W	Class 1
Bible Back Mountain	9,885 ft 3013 m	428 ft 130 m	1.15 mi 1.85 km	43.997688°N 114.637843°W	unknown
Potaman Peak	9,367 ft 2,855 m	1,509 ft 460 m	7.7 mi 12.39 km	44.22015°N 114.396944°W	unknown

== Lakes ==
See List of lakes of the White Cloud Mountains

== Mine proposal ==
In 1970, it was proposed that the White Cloud Mountains be the site of an open-pit mine. The proposal became a major issue in Idaho's 1970 gubernatorial election. Incumbent Republican governor Don Samuelson favored the mine, as it would generate an estimated $4 million in revenue to the state. However, his Democratic opponent, Cecil Andrus, opposed the mine on conservation grounds. His stance was backed by many of the state's urban residents, who enjoyed vacationing at the mountains. Andrus won the election by more than four points, and it has been suggested that Andrus's stance on the mine was a contributing factor to his victory, and in particular to his victories in the normally Republican-leaning urban parts of the state.

== Photos ==
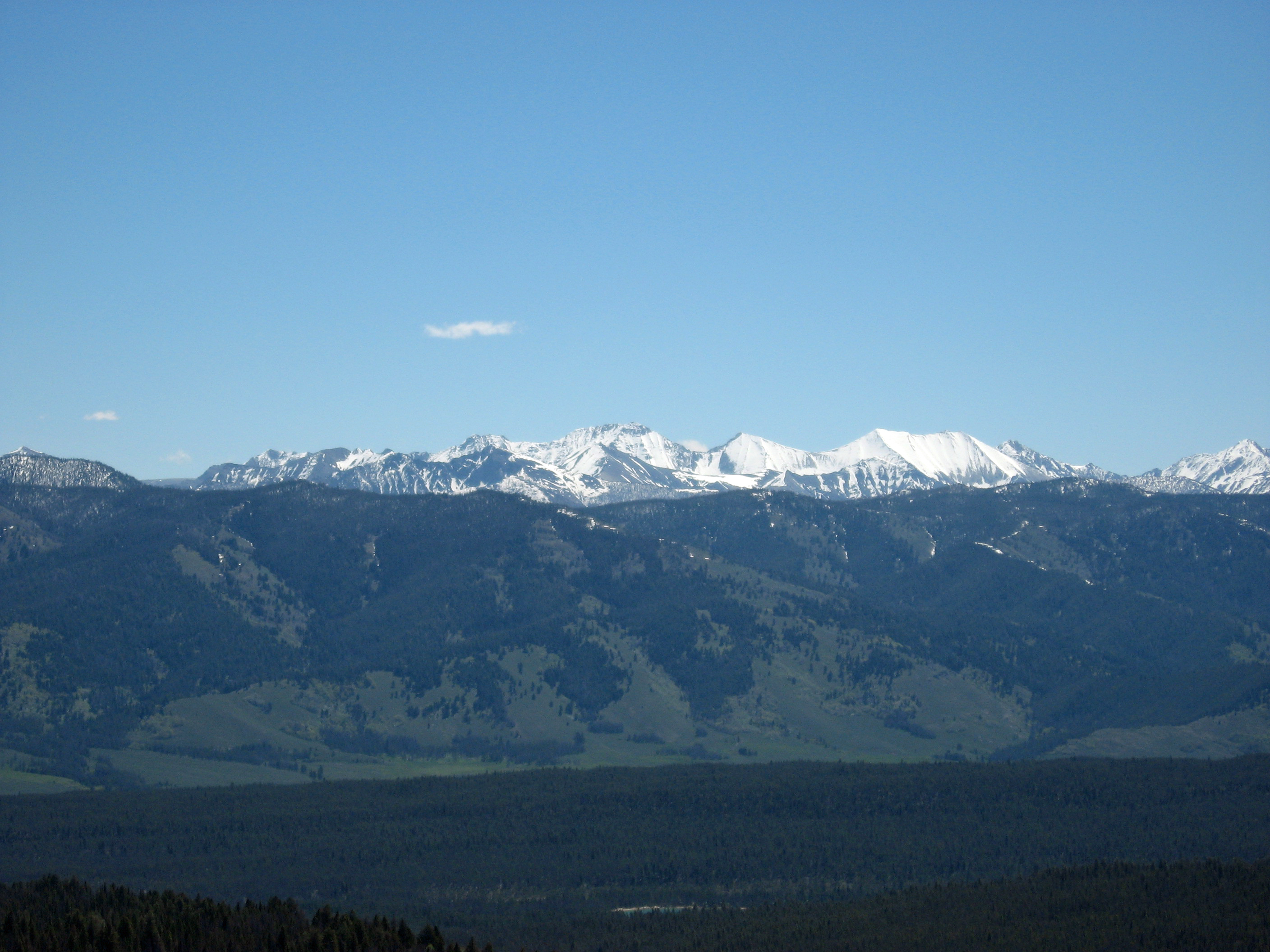
White Cloud Mountains viewed from Sawtooth Mountains

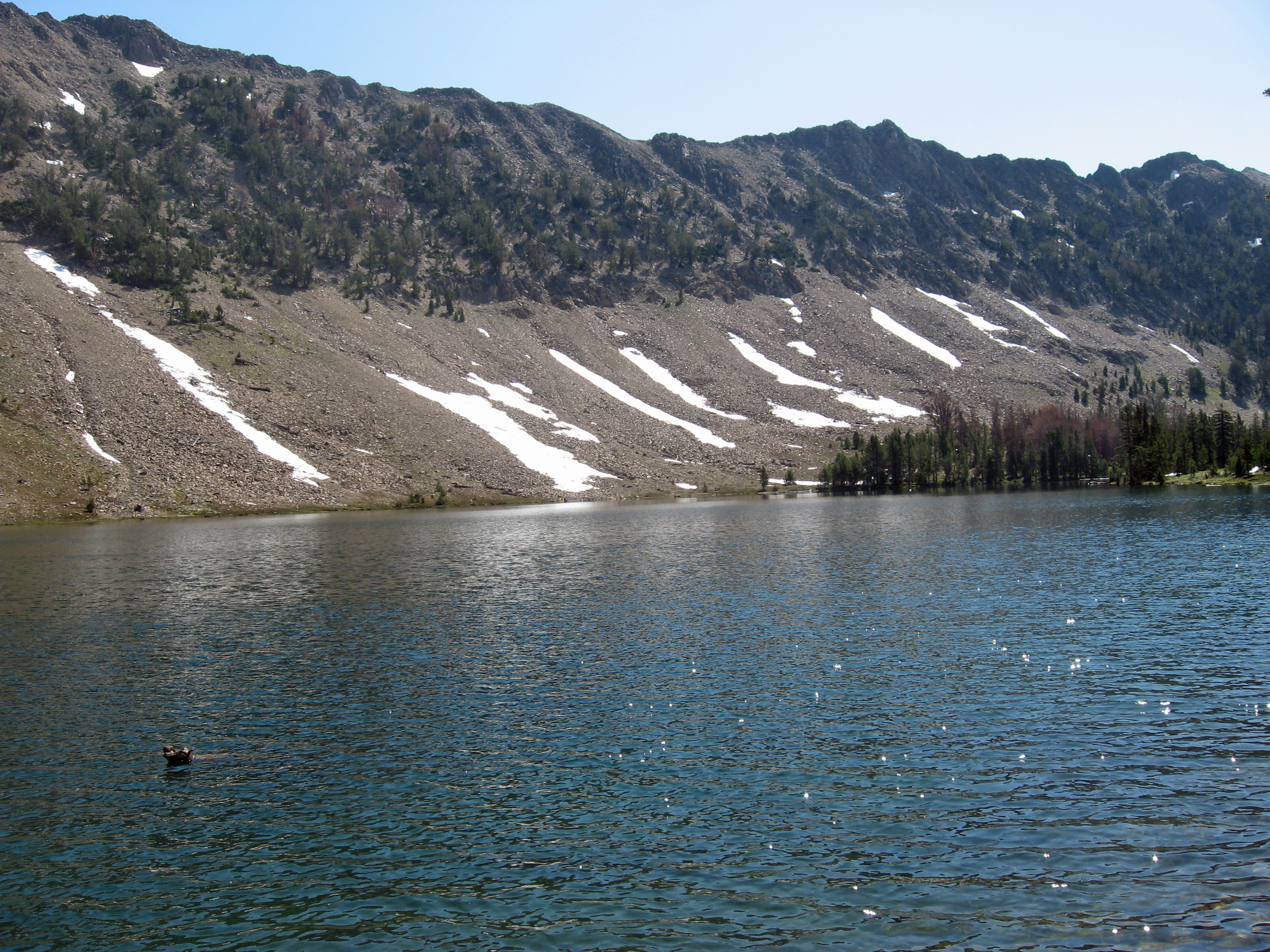
Washington Lake in the White Cloud Mountains

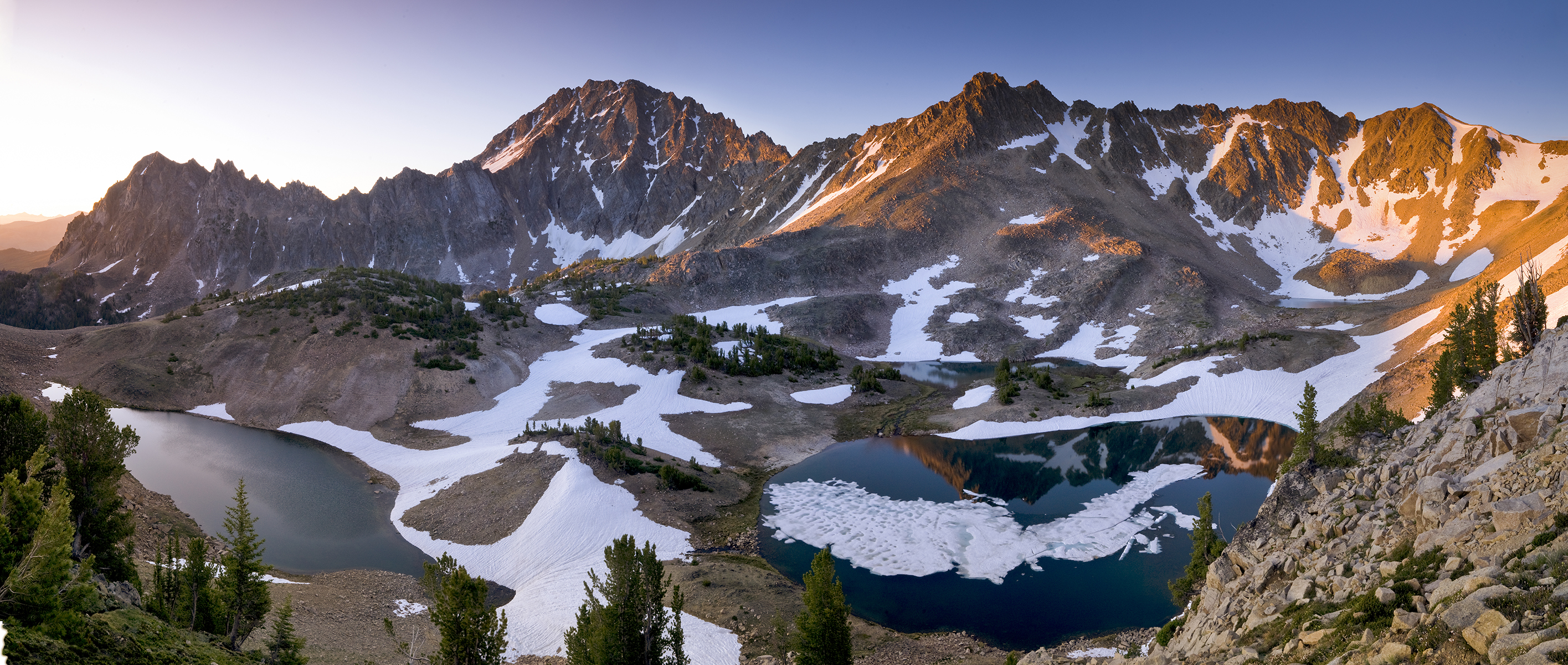
Castle Peak to left of center

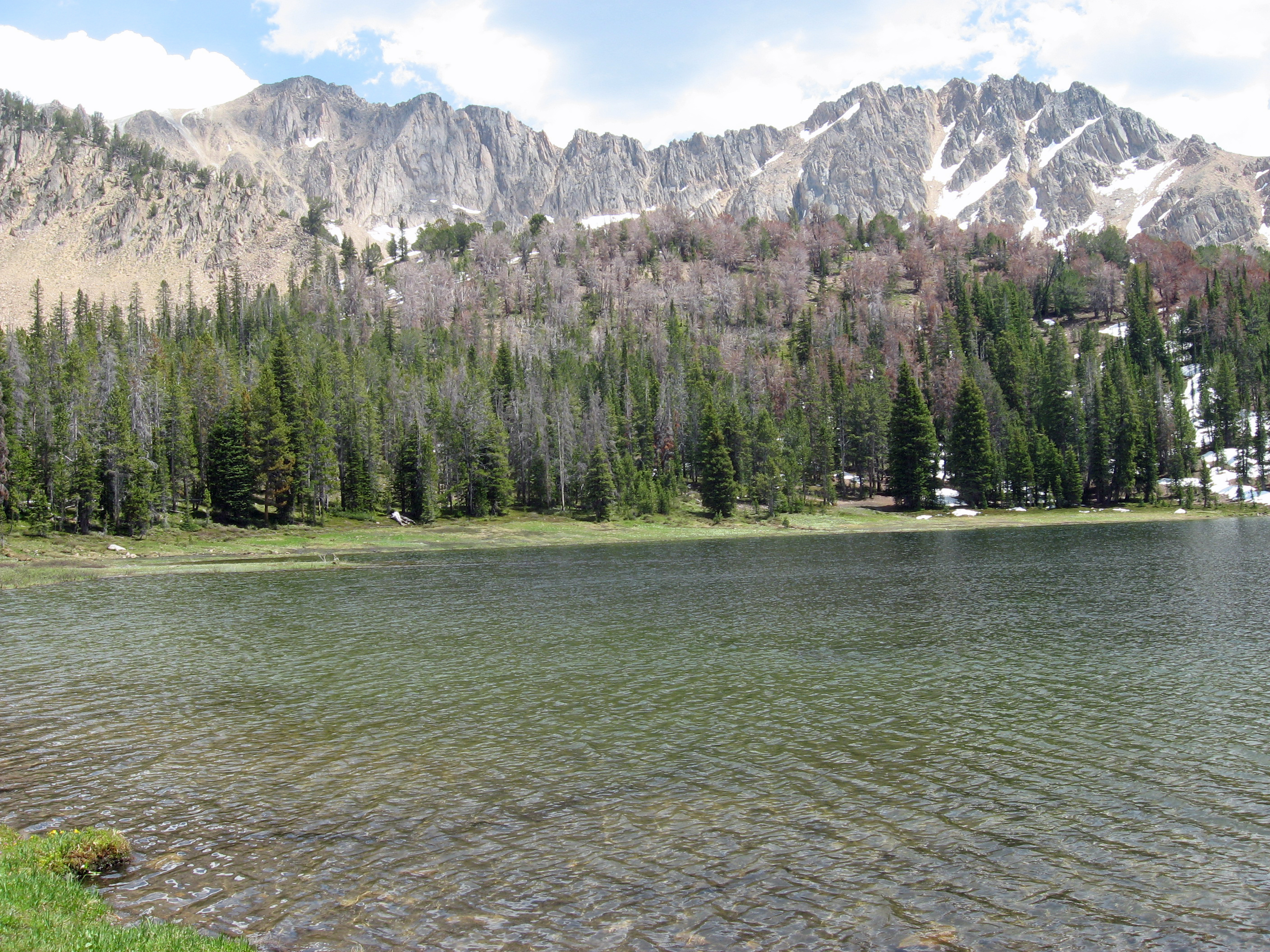
Fourth of July Lake in the White Cloud Mountains

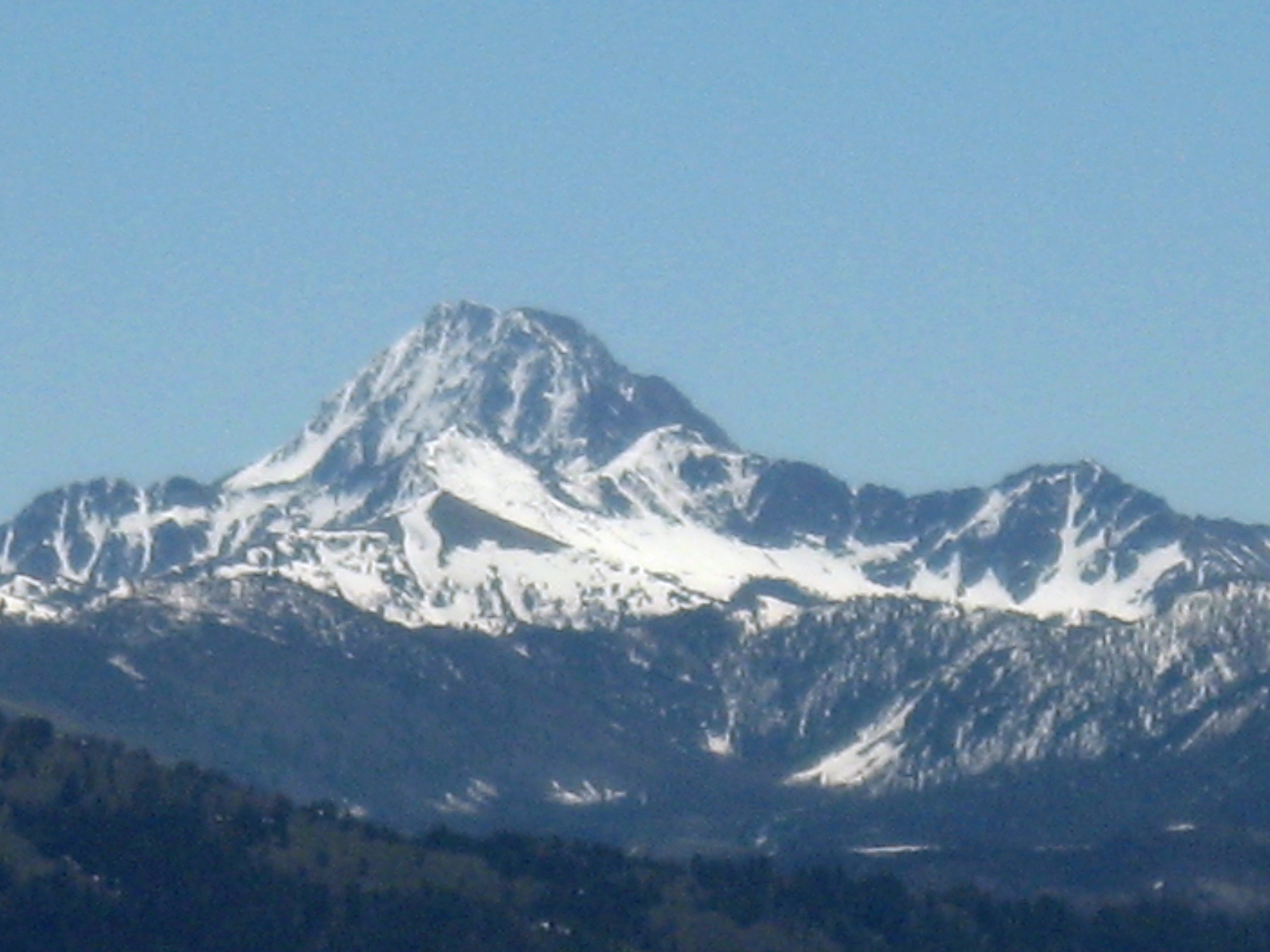
Castle Peak

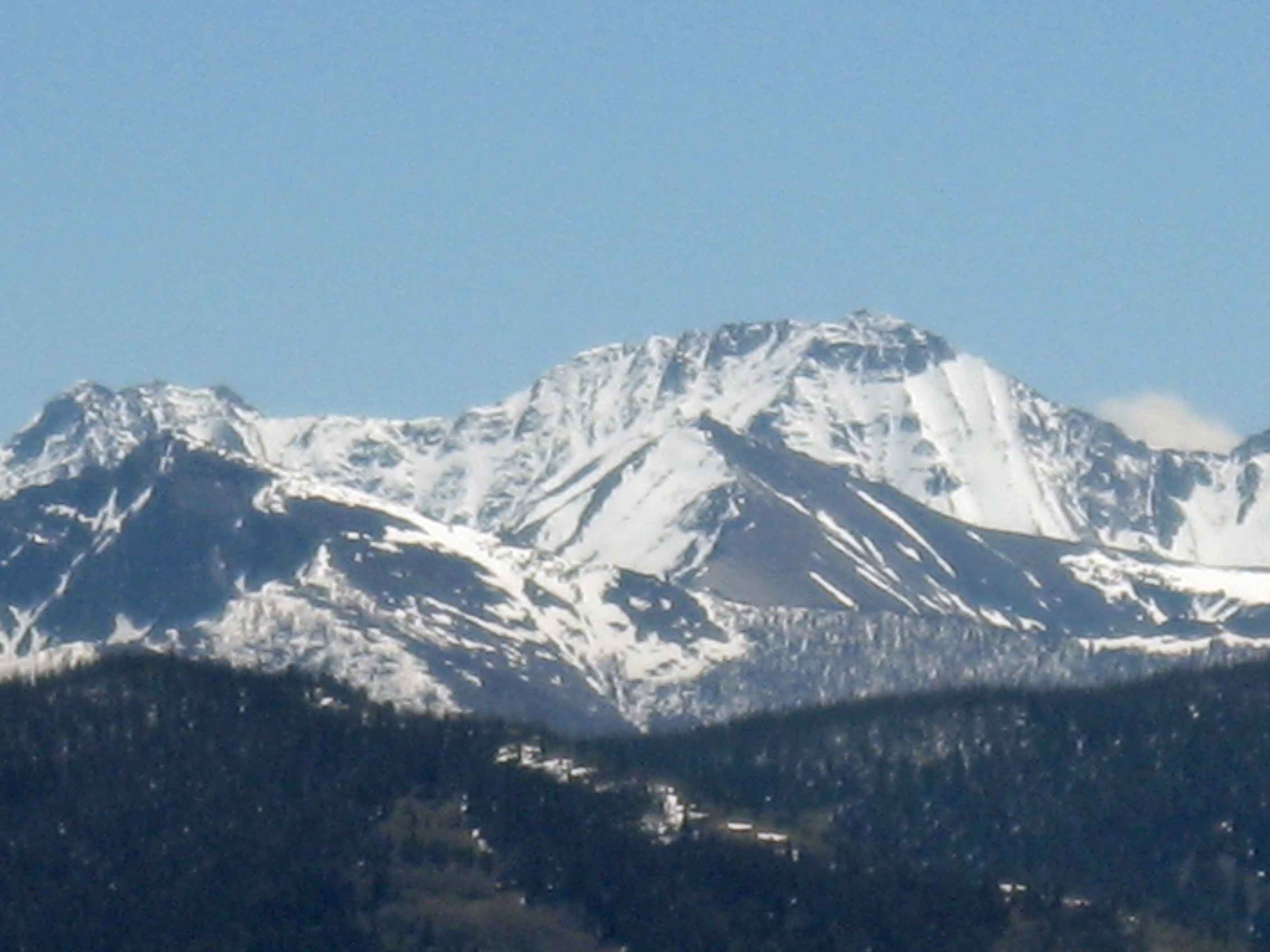
White Cloud Mountains

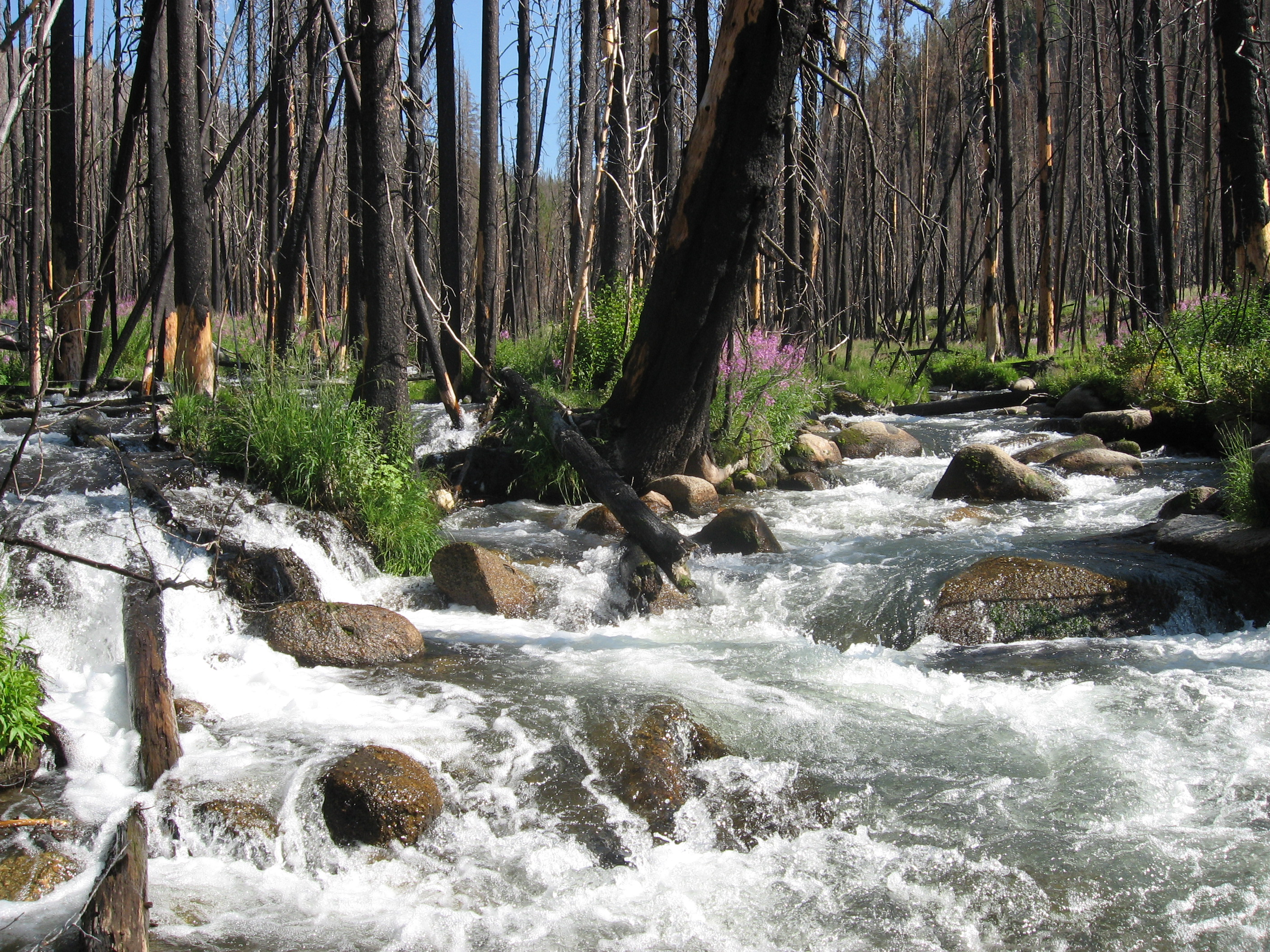
Warm Spring Creek in White Cloud Mountains

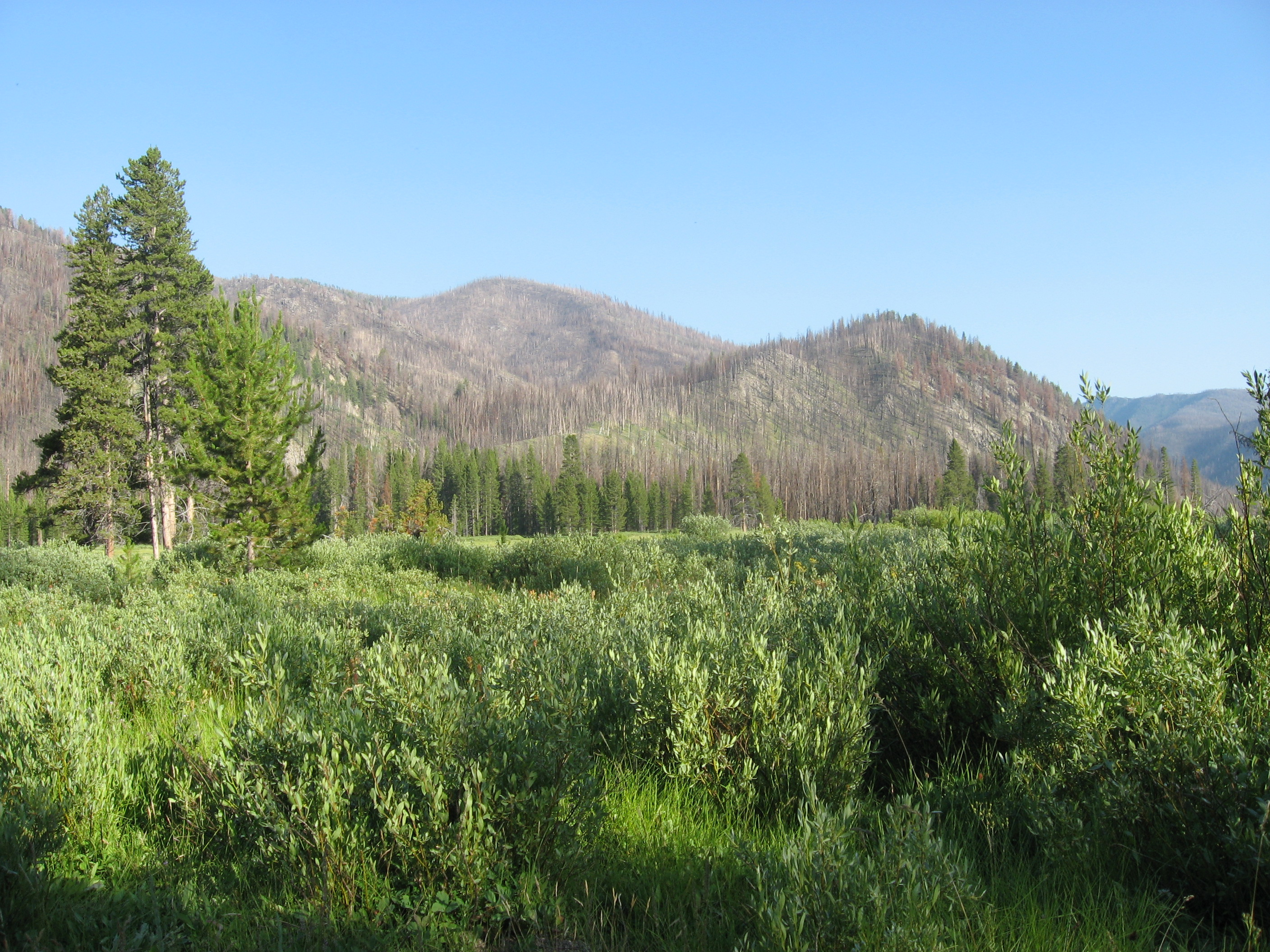
Warm Springs Meadow in White Cloud Mountains

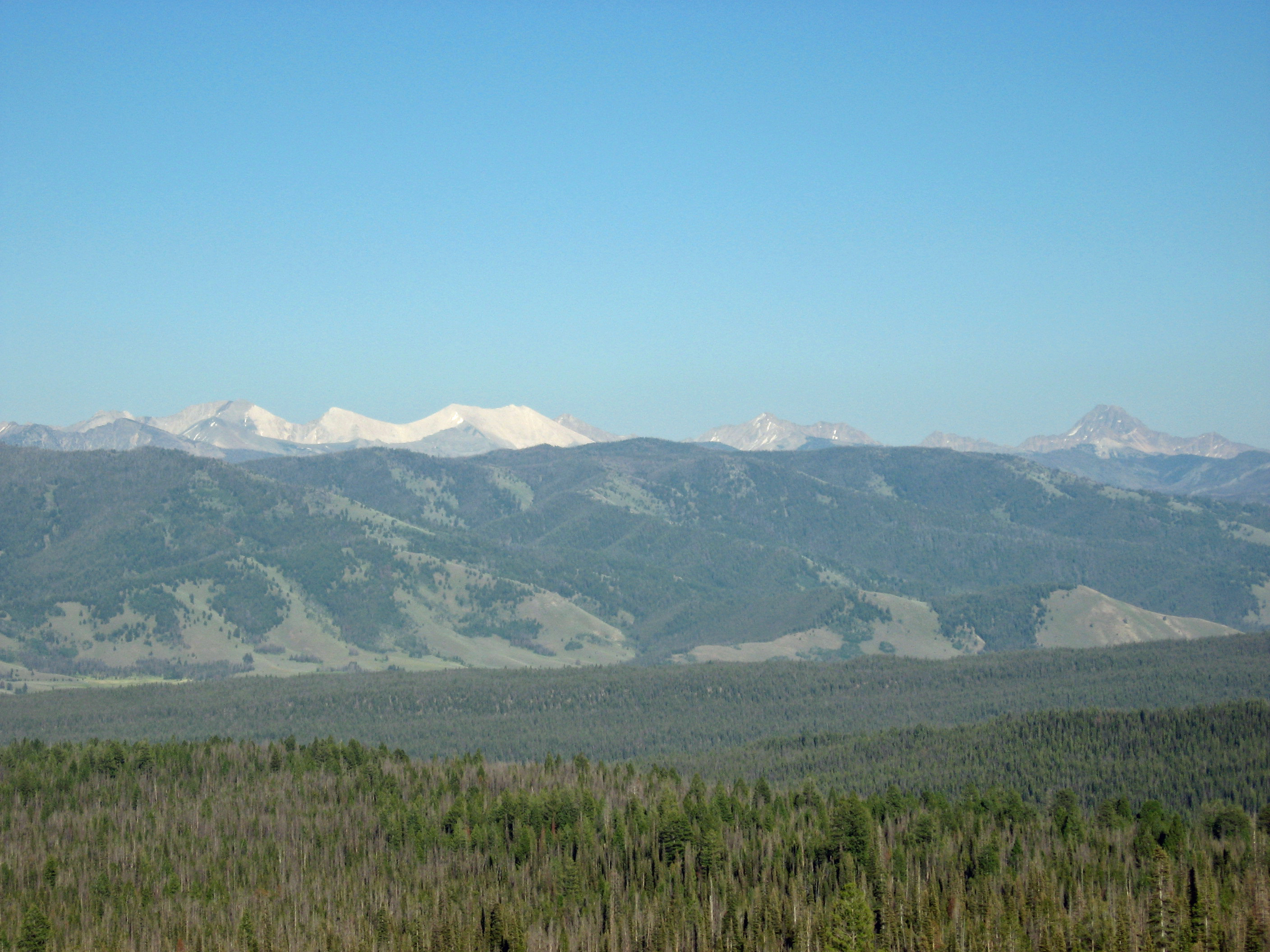
White Cloud Mountains

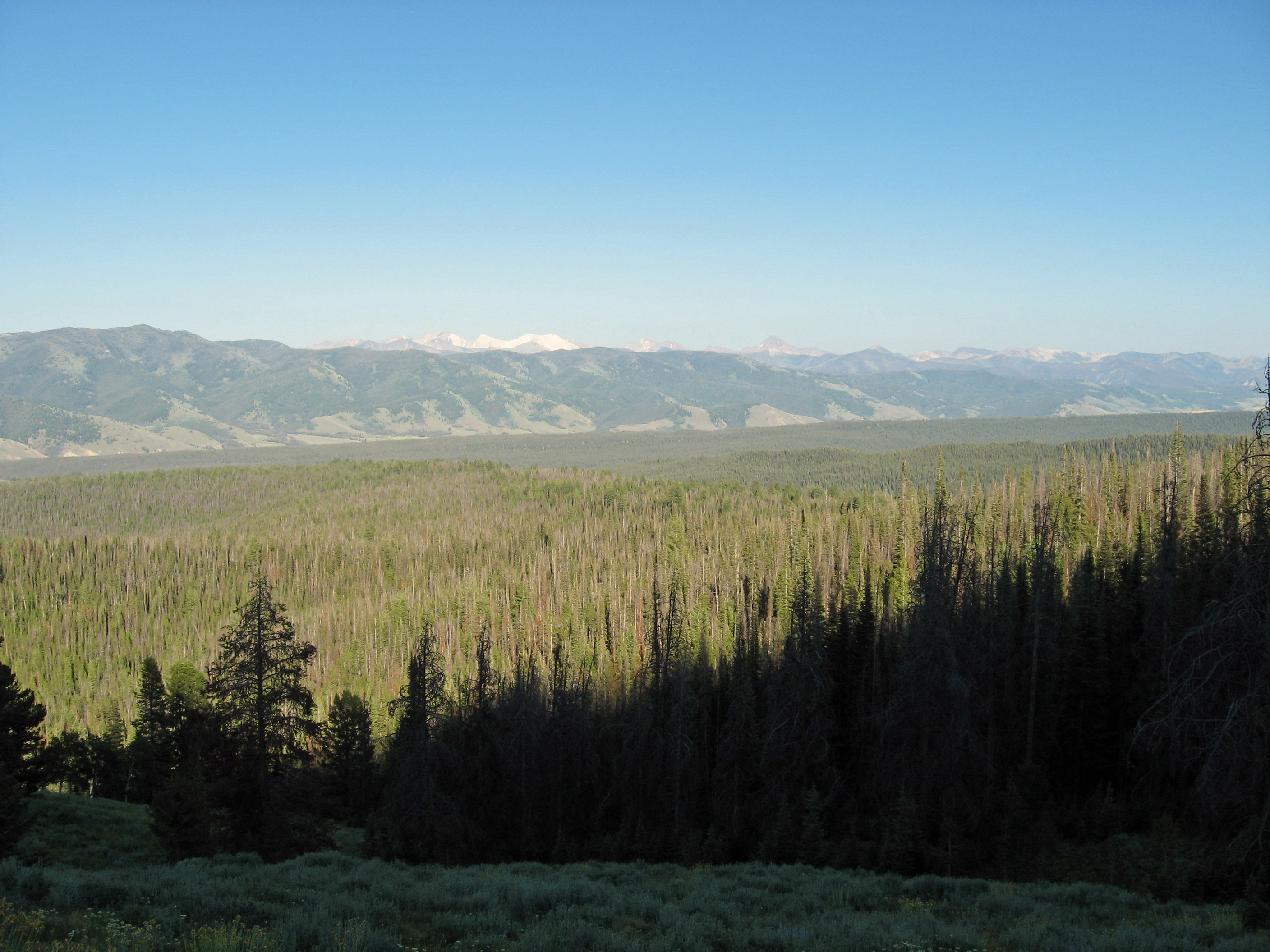
White Cloud Mountains across Sawtooth Valley

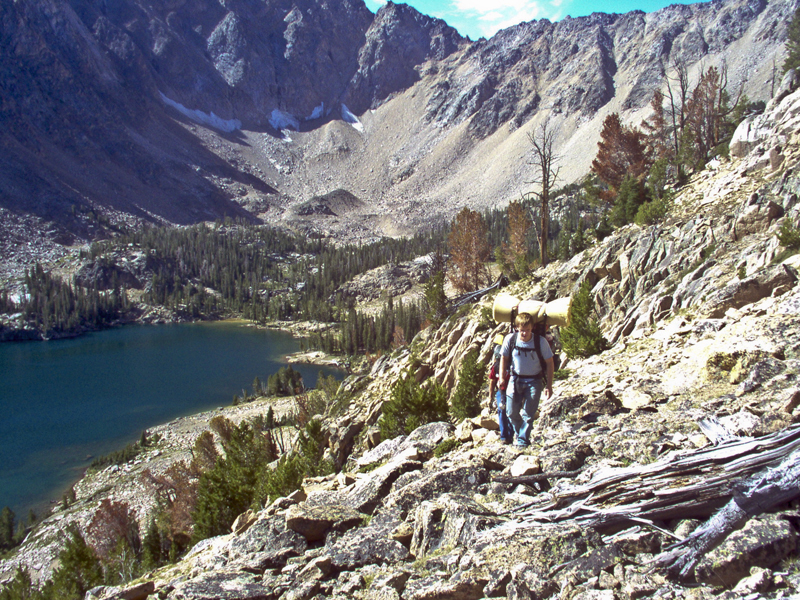
Hikers leaving Quiet Lake, which sits at the base of Castle Peak and Merriam Peak.

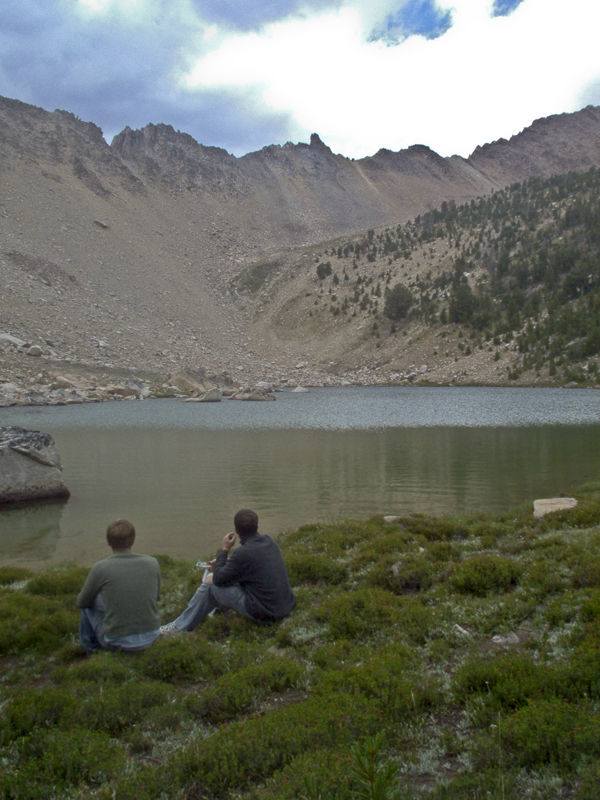
Hikers eating lunch at Shallow Lake with the Devil's Staircase on the horizon.
