= Line parent =

Term in topography

A peak's line parent is the closest higher peak on the highest ridge leading away from the peak's "key col". A col is the lowest point on the ridge between two summits and is roughly synonymous with the lowest point of a gap, saddle and notch. The highest col of a peak is its key col. If there is more than one ridge which can be followed to a higher peak then the line parent is the peak closest to the key col. Usually, a line parent must meet some prominence criteria, which might vary depending on the author and the location of the peak.

There are at least two other kinds of peak parentage: island parentage, which is also referred to as encirclement or topographic parentage, and source parentage.

== See also ==
- Topographic prominence
