= Walker Lake (Idaho) =

Alpine lake in the state of Idaho

- Location within Idaho Location within the United States
- Location: Custer County, Idaho
- Coordinates: 44.106920°N 114.597314°W
- Type: Glacial
- Primary outflows: Little Boulder Creek to East Fork Salmon River
- Basin countries: United States
- Max. length: 570 m (1,870 ft)
- Max. width: 225 m (738 ft)
- Surface elevation: 2,820 m (9,250 ft)

Walker Lake is an alpine lake in Custer County, Idaho, United States, located in the White Cloud Mountains in the Sawtooth National Recreation Area. The lake is accessed from Sawtooth National Forest trail 601.

Walker Lake is east of D. O. Lee Peak and downstream of several other lakes including:

- Boulder Lake
- Cirque Lake
- Cove Lake
- Gentian Lake
- Hook Lake
- Neck Lake
- Sapphire Lake
- Sheep Lake
- Slide Lake
- Snow Lake

== See also ==
- List of lakes of the White Cloud Mountains
- Sawtooth National Recreation Area
- White Cloud Mountains
