= Big Boulder Lakes =

Alpine lakes in the state of Idaho

The Big Boulder Lakes are a chain of thirteen small alpine and glacial Paternoster lakes in Custer County, Idaho, United States, located in the White Cloud Mountains in the Sawtooth National Recreation Area. The lakes are located in the upper portion of the Big Boulder Creek watershed east of D. O. Lee Peak. In addition to the lakes listed, the Big Boulder Lakes include the four small lakes that make up The Kettles. Sawtooth National Forest trail 601 along leads to the Big Boulder Lakes.

Big Boulder Lakes
Lake	Elevation	Max. length	Max. width	Location
Big Boulder Lake 1	2,985 m (9,793 ft)	085 m (279 ft)	040 m (130 ft)	
Big Boulder Lake 2	3,065 m (10,056 ft)	070 m (230 ft)	035 m (115 ft)	
Boulder Lake	3,065 m (10,056 ft)	200 m (660 ft)	085 m (279 ft)	
Cirque Lake	3,070 m (10,070 ft)	350 m (1,150 ft)	315 m (1,033 ft)	
Cove Lake	3,005 m (9,859 ft)	490 m (1,610 ft)	315 m (1,033 ft)	
Gentian Lake	3,060 m (10,040 ft)	100 m (330 ft)	080 m (260 ft)	
Hook Lake	3,025 m (9,925 ft)	150 m (490 ft)	070 m (230 ft)	
Sapphire Lake	3,020 m (9,910 ft)	500 m (1,600 ft)	300 m (980 ft)	
Snow Lake	3,055 m (10,023 ft)	310 m (1,020 ft)	115 m (377 ft)	

== See also ==
- List of lakes of the White Cloud Mountains
- Sawtooth National Forest
- Sawtooth National Recreation Area
- White Cloud Mountains

44.101112°N 114.603928°W 44.098845°N 114.612483°W 44.098166°N 114.614038°W 44.107052°N 114.620724°W 44.101346°N 114.608703°W 44.097145°N 114.612036°W 44.104628°N 114.607614°W 44.102962°N 114.614970°W 44.095896°N 114.613812°W
