= Shallow Lake =

Lake in Idaho, USA

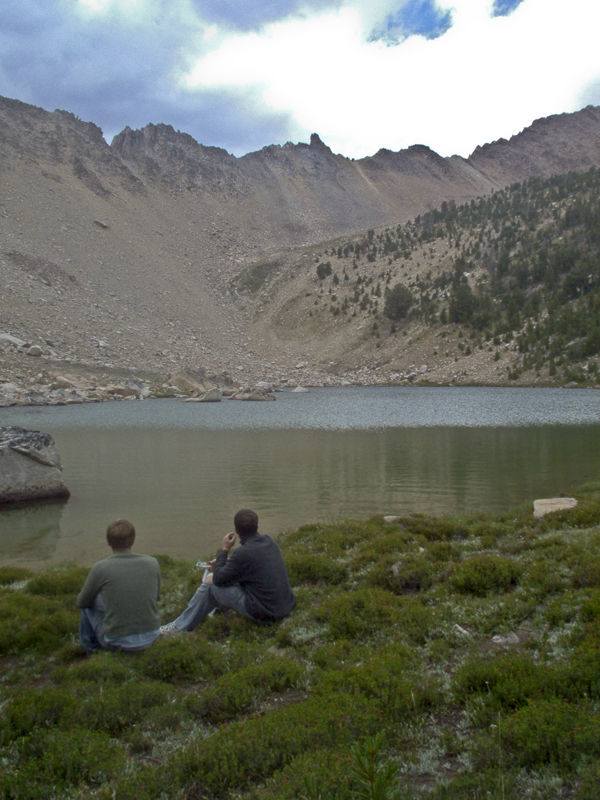
- Shallow Lake

- Location within Idaho Location within the United States
- Location: Custer County, Idaho
- Coordinates: 44°03′48″N 114°35′57″W
- Type: Glacial
- Primary outflows: Little Boulder Creek to East Fork Salmon River
- Basin countries: United States
- Max. length: 260 m (850 ft)
- Max. width: 96 m (315 ft)
- Surface elevation: 2,940 m (9,650 ft)

Shallow Lake is an alpine lake in Custer County, Idaho, United States, located in the White Cloud Mountains in the Sawtooth National Recreation Area. While no trails lead to the lake, it can be accessed from Sawtooth National Forest trail 047.

Shallow Lake is northeast of Merriam Peak and upstream of Baker Lake, Noisy Lakes, and Scree Lakes.

== See also ==
- List of lakes of the White Cloud Mountains
- Sawtooth National Recreation Area
- White Cloud Mountains
