= Fourth of July (disambiguation) =

Fourth of July is the colloquial name for Independence Day, a federal holiday in the United States.

Fourth of July or 4th of July may also refer to:

- July 4, the date

== Music ==
- Fourth of July (band), an American musical group
- "4th of July" (Amy Macdonald song) (2012)
- "4th of July" (The Beach Boys song) (1993)
- "4th of July" (U2 song) (1984)
- "4th of July (Fireworks)", a 2010 song by Kelis
- "Fourth of July", a song by Dave Alvin from Romeo's Escape
- "Fourth of July", a song by Mariah Carey from Butterfly
- "Fourth of July", a song by Fall Out Boy from American Beauty/American Psycho
- "Fourth of July", a song by Galaxie 500 from This Is Our Music
- "Fourth of July", a song by Sufjan Stevens from Carrie & Lowell
- "4th of July", a song by Shooter Jennings from Put the "O" Back in Country
- "4th of July", a song by Soundgarden from Superunknown
- "4th of July", a song by X from See How We Are

== Places ==
- Fourth of July Creek, numerous streams
- Fourth of July Lake, an alpine lake in Custer County, Idaho
- Fourth of July Peak, a mountain peak in Idaho
- Fourth of July Summit, a summit and mountain pass in Idaho

== Film and television ==
- Fourth of July (film), a 2022 American comedy-drama film
- "Fourth of July" (Saved by the Bell), a 1991 television episode
- "4th of July/Regatta", an episode of Tugs

== Other uses ==
- 4th of July (novel), a 2005 novel by James Patterson
- Fourth of July tomato, a common cultivar of tomato plants

== See also ==
- "4th of July, Asbury Park (Sandy)", a song by Bruce Springsteen
- July 4 (disambiguation)
- Independence Day (disambiguation)
- Born on the Fourth of July (film)
