= Crater Lake (Idaho) =

Alpine lake in Custer County, Idaho

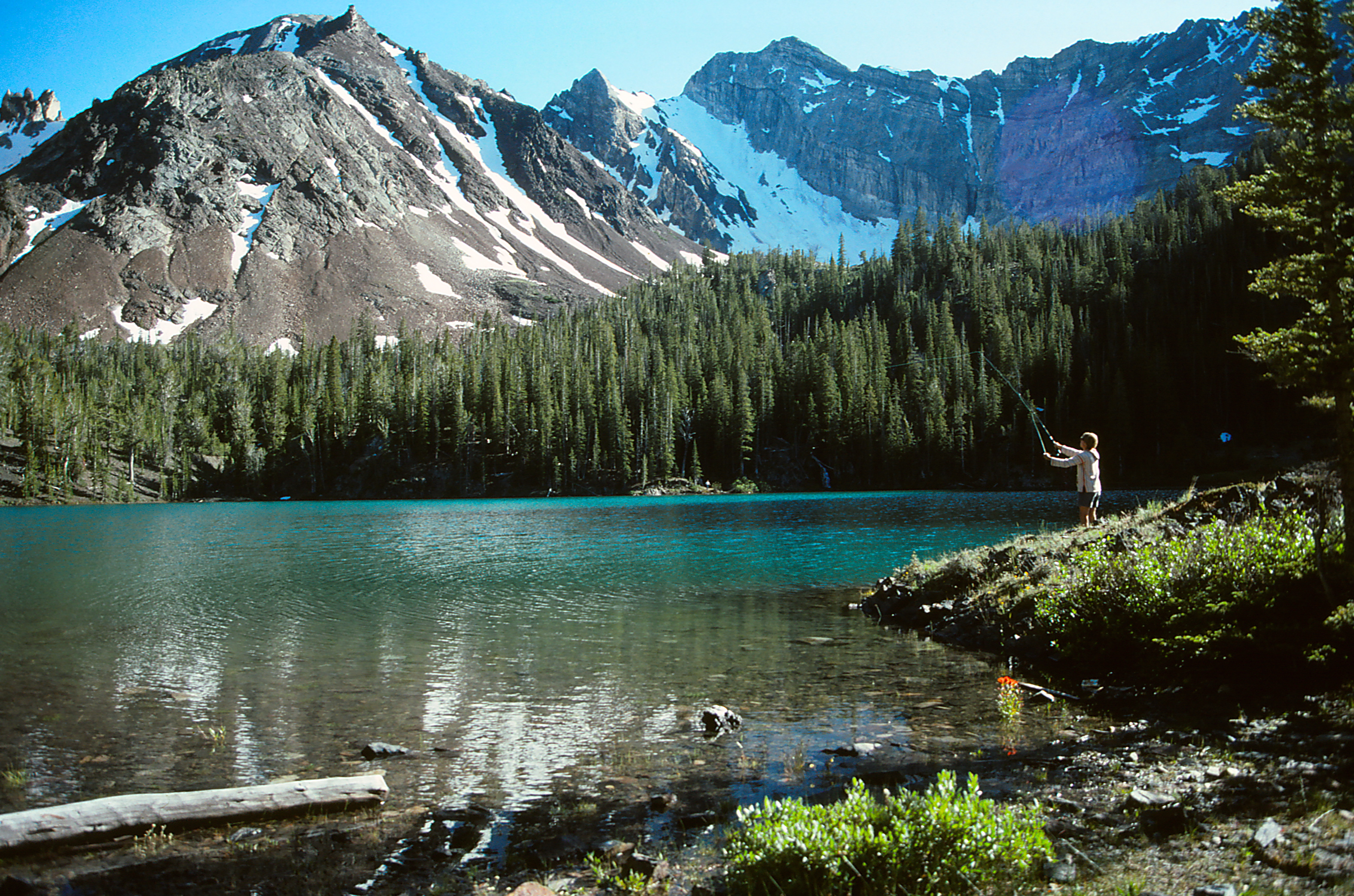

- Location within Idaho Location within the United States
- Location: Custer County, Idaho
- Coordinates: 44°08′32″N 114°36′31″W
- Lake type: Glacial
- Primary outflows: Livingston Creek to Salmon River
- Basin countries: United States
- Max. length: 410 m (1,350 ft)
- Max. width: 225 m (738 ft)
- Surface elevation: 2,737 m (8,980 ft)

Crater Lake is an alpine lake in Custer County, Idaho, United States, located in the White Cloud Mountains in the Sawtooth National Recreation Area. The lake is accessed from an old dirt road along Livingston Creek.

Crater Lake is just north of the Chinese Wall and is surrounded by several old mines.

== See also ==
- List of lakes of the White Cloud Mountains
- Sawtooth National Recreation Area
- White Cloud Mountains
