= Glacier Lake (Custer County, Idaho) =

Alpine lake in the state of Idaho

- Location within Idaho Location within the United States
- Location: Custer County, Idaho
- Coordinates: 44.048311°N 114.611733°W
- Lake type: Glacial
- Part of: Four Lakes
- Primary outflows: Little Boulder Creek to East Fork Salmon River
- Basin countries: United States
- Max. length: 90 m (300 ft)
- Max. width: 75 m (246 ft)
- Surface elevation: 3,050 m (10,010 ft)

Glacier Lake is an alpine lake in Custer County, Idaho, United States, located in the White Cloud Mountains in the Sawtooth National Recreation Area. While no trails lead to the lake, it can be accessed from Sawtooth National Forest trail 047.

Glacier Lake is northeast of Merriam Peak and upstream of Baker Lake, Cornice, Emerald, Quiet, Noisy, and Rock Lakes.

== See also ==
- List of lakes of the White Cloud Mountains
