= Tin Cup Lake =

Alpine lake in the state of Idaho

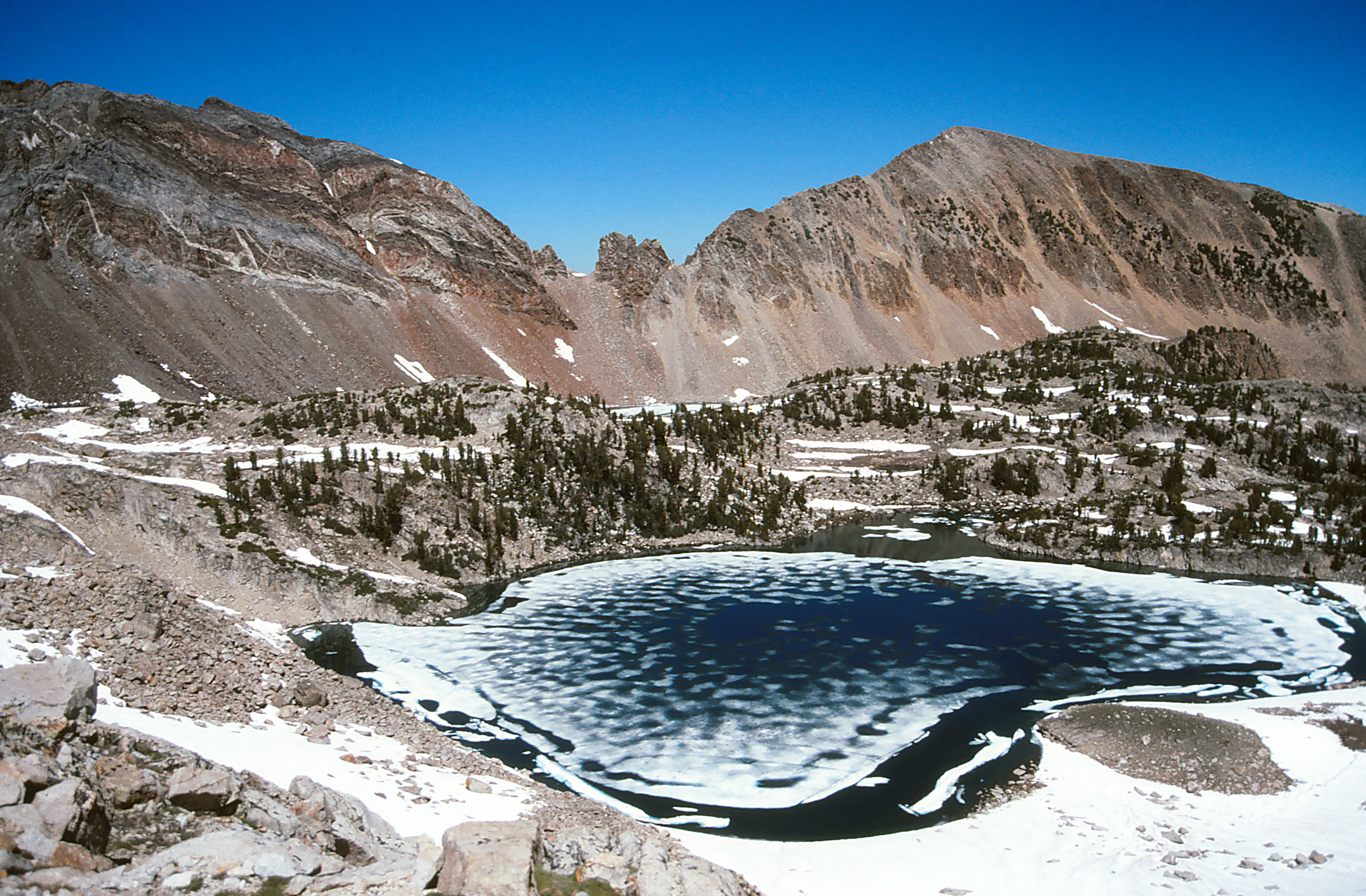

- Location within Idaho Location within the United States
- Location: Custer County, Idaho
- Coordinates: 44°07′22″N 114°36′35″W
- Type: Glacial
- Primary outflows: Gunsight Creek to Big Boulder Creek to East Fork Salmon River
- Basin countries: United States
- Max. length: 305 m (1,001 ft)
- Max. width: 235 m (771 ft)
- Surface elevation: 3,050 m (10,010 ft)

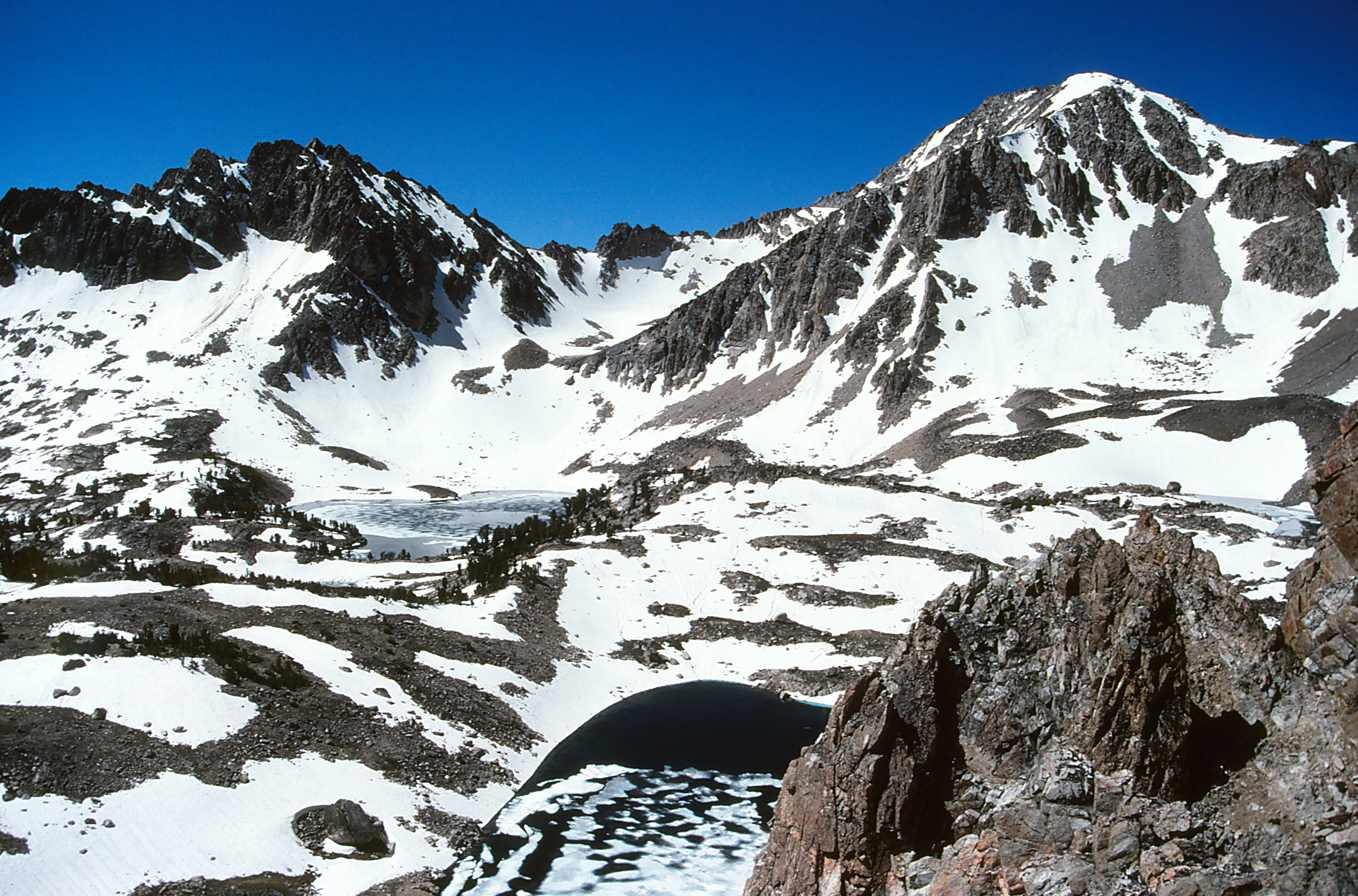
Tin Cup Lake at middle-left of photo with Gunsight lake and Calkins Peak

Tin Cup Lake is an alpine lake in Custer County, Idaho, United States, located in the White Cloud Mountains in the Sawtooth National Recreation Area. No trails lead to the lake, but it can be accessed from Sawtooth National Forest trail 680.

Tin Cup Lake is just southeast of the Chinese Wall, northeast of Calkins Peak, and in the same basin as Dike, Quartzite, and Gunsight Lakes.

== See also ==
- List of lakes of the White Cloud Mountains
- Sawtooth National Recreation Area
- White Cloud Mountains
