= Gunsight Lake (Idaho) =

Alpine lake in the state of Idaho

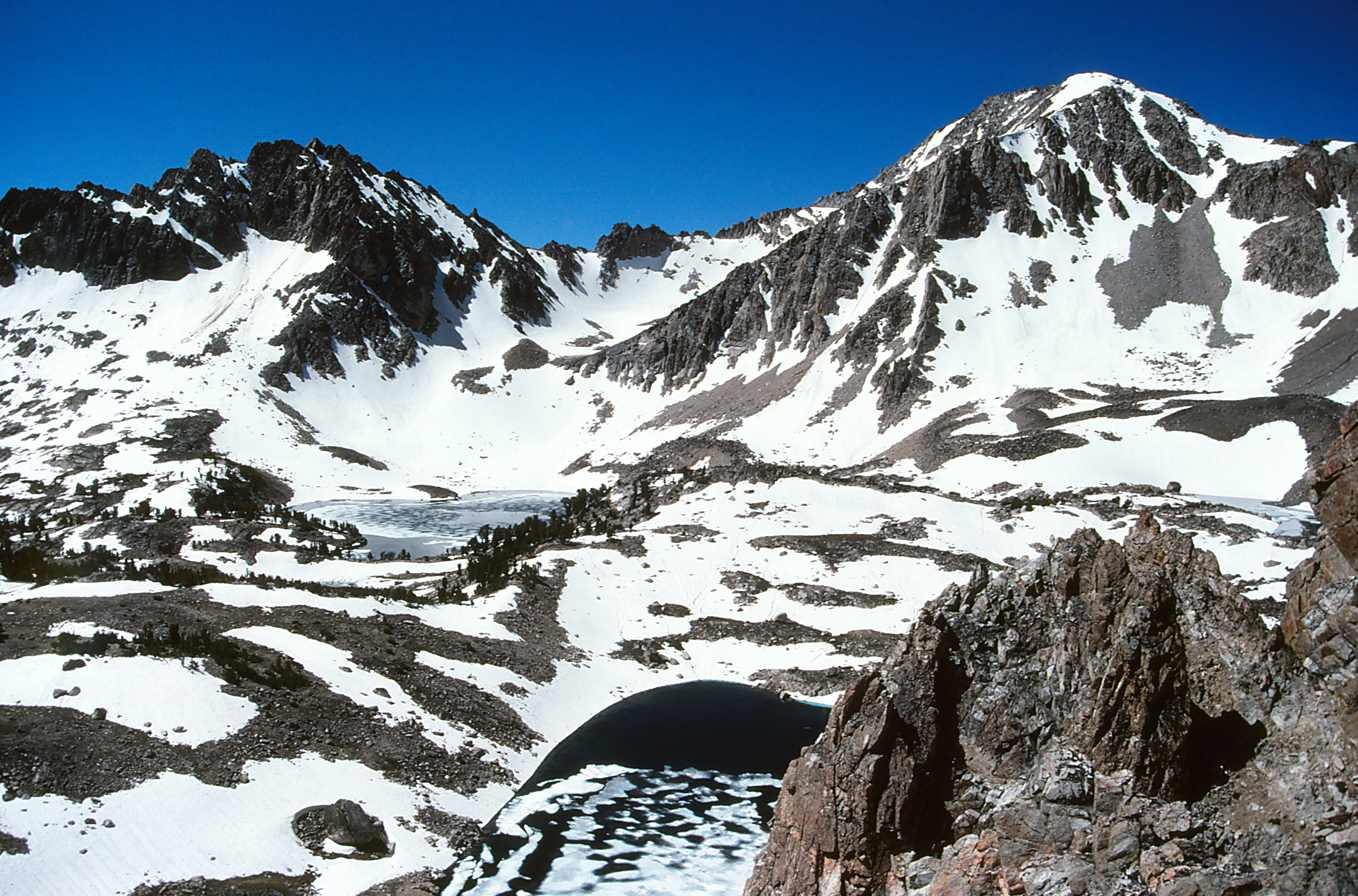
- Gunsight Lake at lower part of photo with Tin Cup Lake and Calkins Peak

- Location within Idaho Location within the United States
- Location: Custer County, Idaho
- Coordinates: 44°07′38″N 114°36′28″W
- Lake type: Glacial
- Primary outflows: Gunsight Creek to Big Boulder Creek to East Fork Salmon River
- Basin countries: United States
- Max. length: 300 m (980 ft)
- Max. width: 145 m (476 ft)
- Surface elevation: 3,070 m (10,070 ft)

Gunsight Lake is an alpine lake in Custer County, Idaho, United States, located in the White Cloud Mountains in the Sawtooth National Recreation Area. No trails lead to lake but it can be accessed from Sawtooth National Forest trail 680.

Gunsight Lake is just southeast of the Chinese Wall and in the same basin as Dike, Quartzite, and Tin Cup Lakes.

== See also ==
- List of lakes of the White Cloud Mountains
- Sawtooth National Recreation Area
- White Cloud Mountains
