= Champion Lakes =

Champion Lakes may refer to:

- Champion Lakes, Western Australia, suburb of Perth, Western Australia
- Champion Lakes (Idaho), chain of lakes in Custer County, Idaho
- Champion Lakes Provincial Park, provincial park in the West Kootenay region of British Columbia, Canada
