= Dike Lake =

Alpine lake in the state of Idaho

- Location within Idaho Location within the United States
- Location: Custer County, Idaho
- Coordinates: 44°07′35″N 114°36′45″W
- Lake type: Glacial
- Primary outflows: Gunsight Creek to Big Boulder Creek to East Fork Salmon River
- Basin countries: United States
- Max. length: 165 m (541 ft)
- Max. width: 65 m (213 ft)
- Surface elevation: 3,090 m (10,140 ft)

Dike Lake is an alpine lake in Custer County, Idaho, United States, located in the White Cloud Mountains in the Sawtooth National Recreation Area. No trails lead to lake but it can be accessed from Sawtooth National Forest trail 680.

Dike Lake is just southeast of the Chinese Wall, northeast of Calkins Peak, and in the same basin as Gunsight, Quartzite, and Tin Cup Lakes.

== See also ==
- List of lakes of the White Cloud Mountains
- Sawtooth National Recreation Area
- White Cloud Mountains
