= Four Lakes (Idaho) =

Alpine lakes in the state of Idaho

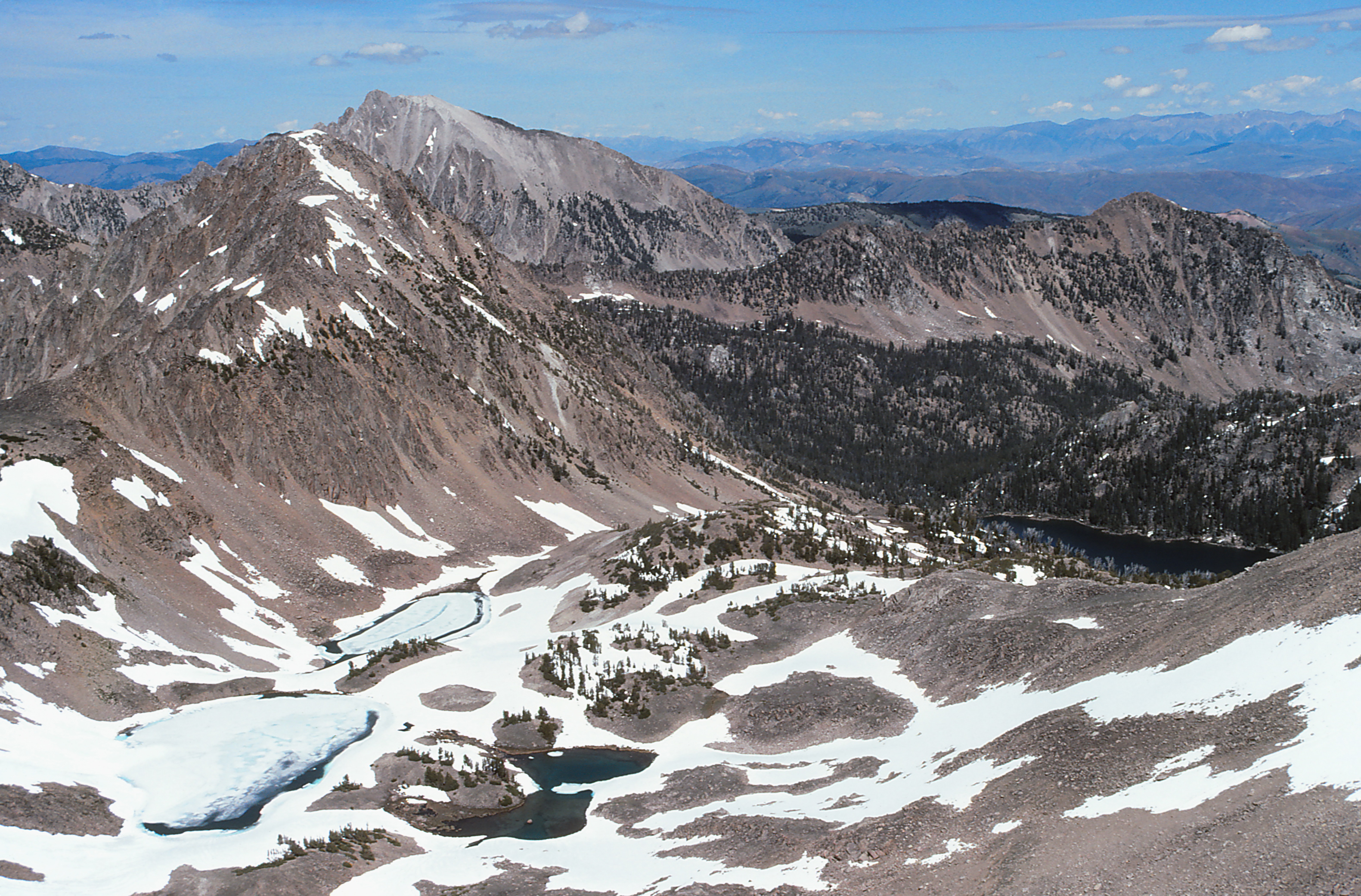
- Three of the four lakes (excluding Glacier Lake) in the Four Lakes Basin at lower left with Quiet Lake at right

- Location within Idaho Location within the United States
- Interactive map of Four Lakes
- Location: Sawtooth National Recreation Area; Custer County, Idaho
- Type: Alpine glacial lakes
- Etymology: White Cloud Mountains
- Part of: Little Boulder Creek watershed
- Basin countries: United States
- Managing agency: National Park Service
- Max. length: 300–702 feet (91–214 m)
- Max. width: 226–460 feet (69–140 m)
- Surface elevation: 9,880–10,010 feet (3,010–3,050 m)

The Four Lakes are a chain of four small glacial Paternoster lakes in Custer County, Idaho, United States, located in the White Cloud Mountains in the Sawtooth National Recreation Area. The lakes are located in the upper portion of the Little Boulder Creek watershed upstream of Quiet Lake and east of Patterson Peak. No trails lead to the Four Lakes Basin.

Four Lakes
Lake	Elevation	Max. length	Max. width	Location
Cornice Lake	3,010 m (9,880 ft)	187 m (614 ft)	080 m (260 ft)	
Emerald Lake	3,020 m (9,910 ft)	214 m (702 ft)	140 m (460 ft)	
Glacier Lake	3,050 m (10,010 ft)	090 m (300 ft)	075 m (246 ft)	
Rock Lake	3,025 m (9,925 ft)	120 m (390 ft)	069 m (226 ft)	

== See also ==
- List of lakes of the White Cloud Mountains
- Sawtooth National Forest
- Sawtooth National Recreation Area
- White Cloud Mountains

44.052713°N 114.607164°W 44.051267°N 114.609737°W 44.051267°N 114.611733°W 44.049873°N 114.608869°W
