= List of lakes of the White Cloud Mountains =

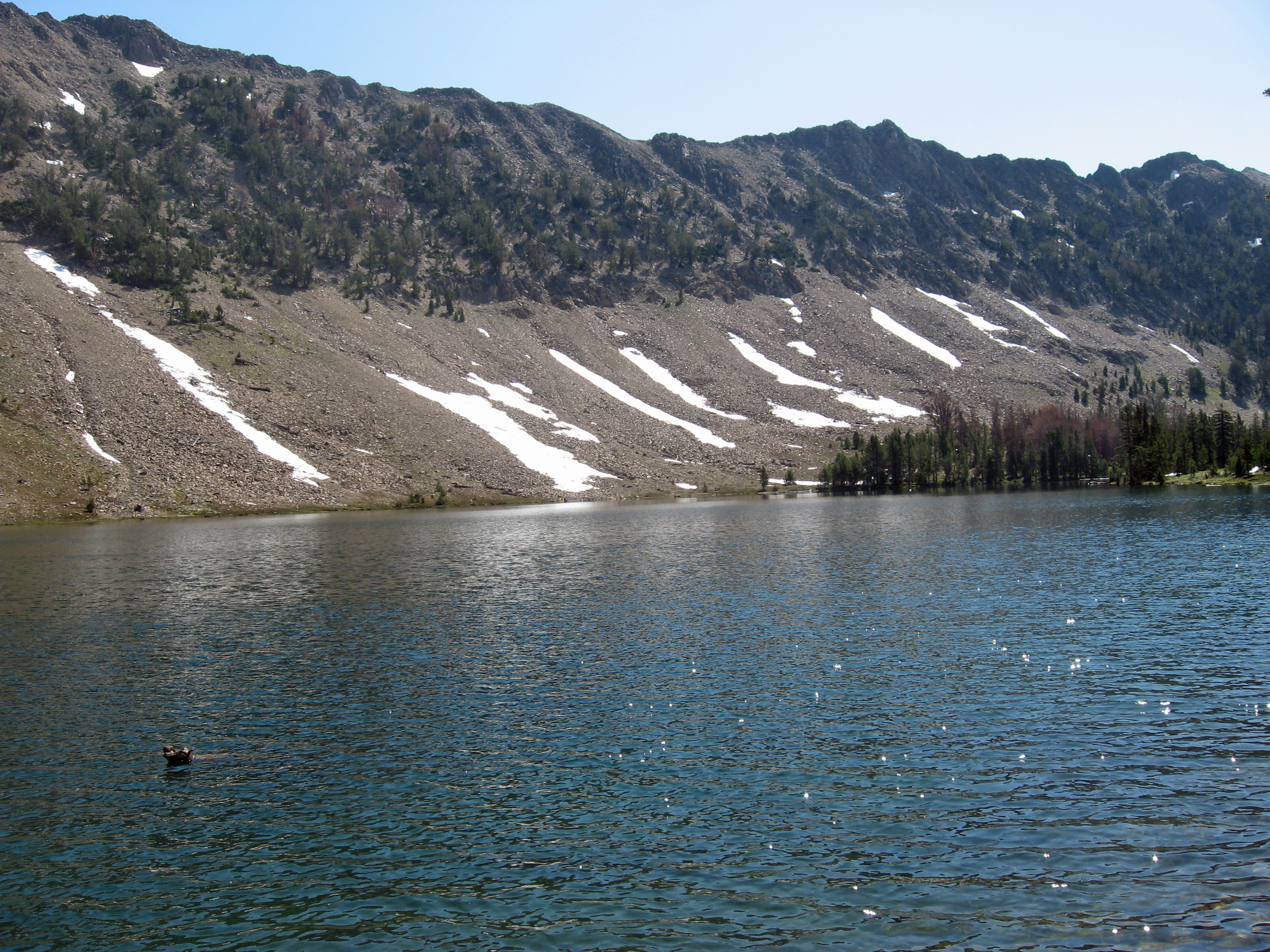
Washington Lake

The lakes of the White Cloud Mountains are located within the Sawtooth National Recreation Area of Custer County, Idaho. There are hundreds of lakes in the mountains, and most of the lakes were created by alpine glaciers. Many of the lakes are small and unnamed.

== Lake chains of the White Cloud Mountains ==
Lake chains of the White Cloud Mountains
Lake chain	Lowest Elevation	Number of Lakes	Location	Primary Outflow	
Big Boulder Lakes	9,268 ft 2825 m		13	44.102628°N 114.614659°W	Big Boulder Creek
Born Lakes	9,219 ft 2810 m		11	44.060205°N 114.616507°W	Warm Springs Creek
Boulder Chain Lakes	8,727 ft 2660 m		13	44.070998°N 114.575302°W	Little Boulder Creek
Casino Lakes	8,629 ft 2630 m		4	44.173155°N 114.816229°W	Big Casino Creek
Chamberlain Basin	9,186 ft 2800 m		10	44.031554°N 114.602525°W	Chamberlain Creek
Champion Lakes	8,596 ft 2620 m		7	44.005256°N 114.691043°W	Champion Creek
Four Lakes	9,875 ft 3010 m		4	44.051240°N 114.609345°W	Little Boulder Creek
Garland Lakes	8,629 ft 2630 m		8	44.165917°N 114.793334°W	Garland Creek
The Kettles	10,253 ft 3125 m		4	44.102505°N 114.622994°W	Big Boulder Creek
Six Lakes	9,039 ft 2755 m		6	44.022631°N 114.672119°W	Fourth of July Creek

== Lakes of the White Cloud Mountains ==
Lakes of the White Cloud Mountains
Lake	Elevation	Max. length	Max. width	Location	Primary Outflow
Baker Lake	2,585 m (8,481 ft)	192 m (630 ft)	155 m (509 ft)	44.056704°N 114.564083°W	Little Boulder Creek
Bear Lake	2,720 m (8,920 ft)	120 m (390 ft)	070 m (230 ft)	44.137826°N 114.694503°W	Warm Springs Creek
Boulder Lake	3,065 m (10,056 ft)	200 m (660 ft)	085 m (279 ft)	44.098166°N 114.614038°W	Big Boulder Creek
Castle Lake	2,875 m (9,432 ft)	288 m (945 ft)	266 m (873 ft)	44.046299°N 114.576598°W	Little Boulder Creek
Cirque Lake	3,070 m (10,070 ft)	350 m (1,150 ft)	315 m (1,033 ft)	44.107052°N 114.620724°W	Big Boulder Creek
Cornice Lake	3,010 m (9,880 ft)	187 m (614 ft)	080 m (260 ft)	44.052713°N 114.607164°W	Little Boulder Creek
Cove Lake	3,005 m (9,859 ft)	490 m (1,610 ft)	315 m (1,033 ft)	44.101346°N 114.608703°W	Big Boulder Creek
Crater Lake	2,737 m (8,980 ft)	410 m (1,350 ft)	225 m (738 ft)	44.142215°N 114.608673°W	Livingston Creek
Dike Lake	3,090 m (10,140 ft)	165 m (541 ft)	065 m (213 ft)	44.126350°N 114.612531°W	Gunsight Creek
Emerald Lake	3,020 m (9,910 ft)	214 m (702 ft)	140 m (460 ft)	44.051267°N 114.609737°W	Little Boulder Creek
Fourth of July Lake	2,860 m (9,380 ft)	275 m (902 ft)	183 m (600 ft)	44.043196°N 114.631105°W	Fourth of July Creek
Frog Lake	2,710 m (8,890 ft)	340 m (1,120 ft)	210 m (690 ft)	44.079050°N 114.545673°W	Little Boulder Creek
Gentian Lake	3,060 m (10,040 ft)	100 m (330 ft)	080 m (260 ft)	44.097145°N 114.612036°W	Big Boulder Creek
Glacier Lake	3,050 m (10,010 ft)	090 m (300 ft)	075 m (246 ft)	44.048311°N 114.611733°W	Little Boulder Creek
Goat Lake	2,730 m (8,960 ft)	275 m (902 ft)	240 m (790 ft)	44.098741°N 114.581212°W	Big Boulder Creek
Gunsight Lake	3,070 m (10,070 ft)	300 m (980 ft)	145 m (476 ft)	44.127237°N 114.607704°W	Gunsight Creek
Hatchet Lake	2,710 m (8,890 ft)	345 m (1,132 ft)	305 m (1,001 ft)	44.068840°N 114.562724°W	Little Boulder Creek
Headwall Lake	2,975 m (9,760 ft)	256 m (840 ft)	162 m (531 ft)	44.074340°N 114.598370°W	Little Boulder Creek
Heart Lake	2,705 m (8,875 ft)	395 m (1,296 ft)	182 m (597 ft)	44.029222°N 114.677952°W	Fourth of July Creek
Hidden Lake	2,905 m (9,531 ft)	350 m (1,150 ft)	212 m (696 ft)	44.078929°N 114.595631°W	Little Boulder Creek
Hoodoo Lake	2,645 m (8,678 ft)	215 m (705 ft)	150 m (490 ft)	44.019525°N 114.641681°W	Slate Creek
Hook Lake	3,025 m (9,925 ft)	150 m (490 ft)	070 m (230 ft)	44.104628°N 114.607614°W	Big Boulder Creek
Hourglass Lake	2,900 m (9,500 ft)	224 m (735 ft)	118 m (387 ft)	44.077962°N 114.588440°W	Little Boulder Creek
Hummock Lake	2,905 m (9,531 ft)	490 m (1,610 ft)	242 m (794 ft)	44.077480°N 114.592172°W	Little Boulder Creek
Island Lake	2,825 m (9,268 ft)	400 m (1,300 ft)	125 m (410 ft)	44.095109°N 114.594083°W	Big Boulder Creek
Jimmy Smith Lake	1,930 m (6,330 ft)	895 m (2,936 ft)	255 m (837 ft)	44.168560°N 114.401540°W	Big Lake Creek
Little Frog Lake	2,705 m (8,875 ft)	153 m (502 ft)	083 m (272 ft)	44.079859°N 114.541815°W	Little Boulder Creek
Little Redfish Lake	2,680 m (8,790 ft)	130 m (430 ft)	110 m (360 ft)	44.103883°N 114.536108°W	Big Boulder Creek
Lodgepole Lake	2,750 m (9,020 ft)	320 m (1,050 ft)	295 m (968 ft)	44.070403°N 114.575526°W	Little Boulder Creek
Lonesome Lake	3,185 m (10,449 ft)	458 m (1,503 ft)	178 m (584 ft)	44.073839°N 114.607106°W	Little Boulder Creek
Neck Lake	3,060 m (10,040 ft)	075 m (246 ft)	035 m (115 ft)	44.113370°N 114.616699°W	Bighorn Creek
Noisy Lake	2,745 m (9,006 ft)	420 m (1,380 ft)	185 m (607 ft)	44.057888°N 114.583611°W	Little Boulder Creek
Ocalkens Lake	2,759 m (9,052 ft)	400 m (1,300 ft)	280 m (920 ft)	44.124600°N 114.640483°W	Slate Creek
Phyllis Lake	2,800 m (9,200 ft)	270 m (890 ft)	158 m (518 ft)	44.022839°N 114.648798°W	Fourth of July Creek
Quartzite Lake	3,045 m (9,990 ft)	145 m (476 ft)	050 m (160 ft)	44.123483°N 114.605996°W	Gunsight Creek
Quiet Lake	2,820 m (9,250 ft)	546 m (1,791 ft)	330 m (1,080 ft)	44.054689°N 114.593090°W	Little Boulder Creek
Rainbow Lake	2,595 m (8,514 ft)	095 m (312 ft)	081 m (266 ft)	43.986009°N 114.721970°W	Champion Creek
Rock Lake	3,025 m (9,925 ft)	120 m (390 ft)	069 m (226 ft)	44.049873°N 114.608869°W	Little Boulder Creek
Rough Lake	2,715 m (8,907 ft)	365 m (1,198 ft)	219 m (719 ft)	44.184005°N 114.801201°W	Rough Creek
Sapphire Lake	3,020 m (9,910 ft)	500 m (1,600 ft)	300 m (980 ft)	44.102962°N 114.614970°W	Big Boulder Creek
Scoop Lake	2,945 m (9,662 ft)	276 m (906 ft)	156 m (512 ft)	44.073226°N 114.594253°W	Little Boulder Creek
Scree Lake	2,910 m (9,550 ft)	185 m (607 ft)	100 m (330 ft)	44.061649°N 114.595447°W	Little Boulder Creek
Shallow Lake	2,940 m (9,650 ft)	260 m (850 ft)	096 m (315 ft)	44.063415°N 114.599180°W	Little Boulder Creek
Sheep Lake	3,015 m (9,892 ft)	290 m (950 ft)	200 m (660 ft)	44.113590°N 114.609613°W	Bighorn Creek
Shelf Lake	2,730 m (8,960 ft)	275 m (902 ft)	166 m (545 ft)	44.070398°N 114.567814°W	Little Boulder Creek
Slide Lake	3,110 m (10,200 ft)	240 m (790 ft)	095 m (312 ft)	44.112318°N 114.611450°W	Bighorn Creek
Sliderock Lake	2,740 m (8,990 ft)	305 m (1,001 ft)	157 m (515 ft)	44.070568°N 114.571721°W	Little Boulder Creek
Snow Lake	3,055 m (10,023 ft)	310 m (1,020 ft)	115 m (377 ft)	44.095896°N 114.613812°W	Big Boulder Creek
Sullivan Lake	2,055 m (6,742 ft)	450 m (1,480 ft)	315 m (1,033 ft)	44.222726°N 114.444067°W	Sullivan Creek
Swimm Lake	2,702 m (8,865 ft)	465 m (1,526 ft)	240 m (790 ft)	44.148778°N 114.667739°W	Warm Springs Creek
Tin Cup Lake	3,050 m (10,010 ft)	305 m (1,001 ft)	235 m (771 ft)	44.122704°N 114.609613°W	Gunsight Creek
Tiny Lake	2,905 m (9,531 ft)	061 m (200 ft)	046 m (151 ft)	44.077179°N 114.589737°W	Little Boulder Creek
Walker Lake	2,820 m (9,250 ft)	570 m (1,870 ft)	225 m (738 ft)	44.106920°N 114.597314°W	Big Boulder Creek
Washington Lake	2,855 m (9,367 ft)	440 m (1,440 ft)	275 m (902 ft)	44.032118°N 114.621369°W	Washington Lake Creek
Waterdog Lake	2,660 m (8,730 ft)	060 m (200 ft)	025 m (82 ft)	44.072499°N 114.557543°W	Little Boulder Creek
Willow Lake	2,665 m (8,743 ft)	260 m (850 ft)	173 m (568 ft)	44.074092°N 114.560419°W	Little Boulder Creek

== See also ==
- Sawtooth National Forest
- Sawtooth National Recreation Area
