= Washington Lake (Idaho) =

Freshwater lake in the White Cloud Mountains

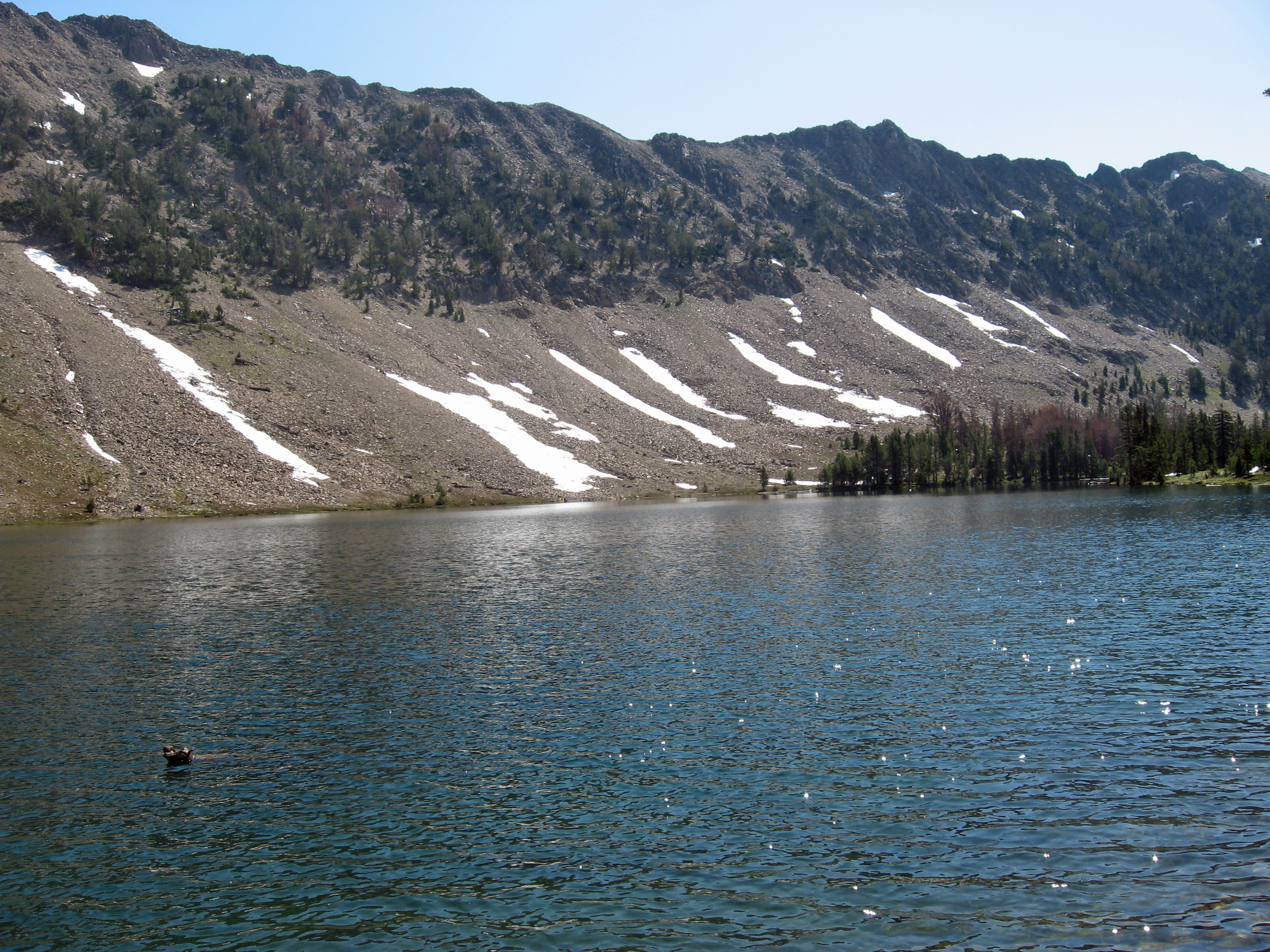
- Washington Lake

- Location within Idaho Location within the United States
- Location: Custer County, Idaho
- Coordinates: 44.032118°N 114.621369°W
- Type: Glacial
- Primary outflows: Washington Lake Creek to Germania Creek to East Fork Salmon River
- Basin countries: United States
- Max. length: 440 m (1,440 ft)
- Max. width: 275 m (902 ft)
- Surface elevation: 2,855 m (9,367 ft)

Washington Lake is an alpine lake in Custer County, Idaho, United States, located in the White Cloud Mountains in the Sawtooth National Recreation Area. The lake is accessed from Sawtooth National Forest trails 109 and 203.

Washington Lake is south of Patterson Peak and southeast of Fourth of July Lake, although it is in a separate basin.

Fish species commonly found in this lake are the invasive rainbow trout (Oncorhynchus mykiss) the cutthroat trout (Onchorhynchus clarkii), and a hybrid of the rainbow and cutthroat trouts referred to as Onchorhynchus mykiss x clarkii.

== See also ==
- List of lakes of the White Cloud Mountains
- Sawtooth National Recreation Area
- White Cloud Mountains
