= Cornice Lake =

Alpine lake in the state of Idaho

- Location within Idaho Location within the United States
- Location: Custer County, Idaho
- Coordinates: 44°03′10″N 114°36′26″W
- Lake type: Glacial
- Part of: Four Lakes
- Primary outflows: Little Boulder Creek to East Fork Salmon River
- Basin countries: United States
- Max. length: 187 m (614 ft)
- Max. width: 80 m (260 ft)
- Surface elevation: 3,010 m (9,880 ft)

Cornice Lake is an alpine lake in Custer County, Idaho, United States, located in the White Cloud Mountains in the Sawtooth National Recreation Area. The lake is in the Four Lakes Basin and is most easily accessed from Sawtooth National Forest trail 683.

Cornice Lake is just east of Patterson Peak and west of Castle and Merriam Peaks. It is downstream of Emerald, Rock, and Glacier Lakes and upstream of Quiet, Noisy, and Baker Lakes.

== See also ==
- List of lakes of the White Cloud Mountains
- Sawtooth National Recreation Area
- White Cloud Mountains
