= Heart Lake (White Cloud Mountains) =

Lake in Custer County, Idaho, United States

- Location within Idaho Location within the United States
- Location: Custer County, Idaho
- Coordinates: 44°01′45″N 114°40′41″W
- Lake type: Glacial
- Primary outflows: Fourth of July Creek to Salmon River
- Basin countries: United States
- Max. length: 396 m (1,299 ft)
- Max. width: 182 m (597 ft)
- Surface elevation: 2,705 m (8,875 ft)

Heart Lake is an alpine lake in Custer County, Idaho, United States, located in the White Cloud Mountains in the Sawtooth National Recreation Area. No trail lead to the lake, but it is most easily accessed from Sawtooth National Forest road 209.

Heart Lake is north of Washington Peak and downhill of the Six Lakes Basin

== See also ==
- List of lakes of the White Cloud Mountains
- Sawtooth National Recreation Area
- White Cloud Mountains
