= Patterson Peak =

Patterson Peak can refer to the following mountains:

- Patterson Peak (Antarctica)
- Patterson Peak (Blaine County, Idaho)
- Patterson Peak (Custer County, Idaho)
- Patterson Peak (New Mexico) in Catron County
- Patterson Peak (Nevada) in Lincoln County
