= Rainbow Lake (White Cloud Mountains) =

Alpine lake in the state of Idaho

- Location within Idaho Location within the United States
- Location: Custer County, Idaho
- Coordinates: 43°59′10″N 114°43′19″W
- Type: Glacial
- Primary outflows: South Fork Champion Creek to Salmon River
- Basin countries: United States
- Max. length: 95 m (312 ft)
- Max. width: 81 m (266 ft)
- Surface elevation: 2,595 m (8,514 ft)

Rainbow Lake is an alpine lake in Custer County, Idaho, United States, located in the White Cloud Mountains in the Sawtooth National Recreation Area. The lake is accessed from Sawtooth National Forest trail 107.

Rainbow Lake is northeast of Horton Peak and southwest of the Champion Lakes, although in a separate sub-basin.

== See also ==
- List of lakes of the White Cloud Mountains
- Sawtooth National Recreation Area
- White Cloud Mountains
