= Castle Lake (Idaho) =

Lake in the state of Idaho

- Location within Idaho Location within the United States
- Location: Custer County, Idaho
- Coordinates: 44°02′47″N 114°34′36″W
- Lake type: Glacial
- Primary outflows: Little Boulder Creek to East Fork Salmon River
- Basin countries: United States
- Max. length: 288 m (945 ft)
- Max. width: 266 m (873 ft)
- Surface elevation: 2,875 m (9,432 ft)

Castle Lake is an alpine lake in Custer County, Idaho, United States, located in the White Cloud Mountains in the Sawtooth National Recreation Area. The lake is accessed from Sawtooth National Forest trail 047.

Castle Lake is just north of Castle Peak and south of Merriam Peak. It is upstream of Baker Lake.

== See also ==
- List of lakes of the White Cloud Mountains
- Sawtooth National Recreation Area
- White Cloud Mountains
