= Quiet Lake =

Alpine lake in the state of Idaho

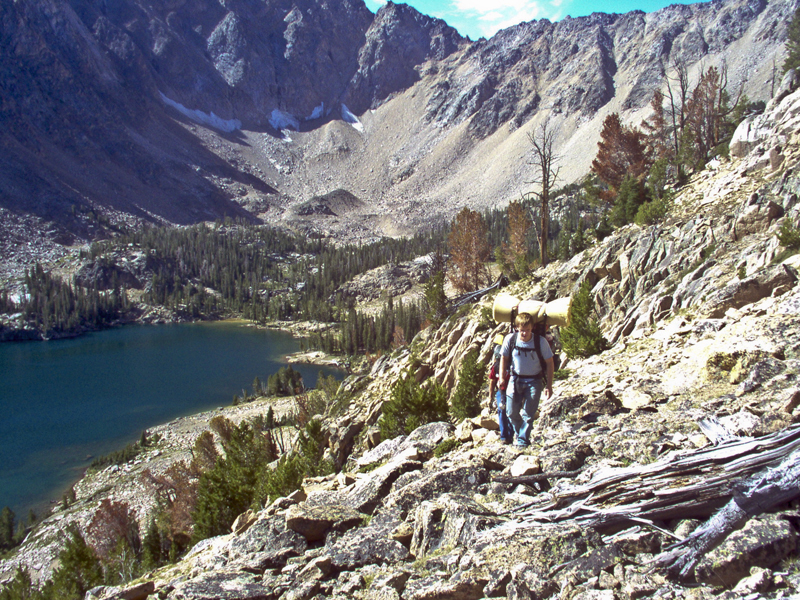
- Quiet Lake

- Location within Idaho Location within the United States
- Location: Custer County, Idaho
- Coordinates: 44°03′17″N 114°35′35″W
- Type: Glacial
- Primary outflows: Little Boulder Creek to East Fork Salmon River
- Basin countries: United States
- Max. length: 546 m (1,791 ft)
- Max. width: 330 m (1,080 ft)
- Surface elevation: 2,820 m (9,250 ft)

Quiet Lake is an alpine lake in Custer County, Idaho, United States, located in the White Cloud Mountains in the Sawtooth National Recreation Area. While no trails lead to the lake, it can be accessed from Sawtooth National Forest trail 047.

Quiet Lake is northeast of Merriam Peak, upstream of Baker and Noisy Lakes, and downstream of Cornice, Emerald, Glacier, and Rock Lakes.

== See also ==
- List of lakes of the White Cloud Mountains
- Sawtooth National Recreation Area
- White Cloud Mountains
