= Hook Lake =

Alpine lake in the state of Idaho

- Location within Idaho Location within the United States
- Location: Custer County, Idaho
- Coordinates: 44°06′17″N 114°36′27″W
- Lake type: Glacial
- Primary outflows: Big Boulder Creek to East Fork Salmon River
- Basin countries: United States
- Max. length: 150 m (490 ft)
- Max. width: 70 m (230 ft)
- Surface elevation: 3,025 m (9,925 ft)

Hook Lake is an alpine lake in Custer County, Idaho, United States, located in the White Cloud Mountains in the Sawtooth National Recreation Area. No trails lead to the lake, but it can be most easily accessed from Sawtooth National Forest trail 601.

Hook Lake is east of D. O. Lee Peak in the Big Boulder Lakes Basin along with Cove, Sapphire, and Cirque Lakes.

== See also ==
- List of lakes of the White Cloud Mountains
- Sawtooth National Recreation Area
- White Cloud Mountains
