= Baker Lake (Custer County, Idaho) =

Alpine lake in the state of Idaho

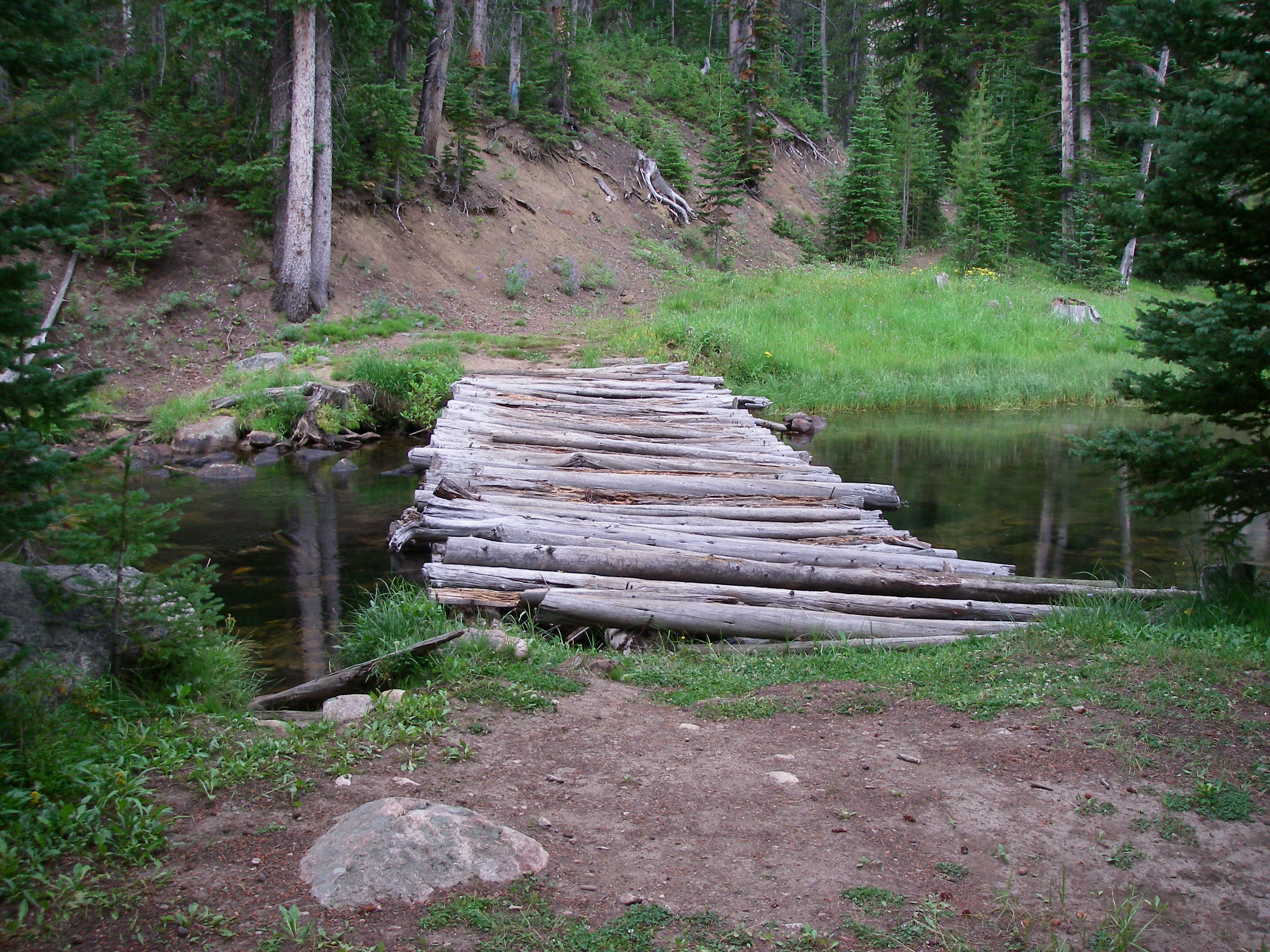
- Log bridge at Baker Lake

- Location within Idaho Location within the United States
- Location: Custer County, Idaho
- Coordinates: 44°03′24″N 114°33′51″W
- Type: Glacial
- Primary outflows: Little Boulder Creek to East Fork Salmon River
- Basin countries: United States
- Max. length: 630 ft (190 m)
- Max. width: 509 ft (155 m)
- Surface area: 7.7 acres (3.1 ha)
- Surface elevation: 8,468 ft (2,581 m)

Baker Lake is an alpine lake in Custer County, Idaho, United States, located in the White Cloud Mountains in the Sawtooth National Recreation Area. The name is derived from the fact that the lake is adjacent to mining claims held by the Baker family for many years.

Baker Lake is just east of Merriam Peak and downstream of several other lakes including Castle, Cornice, Emerald, Glacier, Noisy, Quiet, Rock, Scree, and Shallow Lakes. The lake is accessed from Sawtooth National Forest trail 047.

== See also ==
- List of lakes of the White Cloud Mountains
- Born Lakes
- Chamberlain Basin
- Sawtooth National Recreation Area
- White Cloud Mountains
