= Rough Lake =

Lake in Idaho, United States

- Location within Idaho Location within the United States
- Location: Custer County, Idaho
- Coordinates: 44°11′02″N 114°48′04″W
- Type: Glacial
- Primary outflows: Rough Creek to Salmon River
- Basin countries: United States
- Max. length: 365 m (1,198 ft)
- Max. width: 219 m (719 ft)
- Surface elevation: 2,715 m (8,907 ft)

Rough Lake is an alpine lake in Custer County, Idaho, United States, located in the White Cloud Mountains in the Sawtooth National Recreation Area. The lake is accessed from Sawtooth National Forest trails 647 and 616.

Rough Lake is north of the Casino Lakes and Garland Lakes and west of Lookout Mountain.

== See also ==
- List of lakes of the White Cloud Mountains
- Sawtooth National Recreation Area
- White Cloud Mountains
