= Phyllis Lake =

Alpine lake in the state of Idaho

- Location within Idaho Location within the United States
- Location: Custer County, Idaho
- Coordinates: 44°01′22″N 114°38′56″W
- Type: Glacial
- Primary outflows: Fourth of July Creek to Salmon River
- Basin countries: United States
- Max. length: 270 m (890 ft)
- Max. width: 158 m (518 ft)
- Surface elevation: 2,800 m (9,200 ft)

Phyllis Lake is an alpine lake in Custer County, Idaho, United States, located in the White Cloud Mountains in the Sawtooth National Recreation Area. The lake is accessed from Sawtooth National Forest road 053.

Phyllis Lake is northeast of Washington Peak.

== See also ==
- List of lakes of the White Cloud Mountains
