= Little Frog Lake =

Lake in Idaho, United States

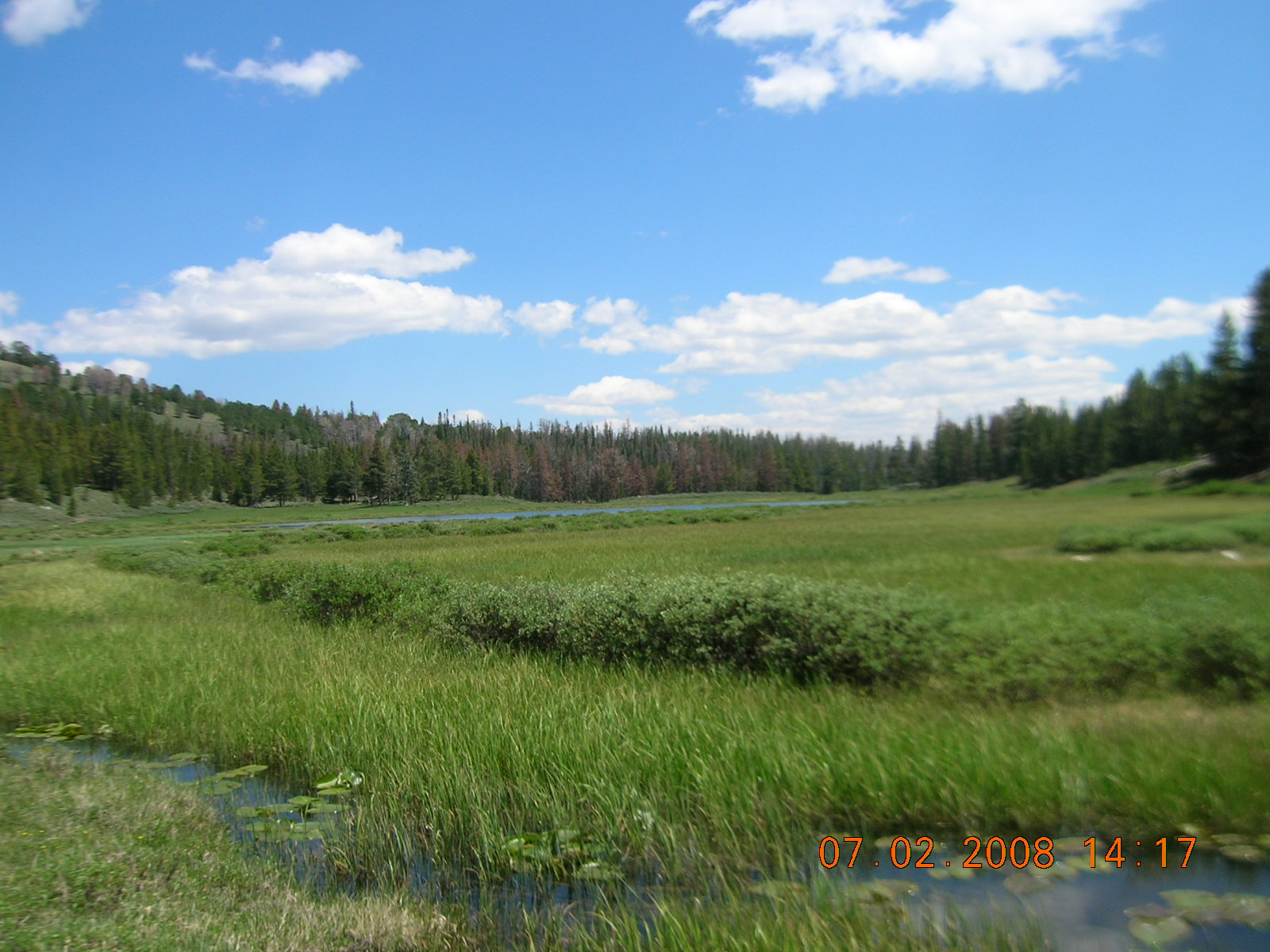

- Location within Idaho Location within the United States
- Location: Custer County, Idaho
- Coordinates: 44°04′47″N 114°32′31″W
- Type: Glacial
- Primary outflows: Little Boulder Creek to East Fork Salmon River
- Basin countries: United States
- Max. length: 153 m (502 ft)
- Max. width: 83 m (272 ft)
- Surface elevation: 2,705 m (8,875 ft)

Little Frog Lake is an alpine lake in Custer County, Idaho, United States, located in the White Cloud Mountains in the Sawtooth National Recreation Area. The lake is accessed from Sawtooth National Forest trail 047.

Little Frog Lake is just upstream of Frog Lake and surrounded by marshes, which support a large breeding area for Columbia Spotted Frog and Western toads.

== See also ==
- List of lakes of the White Cloud Mountains
- Sawtooth National Recreation Area
- White Cloud Mountains
