= Ocalkens Lake =

Lake in Idaho, United States

- Location within Idaho Location within the United States
- Location: Custer County, Idaho
- Coordinates: 44°07′29″N 114°38′26″W
- Type: Glacial
- Primary outflows: Slate Creek to Salmon River
- Basin countries: United States
- Max. length: 400 m (1,300 ft)
- Max. width: 280 m (920 ft)
- Surface elevation: 2,759 m (9,052 ft)

Ocalkens Lake is an alpine lake in Custer County, Idaho, United States, located in the White Cloud Mountains in the Sawtooth National Recreation Area. The lake is accessed from Sawtooth National Forest trail 674.

Ocalkens Lake is just east of Calkins Peak, southwest of the Chinese Wall, and north of D. O. Lee Peak.

== See also ==
- List of lakes of the White Cloud Mountains
- Sawtooth National Recreation Area
- White Cloud Mountains
