= July 4 (disambiguation) =

July 4 is the 185th or 186th day of the year in the Gregorian calendar. It may also refer to:

- July 4 (film), a 2007 Indian film
- July 4 (Eastern Orthodox liturgics), a date on the Easter Orthodox liturgical calendar

== See also ==
- Fourth of July (disambiguation)
- Independence Day (disambiguation)
