= Garland Lakes =

Alpine lakes in the state of Idaho

McGown Lakes
- Location within Idaho Location within the United States
- Interactive map of McGown Lakes
- Location: Sawtooth National Recreation Area; Custer County, Idaho
- Type: Alpine glacial lakes
- Part of: Big Casino Creek watershed
- Primary inflows: Precipitation
- Basin countries: United States
- Managing agency: National Park Service
- Max. length: 200–597 feet (61–182 m)
- Max. width: 72–499 feet (22–152 m)
- Surface elevation: 8,638–8,930 feet (2,633–2,722 m)

The Garland Lakes are a chain of eight small alpine glacial lakes and several former lakes in Custer County, Idaho, United States, located in the White Cloud Mountains in the Sawtooth National Recreation Area. The lakes are located on the upper portion of the Big Casino Creek watershed, a tributary of the Salmon River. The lakes have not been individually named, and Sawtooth National Forest trails 646 and 616 lead to the lakes. The Garland Lakes are south of Rough Lake and east of the Casino Lakes.

Garland Lakes
Lake	Elevation	Max. length	Max. width	Location
Garland Lake 1	2,696 m (8,845 ft)	060 m (200 ft)	053 m (174 ft)	
Garland Lake 2	2,720 m (8,920 ft)	116 m (381 ft)	072 m (236 ft)	
Garland Lake 3	2,722 m (8,930 ft)	098 m (322 ft)	049 m (161 ft)	
Garland Lake 4	2,633 m (8,638 ft)	082 m (269 ft)	072 m (236 ft)	
Garland Lake 5	2,669 m (8,757 ft)	065 m (213 ft)	035 m (115 ft)	
Garland Lake 6	2,696 m (8,845 ft)	157 m (515 ft)	152 m (499 ft)	
Garland Lake 7	2,698 m (8,852 ft)	077 m (253 ft)	022 m (72 ft)	
Garland Lake 8	2,706 m (8,878 ft)	182 m (597 ft)	115 m (377 ft)	

== See also ==
- List of lakes of the White Cloud Mountains
- Sawtooth National Forest
- Sawtooth National Recreation Area
- White Cloud Mountains

44.174716°N 114.797440°W 44.175762°N 114.801073°W 44.177733°N 114.798596°W 44.165089°N 114.782453°W 44.165492°N 114.787167°W 44.160769°N 114.783280°W 44.160726°N 114.785673°W 44.165327°N 114.793611°W
