= Island Lake (White Cloud Mountains) =

Lake in Custer County, Idaho, United States

- Location within Idaho Location within the United States
- Location: Custer County, Idaho
- Coordinates: 44°05′42″N 114°35′39″W
- Lake type: Glacial
- Primary outflows: Big Boulder Creek to East Fork Salmon River
- Basin countries: United States
- Max. length: 400 m (1,300 ft)
- Max. width: 125 m (410 ft)
- Surface elevation: 2,525 m (8,284 ft)
- Islands: 1

Island Lake is an alpine lake in Custer County, Idaho, United States, located in the White Cloud Mountains in the Sawtooth National Recreation Area. The lake is accessed from Sawtooth National Forest trail 806.

Island Lake is southwest of D. O. Lee Peak and southwest of Goat Lake, although not in the same sub-basin. There is one small island on the lake near the eastern shore.

== See also ==
- List of lakes of the White Cloud Mountains
- Sawtooth National Recreation Area
- White Cloud Mountains
