= Jimmy Smith Lake =

Landslide-dammed lake in central Idaho

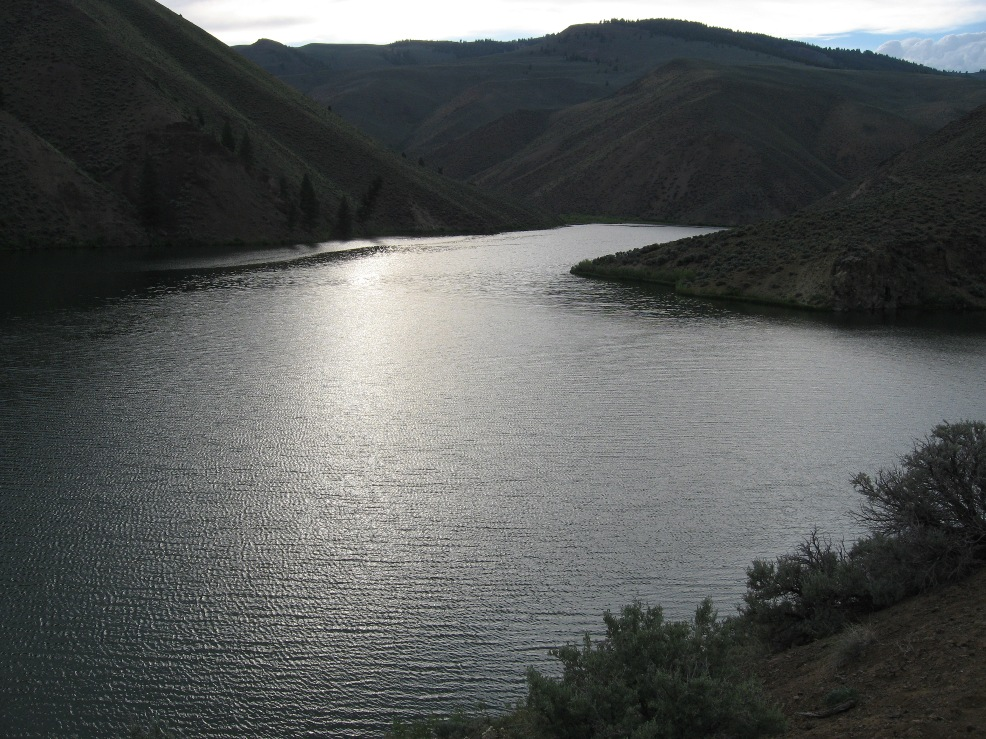
- Jimmy Smith Lake

- Location within Idaho Location within the United States
- Location: Custer County, Idaho
- Coordinates: 44.168560°N 114.401540°W
- Type: Ancient landslide
- Primary inflows: Big Lake Creek
- Primary outflows: Big Lake Creek to East Fork Salmon River
- Basin countries: United States
- Max. length: 895 m (2,936 ft)
- Max. width: 355 m (1,165 ft)
- Surface elevation: 1,930 m (6,330 ft)

Jimmy Smith Lake is an alpine lake in Custer County, Idaho, United States, located at the northeast end of the White Cloud Mountains on the Bureau of Land Management land just east and downstream of the Sawtooth National Recreation Area border. The lake is accessed from trail 677, which is a 1-mile (1.6 km) improved ATV trail along Big Lake Creek, but there is no motorized vehicle access beyond the lake.

Jimmy Smith Lake gives the appearance that it is a reservoir. However, it was formed by an ancient landslide. The lake is stocked with rainbow trout, which makes it a popular year-round fishing destination for locals. A dispersed camping area and vault toilet are located at the trailhead.

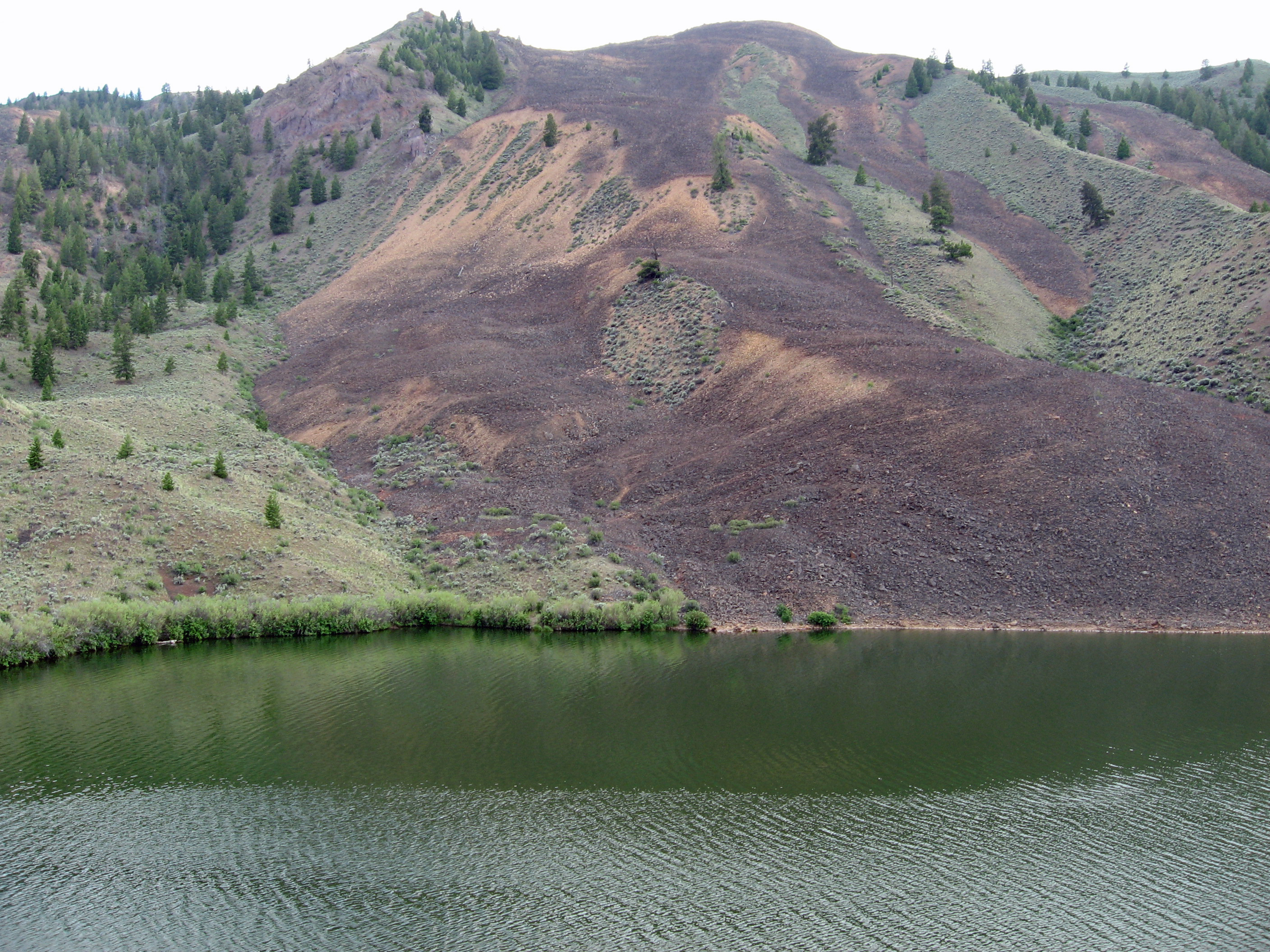
Jimmy Smith Lake landslide

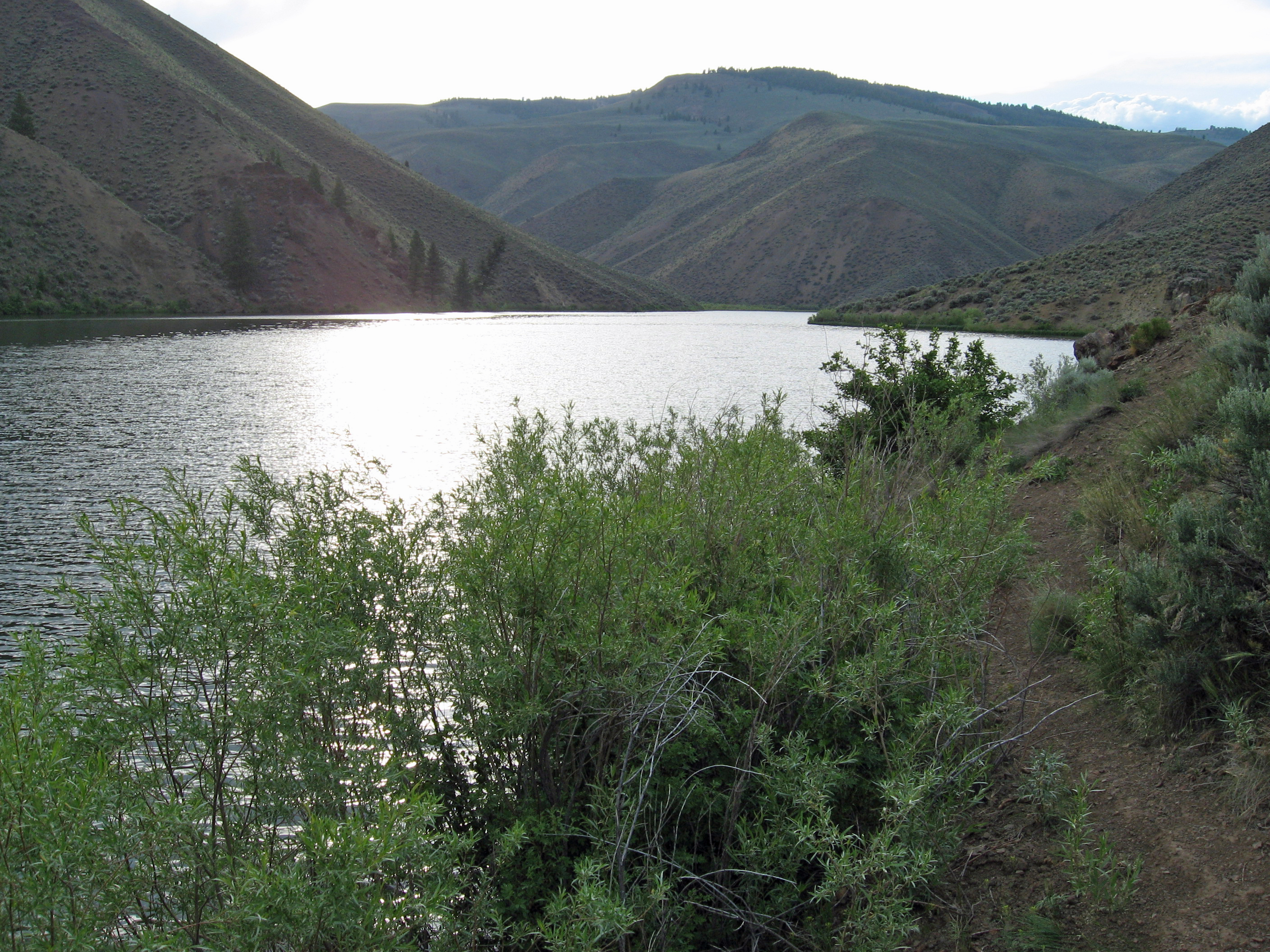
Jimmy Smith Lake

== See also ==
- List of lakes of the White Cloud Mountains
- Sawtooth National Recreation Area
- White Cloud Mountains
- List of lakes in Idaho
