= Goat Lake (White Cloud Mountains) =

Lake in Idaho, United States

- Location within Idaho Location within the United States
- Location: Custer County, Idaho
- Coordinates: 44.098741°N 114.581212°W
- Lake type: Glacial
- Primary outflows: Big Boulder Creek to East Fork Salmon River
- Basin countries: United States
- Max. length: 275 m (902 ft)
- Max. width: 240 m (790 ft)
- Surface elevation: 2,730 m (8,960 ft)

Goat Lake is an alpine lake in Custer County, Idaho, United States, located in the White Cloud Mountains in the Sawtooth National Recreation Area. No trails lead to the lake, but it is most easily accessed from Sawtooth National Forest trail 080.

Goat Lake is southeast of D. O. Lee Peak and northeast, although in a separate basin than, Island Lake.

== See also ==
- List of lakes of the White Cloud Mountains
- Sawtooth National Recreation Area
- White Cloud Mountains
