= Little Redfish Lake (White Cloud Mountains) =

Lake in Idaho, United States

- Location within Idaho Location within the United States
- Location: Custer County, Idaho
- Coordinates: 44°06′14″N 114°32′10″W
- Type: Glacial
- Primary outflows: Big Boulder Creek to East Fork Salmon River
- Basin countries: United States
- Max. length: 0.08 mi (0.13 km)
- Max. width: 0.07 mi (0.11 km)
- Surface elevation: 8,790 ft (2,680 m)

Little Redfish Lake in central Idaho is in the Sawtooth National Recreation Area and Custer County. Little Redfish Lake is in the Big Boulder Creek Watershed of the White Cloud Mountains (another Little Redfish Lake is south of Stanley and downstream of Redfish Lake).

Sawtooth National Forest trail 213 leads to Little Redfish Lake from trail 047 along Big Boulder Creek.

== See also ==
- List of lakes of the White Cloud Mountains
- Sawtooth National Forest
- Sawtooth National Recreation Area
- White Cloud Mountains
