= Cove Lake =

Alpine lake in the state of Idaho

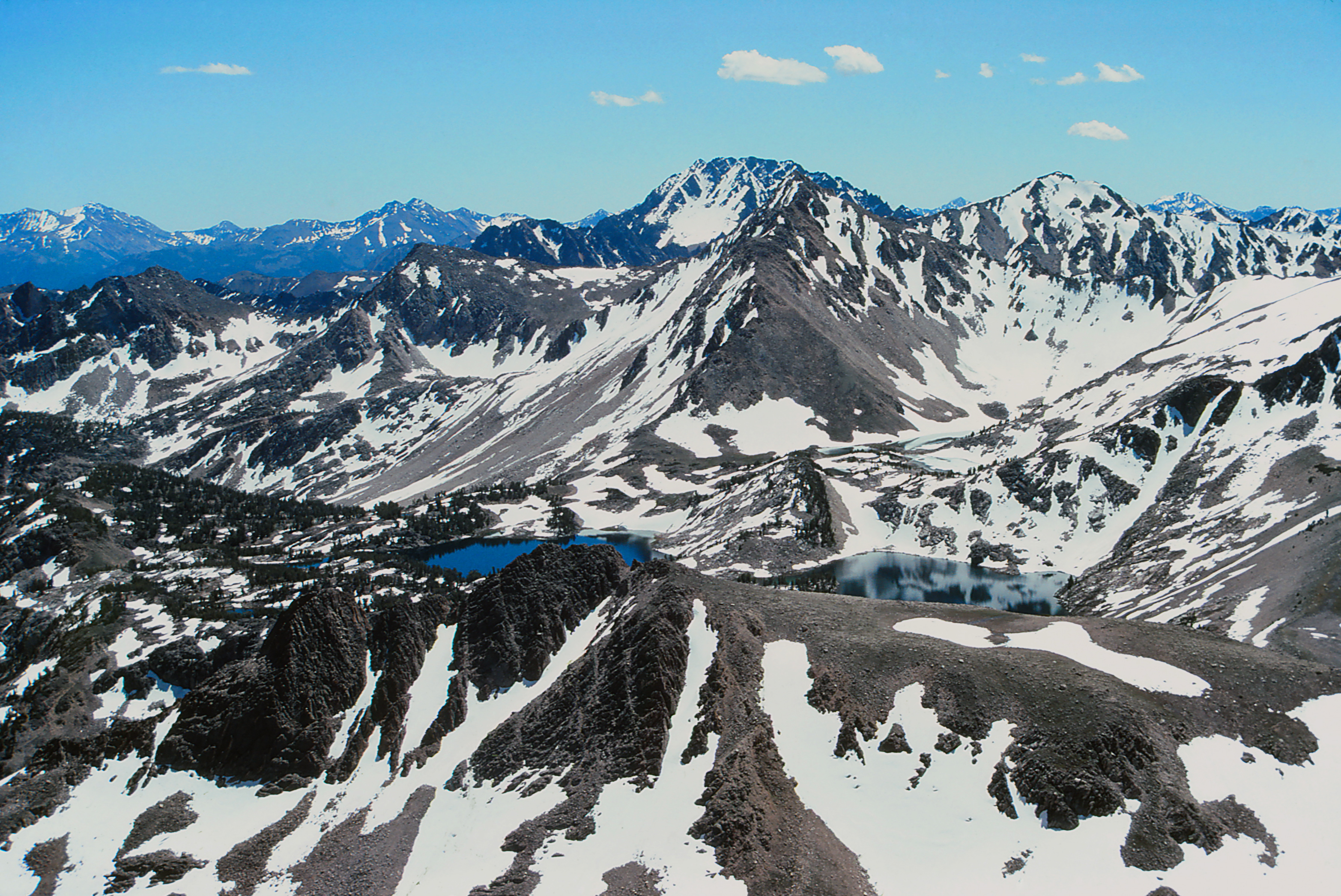
- Cove Lake (left) and Sapphire Lake (right) from Calkens Peak

- Location within Idaho Location within the United States
- Location: Custer County, Idaho
- Coordinates: 44°06′05″N 114°36′31″W
- Lake type: Glacial
- Primary outflows: Big Boulder Creek to East Fork Salmon River
- Basin countries: United States
- Max. length: 490 m (1,610 ft)
- Max. width: 315 m (1,033 ft)
- Surface elevation: 3,005 m (9,859 ft)

Cove Lake is an alpine lake in Custer County, Idaho, United States, located in the White Cloud Mountains in the Sawtooth National Recreation Area. The lake is accessed from Sawtooth National Forest trail 601.

Cove Lake is east of D. O. Lee Peak and next to Hook Lake. It is also upstream of Walker Lake and downstream of Snow, Boulder, Gentian, Sapphire, and Cirque Lakes as well as The Kettles.

== See also ==
- List of lakes of the White Cloud Mountains
- Sawtooth National Recreation Area
- White Cloud Mountains
