= Rock Lake (White Cloud Mountains) =

Alpine lake in the state of Idaho

- Location within Idaho Location within the United States
- Location: Custer County, Idaho
- Coordinates: 44°03′00″N 114°36′32″W
- Type: Glacial
- Part of: Four Lakes
- Primary outflows: Little Boulder Creek to East Fork Salmon River
- Basin countries: United States
- Max. length: 120 m (390 ft)
- Max. width: 69 m (226 ft)
- Surface elevation: 3,025 m (9,925 ft)

Rock Lake is an alpine lake in Custer County, Idaho, United States, located in the White Cloud Mountains in the Sawtooth National Recreation Area. While no trails lead to the lake, it can be accessed from Sawtooth National Forest trail 047.

Rock Lake is northeast of Merriam Peak and upstream of Baker Lake, Cornice, Emerald, Quiet, and Noisy lakes.

== See also ==
- List of lakes of the White Cloud Mountains
- Sawtooth National Recreation Area
- White Cloud Mountains
