= Cirque Lake =

Alpine lake in the state of Idaho

- Location within Idaho Location within the United States
- Location: Custer County, Idaho
- Coordinates: 44°06′25″N 114°37′15″W
- Lake type: Glacial
- Primary outflows: Big Boulder Creek to East Fork Salmon River
- Basin countries: United States
- Max. length: 350 m (1,150 ft)
- Max. width: 315 m (1,033 ft)
- Surface elevation: 3,070 m (10,070 ft)

Cirque Lake is an alpine lake in Custer County, Idaho, United States, located in the White Cloud Mountains in the Sawtooth National Recreation Area. The lake is accessed from Sawtooth National Forest trail 601.

Cirque Lake is just east of D. O. Lee Peak, downstream of The Kettles, and upstream of several other lakes including Cove, Sapphire, and Walker Lakes.

== See also ==
- List of lakes of the White Cloud Mountains
- Sawtooth National Recreation Area
- White Cloud Mountains
