= Independents Day =

Independents Day may refer to:

- Independents Day (album), an album by Twiztid
- Independent's Day, album by Royce da 5'9"
- Independents' Day, a 2016 science fiction film
- Independents Day, a celebration of music independent record labels, a 2008 initiative of the Worldwide Independent Network (see Independent record label#Worldwide Independent Network (WIN))
- Independents Day: Awakening The American Spirit, a book by Lou Dobbs

== See also ==
- Independent Days (disambiguation)
- Independence Day (disambiguation)
