= Sheep Lake =

Lake in Idaho, United States

- Location within Idaho Location within the United States
- Location: Custer County, Idaho
- Coordinates: 44°06′49″N 114°36′35″W
- Type: Glacial
- Primary outflows: Bighorn Creek to Big Boulder Creek to East Fork Salmon River
- Basin countries: United States
- Max. length: 290 m (950 ft)
- Max. width: 200 m (660 ft)
- Surface elevation: 3,015 m (9,892 ft)

Sheep Lake is an alpine lake in Custer County, Idaho, United States, located in the White Cloud Mountains in the Sawtooth National Recreation Area. The lake can be accessed from Sawtooth National Forest trail 601.

Sheep Lake is just south of Calkins Peak, northeast of D. O. Lee Peak, and downstream of Slide and Neck Lakes.

== See also ==
- List of lakes of the White Cloud Mountains
- Sawtooth National Recreation Area
- White Cloud Mountains
