= Sapphire Lake (Idaho) =

Alpine lake in the state of Idaho

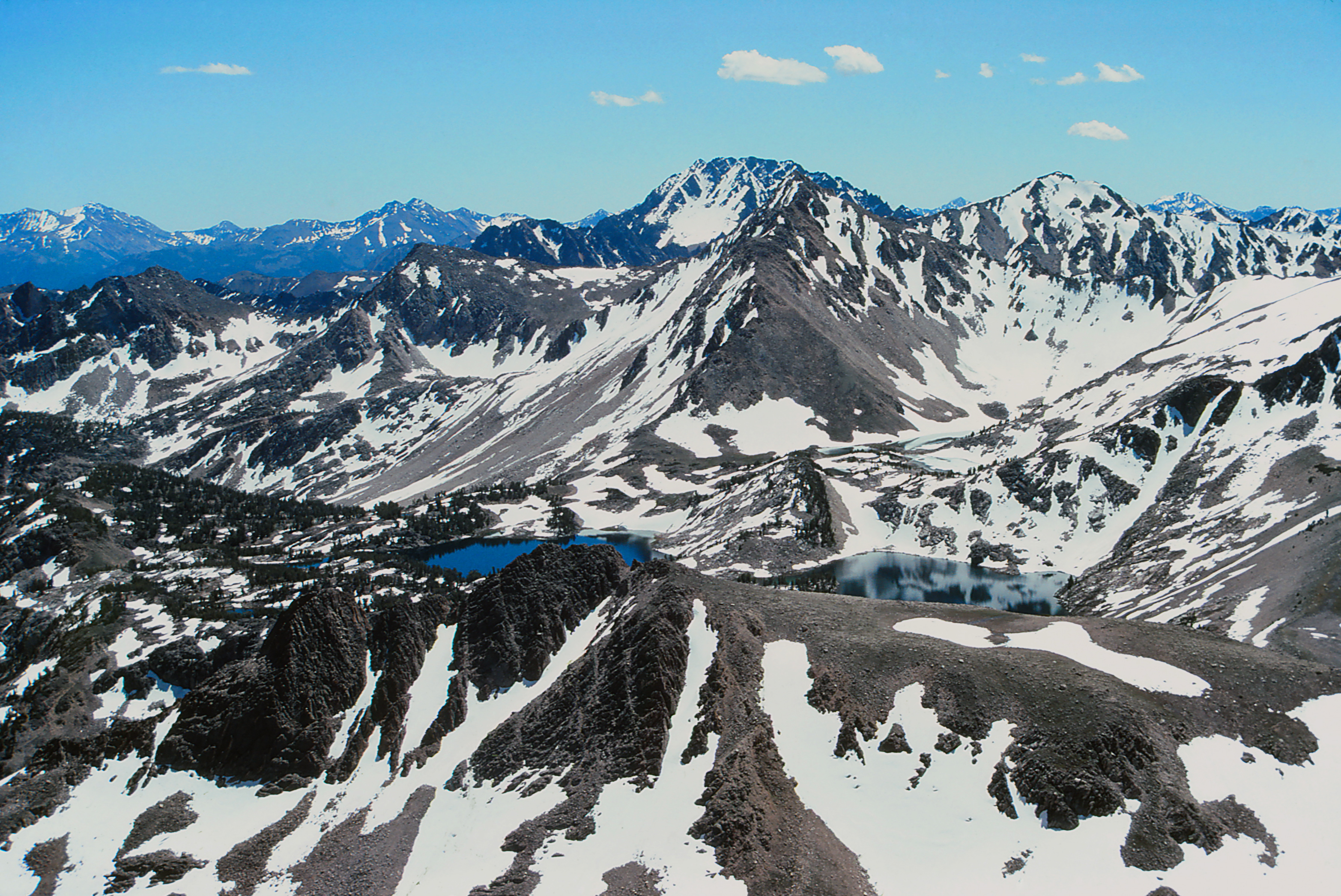
- Sapphire Lake (right) and Cove Lake (left) from Calkens Peak

- Location within Idaho Location within the United States
- Location: Custer County, Idaho
- Coordinates: 44°06′11″N 114°36′54″W
- Type: Glacial
- Primary outflows: Big Boulder Creek to East Fork Salmon River
- Basin countries: United States
- Max. length: 500 m (1,600 ft)
- Max. width: 300 m (980 ft)
- Surface elevation: 3,020 m (9,910 ft)

Sapphire Lake is an alpine lake in Custer County, Idaho, United States, located in the White Cloud Mountains in the Sawtooth National Recreation Area. No trails lead to the lake, but it can be most easily accessed from Sawtooth National Forest trail 601.

Sapphire Lake is east of D. O. Lee Peak in the Big Boulder Lakes Basin along with Cove, Hook, and Cirque Lakes.

== See also ==
- List of lakes of the White Cloud Mountains
- Sawtooth National Recreation Area
- White Cloud Mountains
