= Boulder Lake (Idaho) =

Lake in Idaho, USA

- Location within Idaho Location within the United States
- Location: Custer County, Idaho
- Coordinates: 44°05′53″N 114°36′51″W
- Lake type: Glacial
- Primary outflows: Big Boulder Creek to East Fork Salmon River
- Basin countries: United States
- Max. length: 200 m (660 ft)
- Max. width: 85 m (279 ft)
- Surface elevation: 3,065 m (10,056 ft)

Boulder Lake is an alpine lake in Custer County, Idaho, United States, located in the White Cloud Mountains in the Sawtooth National Recreation Area. The lake is in the Big Boulder Lakes Basin, and is accessed from Sawtooth National Forest trails 601 and 680.

Boulder Lake is just east of D. O. Lee Peak and near several other lakes including Cove, Gentian, Snow Lakes.

== See also ==
- List of lakes of the White Cloud Mountains
- Sawtooth National Recreation Area
- White Cloud Mountains
