= Neck Lake =

Glacial lake in Idaho, USA

- Location within Idaho Location within the United States
- Location: Custer County, Idaho
- Coordinates: 44°06′48″N 114°37′00″W
- Type: Glacial
- Primary outflows: Bighorn Creek to Big Boulder Creek to East Fork Salmon River
- Basin countries: United States
- Max. length: 75 m (246 ft)
- Max. width: 35 m (115 ft)
- Surface elevation: 3,060 m (10,040 ft)

Neck Lake is an alpine lake in Custer County, Idaho, United States, located in the White Cloud Mountains in the Sawtooth National Recreation Area. The lake can be accessed from Sawtooth National Forest trail 601.

Neck Lake is just south of Calkins Peak, northeast of D. O. Lee Peak, upstream of Sheep Lake, and downstream of Slide Lake.

== See also ==
- List of lakes of the White Cloud Mountains
- Sawtooth National Recreation Area
- White Cloud Mountains
