= Sullivan Lake (Idaho) =

Lake in Custer County, Idaho, United States

- Location in Idaho
- Location: Custer County, Idaho
- Coordinates: 44°13′19″N 114°26′38″W
- Type: Landslide dam
- Part of: Columbia River drainage basin
- Primary outflows: Sullivan Creek to Salmon River
- Basin countries: United States
- Max. length: 450 m (1,480 ft)
- Max. width: 315 m (1,033 ft)
- Surface elevation: 2,055 m (6,742 ft)

Sullivan Lake is a landslide-dammed mountain lake in Custer County, Idaho, United States, located at the northern end of the White Cloud Mountains in the Sawtooth National Recreation Area. The lake is accessed from Sawtooth National Forest trail 677 from Idaho State Highway 75.

Sullivan Lake is just east of Potaman Peak and upstream of Sullivan Hot Springs.

== See also ==
- List of lakes of the White Cloud Mountains
- Sawtooth National Recreation Area
- White Cloud Mountains
