= Slide Lake (White Cloud Mountains) =

Lake in the White Cloud Mountains in Idaho, United States

- Location within Idaho Location within the United States
- Location: Custer County, Idaho
- Coordinates: 44°06′44″N 114°37′11″W
- Type: Glacial
- Primary outflows: Bighorn Creek to Big Boulder Creek to East Fork Salmon River
- Basin countries: United States
- Max. length: 240 m (790 ft)
- Max. width: 95 m (312 ft)
- Surface elevation: 3,110 m (10,200 ft)

Slide Lake is an alpine lake in Custer County, Idaho, United States, located in the White Cloud Mountains in the Sawtooth National Recreation Area. The lake can be accessed from Sawtooth National Forest trail 601.

Slide Lake is just south of Calkins Peak, northeast of D. O. Lee Peak, and upstream of Sheep and Neck Lakes.

== See also ==
- List of lakes of the White Cloud Mountains
- Sawtooth National Recreation Area
- White Cloud Mountains
