= Patterson Peak (Custer County, Idaho) =

Mountain in United States of America

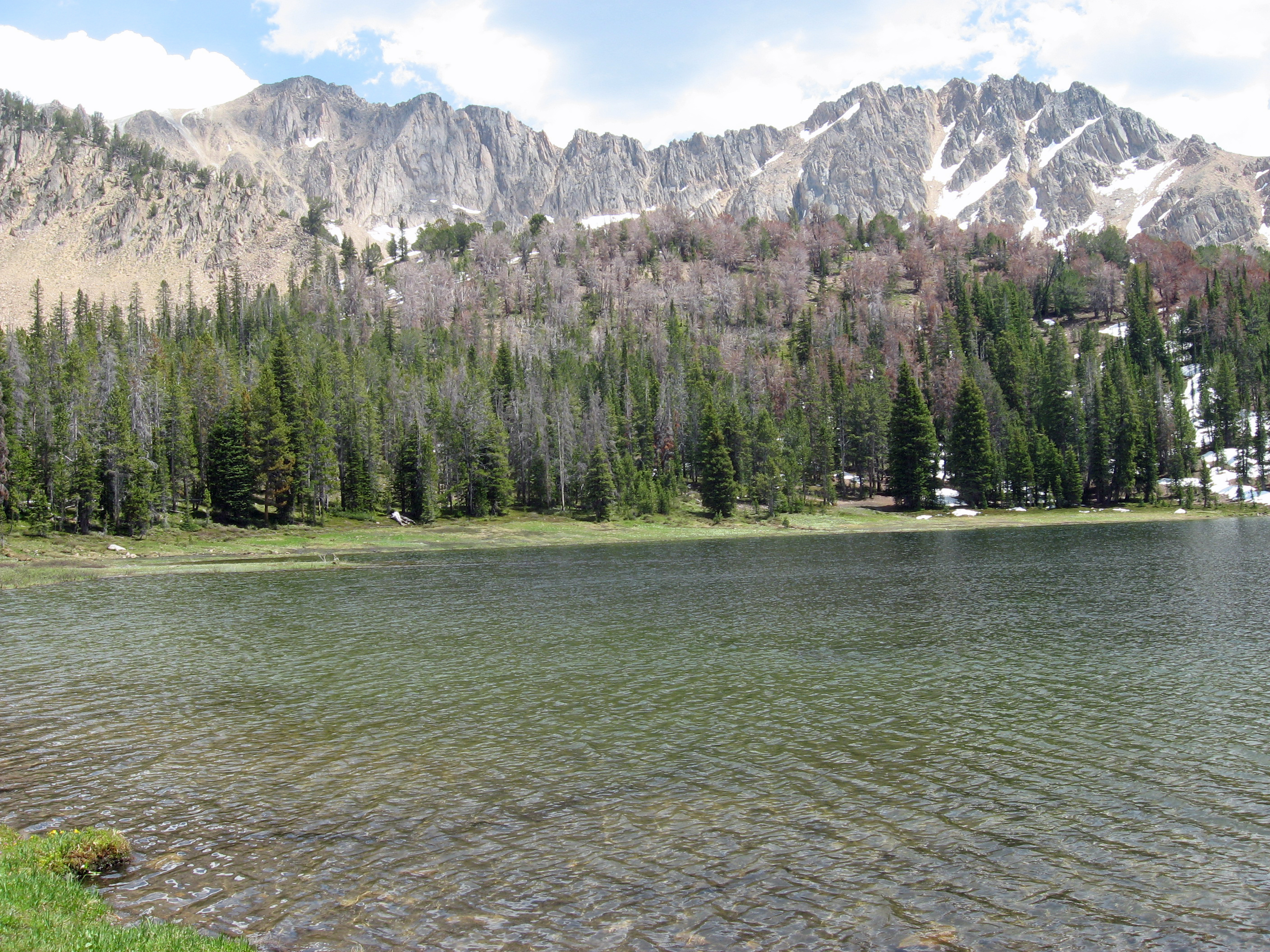
- Patterson Peak at left and Fourth of July Lake

Highest point
- Elevation: 10,872 ft (3,314 m)
- Prominence: 252 ft (77 m)
- Parent peak: Castle Peak
- Coordinates: 44°02′56″N 114°37′07″W

Geography
- Location within Idaho
- Location: Custer County, Idaho, U.S.
- Parent range: White Cloud Mountains
- Topo map: USGS Boulder Chain Lakes

Climbing
- Easiest route: Simple scrambling, class 2

Patterson Peak at 10,872 feet (3,314 m) above sea level is a peak in the White Cloud Mountains of Idaho. The peak is located in Sawtooth National Recreation Area in Custer County 2.70 mi (4.35 km) west of Castle Peak, its line parent. Patterson Peak is about 1.5 mi (2.4 km) northeast of Fourth of July Peak, and it rises to the east of Fourth of July Lake. Glacier, Rock, Emerald, and Cornice lakes are in the basin to the northeast of the peak.
