= Emerald Lake (Idaho) =

Alpine lake in the state of Idaho

- Location within Idaho Location within the United States
- Location: Custer County, Idaho
- Coordinates: 44°03′05″N 114°36′35″W
- Lake type: Glacial
- Part of: Four Lakes
- Primary outflows: Little Boulder Creek to East Fork Salmon River
- Basin countries: United States
- Max. length: 214 m (702 ft)
- Max. width: 140 m (460 ft)
- Surface elevation: 3,020 m (9,910 ft)

Emerald Lake is an alpine lake in Custer County, Idaho, United States, located in the White Cloud Mountains in the Sawtooth National Recreation Area. While no trails lead to the lake, it can be accessed from Sawtooth National Forest trail 047.

Emerald Lake is northeast of Merriam Peak, upstream of Baker and Cornice Lakes, and downstream of Glacier and Rock Lakes.

== See also ==
- List of lakes of the White Cloud Mountains
- Sawtooth National Recreation Area
- White Cloud Mountains
