= Independent Days =

Independent Days may refer to:

- Independent Days (album), a 2001 album by Backyard Babies
- Independent Days Festival, an Italian music festival
- Independent Days International Filmfest, a German film festival

== See also ==
- Independents Day (disambiguation)
