= Independence Day (disambiguation) =

An independence day is an annual event commemorating the anniversary of a nation's independence or statehood.

Independence Day may also refer to:

== Films and related media ==
- Independence Day (1983 film), a film starring Kathleen Quinlan
- Independence Day (franchise), a franchise of two science-fiction action films and other media
  - Independence Day (1996 film), the first film in the series, directed by Roland Emmerich
  - Independence Day (video game), a 1997 game based on the film
  - Independence Day (book series), a book series based on the film and its setting
  - Independence Day: Resurgence, a 2016 sequel to the 1996 film
- Independence Day (2000 film), a multilingual Indian film by A. R. Ramesh

== Literature ==
- Independence Day (Darvill-Evans novel), a 2000 Doctor Who novel by Peter Darvill-Evans
- Independence Day (Ford novel), a 1995 novel by Richard Ford
- Independence Day, a 2015 novel by Ben Coes
- Independence Day or Iseseisvuspäev, a 1998 novel by Kaur Kender
- Independence Day (adventure), a 1996 short story and RPG supplement for Deadlands

== Music ==
=== Songs ===
- "Independence Day" (Bruce Springsteen song) (1980)
- "Independence Day" (Martina McBride song) (1994)
- "Independence Day", a song by 5 Seconds of Summer from 5 Seconds of Summer
- "Independence Day", a song by Brave Saint Saturn from So Far from Home
- "Independence Day", a song by Cascada from Original Me
- "Independence Day", a song by the Comsat Angels from Waiting for a Miracle
- "Independence Day", a song by David Byrne from Rei Momo
- "Independence Day", a song by Elliott Smith from XO
- "Independence Day", a song by White Heart from Power House

=== Albums ===
- Independence Day, a 1990 EP by The Bruisers
- Independence Day, a 2010 album by King Chip
- Independence Day, a 2004 album by Luni Coleone
- Independence Day, Volume 1 and Volume 2, 2009-10 mixtapes by D. Woods
- Independence Day, a 2021 album by Fredo

== Television ==
- "Independence Day" (The Cosby Show)
- "Independence Day" (The Dead Zone)
- "Independence Day" (Roswell)
- "Independence Day" (Step by Step)
- "Independence Day" (The Wonder Years)
- "Independence Day" (Young Justice)

== See also ==
- Day of Independence, a 2003 short film aired as a PBS television special
- List of national independence days
- Independent Days (disambiguation)
- Independents Day (disambiguation)
