= Noisy Lake =

Alpine lake in the state of Idaho

- Location within Idaho Location within the United States
- Location: Custer County, Idaho
- Coordinates: 44°03′28″N 114°35′01″W
- Type: Glacial
- Primary outflows: Little Boulder Creek to East Fork Salmon River
- Basin countries: United States
- Max. length: 420 m (1,380 ft)
- Max. width: 185 m (607 ft)
- Surface elevation: 2,745 m (9,006 ft)

Noisy Lake is an alpine lake in Custer County, Idaho, United States, located in the White Cloud Mountains in the Sawtooth National Recreation Area. While no trails lead to the lake, it can be accessed from Sawtooth National Forest trail 047.

Noisy Lake is northeast of Merriam Peak, upstream of Baker Lake, and downstream of several other lakes including Cornice, Emerald, Glacier, and Rock Lakes.

== See also ==
- List of lakes of the White Cloud Mountains
- Sawtooth National Recreation Area
- White Cloud Mountains
