= Gentian Lake =

Alpine lake in the state of Idaho

- Location within Idaho Location within the United States
- Location: Custer County, Idaho
- Coordinates: 44.097145°N 114.612036°W
- Lake type: Glacial
- Primary outflows: Big Boulder Creek to East Fork Salmon River
- Basin countries: United States
- Max. length: 100 m (330 ft)
- Max. width: 80 m (260 ft)
- Surface elevation: 3,060 m (10,040 ft)

Gentian Lake is an alpine lake in Custer County, Idaho, United States, located in the White Cloud Mountains in the Sawtooth National Recreation Area. Although no trails lead to the lake, it can be accessed from Sawtooth National Forest trail 601.

Gentian Lake is southeast of D. O. Lee Peak, upstream of Cove Lake, and in the same basin as Boulder and Snow Lakes.

== See also ==
- List of lakes of the White Cloud Mountains
- Sawtooth National Recreation Area
- White Cloud Mountains
