= Snow Lake (Idaho) =

Alpine lake in the state of Idaho

- Location within Idaho Location within the United States
- Location: Custer County, Idaho
- Coordinates: 44°05′45″N 114°36′50″W
- Type: Glacial
- Primary outflows: Big Boulder Creek to East Fork Salmon River
- Basin countries: United States
- Max. length: 310 m (1,020 ft)
- Max. width: 115 m (377 ft)
- Surface elevation: 3,055 m (10,023 ft)

Snow Lake is an alpine lake in Custer County, Idaho, United States, located in the White Cloud Mountains in the Sawtooth National Recreation Area. The lake can be accessed via Sawtooth National Forest trail 601.

Snow Lake is southeast of D. O. Lee Peak, upstream of Cove Lake, and in the same basin as Gentian and Boulder Lakes.

== See also ==
- List of lakes of the White Cloud Mountains
- Sawtooth National Recreation Area
- White Cloud Mountains
