= Six Lakes =

- Interactive map of Six Lakes
- Location: Custer County, Idaho, United States
- Type: Glacial and alpine Paternoster lakes
- Primary inflows: Fourth of July Creek
- Primary outflows: Fourth of July Lake
- Basin countries: United States

The Six Lakes are a chain of six alpine and glacial Paternoster lakes in Custer County, Idaho, United States, located in the White Cloud Mountains in the Sawtooth National Recreation Area. The lakes are located on the upper portion of the Fourth of July Creek watershed, a tributary of the Salmon River and the outflow of Fourth of July Lake. The Six Lakes are above Heart Lake. The lakes have not been individually named, and the three uppermost lakes are at nearly the same elevation and may form one lake when water levels are high. While no trails lead to the lakes, they are most easily accessed from Sawtooth National Forest road 205 along Fourth of July Creek. The lakes do not have official names and are listed from lowest to highest elevation.

Six Lakes
Lake	Elevation	Max. length	Max. width	Location
Six Lake 1	2,757 m (9,045 ft)	075 m (246 ft)	40 m (130 ft)	44.024344°N 114.676620°W
Six Lake 2	2,793 m (9,163 ft)	051 m (167 ft)	32 m (105 ft)	44.022885°N 114.673923°W
Six Lake 3	2,800 m (9,200 ft)	225 m (738 ft)	95 m (312 ft)	44.024541°N 114.672305°W
Six Lake 4	2,815 m (9,236 ft)	183 m (600 ft)	70 m (230 ft)	44.020407°N 114.672064°W
Six Lake 5	2,815 m (9,236 ft)	097 m (318 ft)	50 m (160 ft)	44.020684°N 114.670465°W
Six Lake 6	2,815 m (9,236 ft)	155 m (509 ft)	60 m (200 ft)	44.019045°N 114.670028°W

== See also ==
- List of lakes of the White Cloud Mountains
- Sawtooth National Forest
- Sawtooth National Recreation Area
- White Cloud Mountains
