= Fourth of July Creek =

Fourth of July Creek is the name of many streams in North America, including:

- Fourth of July Creek (Kenai Peninsula, Alaska)
- Fourth of July Creek (Salmon River tributary), in Custer County, Idaho
  - Fourth of July Lake, headwaters of the creek
- Fourth of July Creek (Beckler River tributary), in Snohomish County, Washington
- Fourth of July Creek (Icicle Creek tributary), in Chelan County, Washington
- Fourth of July Creek, part of the headwaters of the Winchuck River in Oregon
- Fourth of July Creek, a minor tributary of the Yukon River in Alaska
- Fourth of July Creek, a minor tributary of the Yentna River in Alaska
- Fourth of July Creek, a possible location of Jolly Jack's Lost Mine in British Columbia

Fourth of July Creek may also refer to:

- Fourth of July Creek (novel), a 2014 novel that was a finalist for the Center for Fiction First Novel Prize

== See also ==
- Fourth of July (disambiguation)
