= Champion Lakes Provincial Park =

Canadian provincial park

- IUCN category II (national park)
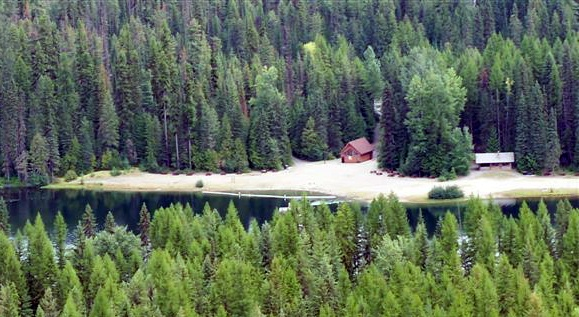
- 3rd Champion Lake and beach from lookout trail

- Location within British Columbia
- Interactive map of Champion Lakes Provincial Park
- Location: Kootenay Land District, British Columbia, Canada
- Nearest city: Trail, BC
- Coordinates: 49°11′04″N 117°37′25″W
- Area: 1,452 ha (3,590 acres)
- Established: March 12, 1955
- Governing body: BC Parks

Champion Lakes Provincial Park is a provincial park in the West Kootenay region of British Columbia, Canada, northeast of the city of Trail in the province's West Kootenay region.

The park was established by order-in-council in 1955. Its boundaries were adjusted in 2000 to approximately 1,245 hectares and again in 2004 to approximately 1,452 hectares.

== Location ==
It is located 8 km (5.0 mi) east of Fruitvale via Highway 3B, then 10 km (6.2 mi) north on a paved side road.

== Facilities ==
Camping, swimming and hiking trails are available in summer. In winter, there is an extensive network of Nordic ski trails, groomed and tracked by volunteers from the Beaver Valley Cross-Country Ski Club.
