= Fourth of July Lake =

Alpine lake in Custer County, Idaho

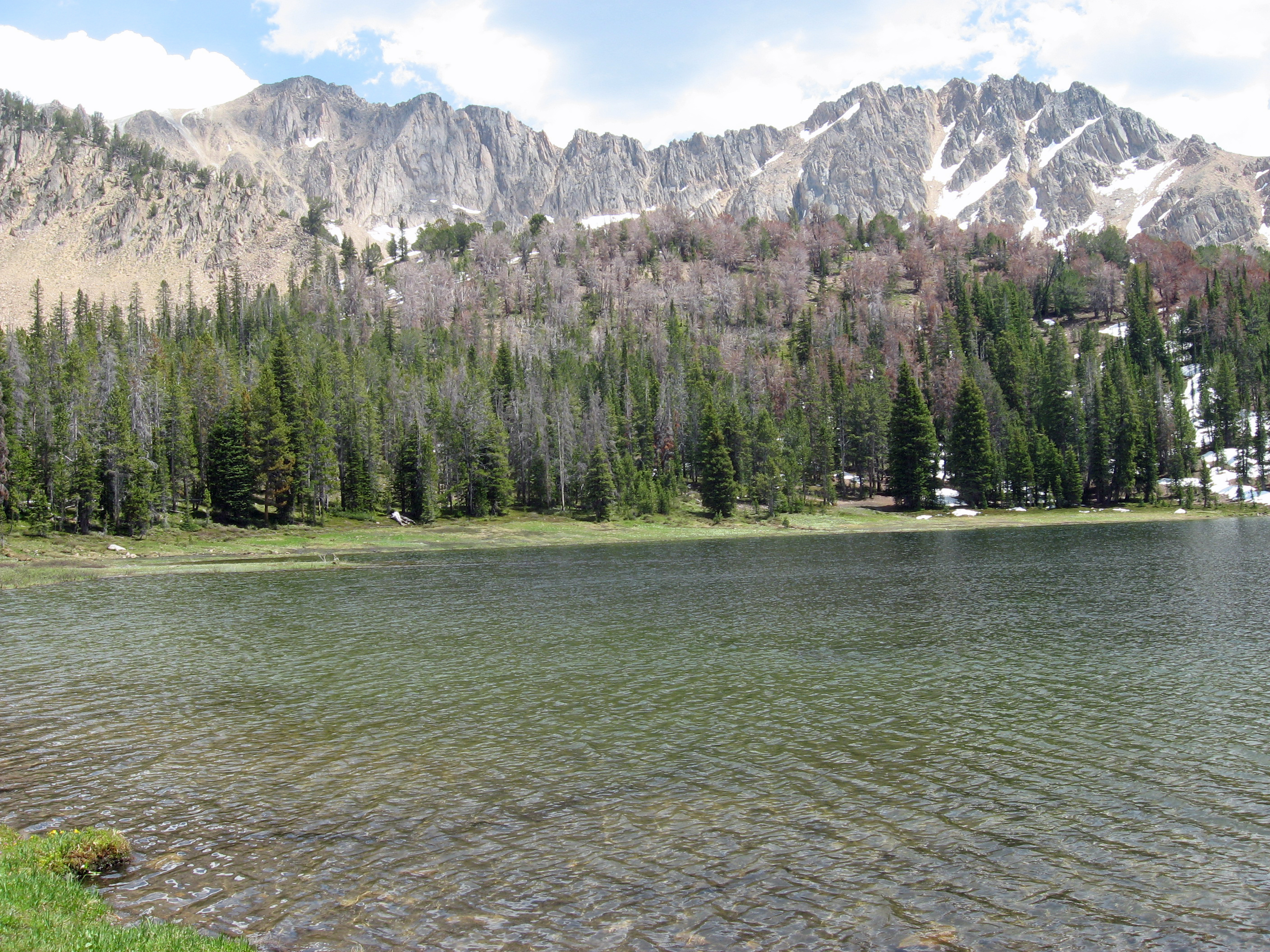
- Fourth of July Lake

- Location within Idaho Location within the United States
- Location: Custer County, Idaho
- Coordinates: 44°02′36″N 114°37′52″W
- Lake type: Glacial
- Primary outflows: Fourth of July Creek to Salmon River
- Basin countries: United States
- Max. length: 275 m (902 ft)
- Max. width: 183 m (600 ft)
- Surface elevation: 2,860 m (9,380 ft)

Fourth of July Lake is an alpine lake in Custer County, Idaho, United States, located in the White Cloud Mountains in the Sawtooth National Recreation Area. The lake is accessed from Sawtooth National Forest trail 109.

Fourth of July Lake is just west of Patterson Peak, northeast of Fourth of July Peak, and northwest of Washington Lake, although Washington Lake is in a separate basin.

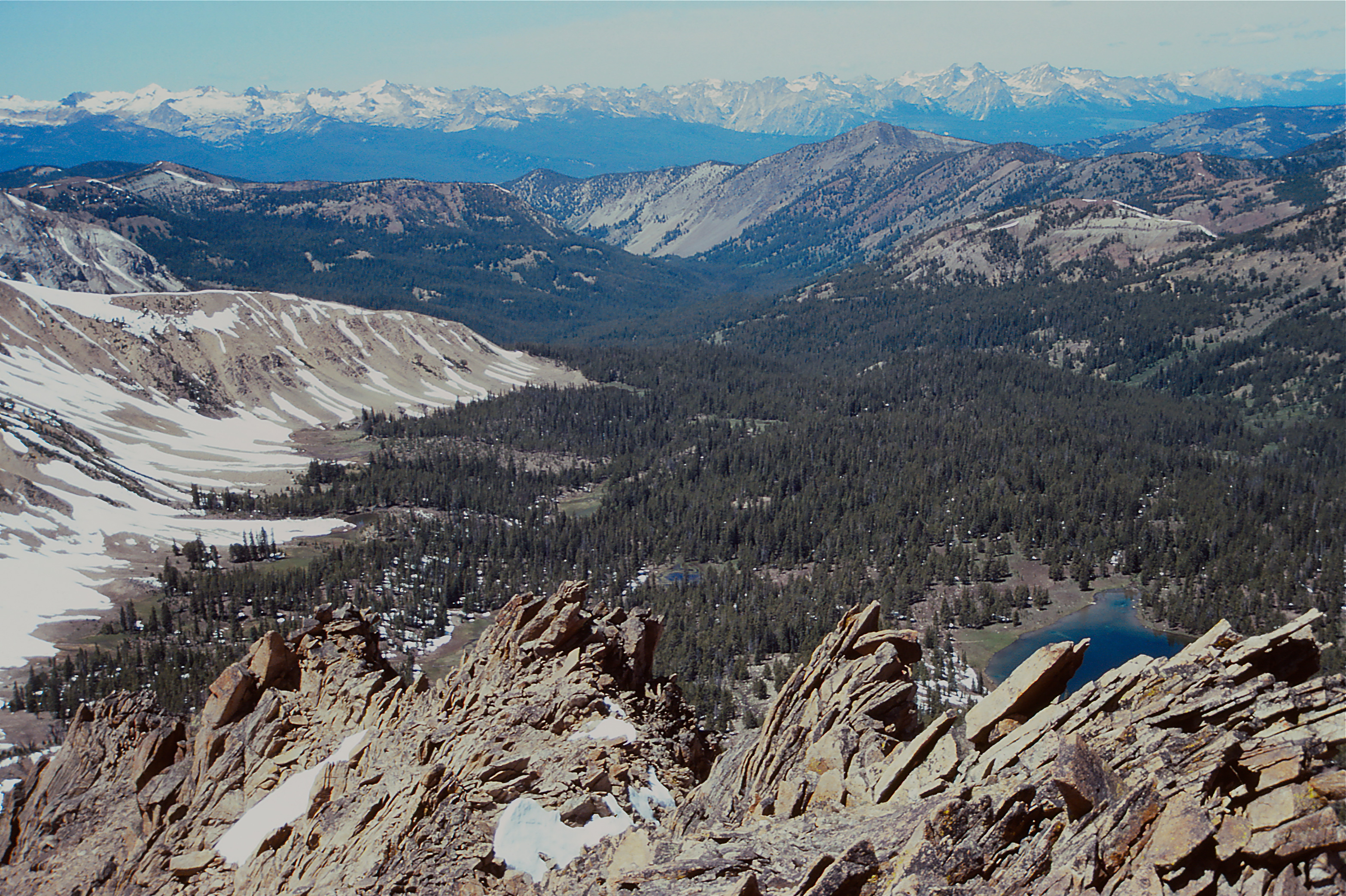
Fourth of July Lake at lower right

== See also ==
- List of lakes of the White Cloud Mountains
- Sawtooth National Recreation Area
- White Cloud Mountains
