= Livingston Creek =

Stream in Virginia, United States

Coordinates: 36°40′34.37″N 82°21′8.52″W

Livingston Creek is a stream in the Washington and Scott counties of Virginia, in the United States. It is a tributary of the North Fork Holston River.

== History ==
Livingston Creek was named for a family of early settlers, William Todd Livingston.

== See also ==
- List of rivers of Virginia
- Mendota, Virginia
