= The Kettles =

Alpine lakes in the state of Idaho

- Interactive map of The Kettles
- Location: Custer County, Idaho, United States
- Type: Glacial lakes
- Basin countries: United States

The Kettles are a chain of four small alpine glacial lakes in Custer County, Idaho, United States, located in the White Cloud Mountains in the Sawtooth National Recreation Area. The lakes are located in the upper portion of the Big Boulder Creek watershed east of D. O. Lee Peak in the uppermost portion of the Big Boulder Lakes Basin. Sawtooth National Forest trail 601 along leads to the Big Boulder Lakes.

== See also ==
- List of lakes of the White Cloud Mountains
- Sawtooth National Forest
- Sawtooth National Recreation Area
- White Cloud Mountains
