= Champion Lakes (Idaho) =

Alpine lakes in Idaho, United States

- Location within Idaho
- Interactive map of Champion Lakes
- Location: Sawtooth National Forest; Custer County, Idaho
- Type: Paternoster lakes
- Primary inflows: Champion Creek
- Basin countries: United States
- Max. length: 249–1,755 feet (76–535 m)
- Max. width: 112–682 feet (34–208 m)
- Surface elevation: 8,602–8,678 feet (2,622–2,645 m)
- Sections/sub-basins: Champion Lake 1; Lake 2; Lake 3; Lake 4; Lake 5; Lake 6; Lake 7
- References: U.S. Geological Survey Geographic Names Information System: Champion Lakes (Idaho)

The Champion Lakes are a chain of seven alpine and glacial Paternoster lakes in Custer County, Idaho, United States, located in the White Cloud Mountains in the Sawtooth National Recreation Area. The lakes are located on the upper portion of the Champion Creek watershed, a tributary of the Salmon River. The lakes have not been individually named, and lakes 5 and 6 are often dry. Sawtooth National Forest trail 105 leads to the lakes. In 2005, the Valley Road Forest Fire burned part of the Champion Lakes Basin.

Champion Lakes
Lake	Elevation	Max. length	Max. width	Location
Champion Lake 1	2,622 m (8,602 ft)	076 m (249 ft)	031 m (102 ft)	44.012554°N 114.691772°W
Champion Lake 2	2,624 m (8,609 ft)	390 m (1,280 ft)	220 m (720 ft)	44.009403°N 114.691421°W
Champion Lake 3	2,633 m (8,638 ft)	180 m (590 ft)	80 m (260 ft)	44.005522°N 114.691487°W
Champion Lake 4	2,645 m (8,678 ft)	535 m (1,755 ft)	208 m (682 ft)	44.000038°N 114.685702°W
Champion Lake 5	2,646 m (8,681 ft)	060 m (200 ft)	034 m (112 ft)	43.996582°N 114.683324°W
Champion Lake 6	2,695 m (8,842 ft)	105 m (344 ft)	072 m (236 ft)	43.992977°N 114.689571°W
Champion Lake 7	2,719 m (8,921 ft)	056 m (184 ft)	038 m (125 ft)	43.994641°N 114.677332°W

== See also ==
- List of lakes of the White Cloud Mountains
- Sawtooth National Forest
- Sawtooth National Recreation Area
- White Cloud Mountains
