= Casino Lakes =

Alpine lakes in Idaho, United States

- Interactive map of Casino Lakes
- Location: Custer County, Idaho, United States
- Coordinates: 44.176110°N 114.817316°W
- Type: Glacial lakes
- Primary inflows: Big Casino Creek
- Basin countries: United States

The Casino Lakes are a chain of four alpine glacial lakes in Custer County, Idaho, United States, located in the White Cloud Mountains in the Sawtooth National Recreation Area. The lakes are located on the upper portion of the Big Casino Creek watershed, a tributary of the Salmon River. The lakes have not been individually named, and Sawtooth National Forest trail 646 leads to the lakes.

Casino Lakes
Lake	Elevation	Max. length	Max. width	Location
Casino Lake 1	2,633 m (8,638 ft)	138 m (453 ft)	103 m (338 ft)	44.176110°N 114.817316°W
Casino Lake 2	2,682 m (8,799 ft)	133 m (436 ft)	131 m (430 ft)	44.173115°N 114.815882°W
Casino Lake 3	2,789 m (9,150 ft)	180 m (590 ft)	102 m (335 ft)	44.171617°N 114.824260°W
Casino Lake 4	2,791 m (9,157 ft)	103 m (338 ft)	33 m (108 ft)	44.168736°N 114.819837°W

== See also ==
- List of lakes of the White Cloud Mountains
- Sawtooth National Forest
- Sawtooth National Recreation Area
- White Cloud Mountains
