= Merriam Peak (Idaho) =

Mountain in the state of Idaho

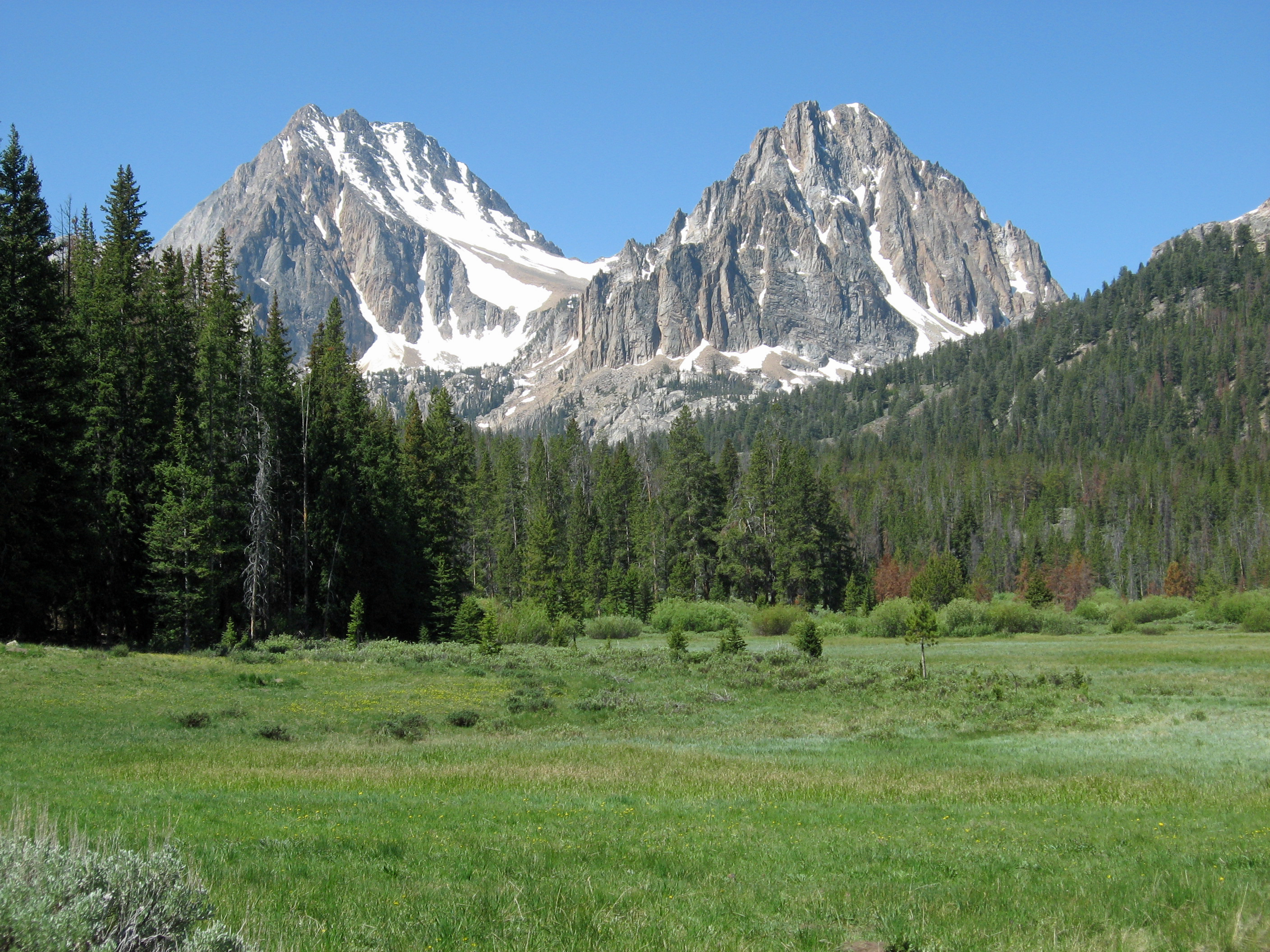
- Merriam Peak (right) and Castle Peak (left)

Highest point
- Elevation: 10,920 ft (3,330 m)
- Prominence: 520 ft (160 m)
- Coordinates: 44°03′08″N 114°34′51″W

Geography
- Location within Idaho
- Location: Custer County, Idaho, U.S.
- Parent range: White Cloud Mountains
- Topo map: USGS Boulder Chain Lakes

Climbing
- Easiest route: Scrambling, class 3

Merriam Peak, at 10,920 feet (3,330 m) is one of the peaks of the White Cloud Mountains of Custer County, Idaho. It was named for John H. Merriam who played an instrumental role in protecting the area from being mined for molybdenum. Merriam Peak is located in the middle of the range just north of Castle Peak, the highest point in the range. The peak is located in the White Clouds roadless area of Sawtooth National Recreation Area.

Merriam Peak is in the watershed of Little Boulder Creek, which is a tributary of the East Fork of the Salmon River. Castle Lake is at the peak's southern base, separating it from Castle Peak. Baker Lake is east of the peak, while Noisy and Quiet lakes are north and west of the peak, respectively.

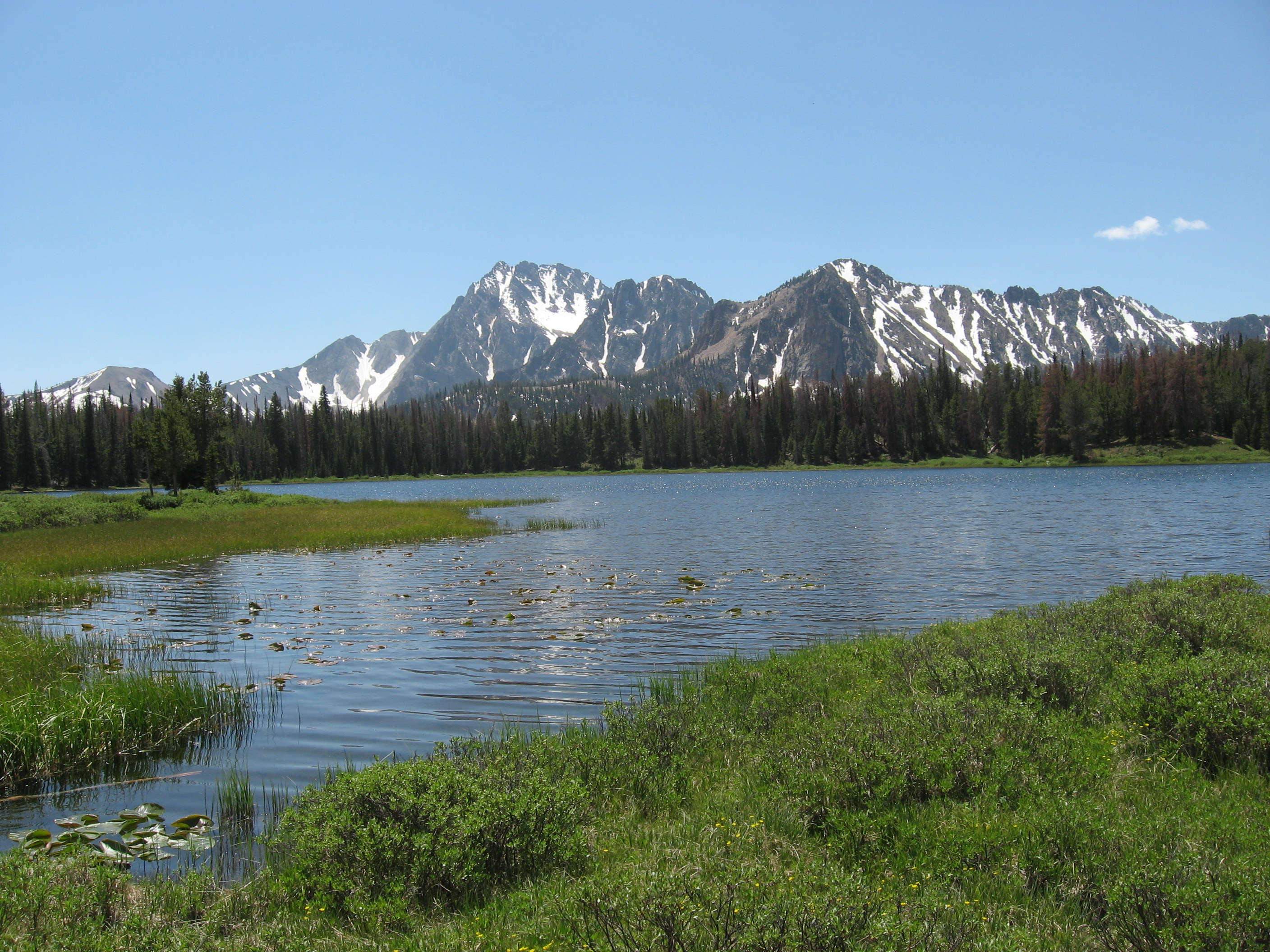
Merriam Peak at center (right of the highest peak) view from Frog Lake
