= Chinese Wall (Idaho) =

Mountain in Custer County, Idaho, United States

- Location within Idaho

Highest point
- Elevation: 11,238 ft (3,425 m)
- Prominence: 198 ft (60 m)
- Parent peak: Calkins Peak
- Coordinates: 44°07′43″N 114°37′09″W

Geography
- Location: Custer County, Idaho, U.S.
- Parent range: White Cloud Mountains
- Topo map: USGS Livingston Creek

Chinese Wall at 11,238 feet (3,425 m) above sea level is a cliff and peak in the White Cloud Mountains of Idaho. The peak is located in Sawtooth National Recreation Area in Custer County 0.53 mi (0.85 km) north of Calkins Peak, its line parent.
