= East Fork Salmon River =

- Location of the mouth of the East Fork Salmon River in Idaho East Fork Salmon River (the United States)

Location
- Country: United States
- State: Idaho
- Region: Custer County

Physical characteristics
- Source: Boulder Mountains
  - coordinates: 43°44′46″N 114°33′17″W
- Mouth: Salmon River
  - coordinates: 44°16′06″N 114°19′36″W
  - elevation: 5,390 ft (1,640 m)
- Length: 34 mi (55 km)
- Basin size: 541 sq mi (1,400 km^{2})

The East Fork Salmon River is a 34-mile (55 km) tributary of the Salmon River, flowing through Custer County, Idaho in the United States. It joins the Salmon River about 3.7 miles (6.0 km) east of Clayton and 17 miles (27 km) south-southwest of Challis. The East Fork Salmon River is formed at the confluence of the West Fork East Fork Salmon River and the South Fork East Fork Salmon River between the Boulder and White Cloud mountains in Sawtooth National Recreation Area.

== See also ==
- List of rivers of Idaho
