= Sliderock Lake =

Alpine lake in the state of Idaho

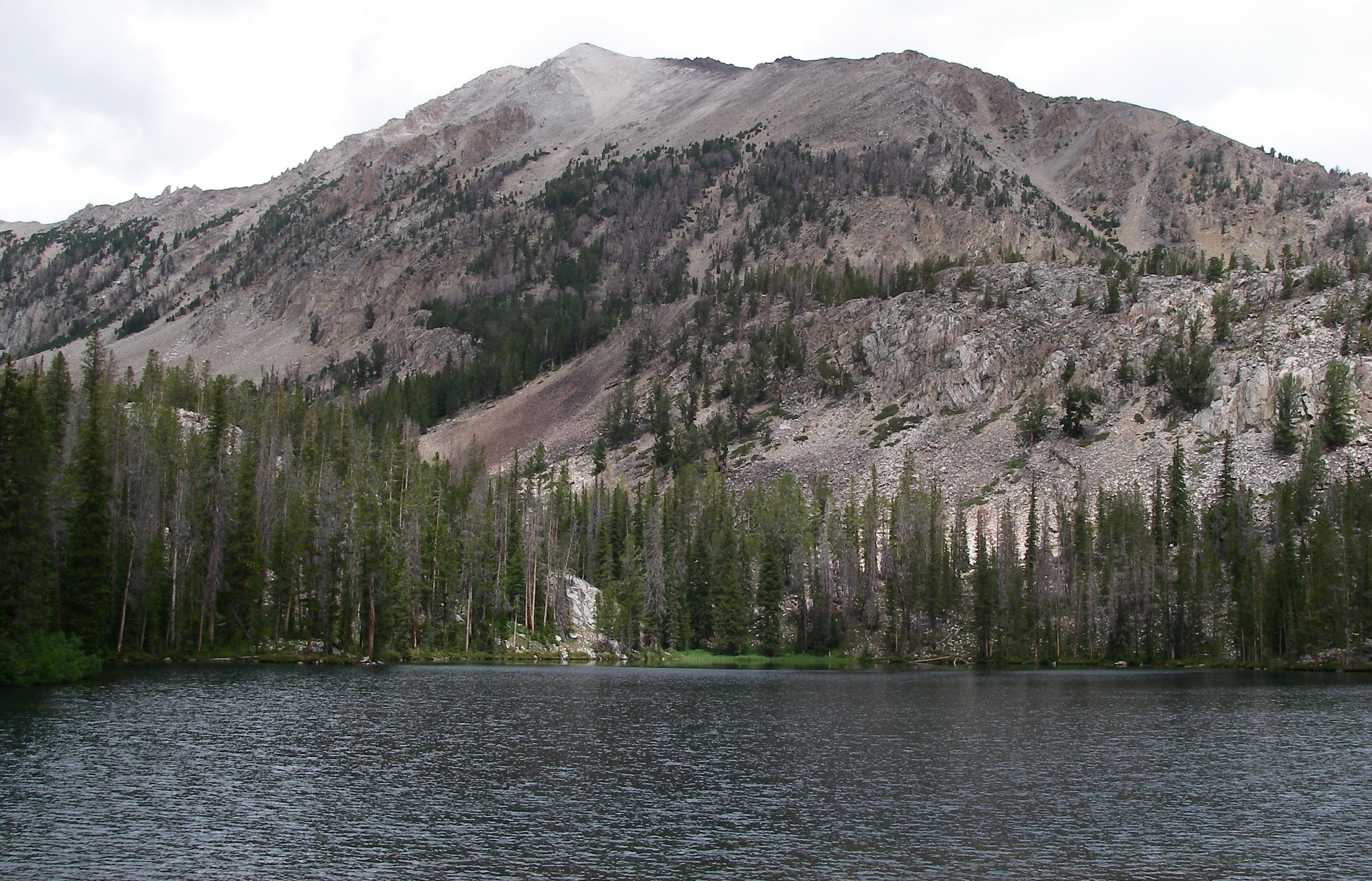

- Location within Idaho Location within the United States
- Location: Custer County, Idaho
- Coordinates: 44°04′14″N 114°34′18″W
- Type: Glacial
- Primary outflows: Little Boulder Creek to East Fork Salmon River
- Basin countries: United States
- Max. length: 1,000 ft (300 m)
- Max. width: 470 ft (140 m)
- Surface area: 8.4 acres (3.4 ha)
- Surface elevation: 8,983 ft (2,738 m)

Sliderock Lake is an alpine lake in Custer County, Idaho, United States, located in the White Cloud Mountains in the Sawtooth National Recreation Area. The lake is named for a jumbled rock slide that extends into the lake from the south side.

Sliderock Lake is northeast of Merriam Peak and located in the lower section of the Boulder Chain Lakes Basin. The lake is accessed from Sawtooth National Forest trail 683.

== See also ==
- Castle Peak
- List of lakes of the White Cloud Mountains
- Hatchet Lake
- Shelf Lake
- Sawtooth National Recreation Area
- White Cloud Mountains
