= Packrat Peak =

Mountain in the state of Idaho, United States

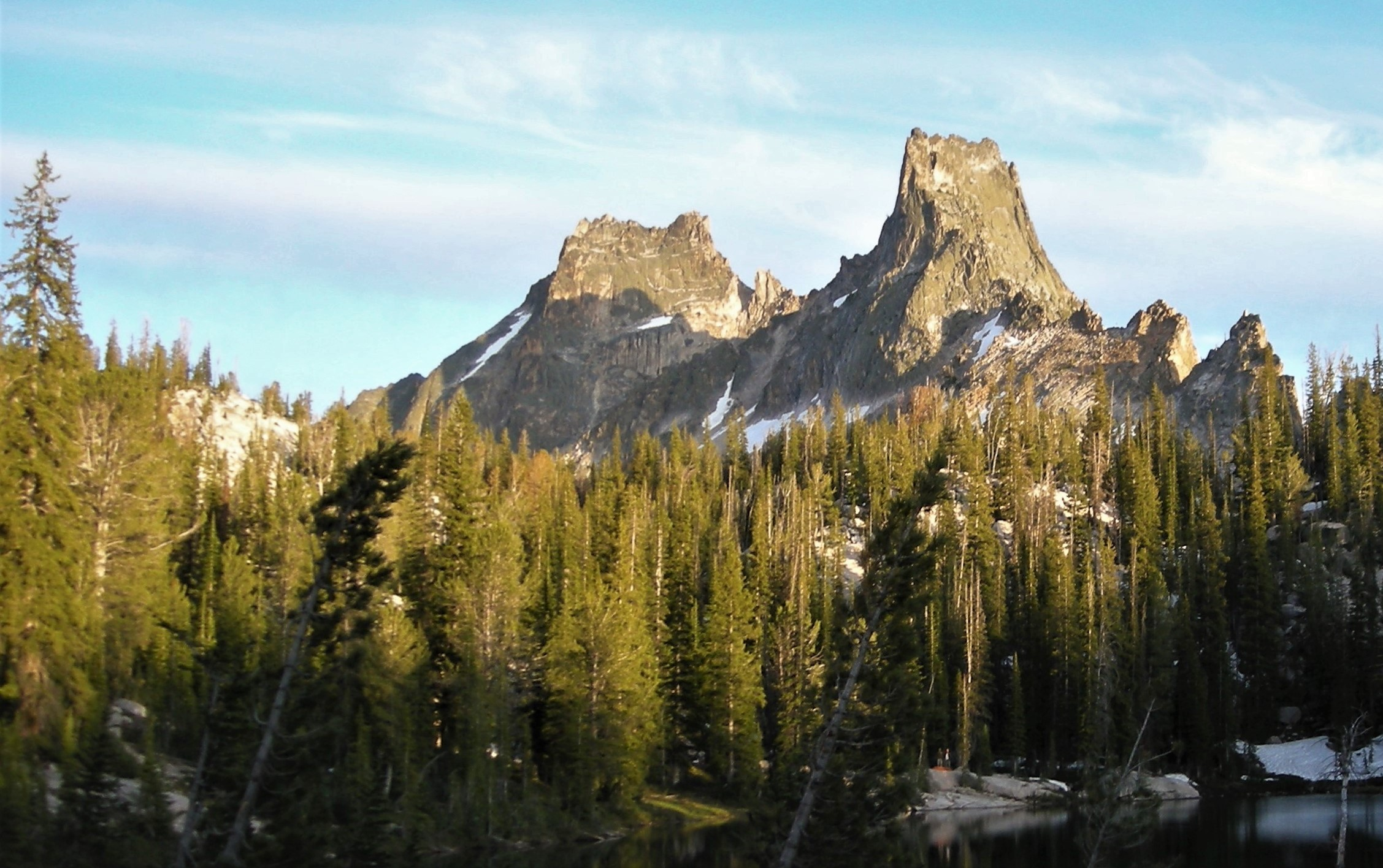
- Packrat Peak (center) and "Mayan Temple" (right)

Highest point
- Elevation: 10,240 ft (3,120 m)
- Prominence: 720 ft (220 m)
- Parent peak: Elk Peak
- Coordinates: 44°03′38″N 115°02′07″W

Geography
- Location within Idaho
- Location: Boise and Custer counties, Idaho, U.S.
- Parent range: Sawtooth Range
- Topo map: USGS Warbonnet Peak

Climbing
- Easiest route: class 5.1

Packrat Peak, at 10,240 feet (3,120 m) above sea level is a peak in the Sawtooth Range of Idaho in the United States. The peak is located in the Sawtooth Wilderness of Sawtooth National Recreation Area on the border of Boise and Custer counties. The peak is located 2.38 mi (3.83 km) north of Elk Peak, its line parent. Warbonnet and Little Warbonnet lakes are in the basin north of the peak.

== See also ==
- What's a Packrat?
- List of peaks of the Sawtooth Range (Idaho)
- List of mountains of Idaho
- List of mountain peaks of Idaho
- List of mountain ranges in Idaho
