= Hummock Lake =

Lake in the state of Idaho

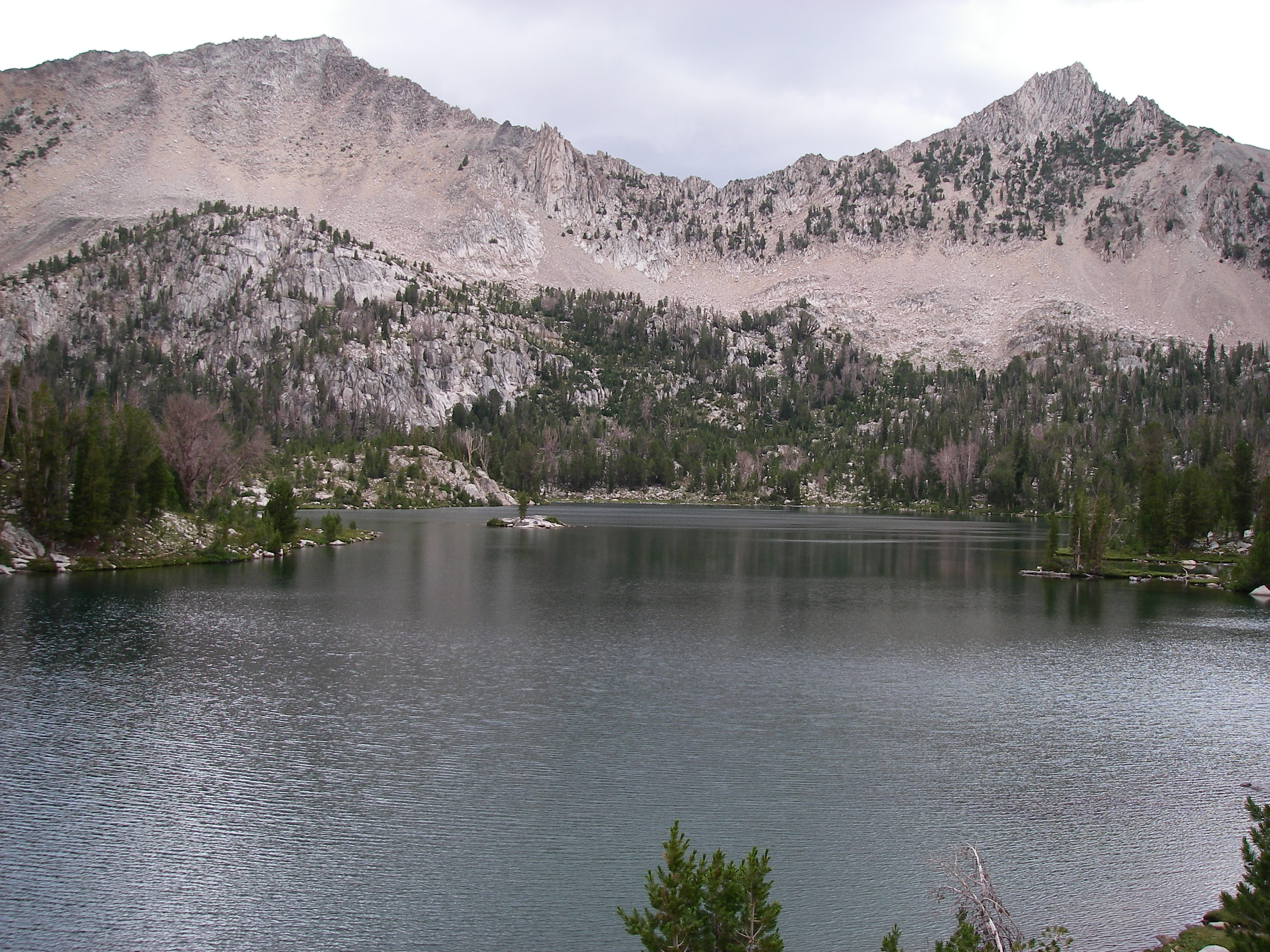

- Location within Idaho Location within the United States
- Location: Custer County, Idaho
- Coordinates: 44°04′39″N 114°35′32″W
- Type: Glacial
- Primary outflows: Little Boulder Creek to East Fork Salmon River
- Basin countries: United States
- Max. length: 1,610 ft (490 m)
- Max. width: 794 ft (242 m)
- Surface area: 16.5 acres (6.7 ha)
- Surface elevation: 9,518 ft (2,901 m)

Hummock Lake is an alpine lake in Custer County, Idaho, United States, located in the White Cloud Mountains in the Sawtooth National Recreation Area. The lake is accessed from Sawtooth National Forest trail 683.

Hummock Lake is northwest of Merriam Peak and located in the lower section of the Boulder Chain Lakes Basin.

== See also ==
- List of lakes of the White Cloud Mountains
- Headwall Lake
- Hourglass Lake
- Scoop Lake
- Sawtooth National Recreation Area
- White Cloud Mountains
