= Baron Lake =

Baron Lake may refer to:

- Baron Lake (Idaho), a lake in Boise County, Idaho
  - Little Baron Lake
  - Upper Baron Lake
- Gerard Lake (1744–1808), 1st Baron Lake, British general
