= Hidden Lake (White Cloud Mountains) =

Lake in Idaho, United States

- Location within Idaho Location within the United States
- Location: Custer County, Idaho
- Coordinates: 44.078929°N 114.595631°W
- Lake type: Glacial
- Primary outflows: Little Boulder Creek to East Fork Salmon River
- Basin countries: United States
- Max. length: 350 m (1,150 ft)
- Max. width: 212 m (696 ft)
- Surface elevation: 2,905 m (9,531 ft)

Hidden Lake is an alpine lake in Custer County, Idaho, United States, located in the White Cloud Mountains in the Sawtooth National Recreation Area. The lake is accessed from Sawtooth National Forest trail 683.

Hidden Lake is northwest of Merriam Peak and located in the lower section of the Boulder Chain Lakes Basin.

== See also ==
- List of lakes of the White Cloud Mountains
- Sawtooth National Recreation Area
- White Cloud Mountains
