= Blue Rock Lake =

Alpine lake in the state of Idaho

- Location within Idaho Location within the United States
- Location: Boise County, Idaho
- Coordinates: 44°03′51″N 115°03′27″W
- Type: Glacial
- Primary outflows: Goat Creek to South Fork Payette River
- Basin countries: United States
- Max. length: 0.13 mi (0.21 km)
- Max. width: 0.09 mi (0.14 km)
- Surface elevation: 8,243 ft (2,512 m)

For the Australian 'Blue Rock Lake' see Blue Rock Dam

Blue Rock Lake is a small alpine lake in Boise County, Idaho, United States, located in the Sawtooth Mountains in the Sawtooth National Recreation Area. There are no trails leading to the lake or the Goat Creek drainage.

Blue Rock Lake is in the Sawtooth Wilderness, and a wilderness permit can be obtained at a registration box at trailheads or wilderness boundaries. The Feather Lakes, Warbonnet Lake, and Little Warbonnet Lake are upstream of Blue Rock Lake.

== See also ==
- List of lakes of the Sawtooth Mountains (Idaho)
- Sawtooth National Forest
- Sawtooth National Recreation Area
- Sawtooth Range (Idaho)
