= Scoop Lake =

Lake in the state of Idaho

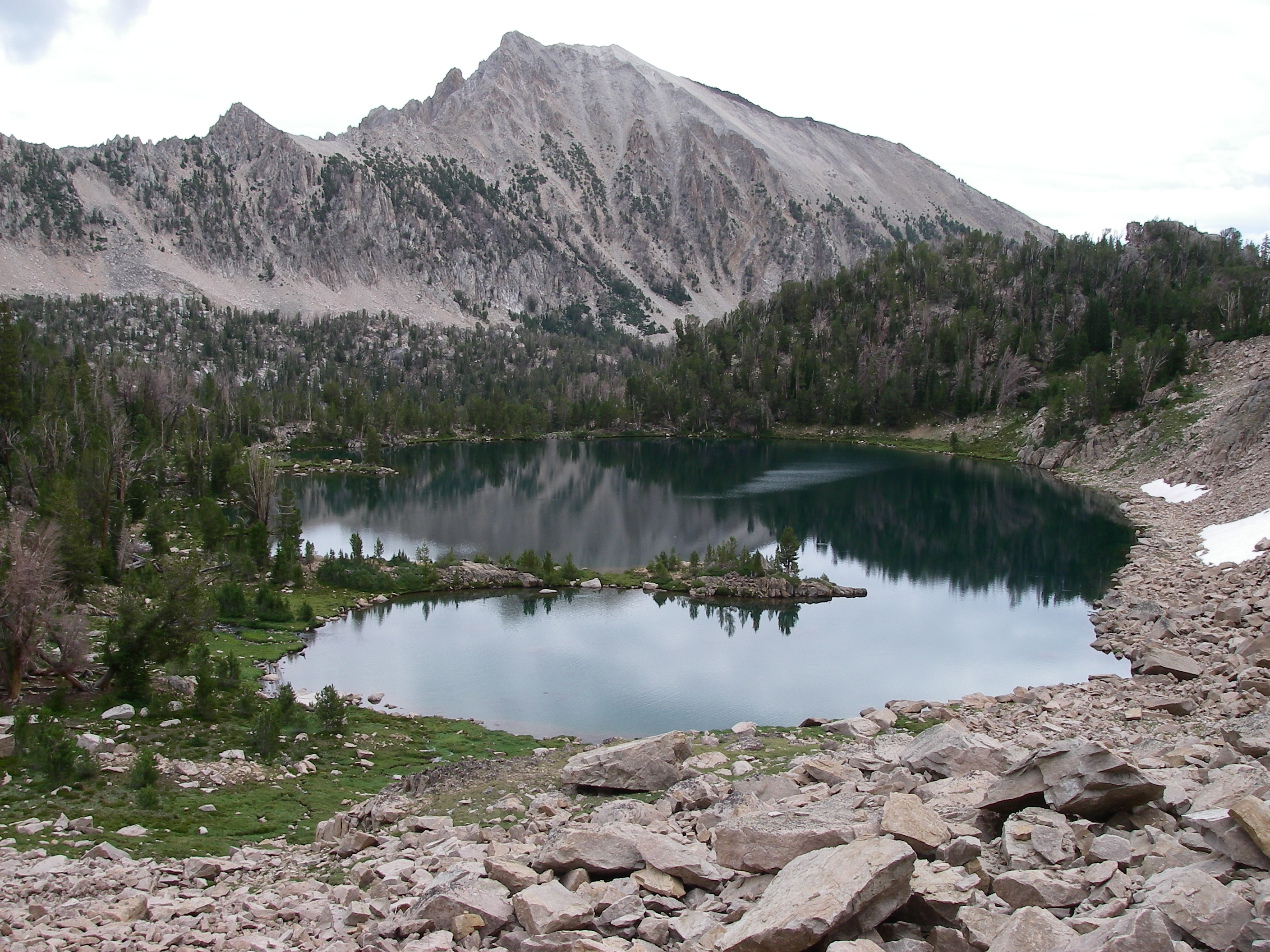

- Location within Idaho Location within the United States
- Location: Custer County, Idaho
- Coordinates: 44°04′24″N 114°35′39″W
- Type: Glacial
- Primary outflows: Little Boulder Creek to East Fork Salmon River
- Basin countries: United States
- Max. length: 842 ft (257 m)
- Max. width: 535 ft (163 m)
- Surface area: 8.2 acres (3.3 ha)
- Surface elevation: 9,649 ft (2,941 m)

Scoop Lake is an alpine lake in Custer County, Idaho, United States, located in the White Cloud Mountains in the Sawtooth National Recreation Area. The lake is accessed from Sawtooth National Forest trail 683.

Scoop Lake is northwest of Merriam Peak and located in the lower section of the Boulder Chain Lakes Basin.

== Origin of name ==
In 1970, Dan Pence, District Forest Ranger of Challis National Forest submitted a USDA Forest Service Form FS-7100-48 titled "Proposal of Name for an Unnamed Domestic Feature", in which it was proposed that this lake be named "Scoop Lake". Under the section titled "Description and extent of feature," Pence wrote, "A glacier obviously spilled down from the lake above, scooped this lake out of solid rock in the area, and moved on to form lakes below." Under the section titled "If the name is descriptive, state why it is appropriate," Pence wrote, "For apparent glacial action forming the lake." The name was made official when the United States Board on Geographic Names approved it on January 9, 1973.

== See also ==
- List of lakes of the White Cloud Mountains
- Headwall Lake
- Hourglass Lake
- Shelf Lake
- Sawtooth National Recreation Area
- White Cloud Mountains
