= Feather Lakes (Idaho) =

Alpine lakes in the state of Idaho

McGown Lakes
- Location within Idaho Location within the United States
- Interactive map of McGown Lakes
- Location: Sawtooth National Recreation Area; Boise County, Idaho
- Type: Alpine glacial lakes
- Etymology: McGowan Peak
- River sources: Goat Creek
- Basin countries: United States
- Managing agency: National Park Service
- Surface elevation: 8,796–8,829 feet (2,681–2,691 m)

The Feather Lakes are a chain of four small alpine glacial lakes in Boise County, Idaho, United States, located in the Sawtooth Mountains in the Sawtooth National Recreation Area. The lakes are located on Goat Creek which is a tributary of the South Fork Payette River. There are no trails leading to the lakes or the Goat Creek drainage.

The Feather Lakes are in the Sawtooth Wilderness, and a wilderness permit can be obtained at a registration box at trailheads or wilderness boundaries. The lakes are upstream of Blue Rock Lake and downstream of Little Warbonnet Lake and Warbonnet Lake.

Feather Lakes
Lake	Elevation	Max. length	Max. width	Location
Feather Lake 1	2,681 m (8,796 ft)	050 m (160 ft)	30 m (98 ft)	
Feather Lake 2	2,682 m (8,799 ft)	080 m (260 ft)	65 m (213 ft)	
Feather Lake 3	2,688 m (8,819 ft)	145 m (476 ft)	65 m (213 ft)	
Feather Lake 4	2,691 m (8,829 ft)	110 m (360 ft)	50 m (160 ft)	

== See also ==
- List of lakes of the Sawtooth Mountains (Idaho)
- Sawtooth National Forest
- Sawtooth National Recreation Area
- Sawtooth Range (Idaho)

44.06735°N 115.051061°W 44.066869°N 115.050081°W 44.0664°N 115.048633°W 44.065622°N 115.0476°W
