= Monte Verita (Idaho) =

Mountain in Idaho, United States

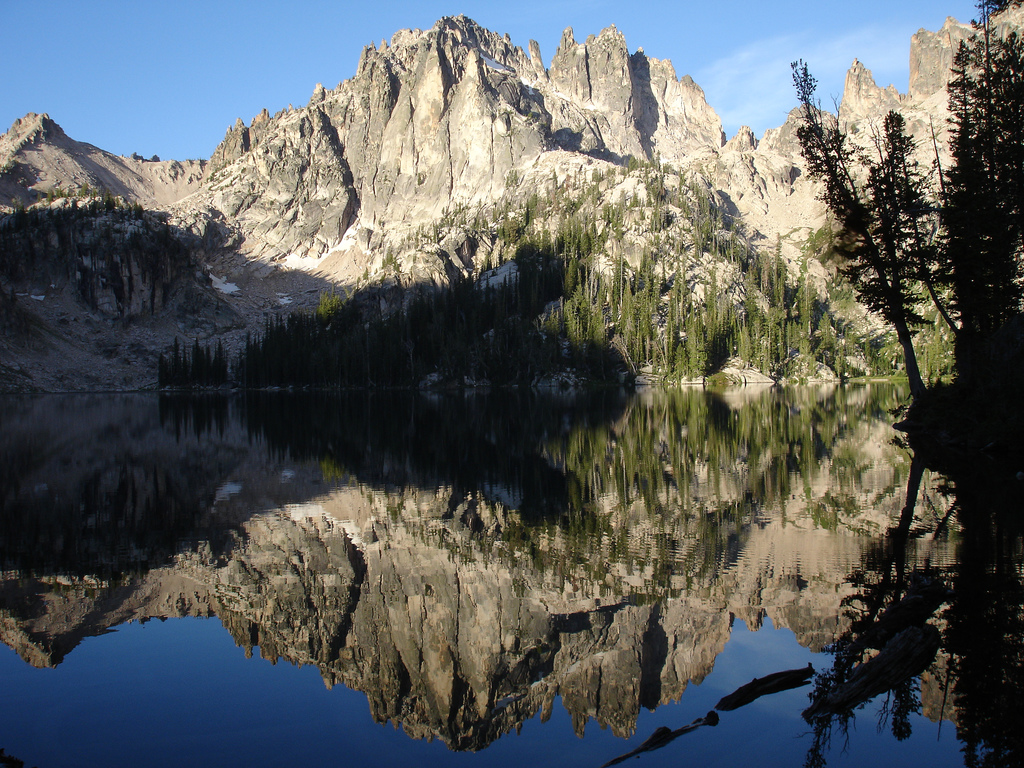
- Monte Verita reflected in Baron Lake

Highest point
- Elevation: 10,140 ft (3,091 m)
- Prominence: 640 ft (195 m)
- Parent peak: Cirque Lake Peak (10,210 ft)
- Isolation: 0.63 mi (1.01 km)
- Listing: Peaks of the Sawtooth Range
- Coordinates: 44°04′17″N 115°02′36″W

Geography
- Location within Idaho Location within the United States
- Location: Sawtooth National Recreation Area
- Country: United States of America
- State: Idaho
- County: Boise
- Parent range: Sawtooth Range; Rocky Mountains
- Topo map: USGS Warbonnet Peak

Geology
- Rock age: Eocene
- Mountain type: Fault block
- Rock type: Granite

Climbing
- Easiest route: class 4 scrambling

Monte Verita is a 10,140-foot elevation (3,091 m) mountain summit located in Boise County, Idaho, United States.

== Description ==
Monte Verita is part of the Sawtooth Range which is a subset of the Rocky Mountains. The mountain is situated 11 miles south-southwest of Stanley, Idaho, in the Sawtooth National Recreation Area. Precipitation runoff from the mountain's slopes drains to the South Fork Payette River via Baron and Goat Creeks. Topographic relief is significant as the summit rises over 1,800 feet (550 meters) above Baron Lake in one-half mile.

== Etymology ==
This landform's toponym was officially adopted in 1960 by the United States Board on Geographic Names. It is named for the fictional mountain in the Daphne du Maurier story, Monte Verità. The Italian word translates as "Mount Truth" or "Mountain of Truth".

== Climate ==
Based on the Köppen climate classification, Monte Verita is located in an alpine subarctic climate zone with long, cold, snowy winters, and cool to warm summers. Winter temperatures can drop below −10 °F with wind chill factors below −30 °F.

== Subpeaks ==
Granite towers and spires of Monte Verita

Peak	Height
Perforated Pinnacle	10,120 ft (3,085 m)
Tilted Slab	10,000 ft (3,048 m)
Leaning Tower of Pisa	9,920 ft (3,024 m)
Dinner Tower	9,920 ft (3,024 m)
Lunch Tower	9,920 ft (3,024 m)
Breakfast Tower	9,840 ft (2,999 m)
Damocles	9,840 ft (2,999 m)
Dessert Tower	9,800 ft (2,987 m)

== See also ==
- List of mountain peaks of Idaho
