= Lonesome Lake =

Lonesome Lake could refer to:

== United States ==
- Lonesome Lake (Idaho), an alpine lake in Custer County, Idaho
- Lonesome Lake (Montana), a lake located in Carbon County, Montana
- Lonesome Lake (New Hampshire), a lake located in Franconia Notch in the White Mountains of New Hampshire
- Lonesome Lake (Washington), a lake in the Mount Baker–Snoqualmie National Forest
- Lonesome Lake (Wyoming), a lake in the Wind River Range

== Canada ==
- Lonesome Lake (British Columbia), a lake located in Tweedsmuir South Provincial Park, British Columbia near Hunlen Falls
- Lonesome Lake (Nipissing District), Ontario
- Lonesome Lake (Algoma District), Ontario
