= Little Baron Lake =

Alpine lake in the state of Idaho

- Location within Idaho Location within the United States
- Location: Boise County, Idaho
- Coordinates: 44°05′16″N 115°02′02″W
- Type: Glacial
- Primary outflows: Baron Creek to South Fork Payette River
- Basin countries: United States
- Max. length: 0.15 mi (0.24 km)
- Max. width: 0.10 mi (0.16 km)
- Surface elevation: 8,153 ft (2,485 m)

Little Baron Lake is a small alpine lake in Boise County, Idaho, United States, located in the Sawtooth Mountains in the Sawtooth National Recreation Area. The lake is most easily accessed from Sawtooth National Forest trail 101.

Little Baron Lake is in the Sawtooth Wilderness, and a wilderness permit can be obtained at a registration box at trailheads or wilderness boundaries. Baron Lake and Upper Baron Lake are just to the south and uphill of Little Baron Lake. Warbonnet Peak at 10,210 ft (3,110 m) is southwest of Little Baron Lake.

== See also ==
- List of lakes of the Sawtooth Mountains (Idaho)
- Sawtooth National Forest
- Sawtooth National Recreation Area
- Sawtooth Range (Idaho)
