= Elk Peak =

Elk Peak can refer to the following mountains in the United States:

- Elk Peak (California) in Siskiyou County
- Elk Peak (Idaho), in Boise County
- Elk Peak (Fergus County, Montana), a mountain in Fergus County, Montana
- Elk Peak (Hill County, Montana), a mountain in Hill County, Montana
- Elk Peak (Meagher County, Montana), in the Castle Mountains, Meagher County, Montana
- Elk Peak (Oregon), near the West Fork Millicoma River, in Coos County, Oregon
- Elk Peak (Washington) in Lewis County
- Elk Peak (Wyoming) in Johnson County

== See also ==
- Black Elk Peak, South Dakota
- West Elk Peak, Colorado
