= Lodgepole Lake =

Alpine lake in the state of Idaho

- Location within Idaho Location within the United States
- Location: Custer County, Idaho
- Coordinates: 44°04′13″N 114°34′32″W
- Type: Glacial
- Primary outflows: Little Boulder Creek to East Fork Salmon River
- Basin countries: United States
- Max. length: 320 m (1,050 ft)
- Max. width: 295 m (968 ft)
- Surface elevation: 2,750 m (9,020 ft)

Lodgepole Lake is an alpine lake in Custer County, Idaho, United States, located in the White Cloud Mountains in the Sawtooth National Recreation Area. The lake is accessed from Sawtooth National Forest trail 683.

Lodgepole Lake is northeast of Merriam Peak and located in the lower section of the Boulder Chain Lakes Basin.

== See also ==
- List of lakes of the White Cloud Mountains
- Sawtooth National Recreation Area
- White Cloud Mountains
