= Hatchet Lake =

Hatchet Lake may refer to:

== Canada ==
- Hatchet Lake (Halifax Regional Municipality)
- Hatchet Lake (Saskatchewan), a lake in Saskatchewan
  - Hatchet Lake Airport, an airport in Saskatchewan near the kake
  - Hatchet Lake Water Aerodrome, an Aerodrome on the lake
- Hatchet Lake Denesuline First Nation, a Dene First Nation in northern Saskatchewan
- Hatchet Lake (Cochrane District), a lake in Cochrane District, Ontario
- Hatchet Lake (Mulcahy Township, Kenora District), a lake in Kenora District, Ontario
- Hatchet Lake (Algoma District), a lake in Algoma District, Ontario
- Hatchet Lake (Sioux Narrows-Nestor Falls), a lake in Sioux Narrows-Nestor Falls, Ontario

== United States ==
- Hatchet Lake (Idaho), a lake in Custer County
