= Headwall Lake =

Lake in the state of Idaho

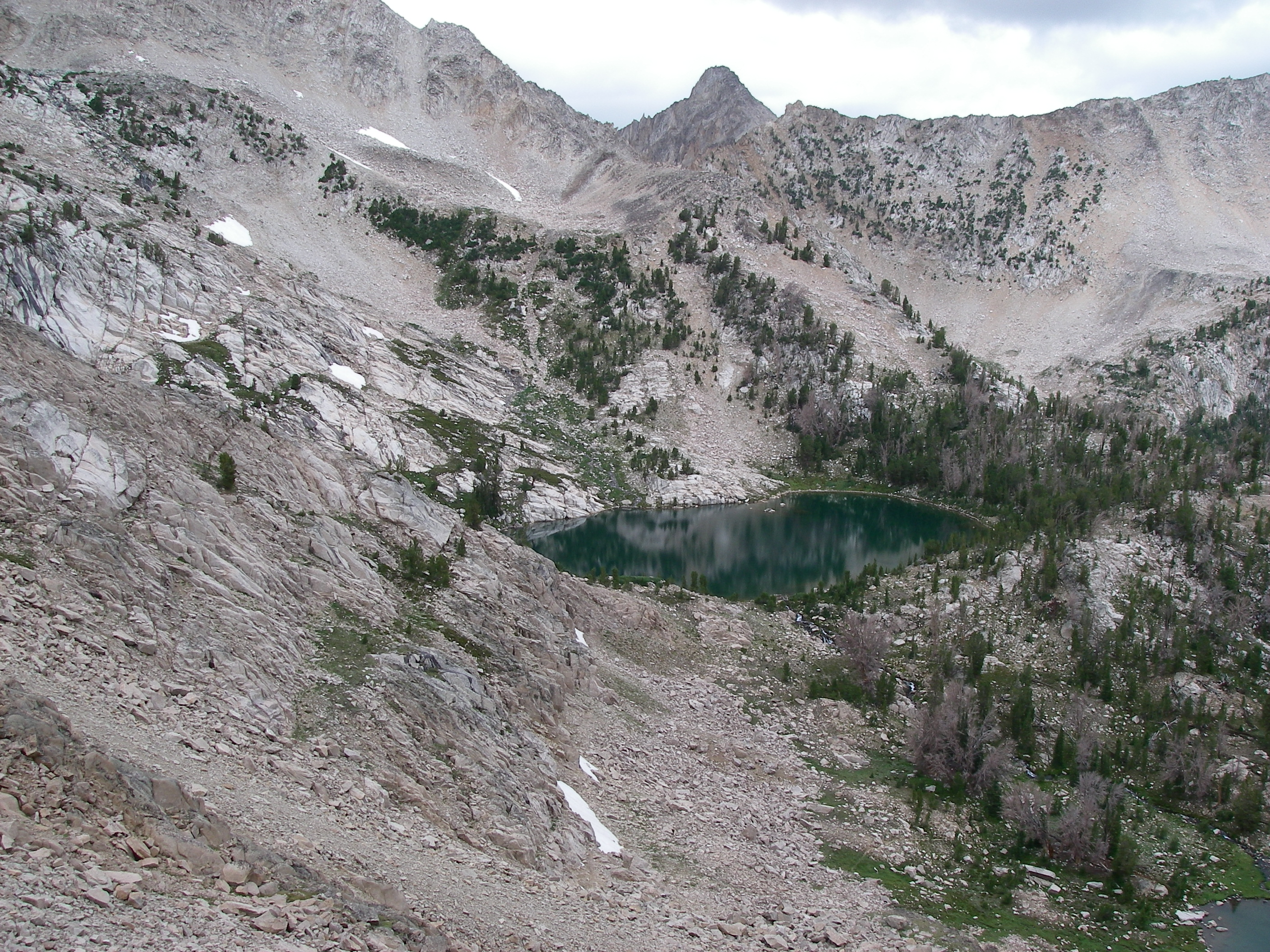

- Location within Idaho Location within the United States
- Location: Custer County, Idaho
- Coordinates: 44°04′28″N 114°35′54″W
- Type: Glacial
- Primary inflows: Snow melt
- Primary outflows: Little Boulder Creek to East Fork Salmon River
- Basin countries: United States
- Max. length: 840 ft (260 m)
- Max. width: 531 ft (162 m)
- Surface area: 7.0 acres (2.8 ha)
- Surface elevation: 9,760 ft (2,970 m)

Headwall Lake is an alpine lake in Custer County, Idaho, United States, located in the White Cloud Mountains in the Sawtooth National Recreation Area. The lake is accessed from Sawtooth National Forest trail 683.

Headwall Lake is northwest of Merriam Peak and located in the lower section of the Boulder Chain Lakes Basin.

== See also ==
- List of lakes of the White Cloud Mountains
- Hourglass Lake
- Hummock Lake
- Scoop Lake
- Sawtooth National Recreation Area
- White Cloud Mountains
