= Boulder Chain Lakes =

Alpine lakes in the state of Idaho

The Boulder Chain Lakes are a chain of thirteen alpine and glacial Paternoster lakes in Custer County, Idaho, United States, located in the White Cloud Mountains in the Sawtooth National Recreation Area. The lakes are located in the upper portion of the Little Boulder Creek watershed north of Merriam Peak. Sawtooth National Forest trail 683 along leads to the Boulder Chain Lakes.

Boulder Chain Lakes
Lake	Elevation	Max. length	Max. width	Location
Hatchet Lake	2,710 m (8,890 ft)	345 m (1,132 ft)	305 m (1,001 ft)	
Headwall Lake	2,975 m (9,760 ft)	256 m (840 ft)	162 m (531 ft)	
Hidden Lake	2,905 m (9,531 ft)	250 m (820 ft)	212 m (696 ft)	
Hourglass Lake	2,900 m (9,500 ft)	224 m (735 ft)	118 m (387 ft)	
Hummock Lake	2,905 m (9,531 ft)	490 m (1,610 ft)	242 m (794 ft)	
Lodgepole Lake	2,750 m (9,020 ft)	370 m (1,210 ft)	295 m (968 ft)	
Lonesome Lake	3,185 m (10,449 ft)	458 m (1,503 ft)	178 m (584 ft)	
Scoop Lake	2,945 m (9,662 ft)	276 m (906 ft)	156 m (512 ft)	
Shelf Lake	2,730 m (8,960 ft)	275 m (902 ft)	166 m (545 ft)	
Sliderock Lake	2,740 m (8,990 ft)	305 m (1,001 ft)	157 m (515 ft)	
Tiny Lake	2,905 m (9,531 ft)	061 m (200 ft)	046 m (151 ft)	
Waterdog Lake	2,660 m (8,730 ft)	060 m (200 ft)	025 m (82 ft)	
Willow Lake	2,665 m (8,743 ft)	260 m (850 ft)	163 m (535 ft)	

== See also ==
- List of lakes of the White Cloud Mountains
- Sawtooth National Forest
- Sawtooth National Recreation Area
- White Cloud Mountains

44.024344°N 114.562724°W 44.074340°N 114.598370°W 44.078929°N 114.595631°W 44.077962°N 114.588440°W 44.077480°N 114.592172°W 44.070403°N 114.575526°W 44.073839°N 114.607106°W 44.073226°N 114.594253°W 44.070398°N 114.567814°W 44.070568°N 114.571721°W 44.077179°N 114.589737°W 44.072499°N 114.557543°W 44.074092°N 114.560419°W
