= Cirque Lake Peak =

Mountain in the state of Idaho

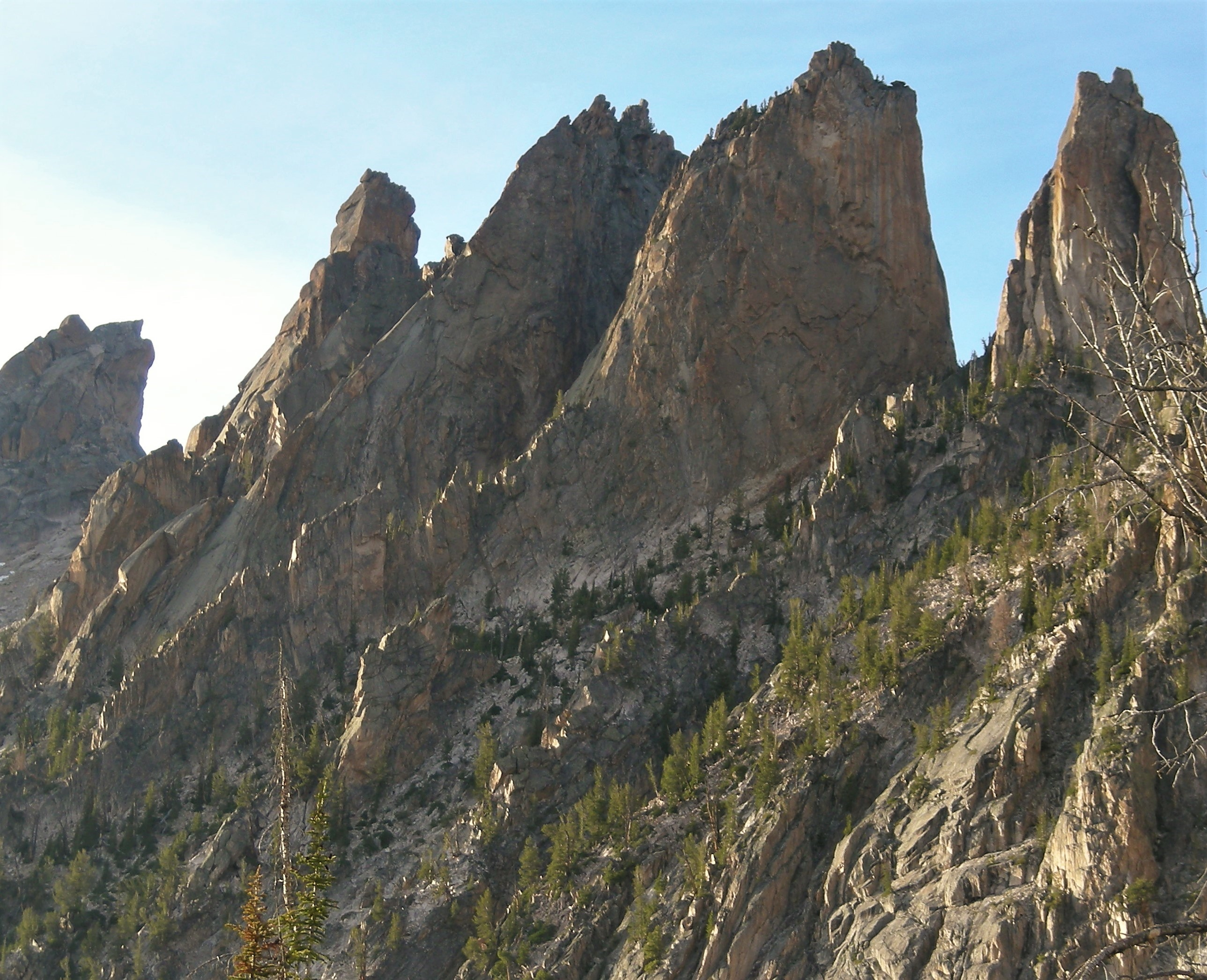
- South aspect

Highest point
- Elevation: 10,210 ft (3,110 m)
- Prominence: 730 ft (220 m)
- Parent peak: Packrat Peak
- Coordinates: 44°04′41″N 115°03′03″W

Geography
- Location within Idaho
- Location: Boise County, Idaho, U.S.
- Parent range: Sawtooth Range
- Topo map: USGS Warbonnet Peak

Climbing
- Easiest route: Simple climbing, class 4

Cirque Lake Peak, at 10,210 feet (3,110 m) above sea level is a peak in the Sawtooth Range of Idaho. The peak is located in the Sawtooth Wilderness of Sawtooth National Recreation Area in Boise County. The peak is located 1.39 mi (2.24 km) north-northwest of Packrat Peak, its line parent.
