= Little Warbonnet Lake =

Alpine lake in the state of Idaho

- Location within Idaho Location within the United States
- Location: Boise County, Idaho
- Coordinates: 44°03′48″N 115°02′35″W
- Type: Glacial
- Primary outflows: Goat Creek to South Fork Payette River
- Basin countries: United States
- Max. length: 0.12 mi (0.19 km)
- Max. width: 0.10 mi (0.16 km)
- Surface elevation: 8,915 ft (2,717 m)

Little Warbonnet Lake is a small alpine lake in Boise County, Idaho, United States, located in the Sawtooth Mountains in the Sawtooth National Recreation Area. There are no trails leading to the lake or the Goat Creek drainage.

Little Warbonnet Lake is in the Sawtooth Wilderness, and a wilderness permit can be obtained at a registration box at trailheads or wilderness boundaries. Warbonnet Lake is upstream of Little Warbonnet Lake while the Feather Lakes and Blue Rock Lake are downstream. Packrat Peak is just to the south of the lake.

== See also ==
- List of lakes of the Sawtooth Mountains (Idaho)
- Sawtooth National Forest
- Sawtooth National Recreation Area
- Sawtooth Range (Idaho)
