= Baron Lake (Idaho) =

Alpine lake in the state of Idaho

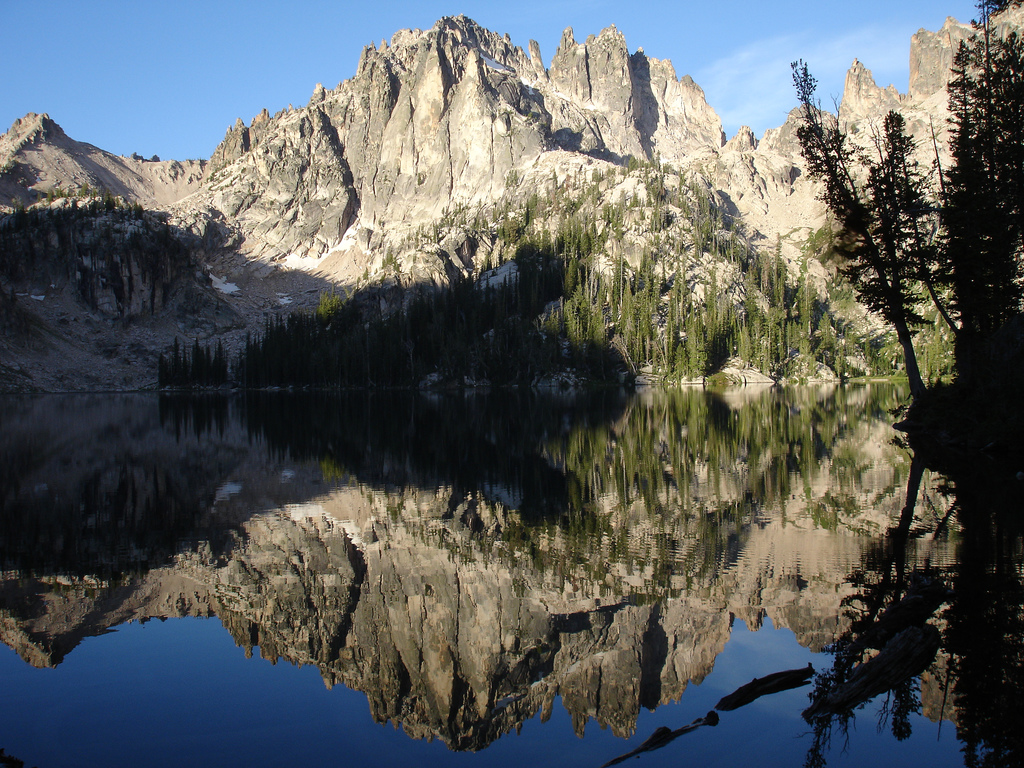
- Baron Lake and Monte Verita

- Location in Idaho Location in the United States
- Location: Boise County, Idaho
- Coordinates: 44°04′54″N 115°01′58″W
- Type: Glacial
- Primary outflows: Baron Creek to South Fork Payette River
- Basin countries: United States
- Max. length: 0.48 mi (0.77 km)
- Max. width: 0.30 mi (0.48 km)
- Surface area: 49 acres (20 ha)
- Surface elevation: 8,317 ft (2,535 m)

Baron Lake is an alpine lake in Boise County, Idaho, United States, located in the Sawtooth Mountains in the Sawtooth National Recreation Area. Sawtooth National Forest trail 101 goes to the lake.

Baron Lake is in the Sawtooth Wilderness, and a wilderness permit can be obtained at a registration box at trailheads or wilderness boundaries. Upper Baron Lake is upstream of Baron Lake while Little Baron Lake is downhill, but not in the same sub-basin. Warbonnet Peak at 10,210 ft (3,110 m) is west of the lake.

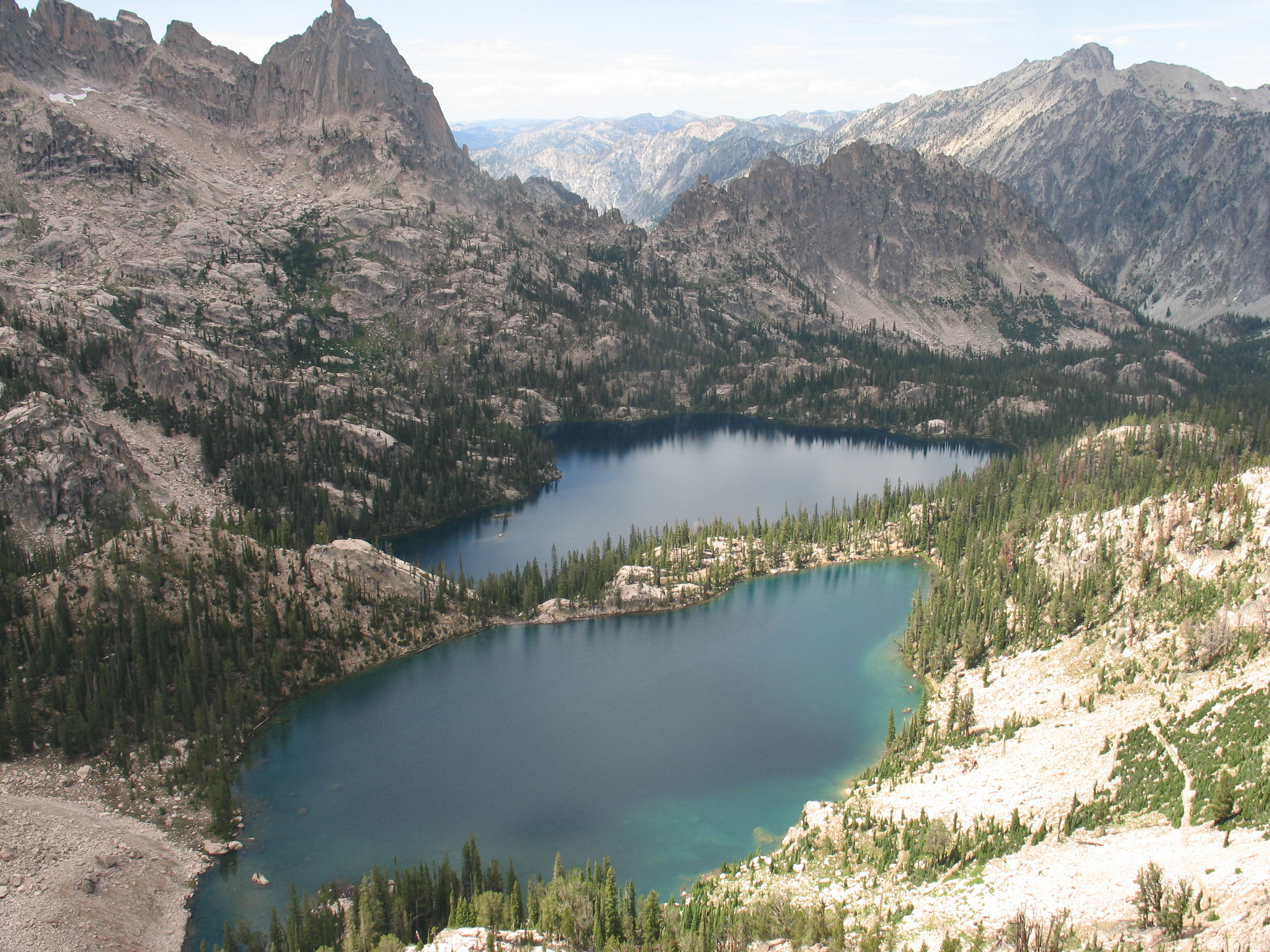
Baron Lake (at top) and Upper Baron Lake

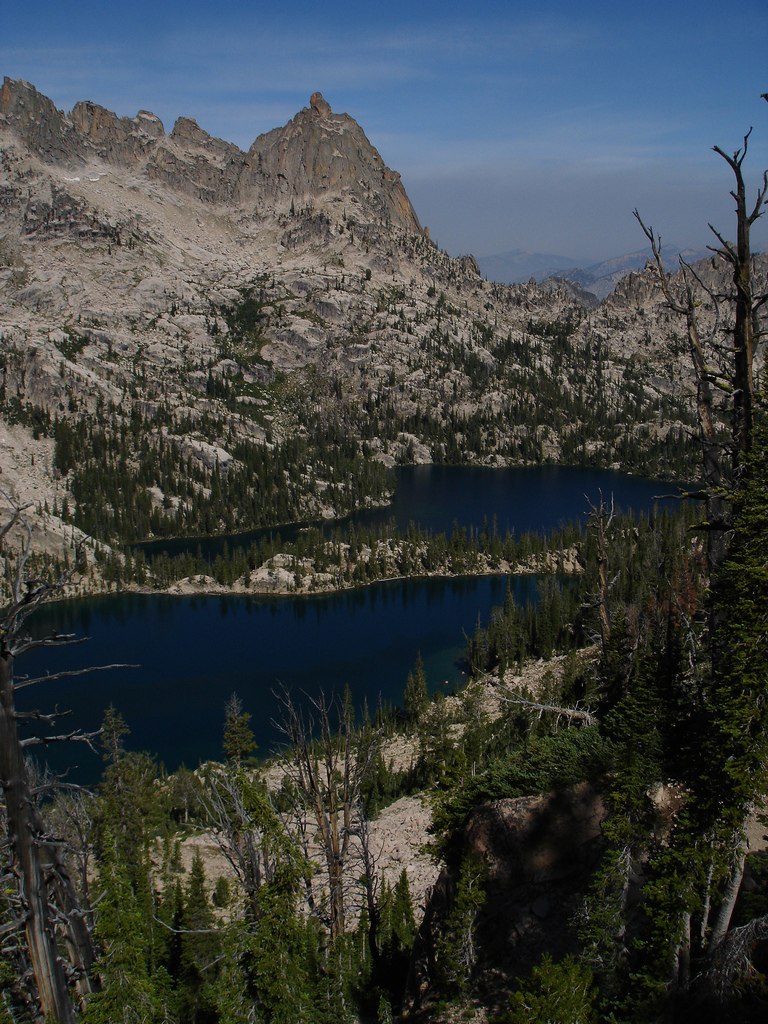
The Baron Lakes

== See also ==
- List of lakes of the Sawtooth Mountains (Idaho)
- Sawtooth National Forest
- Sawtooth National Recreation Area
- Sawtooth Range (Idaho)
