= Upper Baron Lake =

Alpine lake in the state of Idaho

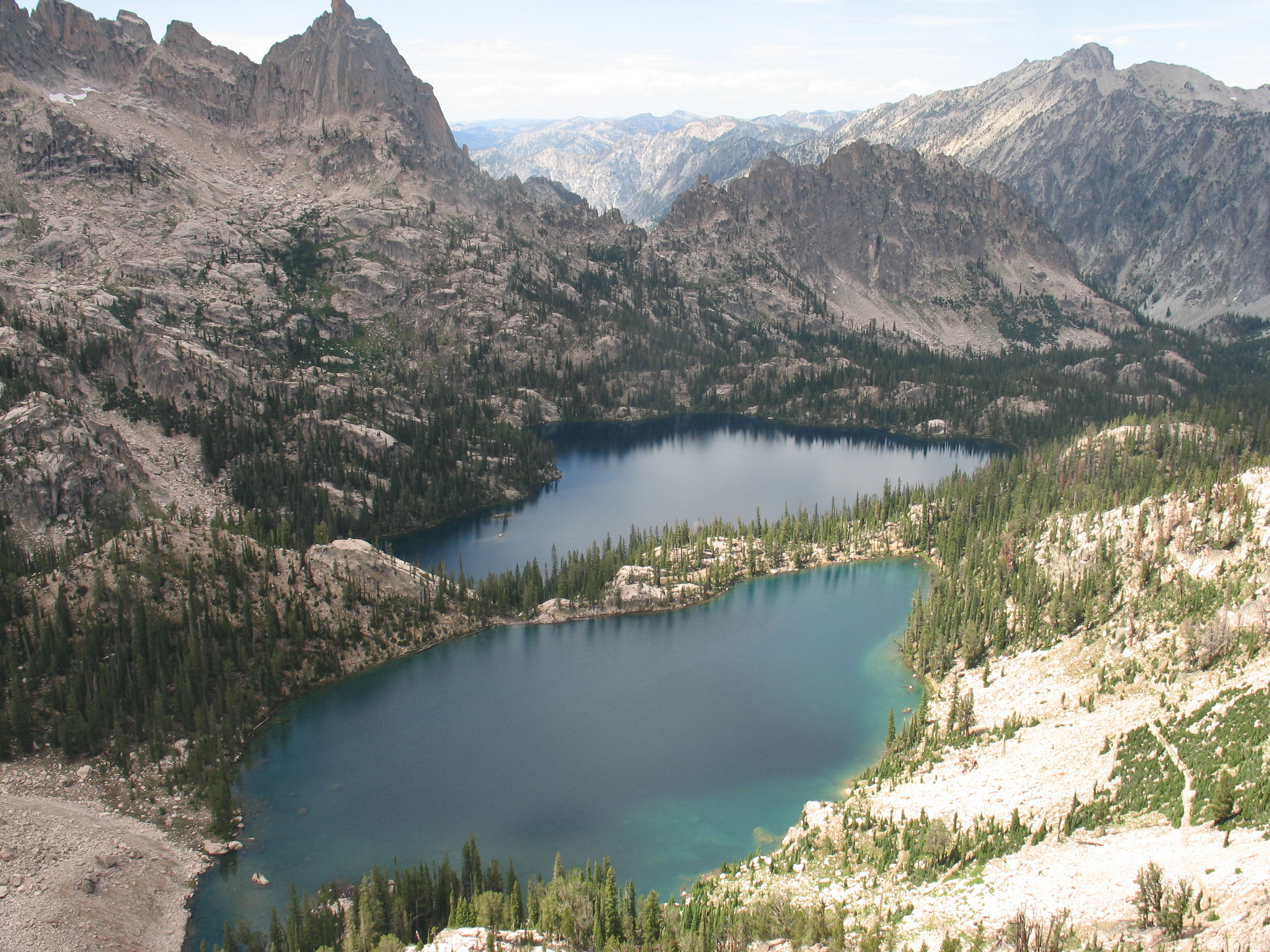
- Upper Baron Lake (at bottom) and Baron Lake

- Location within Idaho Location within the United States
- Location: Boise County, Idaho
- Coordinates: 44°04′38″N 115°01′47″W
- Type: Glacial
- Primary outflows: Baron Creek to South Fork Payette River
- Basin countries: United States
- Max. length: 0.32 mi (0.51 km)
- Max. width: 0.16 mi (0.26 km)
- Surface elevation: 8,505 ft (2,592 m)

Upper Baron Lake is a small alpine lake in Boise County, Idaho, United States, located in the Sawtooth Mountains in the Sawtooth National Recreation Area. Sawtooth National Forest trail 101 goes to the lake.

Upper Baron Lake is in the Sawtooth Wilderness, and a wilderness permit can be obtained at a registration box at trailheads or wilderness boundaries. Baron Lake is downstream of Upper Baron Lake while Warbonnet Peak at 10,210 ft (3,110 m) is west of the lake.

== See also ==
- List of lakes of the Sawtooth Mountains (Idaho)
- Sawtooth National Forest
- Sawtooth National Recreation Area
- Sawtooth Range (Idaho)
