= Lake Cadagno =

- Lago di Cadagno (Italian)
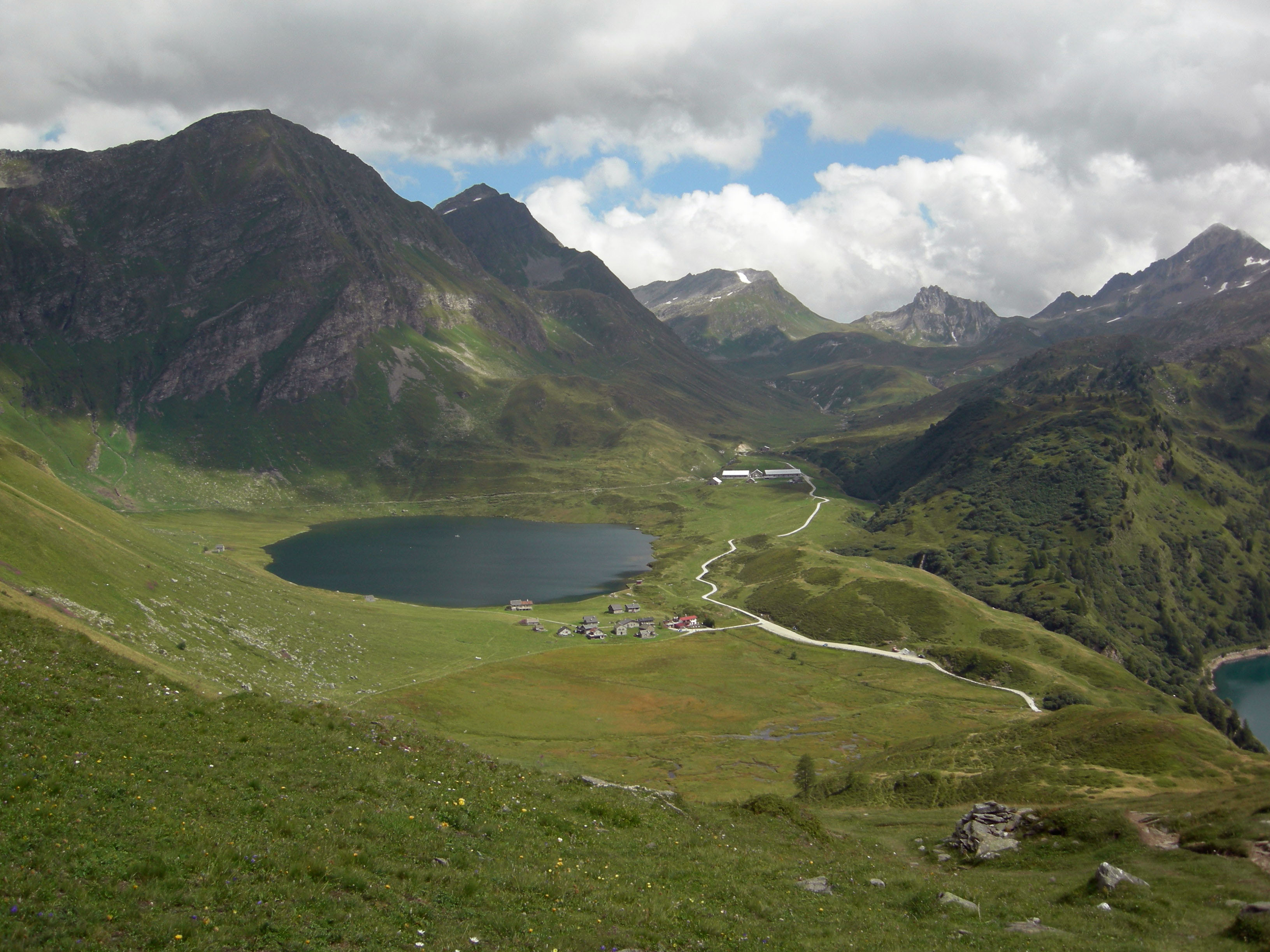

- Location within Canton of Ticino Location within Switzerland Location within Alps
- Interactive map of Lake Cadagno
- Location: Piora Valley, Ticino
- Coordinates: 46°32′59″N 8°42′41″E
- Type: meromictic, reservoir
- Catchment area: 2.51 km^{2} (0.97 sq mi)
- Basin countries: Switzerland
- Max. length: 842 m (2,762 ft)
- Max. width: 423 m (1,388 ft)
- Surface area: 0.26 km^{2} (0.10 sq mi)
- Max. depth: 21 m (69 ft) (summer)
- Water volume: 2,420,000 m^{3} (1,960 acre⋅ft) (summer)
- Surface elevation: 1,921.2 m (6,303 ft)

Lake Cadagno (Italian: Lago di Cadagno) is a meromictic lake in the Piora valley (canton of Ticino), Switzerland. As one of a few meromictic lakes in Europe, it is the object of numerous scientific studies. The Piora valley - located in the Saint-Gotthard Massif (central Swiss Alps) in the Southern part of Switzerland near Airolo at an altitude of 1921 m above sea level - is a landlocked alpine valley whose scientific value has been recognized for more than two centuries. In the past, the lake was used as a reservoir.

Lake Cadagno is a rare example of crenogenic meromixis. Its waters show a permanent stratification due to a natural geological phenomenon. The lower abounds with dissolved mineral salts (sulphate, magnesium, calcium, carbonate) originating from sublacustrine springs, whereas the separate upper layer is permanently oxygenated. Anaerobic phototrophic bacteria – among them Chromatium okenii—thrive between the two layers where they find the ideal conditions for their development. Such an ecosystem provides a good opportunity to study the metabolisms connected with eutrophication on a stable model, as it is well known that one of the advanced stages of eutrophication is biogenic meromixis.

== Research ==
For the last 25 years the area has been increasingly used for scientific purposes, both for teaching and researching various environmental subjects. In view of stimulating educational and scientific activities at a university level, the Alpine Biology Center (ABC) has been set up by the Canton of Ticino, in cooperation with the universities of Geneva and Zurich. For this purpose, two 16th-century buildings of the Alpe Piora have been turned into a laboratory and lodgings. The Microbiology Institute of the canton of Ticino is responsible both for managing the center and coordinating its activities.

Cyclobotryococcatriene, a botryococcene-related hydrocarbon, was isolated from and identified in organic-rich sediments in Lake Cadagno in 2000.

== See also ==
- List of mountain lakes of Switzerland
