= Elk Peak (Idaho) =

Mountain in the state of Idaho

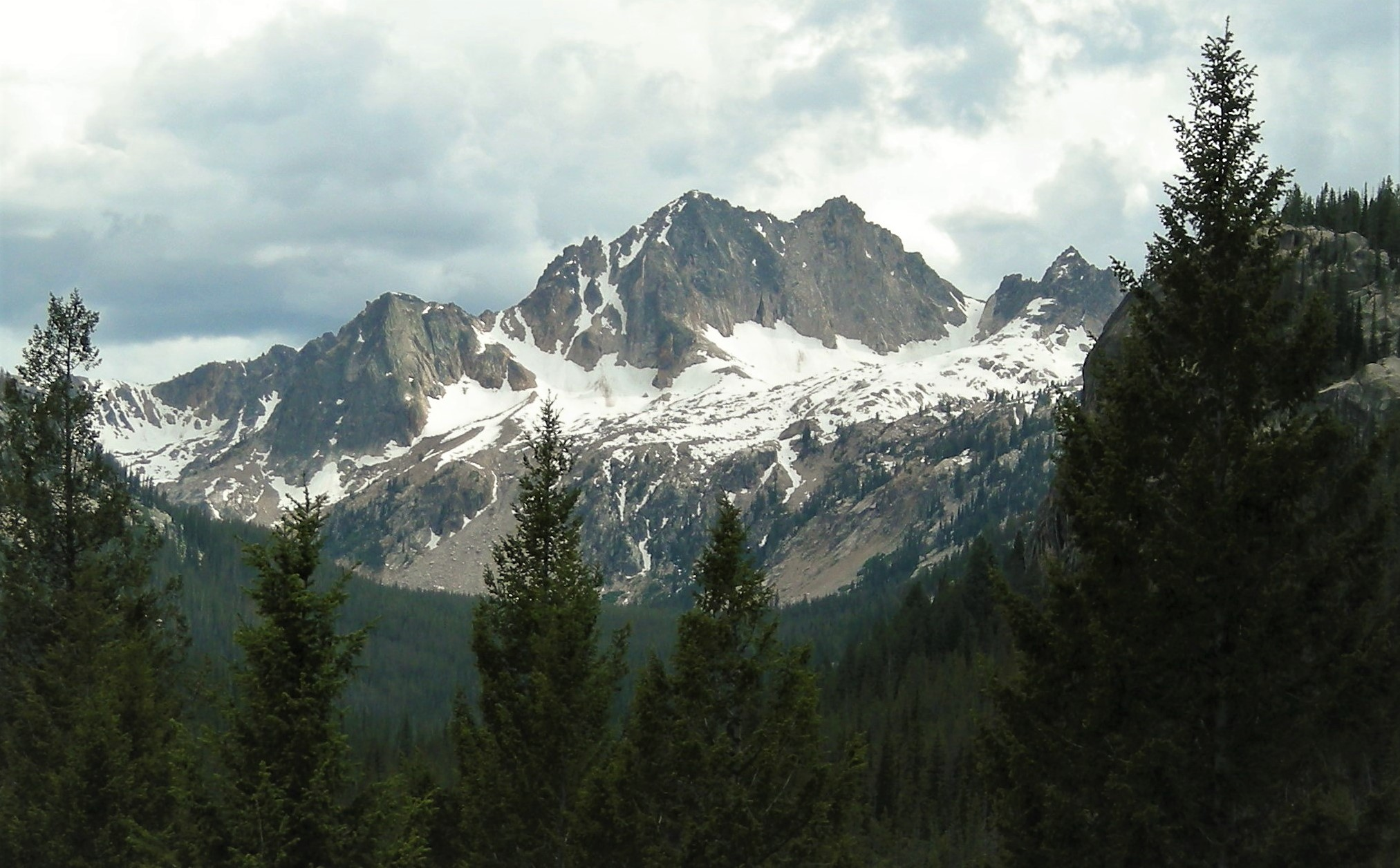
- North aspect

Highest point
- Elevation: 10,582 ft (3,225 m)
- Prominence: 1,182 ft (360 m)
- Parent peak: Mount Cramer
- Coordinates: 44°01′28″N 115°02′14″W

Geography
- Location within Idaho
- Location: Boise and Custer counties, Idaho, U.S.
- Parent range: Sawtooth Range
- Topo map: USGS Warbonnet Peak

Climbing
- Easiest route: Simple climbing, class 3-4

Elk Peak, at 10,582 feet (3,225 m) above sea level, is the eighth-highest peak in the Sawtooth Range of the U.S. state of Idaho. The peak is located in the Sawtooth Wilderness of Sawtooth National Recreation Area in Boise and Custer counties. The peak is located 2.88 mi (4.63 km) west-northwest of Mount Cramer, its line parent. It is the 240th-highest peak in Idaho and 0.5 mi (0.80 km) south-southeast of Reward Peak.

== See also ==
- List of peaks of the Sawtooth Range (Idaho)
- List of mountains of Idaho
- List of mountain peaks of Idaho
- List of mountain ranges in Idaho
