= Warbonnet Peak (Idaho) =

Mountain in Idaho, United States

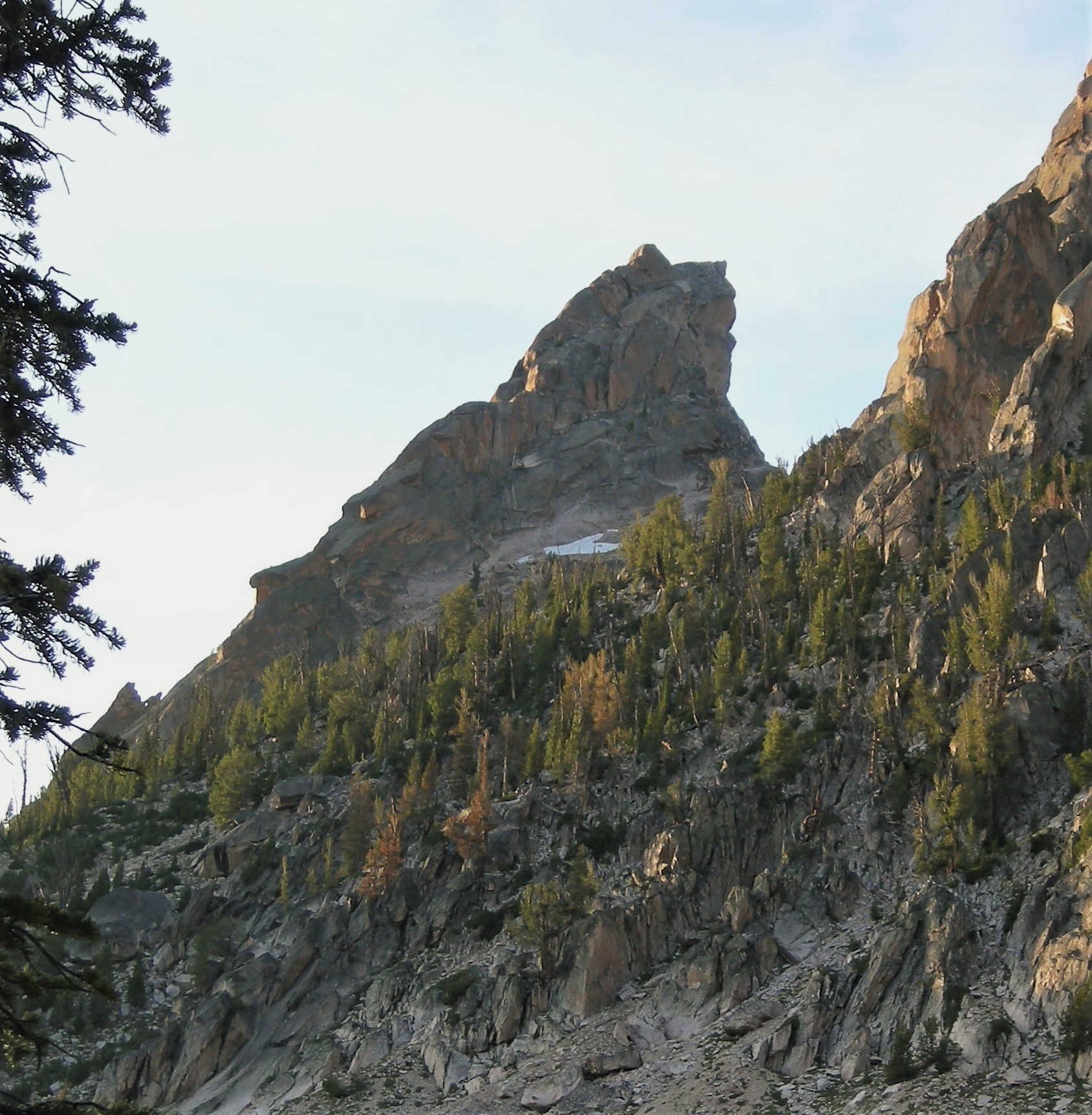
- Warbonnet Peak

Highest point
- Elevation: 10,200 ft (3,100 m)
- Prominence: 360 ft (110 m)
- Parent peak: Cirque Lake Peak
- Coordinates: 44°04′45″N 115°03′14″W

Geography
- Location within Idaho
- Location: Boise County, Idaho, U.S.
- Parent range: Sawtooth Range
- Topo map: USGS Warbonnet Peak

Climbing
- Easiest route: class 5.7

Warbonnet Peak is located in the Sawtooth Wilderness of Sawtooth National Recreation Area in Boise County. The peak is located 0.17 mi (0.27 km) west-northwest of Cirque Lake Peak, its line parent.
