= Alpine lake =

High-altitude lake in a mountainous zone

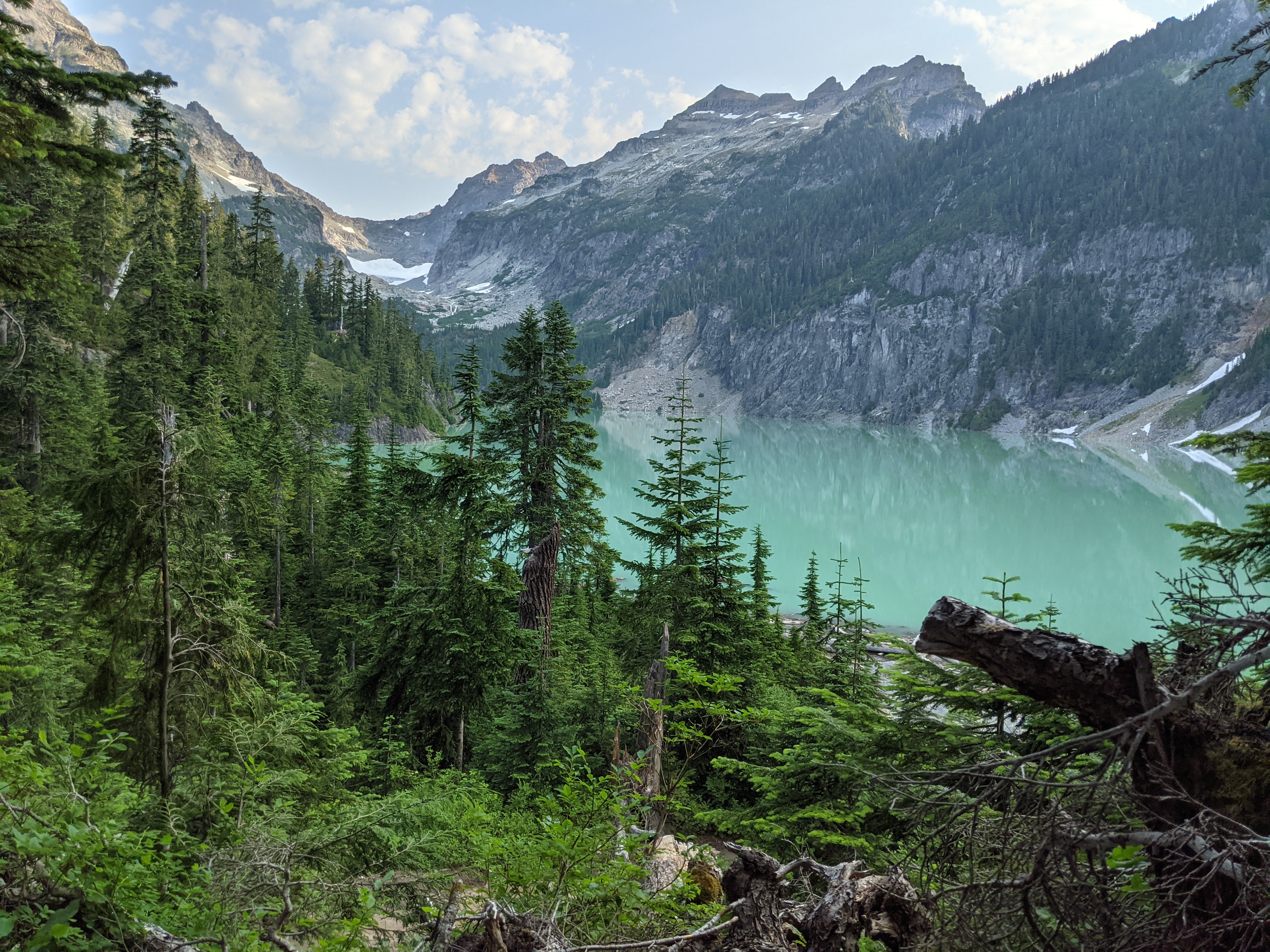
Blanca Lake in Washington, USA with the characteristic greenish water from glacial flour. The Columbia Glacier seen in the background is the main water source for this lake.

An alpine lake is a high-altitude lake in a mountainous area, usually near or above the tree line, with extended periods of ice cover. These lakes are commonly glacial lakes formed from glacial activity (either current or in the past) but can also be formed from geological processes such as volcanic activity (volcanogenic lakes) or landslides (barrier lakes). Many alpine lakes that are fed from glacial meltwater have the characteristic bright turquoise green color as a result of glacial flour, suspended minerals derived from a glacier scouring the bedrock. When active glaciers are not supplying water to the lake, such as a majority of Rocky Mountains alpine lakes in the United States, the lakes may still be bright blue due to the lack of algal growth resulting from cold temperatures, lack of nutrient run-off from surrounding land, and lack of sediment input. The coloration and mountain locations of alpine lakes attract lots of recreational activity.

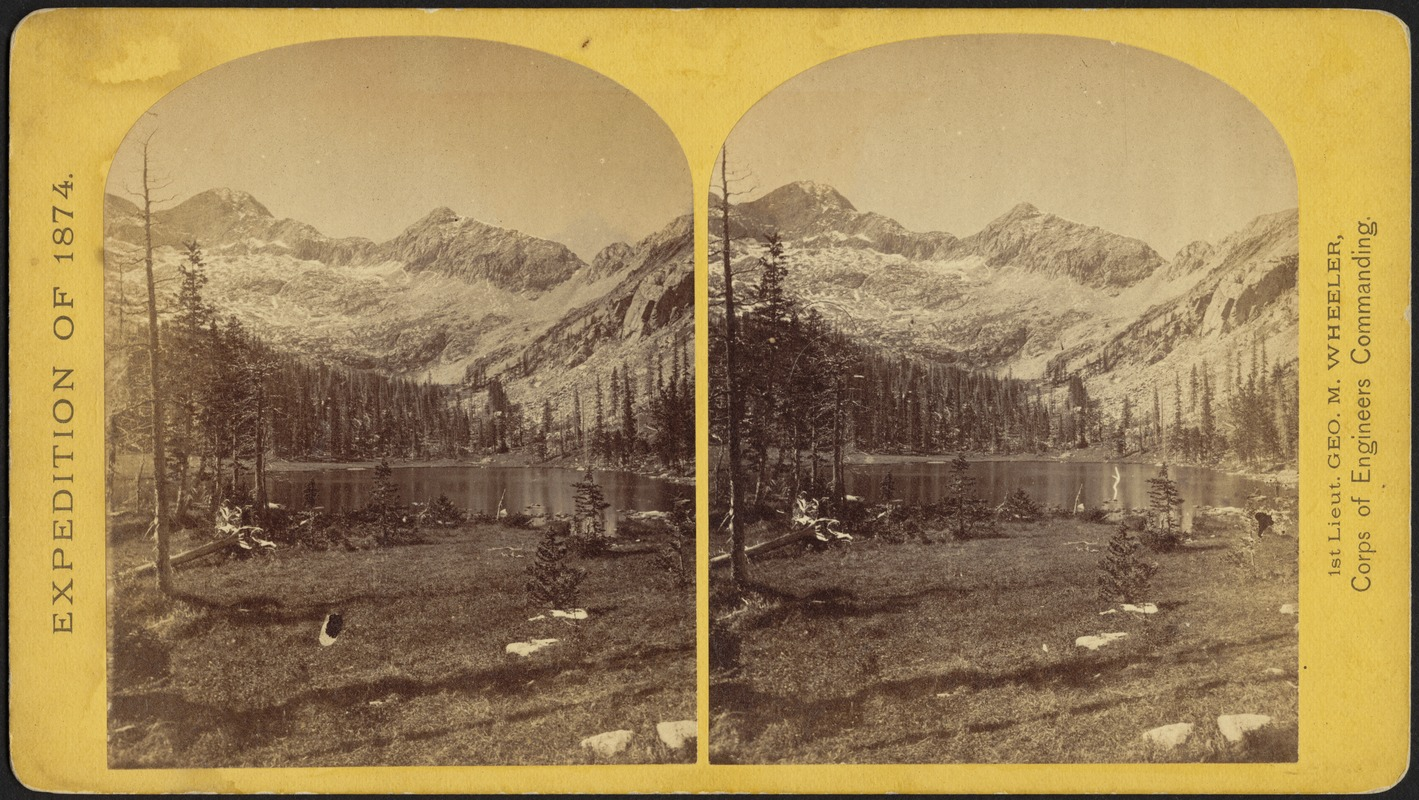
Alpine Lake, in the Cerro Blanco Mountains, Colorado, 1874. Photographs of the American West, Boston Public Library

Alpine lakes are some of the most abundant types of lakes on Earth. In the Swiss Alps alone, there are nearly 1,000 alpine lakes, most of which formed after the Little Ice Age. As global temperatures continue to rise, more alpine lakes will be formed as glaciers recede and provide more run-off to surrounding areas, and existing lakes will see more biogeochemical changes and ecosystem shifts. An alpine lake's trophic state (i.e., level of biological productivity) progresses with age (e.g., low productivity after formation and increased productivity with vegetation and soil maturity in the surrounding watershed), but anthropogenic effects such as agriculture and climate change are rapidly affecting productivity levels in some lakes. These lakes are sensitive ecosystems and are particularly vulnerable to climate change due to the highly pronounced changes to ice and snow cover. Due to the importance of alpine lakes as sources of freshwater for agricultural and human use, the physical, chemical, and biological responses to climate change are being extensively studied.

== Physical characteristics ==
=== Formation ===
Formation of a glacial lake.

Commonly, alpine lakes are formed from current or previous glacial activity (called glacial lakes) but could also be formed from other geological processes such as damming of water due to volcanic lava flows or debris, volcanic crater collapse, or landslides. Glacial lakes form when a glacier scours and depresses the bedrock as it moves downhill, and when the glacier retreats, the depressions are filled with glacier meltwater and run-off. These lakes are usually quite deep for this reason and some lakes that are several hundred meters deep may be caused by a process called overdeepening. In mountain valleys where glacier movement has formed circular depressions, cirque lakes (or tarns) may form when the water becomes dammed. When damming occurs due to debris from the glacier movement, these lakes are called moraine lakes. These dams of debris can be very resilient or may burst, causing extreme flooding which poses significant hazards to communities in the alpine, especially in the Himalayas. Kettle lakes also form from glacier recession but are formed when a section of ice breaks off from the receding glacier, causes a depression, and then melts. Some alpine lakes reside in depressions formed from glaciers that existed during the last Ice Age yet are no longer proximate to any glaciers and are being sourced from snow, rain, or groundwater.

Glacial alpine lakes have dramatically increased in number in recent years. From 1990 to 2018, the number of glacial lakes increased by 53% and the total glacial lake area increased by 51% due to global warming. Alpine lakes adjacent to glaciers may also result in a positive feedback due to decreased albedo of water relative to ice, creating larger lakes and causing more glacial melt.

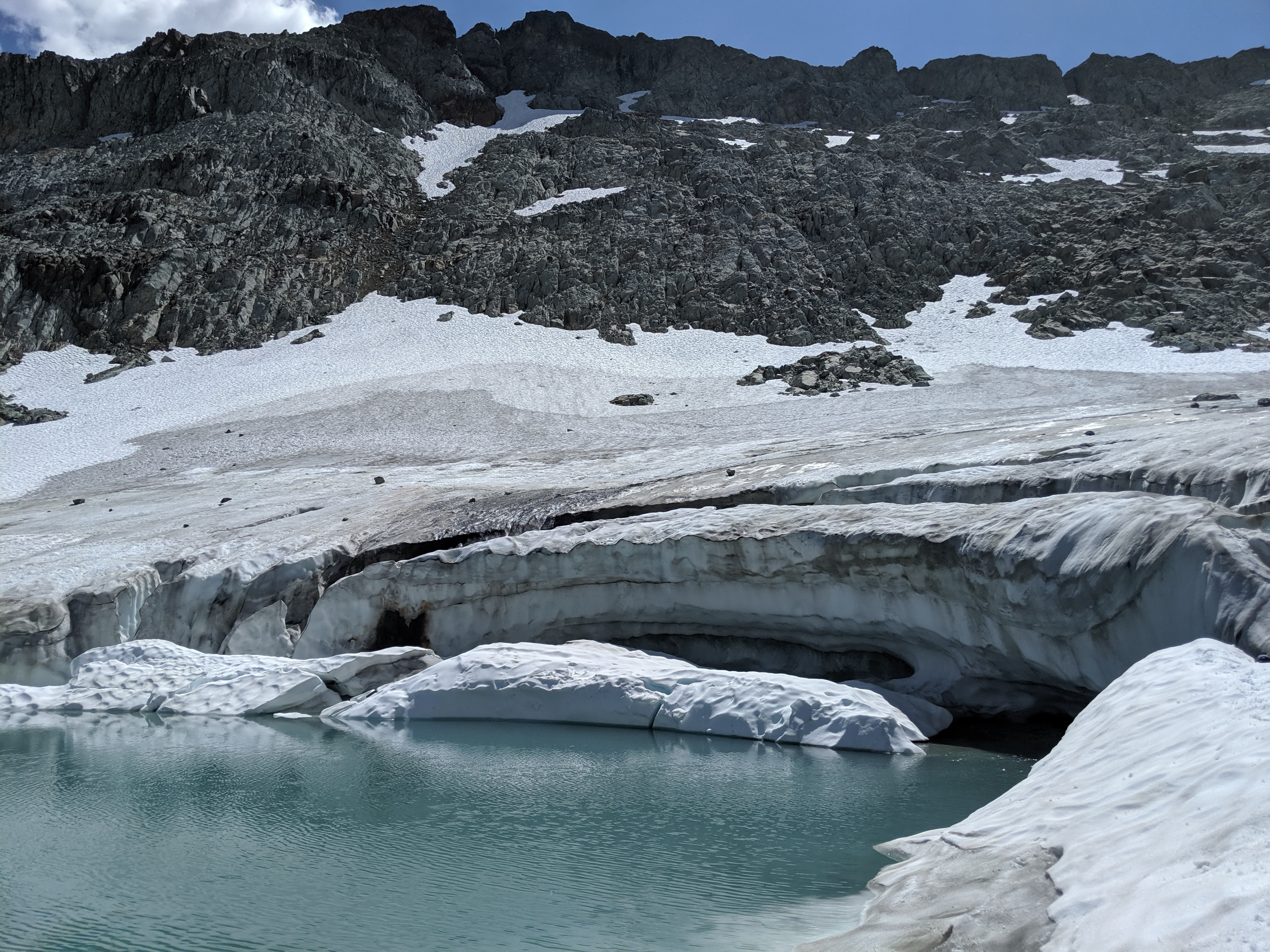
A newly formed (ca 2015) alpine lake on the terminus of the Ice Worm glacier on Mt. Daniel in Washington, USA resulting from glacier recession.

Glacial alpine lakes differ from other glacier-formed lakes in that they occur at higher altitudes and mountainous terrain usually at or above timberline. For example, the Great Lakes of the U.S. and Canada are formed by the retreat of the Laurentide Ice Sheet during the last Ice Age which scoured the flat rock surface but are not in the alpine. Conversely, Lake Louise located in the Rocky Mountains was formed from glacial debris damming meltwater (i.e., a moraine lake) from the Victoria Glacier.

=== Stratification ===
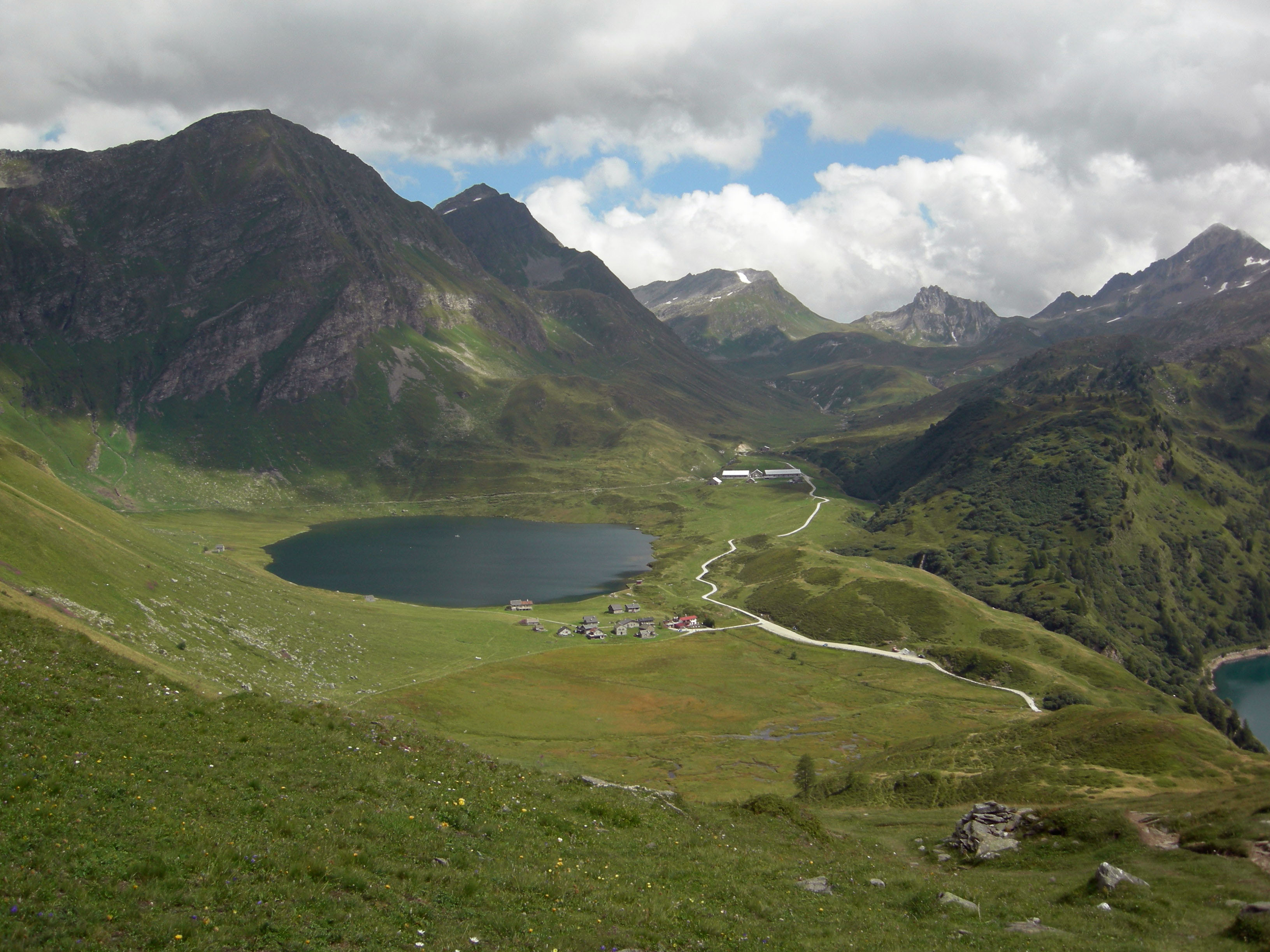
Lake Cadagno in the Swiss Alps is a naturally meromictic alpine lake due to saline input from groundwater.

The annual cycle of stratification and mixing in lakes plays a significant role in determining vertical distribution of heat, dissolved chemicals, and biological communities. Most alpine lakes exist in temperate or cold climates characteristic of their high elevation, leading to a dimictic mixing regime. Dimictic lakes fully mix twice a year between periods of vertical stratification in the summer and winter. Summer stratification is caused by heating of surface waters, and winter stratification is caused by cooling of surface waters below the freshwater temperature of maximum density (approximately 4 °C (39 °F)). Seasonal ice cover reinforces the dimictic stratification cycle of alpine lakes by insulating the lake from wind and warm air in the spring when stratification is generally weaker. Some shallow alpine lakes can become fully mixed multiple times per year through episodic wind or cold inflow events and are therefore considered cold polymictic. A number of meromictic alpine lakes (in which a deep layer of the lake never mixes with surface water) exist. Lake Cadagno, located in the Swiss Alps, is meromictic due to natural springs which constantly feed the bottom of the lake with dense, saline water. Other alpine lakes, such as Traunsee in Austria, have become meromictic due to salinization from anthropogenic activities such as mining.

Recent studies suggest that climate change may impact the annual cycles of stratification in alpine lakes. High altitude regions are experiencing changing seasonal weather patterns and faster warming than the global average. The duration of ice cover on alpine lakes is sensitive to these factors, and shorter ice cover duration has the potential to shift the mixing regime of lakes from dimictic to monomictic (one stratified and one fully mixed period each year). A change in mixing regime could fundamentally alter chemical and biological conditions such as nutrient availability and the timing and duration of hypoxia in alpine lakes. In addition, the relatively small size and high altitude of alpine lakes may make them especially susceptible to changes in climate.

=== Hydrology ===
The hydrology of an alpine lake's watershed plays a large role in determining chemical characteristics and nutrient availability. Sources of water inflow into alpine lakes include precipitation, melting snow and glaciers, and groundwater. Alpine lake inflow often has a large seasonal cycle due to precipitation falling as snow and low glacier melt over the watershed in the winter contrasted with rainfall and increased glacier melt in summer. Alpine lakes are often situated in mountainous regions near or above the treeline which leads to steep watersheds with underdeveloped soil and sparse vegetation. A combination of cold climate over alpine watersheds, shading from steep topography, and low nutrient concentrations in runoff make alpine lakes predominantly oligotrophic.

Different watershed characteristics create a distinction between clear alpine lakes and glacier-fed alpine lakes (lakes with inflow from melting glaciers). Clear alpine lakes have low concentrations of suspended sediment and turbidity which can be caused by a lack of erosion in the watershed. Glacier-fed lakes have much higher suspended sediment concentrations and turbidity due to inflow of glacial flour, resulting in opaqueness and a bright blue or brown color. The turbidity of alpine lakes plays a significant role in determining light availability for primary productivity and is heavily dependent on each lake's unique watershed.

=== Circulation ===
Circulation in alpine lakes can be caused by wind, river inflows, density currents, convection, and basin-scale waves. Steep topography characteristic of alpine lakes can partially shield them from wind generated by regional weather patterns. Therefore, smaller scale wind patterns generated by local topography, such as diurnal mountain breeze and katabatic wind, can be important in forcing circulation in alpine lakes. Wind patterns which vary spatially over the extent of the lake may create regions of upwelling and downwelling. River inflow can induce circulation in alpine lakes through momentum carried directly into the lake by rivers or streams and through density currents. If the inflowing water is denser than the water at the surface of the lake (due to differences in temperature or sediment concentration), buoyancy drives the heavier inflowing water down the slope of the lake bed or into the lake interior. Such density-driven flows have been recorded in alpine lakes with velocities reaching nearly 1 m/s. Heating and cooling of alpine lakes can cause surface waters to become more dense than the water in the interior of the lake. This results in a gravitationally unstable water column, and the dense water is pulled downward from the surface causing convection. This vertical circulation is an efficient means for mixing in lakes and may play a significant role in homogenizing the water column between periods of stratification. Basin-scale waves, such as internal waves and seiches, can also drive circulation in alpine lakes. Internal seiches in an alpine lake have been observed with attendant velocities on the order of a few centimeters per second.

== Ecology ==
=== Microbial community structure ===
Alpine lakes are home to a unique diversity of invertebrates that are highly adapted to the colder and generally harsher conditions of these environments compared to lakes at lower altitudes. A few dominating species have adapted to the oligotrophic conditions and intense UV radiation, with chironomidae and oligochaeta comprising almost 70% of the community in two well-studied alpine lakes in northern Italy, and also the two most prominent species (66% and 28%, respectively) in 28 alpine lakes in Austria. Phytoplankton populations are dominated by nanoplanktonic, mobile species including chrysophytes, dinoflagellates, and cryptophytes in the water column, with important contributions to photosynthesis also coming from the algae community attached to substrates, epilithon and epipelon. Viruses are also observed in alpine lakes at abundances of up to 3 × 10^{7}/mL, which nears the upper range of the general observed abundances from 10^{5} to 10^{8}/mL in aquatic systems.

A study of 28 alpine lakes found that with increasing elevation, macroinvertebrate abundances increase in small lakes but decrease in larger lakes and community composition shifts with increasing elevation, towards a small number of specialized species. The increasing abundances in smaller lakes as elevation increases are thought to be due to the more extreme temperature regimes characteristic of smaller bodies of water, selecting for a small subset of more robust species that end up thriving from less overall competition. Altitude may also affect community composition due to the change in availability of food resources. For example, at higher altitudes, alpine lakes experience shorter ice-free periods which places a limit on the amount of primary production and subsequent growth of food. In conclusion, both the lake's physical features, including size and substrate, and environmental parameters, including temperature and ice-cover, define community composition and structure, with one study suggesting that temperature and altitude are the primary drivers, and another presenting evidence instead for heterogeneity in lake morphometry and substrate as the primary drivers. The latter, in particular an increase in rocky substratum, was found to negatively impact abundance and species richness. All of these environmental parameters are likely to be impacted by climate change, with cascading effects on alpine lake invertebrate and microbial communities.

=== Vertebrate community structure ===
The vertebrate community of alpine lakes is much more limited than invertebrate communities as harsh conditions have an increased impact on the organisms, but can include fish, amphibians, reptiles, and birds. Despite this, many alpine lakes can still host diverse species at these high elevations. These organisms have arrived in several ways through human introductions, ecological introductions, and some are endemic to their respective lakes. The Titicaca water frog in Lake Titicaca in the high Andes is one species that is endemic, while others were introduced.

Lake Titicaca is home to a wide variety of vertebrates, including the Titicaca water frog (Telmatobious culeous), and the endangered Titicaca grebe (Rollandia microptera) found only in the Titicaca basin. The basin is also home to a variety of bird species and is considered a Ramsar Site due to its ecological importance. Waterbird species include Chilean flamingo, greater yellowlegs, snowy egret, Andean coot, Andean gull, and the Andean lapwing.

Another important alpine lake, Crater Lake located in Oregon, is home to several introduced fish species, native amphibians, and reptiles. The amphibians and reptiles that can be found in Crater Lake are the mazama newt, northwestern salamander, northwestern ribbed frog, northwestern toad, cascade frog, pacific tree frog, northern mountain lizard, pigmy horned toad, northern alligator lizard, and northwestern garter snake.

=== Introduced species ===
Some alpine lakes do not hold any native vertebrate species and instead have grown their vertebrate communities through introduced species. Fish are commonly introduced by humans stocking lakes for recreational and competitive fishing.

Crater Lake did not hold any vertebrate species before a stocking event between 1884 and 1941 of 1.8 million salmonids, mainly Rainbow trout (Oncorhynchus mykiss) and kokanee salmon (O. nerka). Other species introduced included brown trout (Salmo trutta), coho salmon (O. kisutch), cutthroat trout (O. clarkii), and steelhead salmon (O. mykiss). Introduced fish impact the limnetic and benthic communities, as they are the primary prey of non-native fish. Salamanders and newts found at Crater Lake also experienced encroachment on their native habitats and have been reduced or eliminated in numbers. These amphibians were also found in the stomach contents of fish stocked in Crater Lake, which has further reduced populations.

Lake Tahoe, located between California and Nevada, also has several introduced fish species established in the basin due to recreational fishing, including lake trout (Salvelinus namaycush), rainbow trout, brown trout, bluegill (Lepomis macrochirus), carp (Cyprinus caprio), and others. Lake trout, along with an introduced freshwater shrimp, Mysis relicta, have drastically changed the food web in Lake Tahoe. Nearby Cascade Lake in California, which is often closely studied with Lake Tahoe, does not have any introduced species due to highly restricted public access. Fish were also stocked in Lake Titicaca following the decimation of a native fish population after a fishing competition.

Some studies have noted that recreational fishing of introduced species in alpine lakes may have negative effects on the overall ecosystem. Bringing in non-native species, especially to fishless lakes, can also carry pathogens and bacteria, negatively impacting the invertebrate community already there. Studies of two fishless Italian alpine lakes, Dimon Lake and Balma Lake, found that introduced fish brought new viruses and bacteria that were harmful to the native amphibians in the water. The studies also showed that the only way to fix the problem is to completely eradicate the non-native fish species in the lakes in any way possible. These included using gill nets, electrofishing, and continued aggressive recreational fishing.

=== Climate change impacts ===
Alpine lake invertebrates are arguably one of the most vulnerable communities of invertebrates to increasing temperatures associated with human-induced climate change, due to the expected increase in ice-free periods and to the relatively small impact of human-changed land cover that other similar terrestrial-aquatic systems have already been subjected to. Cold-stenothermal species uniquely adapted to survive in only a small range of cold temperatures, and larger sexual reproducing species slower to reproduce than smaller, asexual species under perturbations, could both be negatively impacted. Melting glaciers are presumed to increase the sizes of the alpine lakes that are glacier-fed, impacting the evidence size effect on community composition. Also, habitat structure could change in response to an increase in erosion from thawing permafrost, and lastly, an uptick in the frequency and magnitude of extreme weather events would increase water column turbidity, which is well-known to impact the processes of photosynthesis and respiration by increasing light attenuation and decreasing the size of the photic zone. Alpine lake ecosystems are undergoing unprecedented rates of change in community composition in relation to recent temperature increases and nutrient loading. Consistent monitoring can help identify, quantify and characterize this ecological impact.

One such monitoring technique employs macroinvertebrates as bioindicators primarily to analyze the accumulation of trace elements associated with pollution and to, more generally, track changes in biological communities due to climate change. Trace elements can occur naturally, but industrialization, including the consumption of fossil fuels, has accelerated their rate of accumulation into alpine lake environments. Though essential to life in low concentrations, some trace elements begin to function as contaminants with over-accumulation. After being released into the atmosphere, trace elements can become soluble through biogeochemical processes and end up in sediment and then mobilized through weathering and runoff to enter alpine lake ecosystems. Benthic macroinvertebrates often at the base of food webs, are the primary accumulators of trace elements, which are then transferred up the food chain to fish or birds via predation. The seminal study that used chironomids as bioindicators due to their abundance in alpine lakes and variety of feeding habits (collectors, shredders, and predators) found that most trace element concentrations are within limits of sediment quality targets, with the exception of lead in both study lakes and zinc in one, and also concluded that trace element concentrations reflected the relative levels of pollution impacting each alpine lake in the study region of northern Italy. Another study, upon assessing the composition through time of chosen bioindicators and finding evidence for degraded water quality, concluded that the lake ecosystem had moved out of a "safe operational state".

== Alkalinity and pH ==
Alkalinity can be defined as the acid neutralizing capability of a body of water. Alkalinity in natural waters is largely due to bicarbonate, the strong conjugate base of the weak carbonic acid, that is the product of rock weathering. Bicarbonate has the ability to act as an acid or a base in water, making it a buffer to resist change from acidic or basic inputs into a body of water. Alkalinity is measured in the unit μeq L^{−1} which is determined by the concentration of an ion per liter of water multiplied by the charge of the ion or by titration.

Alpine lakes have been well studied in regard to acidification since the 1980s largely because of the seasonal patterns of alkalinity and pH changes that they naturally exhibit from precipitation and snowmelt. These lakes experience seasonally low alkalinity (and thus low pH), making them highly susceptible to acid precipitation as a result of atmospheric pollutants. The water chemistry of alpine lakes is dominated by atmospheric deposition (transport of particles between the atmosphere) and catchment processes (drainage of precipitation). The weather patterns of alpine lakes include large periods of snowmelt which has extended contact with soil and rock resulting in increased alkalinity. Weathering of rocks that are calcareous or carbonate based (limestone) are the major contributors of alkalinity to alpine lakes whereas alpine lakes in regions of granite and other igneous rocks have lower alkalinity due to slower kinetics of the weathering. Lower alkalinity indicates a lower ability to buffer the water from acidic or basic inputs so alpine lakes with low alkalinity are susceptible to acidic pollutants in the atmosphere. It is generally accepted that alpine lakes with alkalinity less than 200 unit μeq L^{−1} are susceptible to acidification.

=== European Alps ===
The Alps are the largest mountain range in Europe and home to some of the most well-known lakes. The bedrock in the Alps varies greatly and can be composed of granite, quartz, slate, dolomite, marble, limestone and much more. This diverse geological structure plays a role in the diverse alkalinity of each alpine lake. A study of 73 alpine lakes in the Eastern Alps determined that 85% of the lakes had low alkalinity values (< 200 μeq L^{−1}) with only two lakes having an alkalinity above 500 μeq L^{−1}. This study also determined pH and found a range from 7.93–4.80 with 21% of the lakes having a pH below 6.00. The pH in this region was also found to be independent of altitude.

A similar analysis was done on 207 lakes, resulting in an alkalinity range from -23 to 1372 μeq L^{−1} and an average of 145 μeq L^{−1}. The pH was also determined for these lakes, ranging from 4.6 to 9.2. Alpine lakes with a pH less than 6.0 had shown acidic effects on micro-organisms and a pH less than 5.3 was characterized as having reached severe acidification. This analysis was repeated on 107 alpine lakes in the Central Alps with bedrock of silicic and ultrabasic rocks. These lakes had an alkalinity range from 155 to -23 microequiavlents per liter, suggesting how sensitive alpine lakes with similar bedrock might be to acidic rain.

=== Cascade Range ===
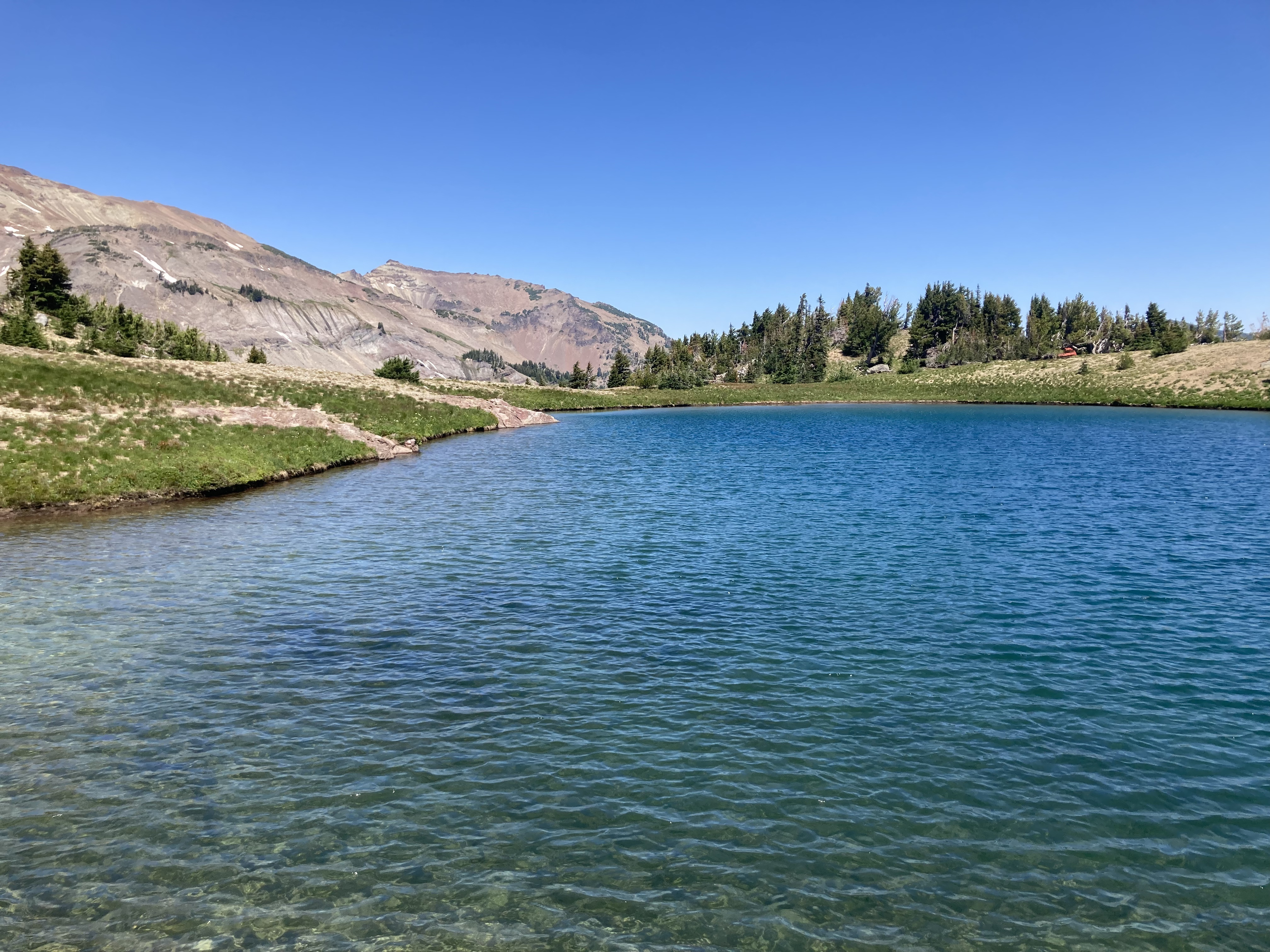
Alpine Lake in Goat Rocks Wilderness

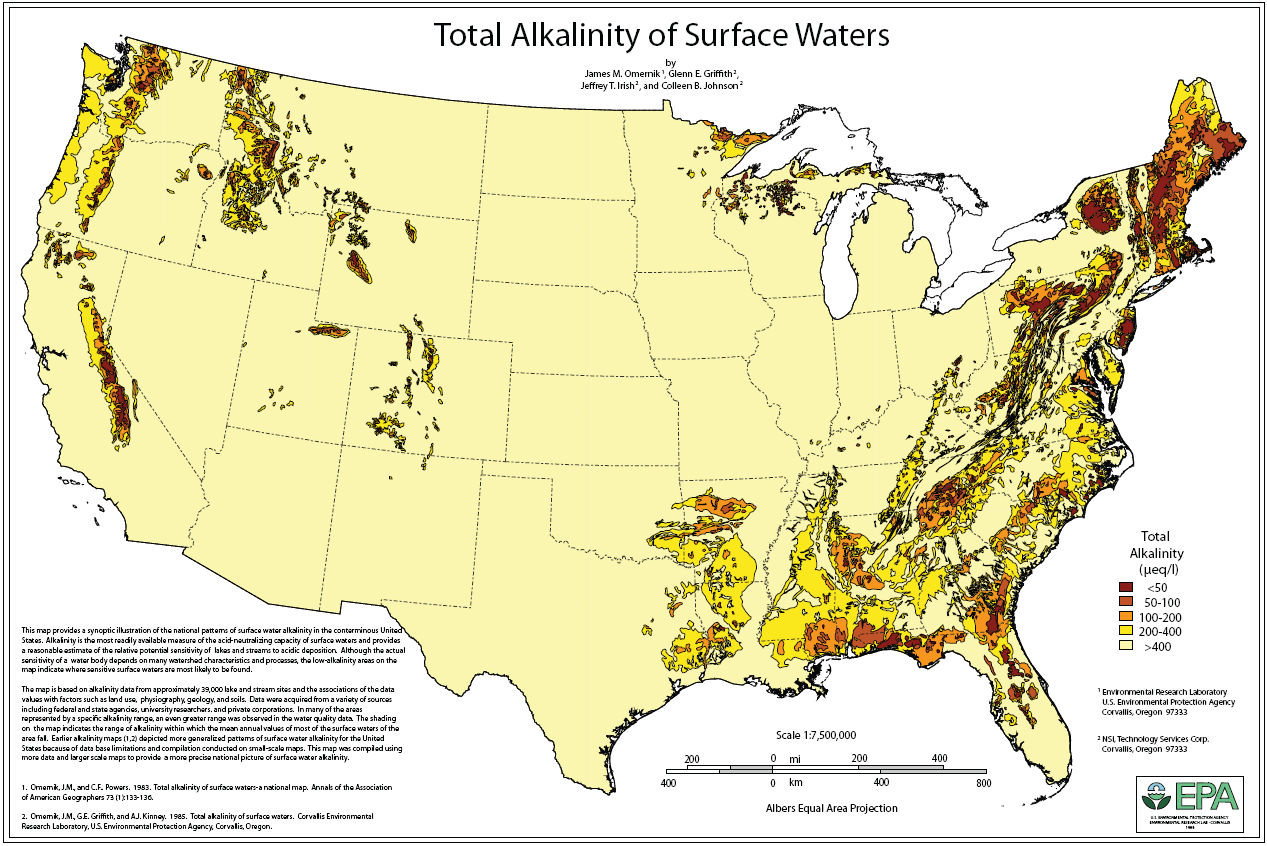
Total Alkalinity of Surface Waters in the United States. The Cascade region is the mountain region covering Washington, Oregon and Northern California.

The Cascade Mountain Range extends from Northern California through Oregon and Washington. This region is composed of sedimentary and volcanic rocks, has heavy seasonal precipitation, and coniferous forests. The Alpine Lakes Wilderness Area in the Washington Cascades has over 700 lakes. Alkalinity for lakes in the Cascade region vary from as high as 400 μeq L-1 to as low as 57 μeq L^{−1}, all of which are considered to be low alkalinity, and suggestive that they might be susceptible to acidification. The pH of these lakes ranged from 7.83 to 5.62, and in this region an acidified lake is considered having a pH below 4.7. The Cascade Range was further evaluated by subregions since the environments vary greatly. Lower alkalinity, 50–100 μeq L^{−1}, was observed in regions with little soil and granite rocks, like that of Glacier Peak Wilderness and Mt. Rainier. Higher alkalinity, 200–400 μeq L^{−1}, was observed in regions composed of basalt and andesite such as the Western Cascades.

== Palaeoclimatological data ==
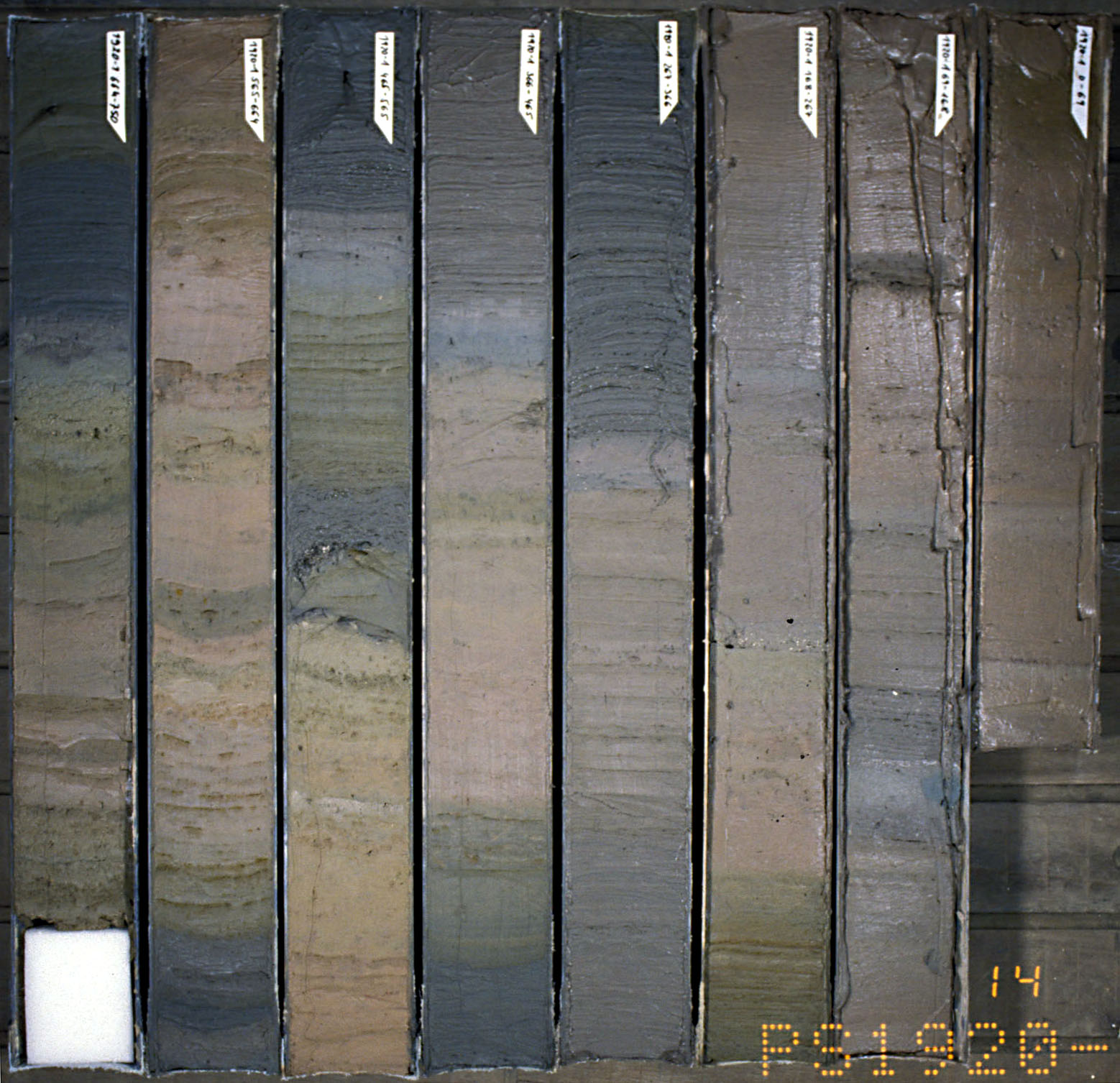
Example of layering in a sediment core.

Paleoproxies are chemical or biological sources that serve as indicator data for some aspect of the climate and can help reconstruct past regional climates and the future fate of alpine environments. Alpine lakes themselves are unique reservoirs of paleoclimate data, particularly for understanding climate in the late Quaternary, as they collect and store geomorphological and ecological data in their sediment. These records of the past allow for a better understanding of how alpine lakes have responded to climate variability. Thus, by understanding these mechanisms of the past, better predictions can be made about the future response of alpine ecosystems to present-day climate change.

The fraction of mineral phosphorus (P) to organic P within lake sediments can be used to determine if the sediment deposits are sourced from glaciers (higher mineral to organic P ratio) or debris slopes (lower mineral to organic P ratio). Therefore, the sediment P content can inform glacial activity and thus climate at the time the sediment was deposited. For instance, an alpine lake in the Coast Mountains of British Columbia revealed cooler and wetter conditions due to the increased trend in mineral-rich (glacial-derived) P sediments which agrees with other findings of cooling in the Holocene.

Magnetic properties of the sediment in alpine lakes can also help infer glacial activity at a high resolution. When the magnetic properties of the lake sediments match those of the bedrock, it can be deduced that there was more glacier movement, i.e., cooler temperatures. Along with the sediments being "detrital" (bedrock weathering), the sediments are more coarse-grained indicating high glacial activity associated with the Pleistocene.

Diatom assemblages reveal changes in benthic conditions and alkalinity which help infer changes in temperature and carbon dioxide concentrations over time. During periods of warmer temperatures, extended growing seasons led to more benthic plant growth which is revealed by more periphytic (substrate-growing) diatom species. After the onset of the Industrial Revolution, diatom assemblages revealed more acidic conditions which are associated with higher carbon dioxide concentrations. Aside from the alpine lakes themselves serving as a source of paleoclimate observations, the surrounding alpine zone also contributes many useful proxies such as tree ring dynamics and geomorphological features.
