= Timpa Lake =

Alpine lake in the state of Idaho

- Location within Idaho Location within the United States
- Location: Elmore County, Idaho
- Coordinates: 43°55′31″N 115°03′13″W
- Type: Glacial
- Primary outflows: Timpa Creek to Middle Fork Boise River
- Basin countries: United States
- Max. length: 0.10 mi (0.16 km)
- Max. width: 0.10 mi (0.16 km)
- Surface elevation: 7,925 ft (2,416 m)

Timpa Lake is a small alpine lake in Elmore County, Idaho, United States, located in the Sawtooth Mountains in the Sawtooth National Recreation Area. The lake is accessed from Sawtooth National Forest trail 479 along Timpa Creek Creek.

Timpa Lake is in the Sawtooth Wilderness, and a wilderness permit can be obtained at a registration box at trailheads or wilderness boundaries. It is downstream of Chickadee Lake, Surprise Lake, Confusion Lake, and Low Pass Lake.

== See also ==
- List of lakes of the Sawtooth Mountains (Idaho)
- Sawtooth National Forest
- Sawtooth National Recreation Area
- Sawtooth Range (Idaho)
