= Three Island Lake =

Alpine lake in the state of Idaho

- Location within Idaho Location within the United States
- Location: Boise County, Idaho
- Coordinates: 43°57′02″N 115°03′44″W
- Type: Glacial
- Primary outflows: Benedict Creek to South Fork Payette River
- Basin countries: United States
- Max. length: 0.22 mi (0.35 km)
- Max. width: 0.13 mi (0.21 km)
- Surface elevation: 8,615 ft (2,626 m)
- Islands: 3

Three Island Lake is a small alpine lake in Boise County, Idaho, United States, located in the Sawtooth Mountains in the Sawtooth National Recreation Area. The lake is accessed from Sawtooth National Forest trail 462.

Three Island Lake is in the Sawtooth Wilderness, and a wilderness permit can only be obtained at a registration box at trailheads or wilderness boundaries. Benedict Lake is downstream of Three Island Lake while Low Pass Lake is just over the pass to the southeast.

== See also ==
- List of lakes of the Sawtooth Mountains (Idaho)
- Sawtooth National Forest
- Sawtooth National Recreation Area
- Sawtooth Range (Idaho)
