= Benedict Lake =

Alpine lake in the state of Idaho

- Location within Idaho Location within the United States
- Location: Boise County, Idaho
- Coordinates: 43.963989°N 115.058989°W
- Lake type: Glacial
- Primary inflows: Benedict Creek
- Primary outflows: Benedict Creek to South Fork Payette River
- Basin countries: United States
- Max. length: 0.17 mi (0.27 km)
- Max. width: 0.09 mi (0.14 km)
- Surface elevation: 8,270 ft (2,520 m)

Benedict Lake is a small alpine lake in Boise County, Idaho, United States, located in the Sawtooth Mountains in the Sawtooth National Recreation Area. The lake is accessed from Sawtooth National Forest trail 462.

Benedict Lake is in the Sawtooth Wilderness, and a wilderness permit can be obtained at a registration box at trailheads or wilderness boundaries. Rock Slide Lake and Three Island Lake are upstream of Benedict Lake.

== See also ==
- List of lakes of the Sawtooth Mountains (Idaho)
- Sawtooth National Forest
- Sawtooth National Recreation Area
- Sawtooth Range (Idaho)
