= Surprise Lake (Idaho) =

Small lake in Elmore County, Idaho

- Location within Idaho Location within the United States
- Location: Elmore County, Idaho
- Coordinates: 43°56′08″N 115°03′21″W
- Type: Glacial
- Primary outflows: Timpa Creek to Middle Fork Boise River
- Basin countries: United States
- Max. length: 0.16 mi (0.26 km)
- Max. width: 0.10 mi (0.16 km)
- Surface elevation: 8,595 ft (2,620 m)

Surprise Lake is a small alpine lake in Elmore County, Idaho, United States, located in the Sawtooth Mountains in the Sawtooth National Recreation Area. The lake is accessed from Sawtooth National Forest trail 479 along Timpa Creek Creek.

Surprise Lake is in the Sawtooth Wilderness, and a wilderness permit can be obtained at a registration box at trailheads or wilderness boundaries. Timpa Lake is downstream of Surprise Lake, while Chickadee Lake is upstream to the southwest and Confusion Lake is upstream to the northeast.

== See also ==
- List of lakes of the Sawtooth Mountains (Idaho)
- Sawtooth National Forest
- Sawtooth National Recreation Area
- Sawtooth Range (Idaho)
