= Chickadee Lake =

Alpine lake in the state of Idaho

- Location within Idaho Location within the United States
- Location: Elmore County, Idaho
- Coordinates: 43°55′52″N 115°03′35″W
- Lake type: Glacial
- Primary outflows: Timpa Creek to Middle Fork Boise River
- Basin countries: United States
- Max. length: 0.12 mi (0.19 km)
- Max. width: 0.05 mi (0.080 km)
- Surface elevation: 8,715 ft (2,656 m)

Chickadee Lake is a small alpine lake in Elmore County, Idaho, United States, located in the Sawtooth Mountains in the Sawtooth National Recreation Area. It is accessed from Sawtooth National Forest trail 479 along Timpa Creek.

It is in the Sawtooth Wilderness, and a wilderness permit can be obtained at a registration box at trailheads or wilderness boundaries. Timpa Lake is upstream of Surprise Lake and Confusion Lake.

== See also ==
- List of lakes of the Sawtooth Mountains (Idaho)
- Sawtooth National Forest
- Sawtooth National Recreation Area
- Sawtooth Range (Idaho)
