= Low pass =

Low Pass may refer to

- Low Pass, Oregon
- Low-pass filter
- Low Pass in Mountain passes in Montana
- Low Pass Lake, in Elmore County, Idaho, United States
- A flypast very close to the ground
