= Confusion Lake =

Alpine lake in Idaho, United States

- Location within Idaho Location within the United States
- Location: Elmore County, Idaho
- Coordinates: 43°56′21″N 115°03′12″W
- Type: Glacial
- Primary outflows: Timpa Creek to Middle Fork Boise River
- Basin countries: United States
- Max. length: 0.13 mi (0.21 km)
- Max. width: 0.08 mi (0.13 km)
- Surface elevation: 8,270 ft (2,520 m)

Confusion Lake is a small alpine lake in Elmore County, Idaho, United States, located in the Sawtooth Mountains in the Sawtooth National Recreation Area. The lake is accessed from Sawtooth National Forest trail 479 along Timpa Creek or 462 along the Middle Fork of the Boise River.

Confusion Lake is in the Sawtooth Wilderness, and a wilderness permit can be obtained at a registration box at trailheads or wilderness boundaries. Upstream of Confusion Lake is Low Pass Lake while Surprise Lake and Timpa Lake are downstream.

== See also ==
- List of lakes of the Sawtooth Mountains (Idaho)
- Sawtooth National Forest
- Sawtooth National Recreation Area
- Sawtooth Range (Idaho)
