= Spangle Lake =

Alpine lake in the state of Idaho

- Location within Idaho Location within the United States
- Location: Elmore County, Idaho
- Coordinates: 43°56′52″N 115°02′00″W
- Type: Glacial
- Primary outflows: Middle Fork Boise River
- Basin countries: United States
- Max. length: 0.32 mi (0.51 km)
- Max. width: 0.27 mi (0.43 km)
- Surface elevation: 8,585 ft (2,617 m)

Spangle Lake is a small alpine lake in Elmore County, Idaho, United States, located in the Sawtooth Mountains in the Sawtooth National Recreation Area. The lake is located at the intersection Sawtooth National Forest trails 462, 463, and 460.

Spangle Lake is in the Sawtooth Wilderness, and a wilderness permit can be obtained at a registration box at trailheads or wilderness boundaries. Little Spangle Lake is just downstream of Spangle Lake while Lake Ingeborg is just upstream. The Spangle lakes are the source of the Middle Fork Boise River.

== See also ==
- List of lakes of the Sawtooth Mountains (Idaho)
- Sawtooth National Forest
- Sawtooth National Recreation Area
- Sawtooth Range (Idaho)
