= Mount Heyburn =

Mountain in the state of Idaho

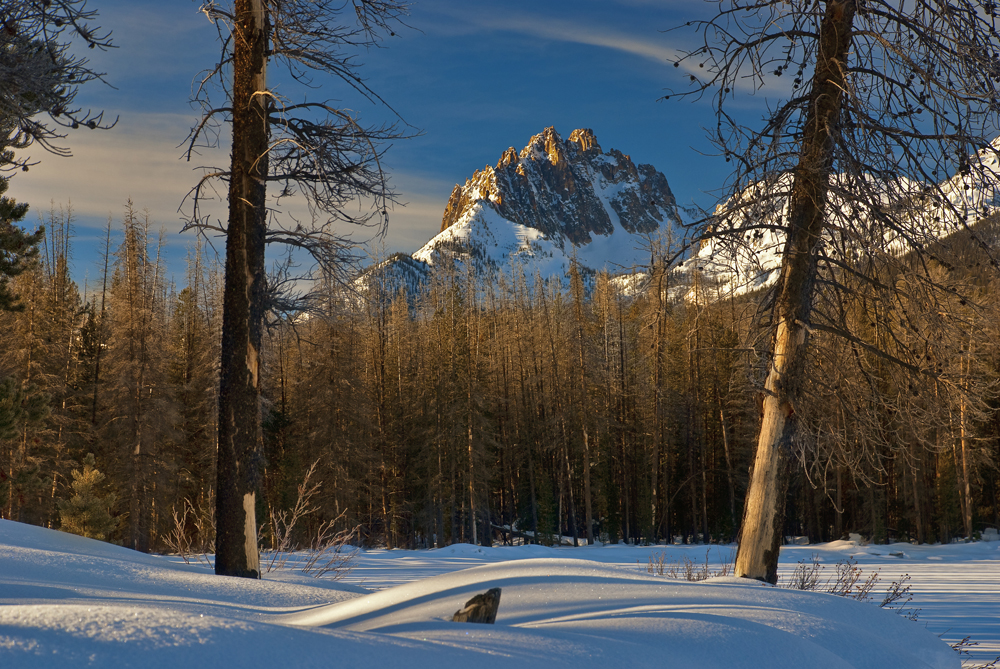
- Mount Heyburn

Highest point
- Elevation: 10,229 ft (3,118 m)
- Prominence: 561 ft (171 m)
- Parent peak: Mount Iowa
- Coordinates: 44°06′03.4″N 114°58′21.8″W

Geography
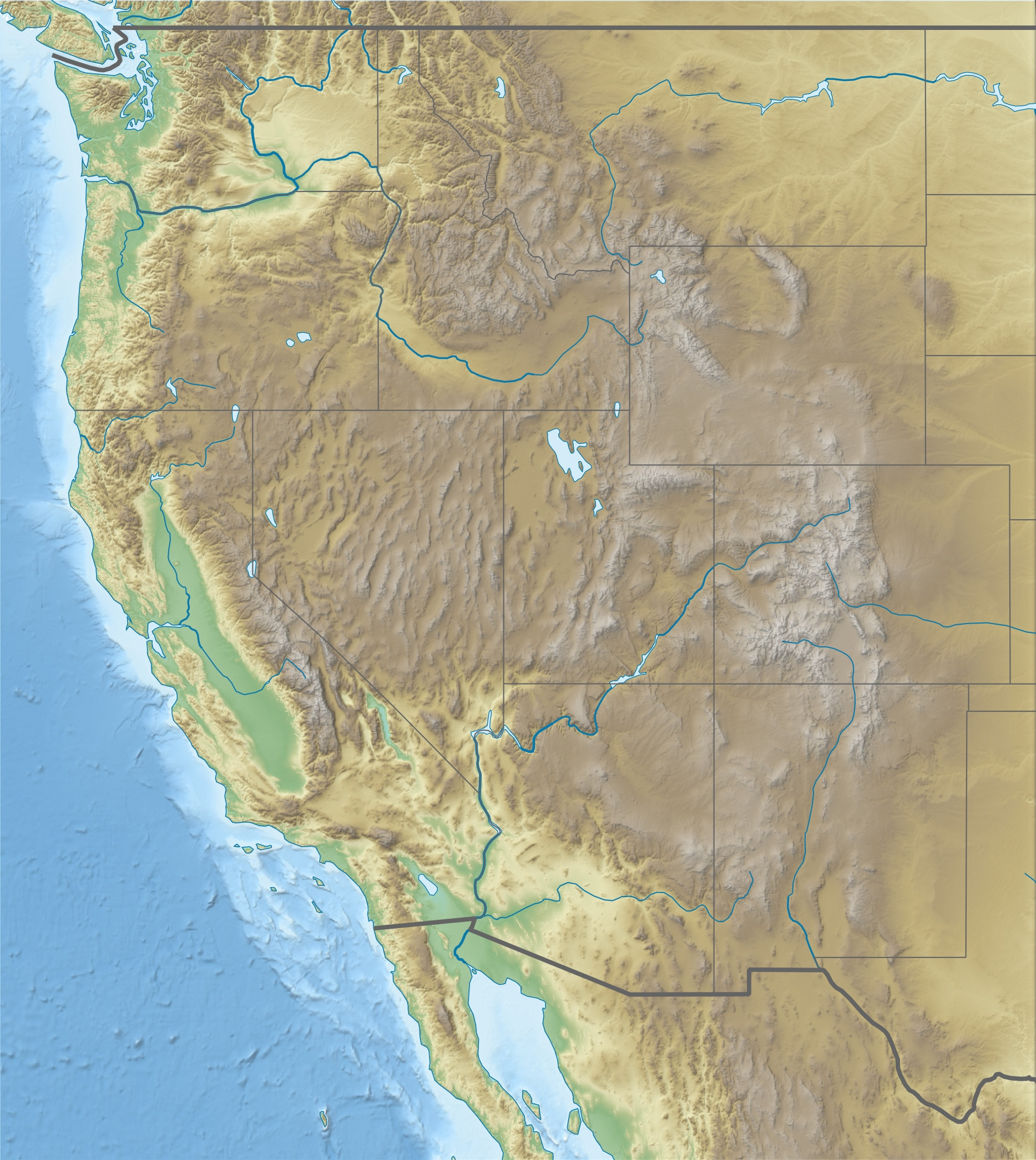
- Location within Idaho Location within USA West
- Location: Custer County, Idaho, U.S.
- Parent range: Sawtooth Range
- Topo map: USGS Mount Cramer

Climbing
- First ascent: 1935
- Easiest route: Class 5

Mount Heyburn, at 10,229 feet (3,118 m) is one of the many 10,000-foot (3,050 m) peaks in the Sawtooth Range of central Idaho. Mount Heyburn is located in Custer County and within the Sawtooth Wilderness portion of the Sawtooth National Recreation Area. The town of Stanley is located eight miles (13 km) north-northeast of Mount Heyburn. Grand Mogul, 9,733 ft (2,967 m), and Mount Heyburn are the two signature peaks that frame the southwest end of Redfish Lake (6,547 ft (1,996 m)); all are in the Salmon River watershed.

Redfish Lake and Little Redfish Lake and the visitor services at these locations are only a few miles north of Mount Heyburn. While there are no trails to the top of Mount Heyburn, there are trails around both sides of Redfish Lake, and a boat service that ferries hikers the five miles (8 km) from Redfish Lake Lodge on the north end of the lake to the south end at regular intervals, for a round trip fee of $22. The drop-off point at the south end is a campground at the base of Mount Heyburn. The best time to climb Mount Heyburn is in the summer (July, August, or September); all routes to up Mount Heyburn are class 5.

Mount Heyburn was named for Weldon Heyburn, a U.S. Senator from Idaho from 1903 until his death in 1912.

== Images ==
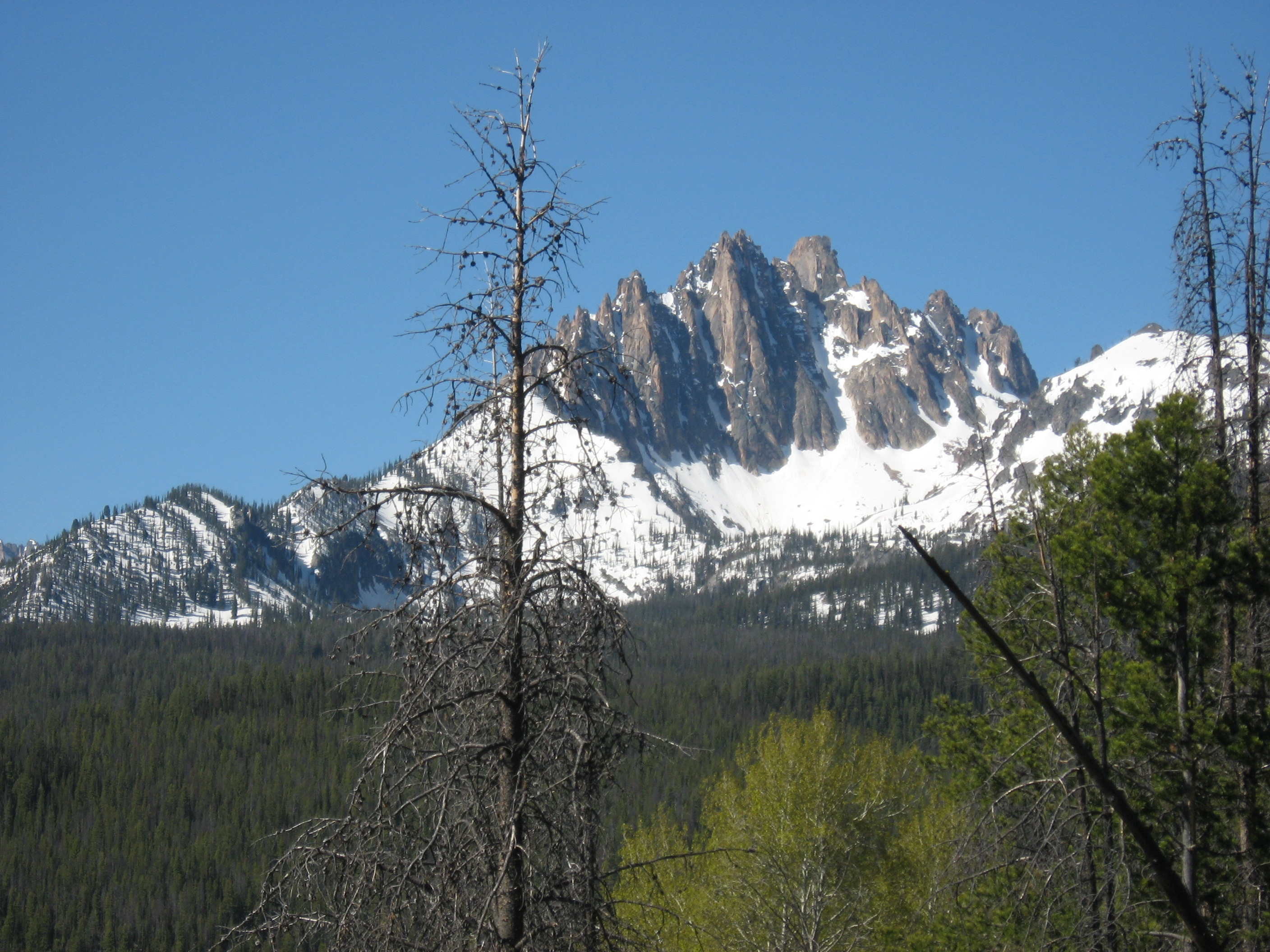
Mount Heyburn seen from Alpine Way Trail

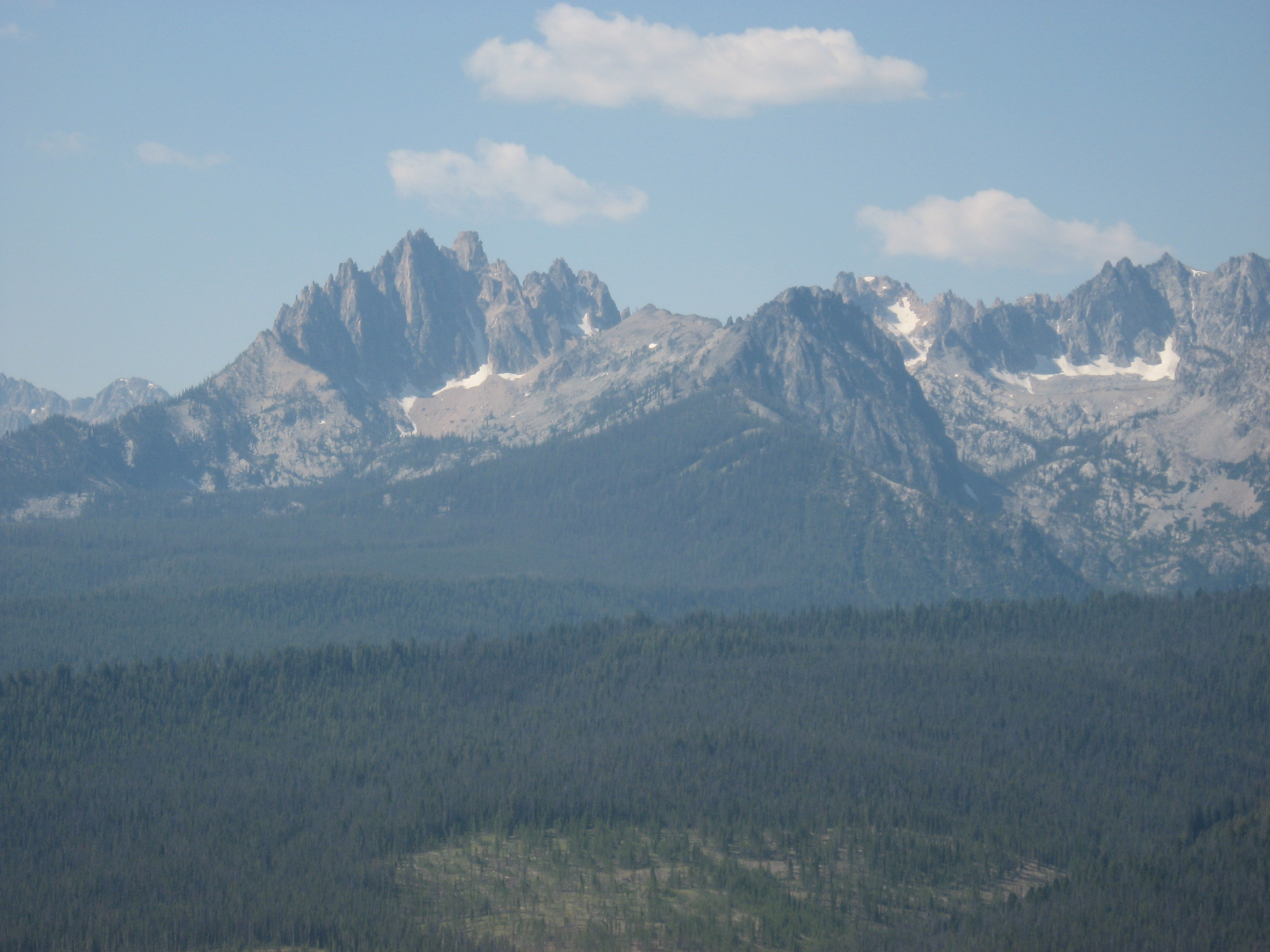
Mount Heyburn seen from ridge to southeast of Stanley

== See also ==
- List of peaks of the Sawtooth Range (Idaho)
- List of mountains of Idaho
- List of mountain peaks of Idaho
- List of mountain ranges in Idaho
