= Little Spangle Lake =

Alpine lake in the state of Idaho

- Location within Idaho Location within the United States
- Location: Elmore County, Idaho
- Coordinates: 43°56′37″N 115°01′52″W
- Type: Glacial
- Primary inflows: Middle Fork Boise River
- Primary outflows: Middle Fork Boise River
- Basin countries: United States
- Max. length: 0.24 mi (0.39 km)
- Max. width: 0.17 mi (0.27 km)
- Surface elevation: 8,590 ft (2,620 m)
- Islands: 3

Little Spangle Lake is a small alpine lake in Elmore County, Idaho, United States, located in the Sawtooth Mountains in the Sawtooth National Recreation Area. The lake located at the intersection of Sawtooth National Forest trails 460, 462, and 463 just downstream of Spangle Lake.

Spangle Lake is in the Sawtooth Wilderness, and a wilderness permit can be obtained at a registration box at trailheads or wilderness boundaries.

== See also ==
- List of lakes of the Sawtooth Mountains (Idaho)
- Sawtooth National Forest
- Sawtooth National Recreation Area
- Sawtooth Range (Idaho)
