= Grand Mogul =

Mountain in the state of Idaho

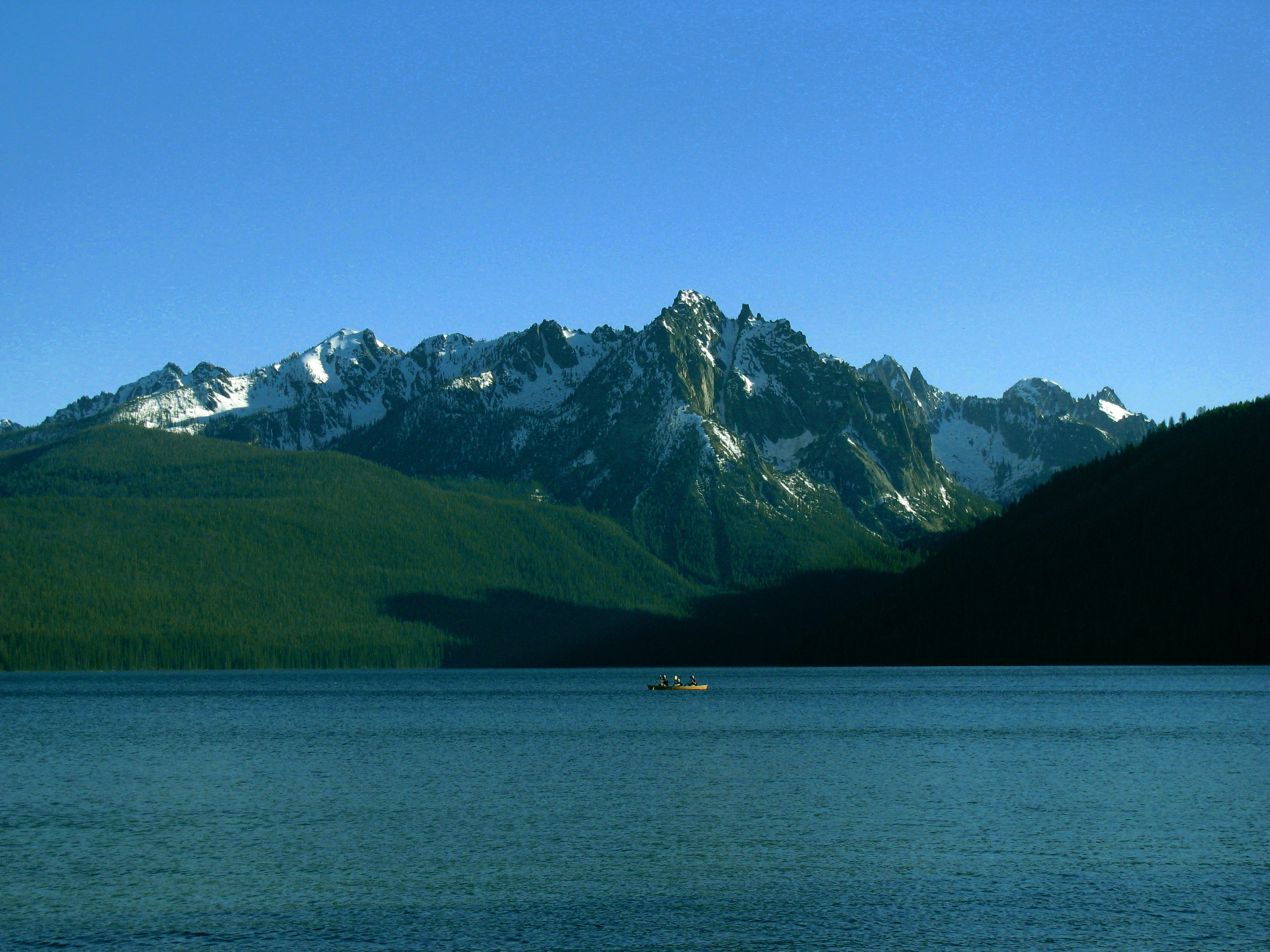
- Grand Mogul and Redfish Lake

Highest point
- Elevation: 9,733 ft (2,967 m)
- Prominence: 333 ft (101 m)
- Parent peak: Little Decker
- Coordinates: 44°04′48″N 114°57′35″W

Geography
- Location within Idaho
- Location: Custer County, Idaho, U.S.
- Parent range: Sawtooth Range
- Topo map: USGS Mount Cramer

Climbing
- Easiest route: Scrambling, class 3

The Grand Mogul, at 9,733 feet (2,967 m) above sea level is a peak in the Sawtooth Range of Idaho. The peak is located in the Sawtooth Wilderness of Sawtooth National Recreation Area in Custer County. The peak is located 0.95 mi (1.53 km) north-northwest of Little Decker, its line parent. The Grand Mogul is at the southwest end of Redfish Lake and 1.7 mi (2.7 km) southeast of Mount Heyburn.
