= Redfish Lake =

Alpine lake in the state of Idaho

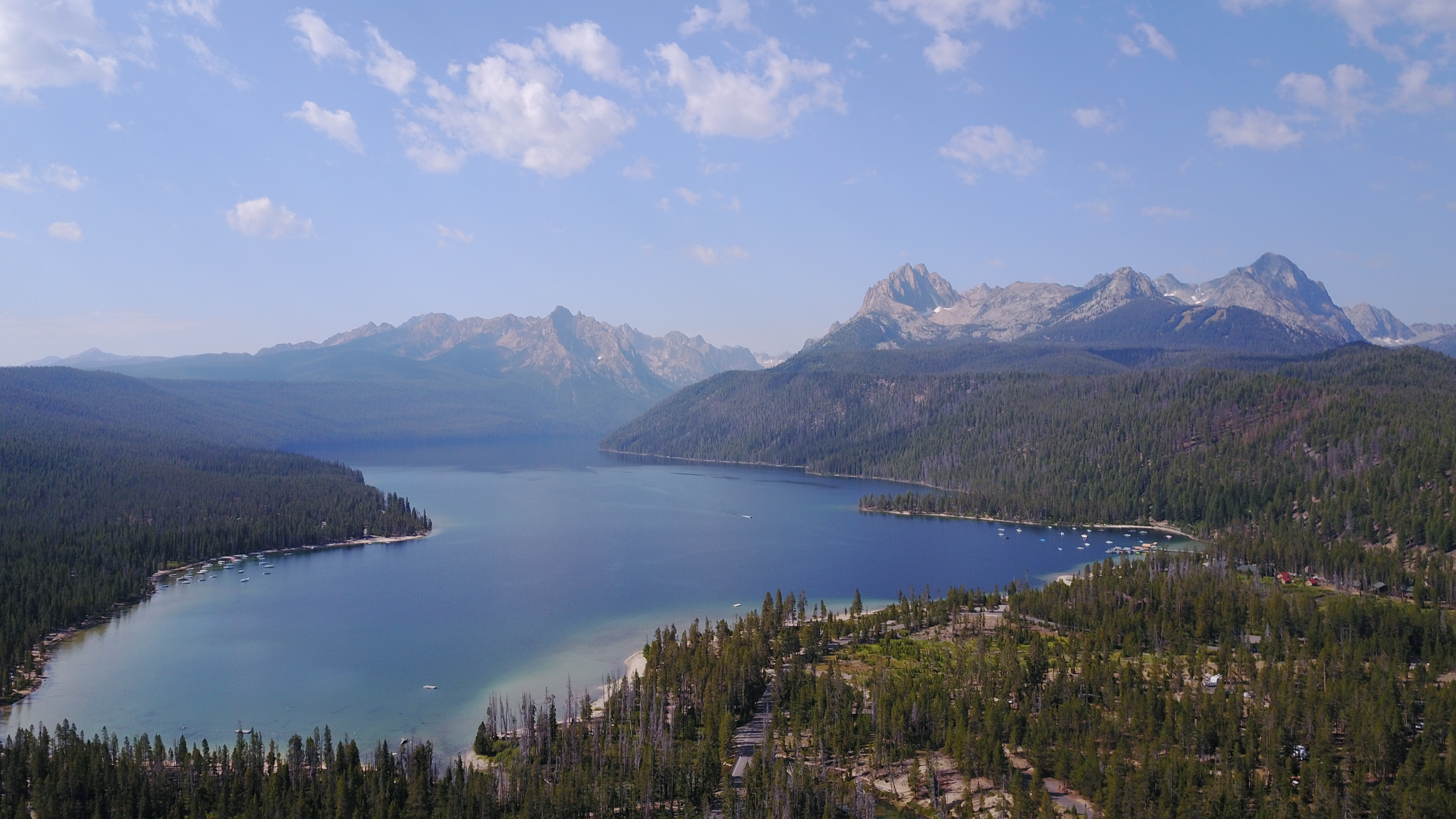
- Redfish Lake and the Sawtooth Range

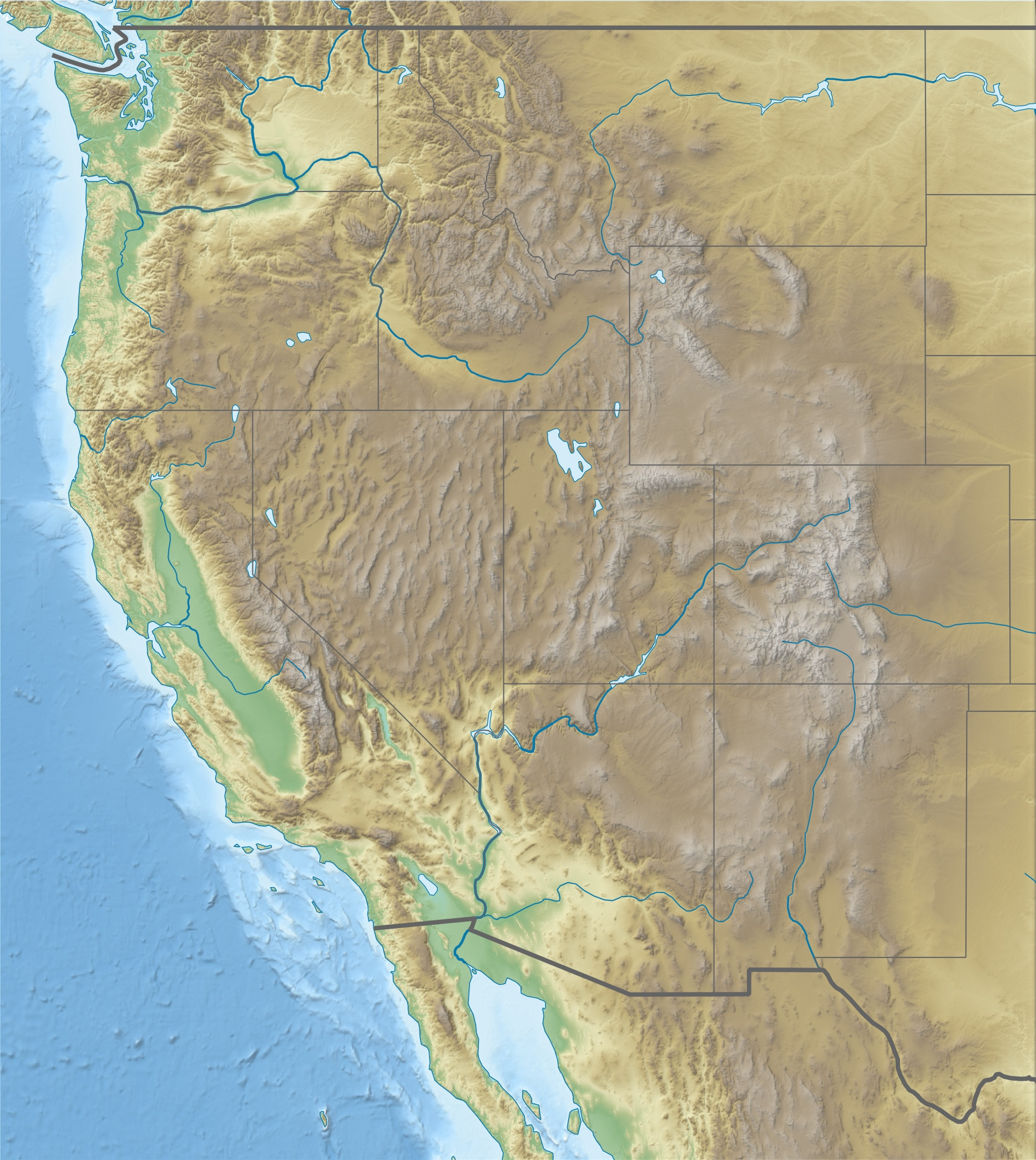
- Location within Idaho Location within USA West
- Location: Custer County, Idaho
- Coordinates: 44°7′N 114°56′W
- Type: Glacial
- Primary inflows: Redfish Lake Creek
- Primary outflows: Redfish Lake Creek to Salmon River
- Basin countries: United States
- Max. length: 4.5 mi (7.2 km)
- Max. width: .72 mi (1.16 km)
- Max. depth: 387 ft (118 m)
- Shore length^{1}: 11 mi (18 km)
- Surface elevation: 6,547 ft (1,996 m)
- ^{1} Shore length is not a well-defined measure.

Redfish Lake is an alpine lake in Custer County, Idaho, just south of Stanley. It is the largest lake within the Sawtooth National Recreation Area.

The U.S. Forest Service has developed some facilities for hiking, camping, and water sports on Redfish Lake while largely maintaining the natural landscape of the Sawtooth Mountains. On the north shore sits a seasonal hotel and marina, Redfish Lake Lodge, which offers a cross-lake ferry service for hikers and sightseers in the summer.

== Toponym ==
The lake is named for the brilliant sockeye salmon that once returned from the Pacific Ocean in such massive quantities that the lake shimmered red during spawning season. Currently, only a small percentage of the wild sockeye succeed in making through the several hydroelectric dams along their route back to the lake to spawn. Sockeye must not be targeted while fishing and must immediately be released if they are caught.

== Geography ==
The surface elevation of Redfish Lake is 6,547 feet (1,996 m) above sea level. The lake is 4.5 miles (7.2 km) long and 0.72 miles (1.2 km) wide, with a maximum depth of 387 feet (118 m), and 11 miles (18 km) of shoreline. The actual trail around the lake is 17.5 miles (28 km) in length.

The average temperature of the lake ranges from freezing (32 °F (0 °C)) to a high of around 62 °F (17 °C) in late July & early August. The lake freezes over in winter, with ice thickness of 30–36 inches (75–90 cm).

The peaks which frame the lake at its south end are

- Mount Heyburn at 10,229 ft (3,118 m) to the west
- Grand Mogul at 9,733 feet (2,967 m).

== Access and amenities ==
Redfish Lake is approximately five miles (8 km) south of Stanley. A paved access road from State Highway 75 delivers visitors to a recreation area at the north shore of the lake. Facilities include campgrounds, cabins, picnic sites, toilets, drinking water, swimming beaches, a boat launch, and a horse corral. Trailheads grant access to a number of trails for hiking, backpacking, horseback riding, and mountain biking, both around the lake and into the mountains (permits may be required). A visitors center runs interpretive programs.

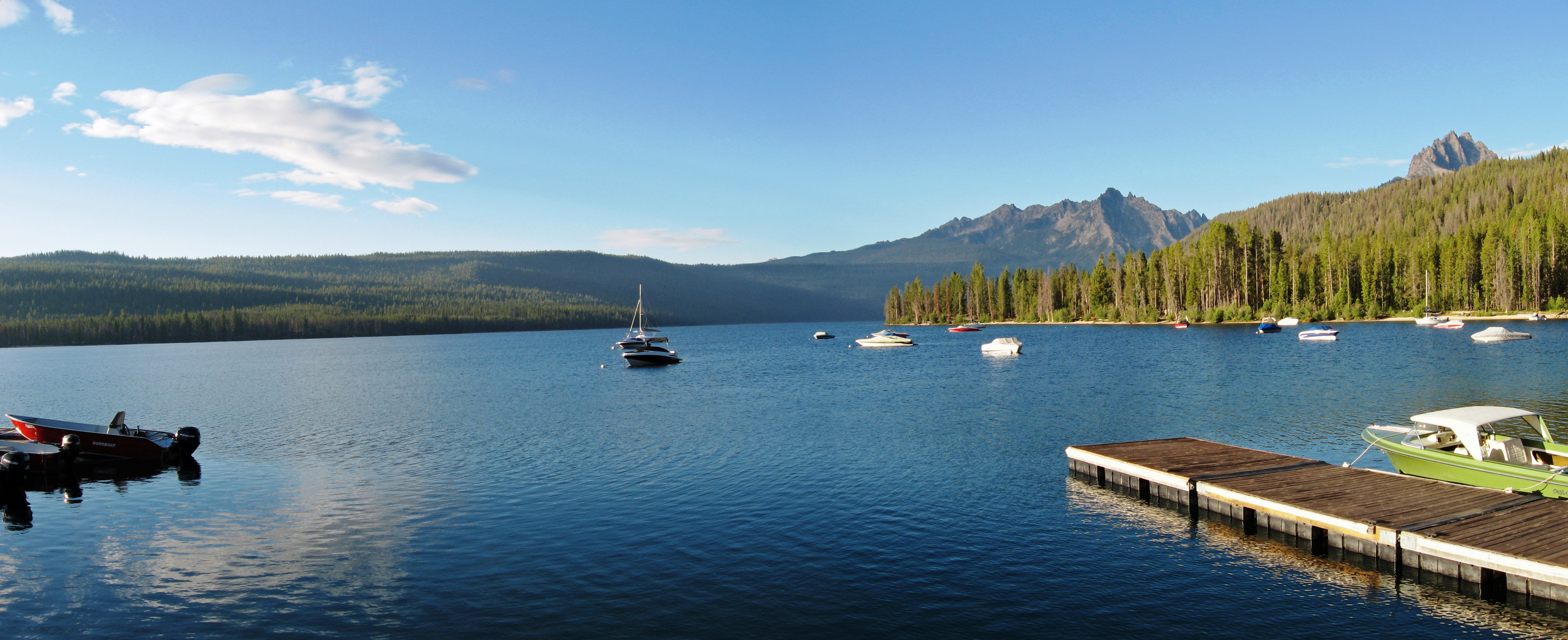
Redfish Lake, looking south
