= List of birds of the Sawtooth National Recreation Area =

This article is an incomplete list of bird species found in the Sawtooth National Recreation Area in central Idaho. It is not an official list, but primarily includes species that are likely to breed or winter in the Sawtooth National Recreation Area and may exclude vagrants and migrants that may pass through during migration.

== Geese, swans, and ducks ==
- Canada goose
- Wood duck
- American wigeon
- Gadwall
- Mallard
- Northern pintail
- Blue-winged teal
- Cinnamon teal
- Northern shoveler
- Green-winged teal
- Canvasback
- Redhead
- Ring-necked duck
- Lesser scaup
- Common goldeneye
- Bufflehead
- Ruddy duck
- Common merganser
- Hooded merganser

== Gallinaceous birds ==
- Wild turkey
- Greater sage grouse
- Ruffed grouse
- Spruce grouse
- Dusky grouse
- Ring-necked pheasant (not native)
- Grey partridge
- Chukar

== Grebes ==
- Pied-billed grebe
- Eared grebe
- Western grebe
- Clark's grebe

== Pelicans ==
- American white pelican

== Cormorants ==
- Double-crested cormorant

== Bitterns, herons, and allies ==
- Great blue heron
- Black-crowned night heron
- American bittern

== Cranes ==
- Sandhill crane

== New World vultures ==
- Turkey vulture

== Hawks, kites, eagles, and allies ==
- Bald eagle
- Golden eagle
- Osprey
- Sharp-shinned hawk
- Cooper's hawk
- Northern goshawk
- Northern harrier
- Rough-legged hawk
- Red-tailed hawk
- Swainson's hawk
- Ferruginous hawk

== Caracaras and falcons ==
- Prairie falcon
- Peregrine falcon
- American kestrel
- Merlin (bird)

== Coots, gallinules, and rails ==
- American coot
- Virginia rail
- Sora

== Plovers ==
- Killdeer

== Sandpipers, phalaropes, and allies ==
- Willet
- Spotted sandpiper
- Wilson's snipe

== Gulls ==
- Ring-billed gull

== Pigeons and doves ==
- Rock pigeon (not native)
- Mourning dove

== Owls ==
- Long-eared owl
- Great horned owl
- Barred owl
- Great grey owl
- Snowy owl
- Western screech owl
- Flammulated owl
- Northern saw-whet owl
- Boreal owl
- Mountain pygmy owl

== Goatsuckers (nightjars) ==
- Common nighthawk

== Hummingbirds ==
- Broad-tailed hummingbird
- Rufous hummingbird
- Calliope hummingbird

== Swifts ==
- White-throated swift

== Kingfishers ==
- Belted kingfisher

== Woodpeckers and allies ==
- Lewis's woodpecker
- Northern flicker
- Williamson's sapsucker
- Red-naped sapsucker
- Hairy woodpecker
- Downy woodpecker
- American three-toed woodpecker
- Black-backed woodpecker
- Pileated woodpecker

== Tyrant flycatchers ==
- Olive-sided flycatcher
- Western wood pewee
- Willow flycatcher
- Cordilleran flycatcher
- Hammond's flycatcher
- American dusky flycatcher

== Miscellaneous flycatchers ==
- Say's phoebe
- Western kingbird
- Eastern kingbird

== Shrikes ==
- Northern shrike
- Loggerhead shrike

== Vireos ==
- Warbling vireo

== Jays, crows, and allies ==
- Steller's jay
- Clark's nutcracker
- Canada jay
- Common raven
- Black-billed magpie
- American crow

== Swallows ==
- Tree swallow
- Bank swallow
- Northern rough-winged swallow
- Violet-green swallow
- Cliff swallow
- Barn swallow

== Larks ==
- Horned lark

== Chickadees and titmice ==
- Black-capped chickadee
- Mountain chickadee

== Nuthatches ==
- White-breasted nuthatch
- Red-breasted nuthatch

== Creepers ==
- Brown creeper

== Wrens ==
- House wren
- Winter wren
- Marsh wren
- Canyon wren
- Rock wren

== Dippers ==
- American dipper

== Kinglets ==
- Ruby-crowned kinglet
- Golden-crowned kinglet

== Thrushes ==
- Western bluebird
- Mountain bluebird
- Townsend's solitaire
- Veery
- Swainson's thrush
- Hermit thrush
- American robin

== Mockingbirds and thrashers ==
- Sage thrasher
- Gray catbird

== Waxwings ==
- Bohemian waxwing
- Cedar waxwing

== Starlings ==
- European starling (not native)

== Wood-warblers ==
- Orange-crowned warbler
- Yellow warbler
- Yellow-rumped warbler
- American redstart
- MacGillivray's warbler
- Common yellowthroat
- Wilson's warbler
- Yellow-breasted chat

== Tanagers ==
- Western tanager

== Emberizids ==
- Spotted towhee
- Lark sparrow
- American tree sparrow
- Chipping sparrow
- Brewer's sparrow
- Savannah sparrow
- Fox sparrow
- Song sparrow
- Lincoln's sparrow
- Vesper sparrow
- White-crowned sparrow
- Dark-eyed junco
- Lapland longspur
- Snow bunting

== Cardinals, buntings, and allies ==
- Black headed grosbeak
- Lazuli bunting

== Blackbirds and orioles ==
- Western meadowlark
- Red-winged blackbird
- Yellow-headed blackbird
- Bobolink
- Brewer's blackbird
- Brown-headed cowbird
- Bullock's oriole

== Finches and allies ==
- Black rosy finch
- Gray-crowned rosy finch
- Red crossbill
- House finch
- Cassin's finch
- Pine grosbeak
- Evening grosbeak
- American goldfinch
- Pine siskin

== Old World sparrows ==
- House sparrow (not native)

== See also ==
- List of animals of the Sawtooth National Recreation Area
- Sawtooth National Forest
- Sawtooth National Recreation Area
