= List of animals of the Sawtooth National Recreation Area =

This is an incomplete list of the species of mammals, reptiles, amphibians, and fish found in the Sawtooth National Recreation Area in central Idaho. Gray wolves were reintroduced to central Idaho in the 1990s while grizzly bears have been extirpated from the area, and plans to reintroduce them have been abandoned. The Sawtooth National Recreation Area supports habitat for Canada lynx and wolverines, but there have been no recent sightings.

== Mammals ==
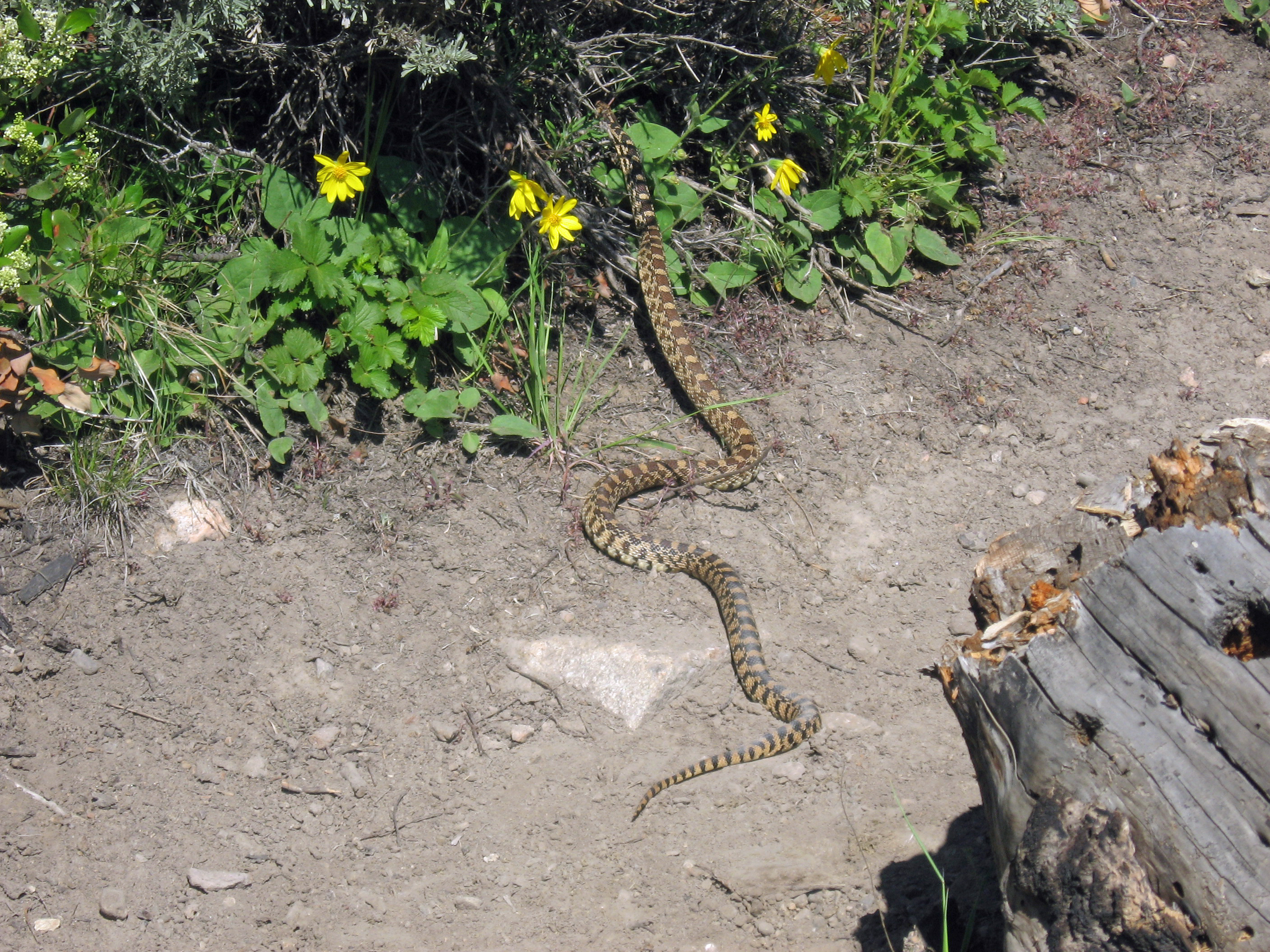
Bull snake in SNRA

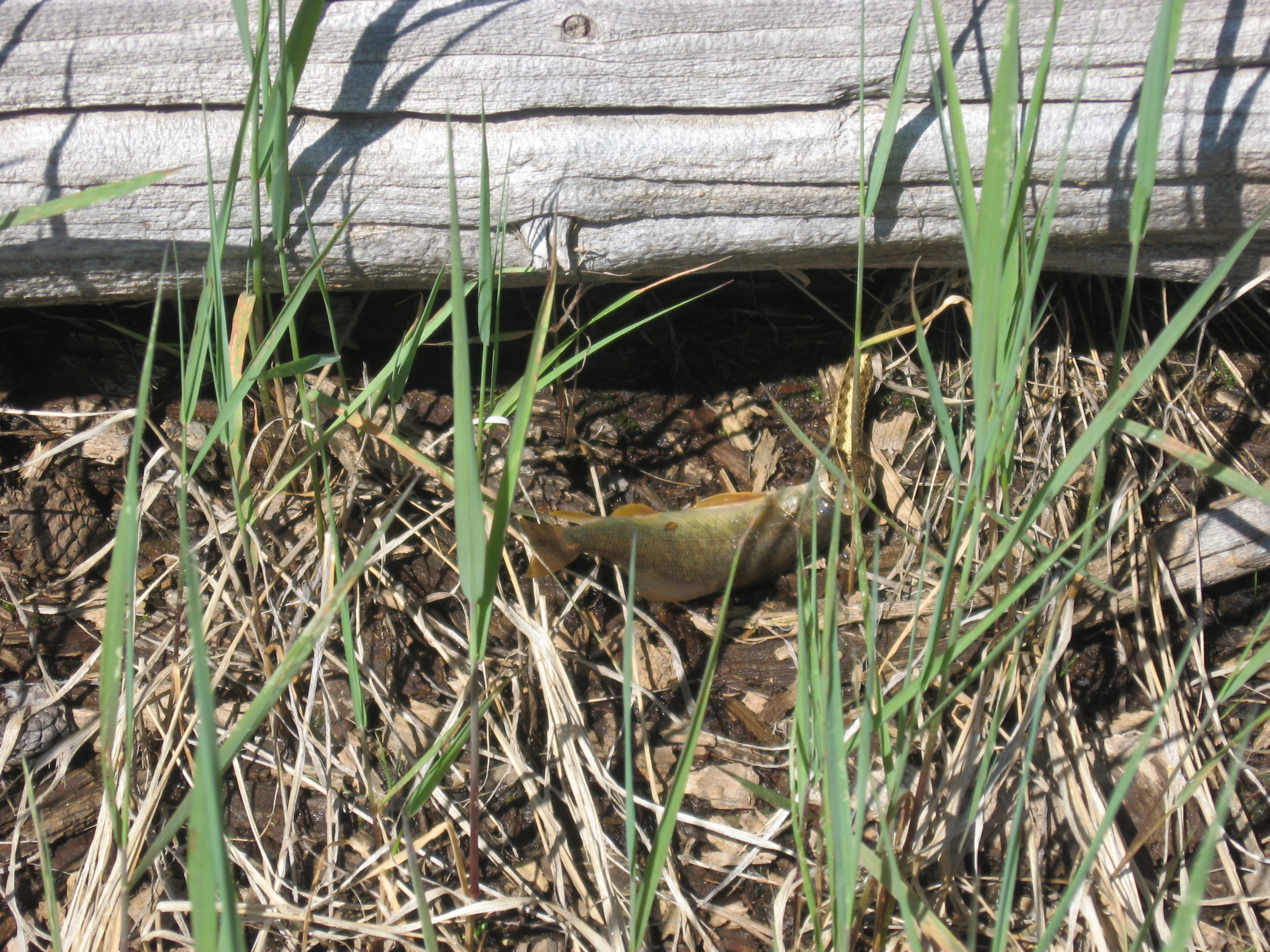
Garter snake eating a shiner in SNRA

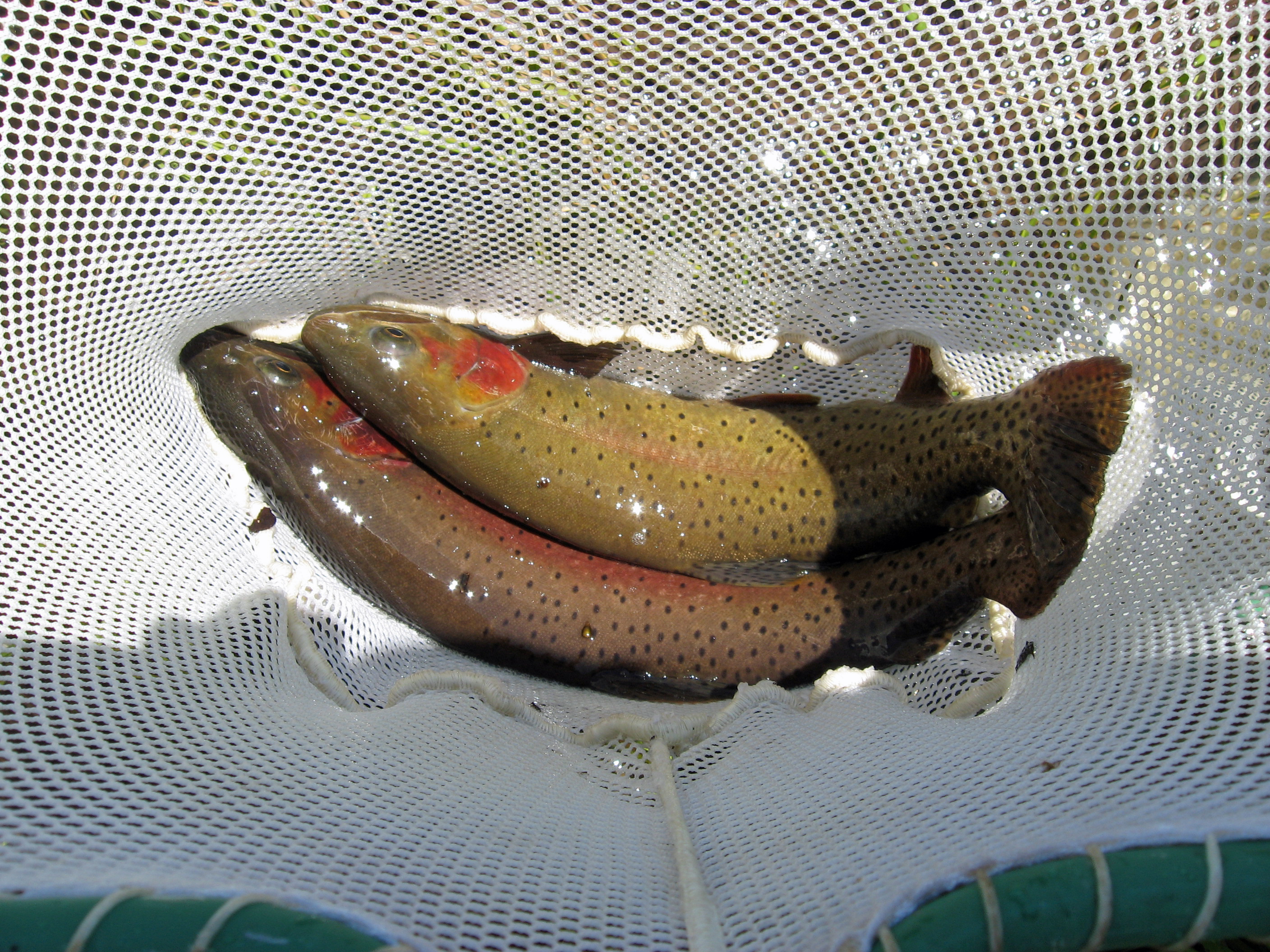
Cutthroat trout in SNRA

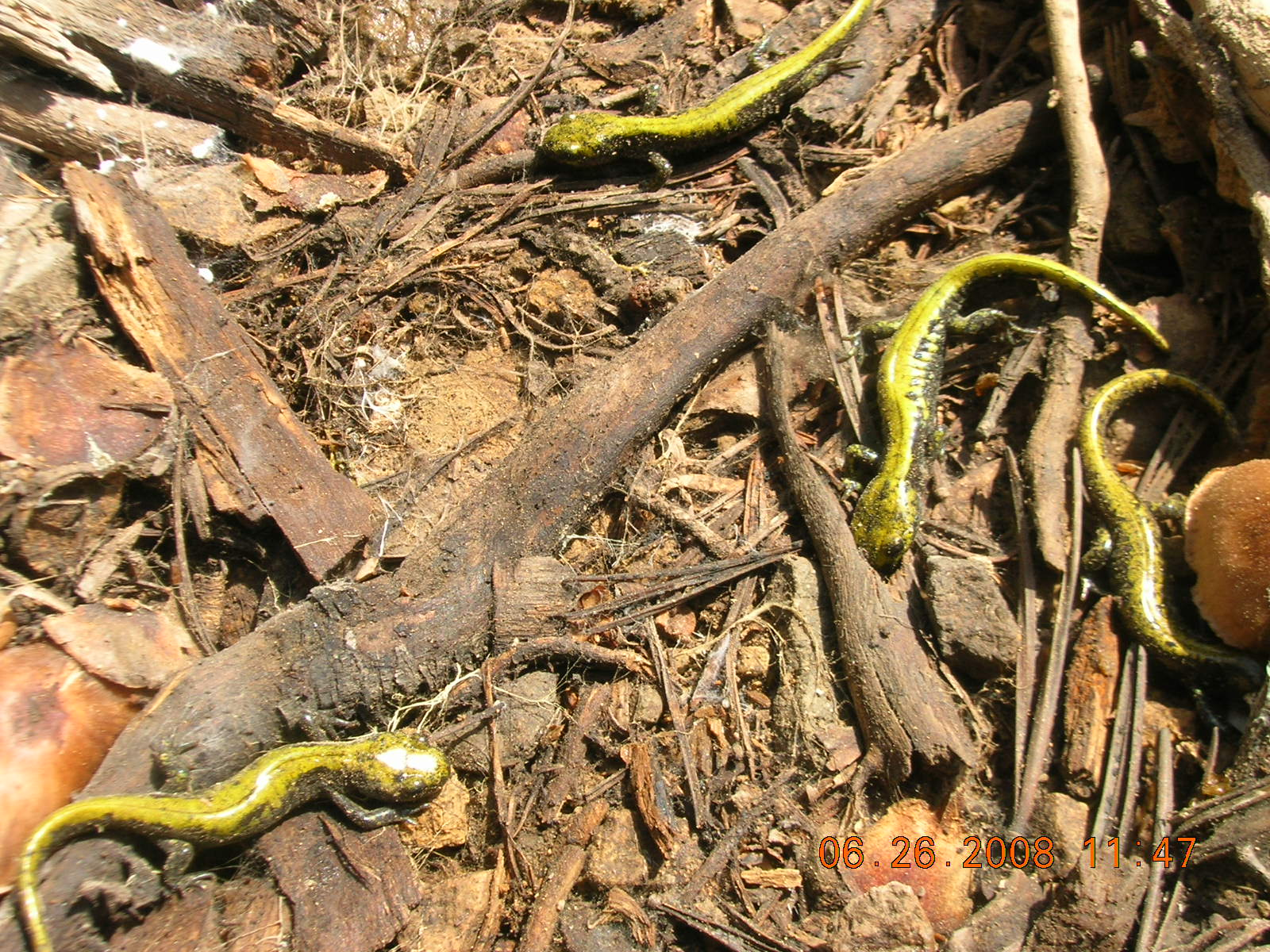
Long-toed salamander in SNRA

- American badger
- American beaver
- American marten
- American pika
- Bighorn sheep
- Black bear
- Bobcat
- Brown rat
- Bushy-tailed woodrat
- Canadian lynx
- Columbian ground squirrel
- Common raccoon
- Cougar
- Coyote
- Deer mouse
- Elk
- Fisher
- Golden-mantled ground squirrel
- Gray wolf (reintroduced)
- Grizzly bear (extirpated)
- House mouse
- Long-tailed weasel
- Marten
- Masked shrew
- Meadow vole
- Mink
- Moose
- Mountain goat
- Mule deer
- Muskrat
- Northern pocket gopher
- Northern river otter
- Porcupine
- Pronghorn
- Red fox
- Red squirrel
- Short-tailed weasel
- Snowshoe hare
- Southern red-backed vole
- Striped skunk
- Water shrew
- Western jumping mouse
- White-tailed jackrabbit
- Wolverine
- Yellow-bellied marmot
- Yellow-pine chipmunk

== Amphibians ==
- Pacific tree frog
- Long-toed salamander
- Columbia spotted frog
- Rocky Mountain tailed frog
- Western toad

== Reptiles ==
- Bullsnake
- Common garter snake
- Rubber boa
- Sagebrush lizard
- Western skink
- Western terrestrial garter snake

== Fish ==
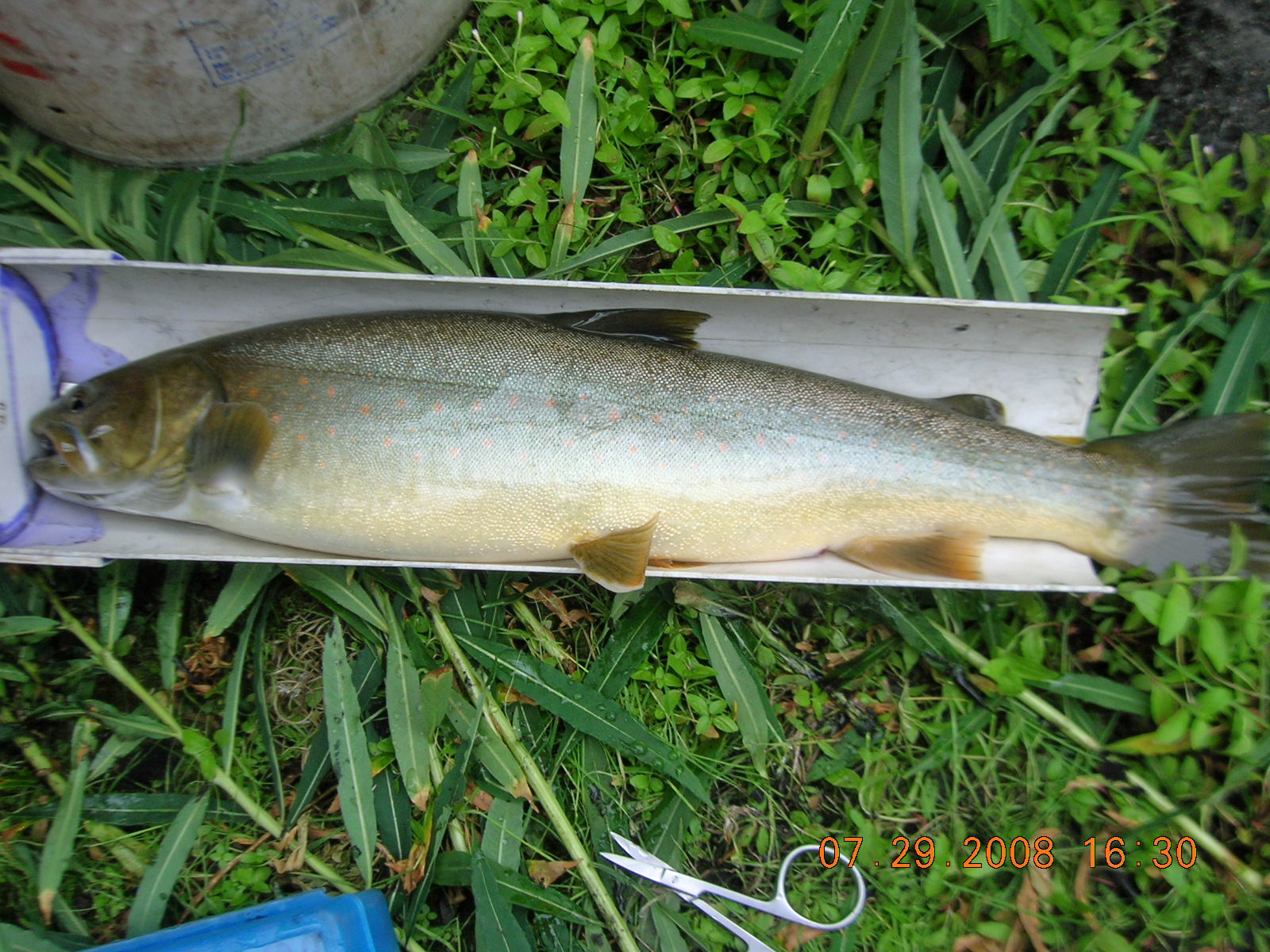
Bull trout in SNRA

- Brook trout (not native)
- Bull trout
- Chinook salmon
- Lake trout
- Longnose sucker
- Mountain whitefish
- Mottled sculpin
- Rainbow trout
- Redside shiner
- Sockeye salmon
- Westslope cutthroat trout
- Wood River sculpin

== See also ==
- List of birds of the Sawtooth National Recreation Area
- Sawtooth National Forest
- Sawtooth National Recreation Area
- Wolves at Our Door - 1997 documentary film about the wolves of Sawtooth
