= Lake Ingeborg =

Alpine lake in the state of Idaho

- Location within Idaho Location within the United States
- Location: Elmore County, Idaho
- Coordinates: 43°57′02″N 115°02′33″W
- Type: Glacial
- Primary outflows: Middle Fork Boise River
- Basin countries: United States
- Max. length: 0.31 mi (0.50 km)
- Max. width: 0.19 mi (0.31 km)
- Surface elevation: 8,800 ft (2,700 m)

Lake Ingeborg is an American small alpine lake in the Sawtooth Mountains of the Sawtooth National Recreation Area in Elmore County, Idaho. It is accessible through the Sawtooth National Forest Trail 462.

Lake Ingeborg is part of the Sawtooth Wilderness, and a wilderness permit must be obtained before visiting. It is upstream from Spangle Lake and Little Spangle Lake.

== See also ==
- List of lakes of the Sawtooth Mountains (Idaho)
- Sawtooth National Forest
- Sawtooth National Recreation Area
- Sawtooth Range (Idaho)
