= Low Pass Lake =

Alpine lake in the state of Idaho

- Location within Idaho Location within the United States
- Location: Elmore County, Idaho
- Coordinates: 43°56′47″N 115°03′00″W
- Type: Glacial
- Primary outflows: Timpa Creek to Middle Fork Boise River
- Basin countries: United States
- Max. length: 0.12 mi (0.19 km)
- Max. width: 0.09 mi (0.14 km)
- Surface elevation: 8,920 ft (2,720 m)

Low Pass Lake is a small alpine lake in Elmore County, Idaho, United States, located in the Sawtooth Mountains in the Sawtooth National Recreation Area. The lake is accessed from Sawtooth National Forest trail 479 along Timpa Creek or 462 along Lake Ingeborg.

Low Pass Lake is in the Sawtooth Wilderness, and a wilderness permit can be obtained at a registration box at trailheads or wilderness boundaries. Lake Ingeborg is 0.30 mi (0.48 km) from Low Pass Lake, although it is over a pass and in a different sub-basin.

== See also ==
- List of lakes of the Sawtooth Mountains (Idaho)
- Sawtooth National Forest
- Sawtooth National Recreation Area
- Sawtooth Range (Idaho)
