= Sawtooth National Recreation Area =

National recreation area in Idaho, US

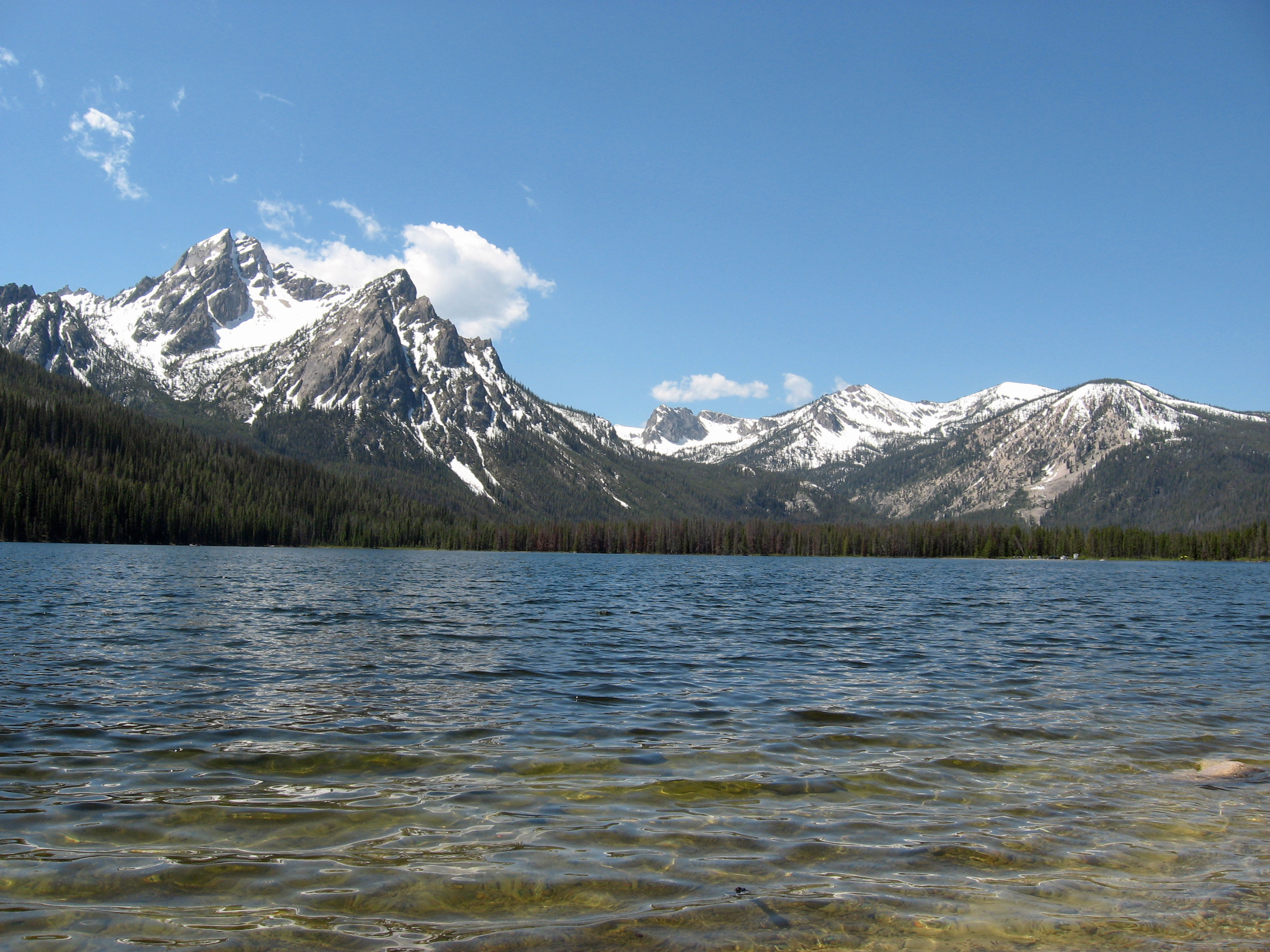
- Stanley Lake in Sawtooth National Recreation Area

- Location within the United States
- Location: Blaine, Boise, Custer, and Elmore counties, Idaho, United States
- Nearest city: Sun Valley, Idaho
- Coordinates: 44°00′N 114°42′W
- Area: 730,864 acres (295,770 ha)
- Established: August 22, 1972
- Governing body: U.S. Forest Service
- Website: https://www.fs.usda.gov/r04/sawtooth

The Sawtooth National Recreation Area (SNRA) is a national recreation area in central Idaho, United States that is managed as part of Sawtooth National Forest. The recreation area, established on August 22, 1972, is managed by the U.S. Forest Service, and includes the Sawtooth, Hemingway–Boulders, and Cecil D. Andrus–White Clouds wilderness areas. Activities within the 730,864-acre (2,957.70 km^{2}) recreation area include hiking, backpacking, White water rafting, camping, rock climbing, kayaking, mountain biking, fishing, and hunting.

The SNRA headquarters are about seven miles (11 km) north of Ketchum on Highway 75. SNRA also has a ranger station in Stanley, near its northern boundary.

== History ==
The SNRA was created on August 22, 1972, by Pub. L. 92–400, which also included the creation of the Sawtooth Wilderness from the Sawtooth Primitive Area. The White Clouds and Hemingway–Boulders wilderness areas were created on August 7, 2015, by Public Law 114-46. Between 1998 and 2010 an outbreak of Mountain pine beetle killed thousands of Lodgepole Pine across the Sawtooth Valley. In recent years forest management activity has increased in the form of Prescribed Fire, commercial Logging, and non-commercial thinning of dead and diseased trees throughout the Sawtooth NRA. Active Forest management is designed to reduce hazardous wildfire fuel, restore beetle killed forests, regenerate young growth, and prevent the further spread of Bark beetle and disease such as dwarf mistletoe. Forest management activities have been developed and supported by the local residents through the Sawtooth Valley Wildfire Collaborative.

== Geology ==
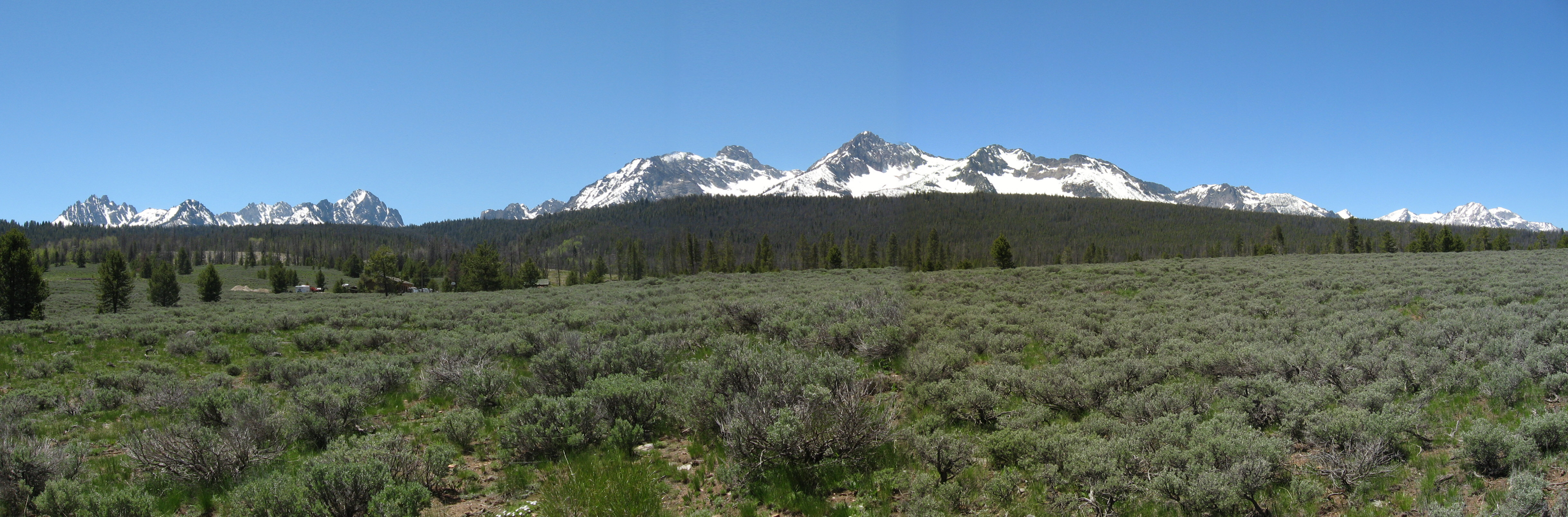
Sawtooth Mountains

Much of the SNRA was heavily glaciated, especially in the Sawtooth Mountains where remnants of these glaciers exist as glacial lakes, moraines, hanging valleys, cirques, and arêtes. The Sawtooth Fault stretches 40 mi (64 km) long, and runs through the Sawtooth Valley, while the two past large earthquakes likely took place on the fault around 7,000 and 4,000 years b.p.

=== Mountains ===
The Sawtooth Mountains are in the SNRA, along with the White Cloud, Boulder, and Smoky mountains. The highest point in the SNRA is Castle Peak at 11,815 ft (3,601 m) in the White Cloud Mountains, while the second-highest point is Ryan Peak at 11,714 ft (3,570 m) in the Boulder Mountains. Thompson Peak, at an elevation of 10,751 ft (3,277 m), is the highest point in the Sawtooth Mountains, while Saviers Peak at 10,441 feet (3,182 m) is the highest point in the Smoky Mountains.

=== Rivers ===
The headwaters of the Salmon River, also known as the "River of No Return" are in the SNRA, and the river flows north through the Sawtooth Valley before turning east in Stanley and following the northern border of the SNRA. The headwaters of the Big Wood, Boise, and Payette rivers are also in SNRA.

=== Lakes ===
There are hundreds of lakes in the SNRA, most of which have been created by alpine glaciers. The largest lakes are Redfish, Alturas, Pettit, Yellow Belly, Stanley, and Sawtooth lakes.

- List of lakes of the Sawtooth Mountains
- List of lakes of the White Cloud Mountains

== Wildlife ==
Timber wolves were reintroduced in the 1990s and plans to reintroduce grizzly bears have been abandoned. The SNRA contains prime habitat for wolverines and the endangered Canadian lynx, but no recent sightings have been reported. Bull trout are the management indicator species for the SNRA and population monitoring efforts are undertaken every year.

- List of animals of the Sawtooth National Recreation Area
- List of birds of the Sawtooth National Recreation Area

== Popular culture ==
A 2003 memoir by John Rember, Traplines: Coming Home to the Sawtooth Valley, describes the life and culture of Stanley, Idaho before and after establishment of the Sawtooth National Recreation Area.

Clint Eastwood's 1985 film Pale Rider was filmed in the SNRA, mostly in the Boulder Mountains in the fall of 1984. The opening credits scene was shot south of Stanley in front of the Sawtooth Mountains. The SNRA is one of the settings of Lionsgate's 2010 3-D computer-animated film Alpha and Omega.

== The Goat Plate ==
The mountain goat is a universal symbol signifying the human need to find high, quiet places. In Idaho, the mountain goat license plate symbolizes the importance of protecting the high quiet places like those found in the Sawtooth National Recreation Area (SNRA).

The program generates roughly $50,000, annually — to date, 219 projects benefitting the SNRA have been funded through this innovative program. The Idaho Department of Motor Vehicles created a license plate depicting the SNRA as part of their special license plate program intended to grant funds for various causes. (see right).

== Sawtooth Interpretive and Historical Association ==
The Sawtooth Interpretive and Historical Association (SIHA) was founded in 1972, the same year that the SNRA was created. The mission of SIHA is to protect and advance the natural and cultural history of Idaho's Sawtooth – Salmon River Country through preservation and education.

=== Stanley Museum ===
SIHA has managed the Stanley Museum since the early 1980s. The Stanley Museum was the original Valley Creek Ranger Station. Today visitors can explore exhibits within the museum and learn about local history.

==== Redfish Visitor Center and Gallery ====
Located on Redfish Lake in the heart of the SNRA, the Redfish Visitor Center and Gallery is the oldest National Forest visitor center in the contiguous US. Built in the early 1960s and operated for many years by the USFS. In 2011 SIHA began working in partnership with the USFS to manage the Redfish Visitor Center and Gallery. Educational programs are provided through the summer to visitors of all ages by SIHA naturalists.

== Sawtooth Society ==
The Sawtooth Society was founded in 1997 by a group of dedicated supporters of the Sawtooth National Recreational Area. At the time of the Sawtooth Society's founding, a major threat had arisen in the Stanley Basin: a highly visible and unapproved 160-acre subdivision. The Society negotiated an end to the project and successfully urged Congress to appropriate $17 million to the U.S. Forest Service for the purchase of conservation easements protecting this land in perpetuity. The Sawtooth Society has long been dedicated to these four outcomes:

Advocacy The Society mobilized policy-makers and the public to address threats facing the SNRA; joined with the Forest Service to initiate Sawtooth Vision 20/20, and helped develop management plans for SNRA Wilderness Areas.

Preserving Open Space The Sawtooth Society has worked with the Administration and Congress to secure $17 million in federal funds for the purchase of conservation easements in the SNRA; published "What Works" a document to clarify and distribute private land regulations to encourage inconspicuous development; educated private landowners about their responsibility in making development less conspicuous.

Enhancing Recreation Facilities and Services The Sawtooth Society supported USFS efforts from 2005 through the present to design, build and fund the Stanley to Redfish Lake trail. The Society also coordinated nearly $1 Million in Goat License Plate grants for 220 enhancement projects to benefit the SNRA and all who live, work and recreate in it.

Facilitating Stewardship and Volunteer Projects Since 2014 the Sawtooth Society facilitated and coordinated projects including 13,400 hours of labor which resulted in clearing more than 4,980 trees from 612 miles of trails and providing stewardship education opportunities to more than 400 youth.

== Gallery ==
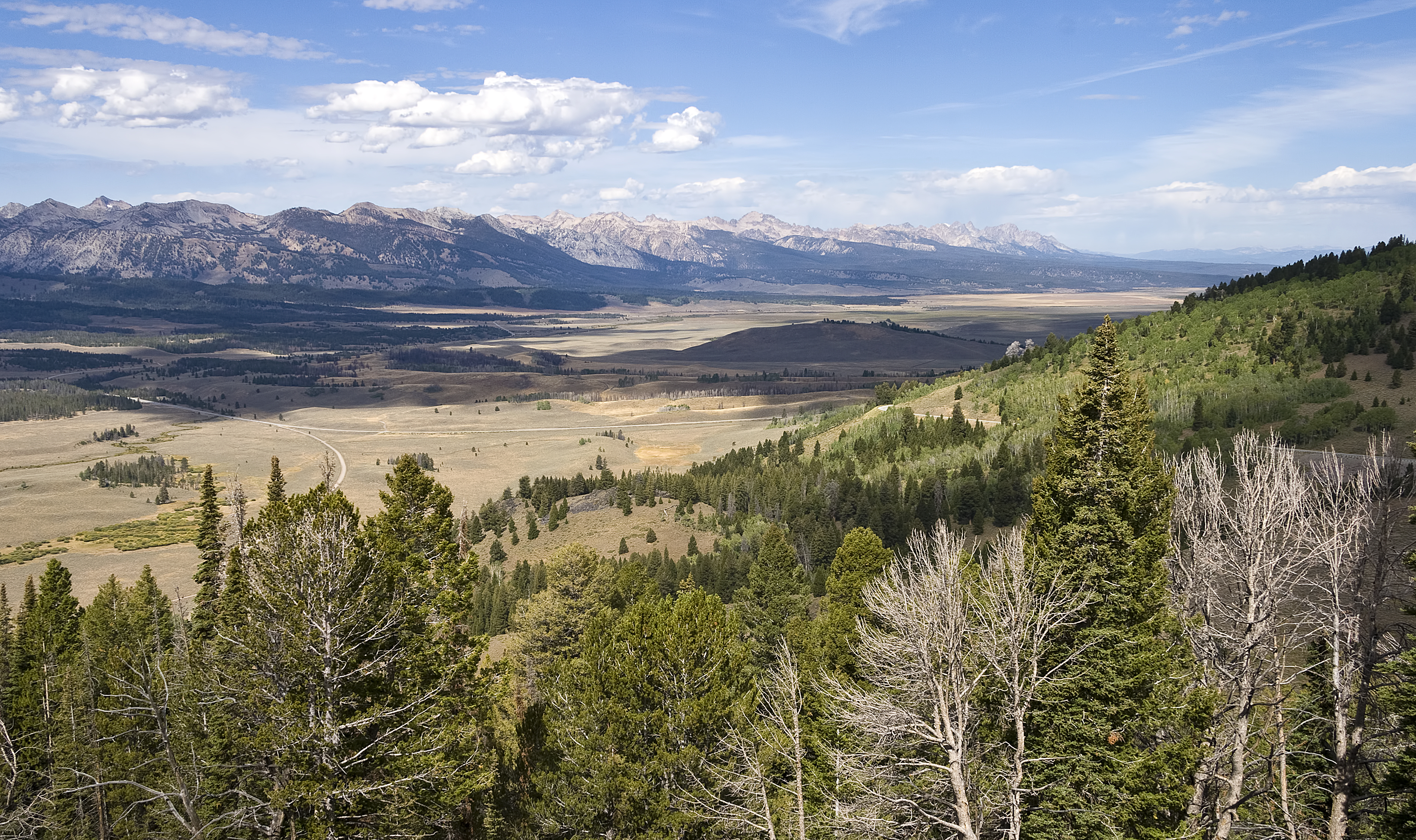
Sawtooth Valley from Galena Summit

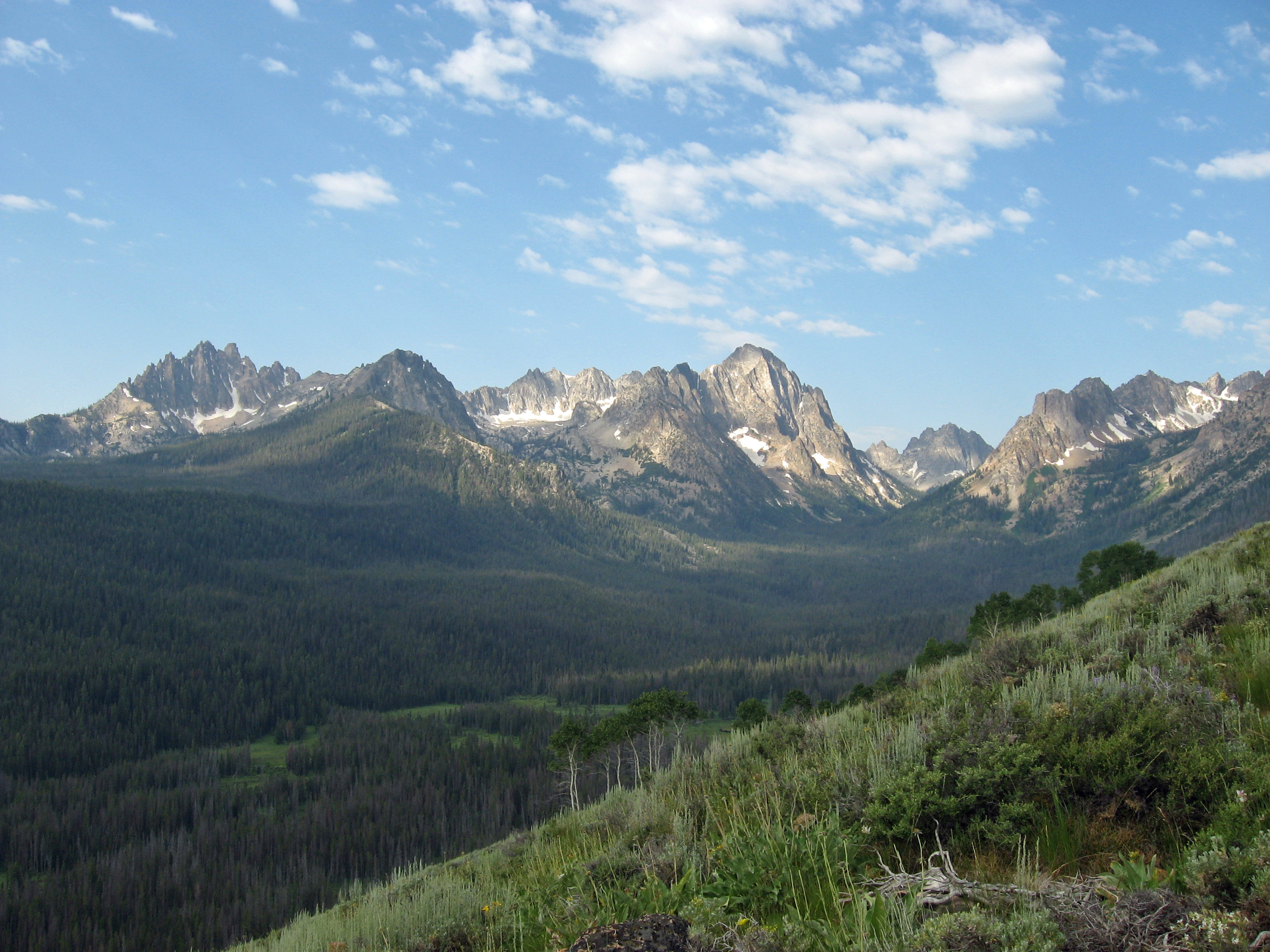
Sawtooth Mountains

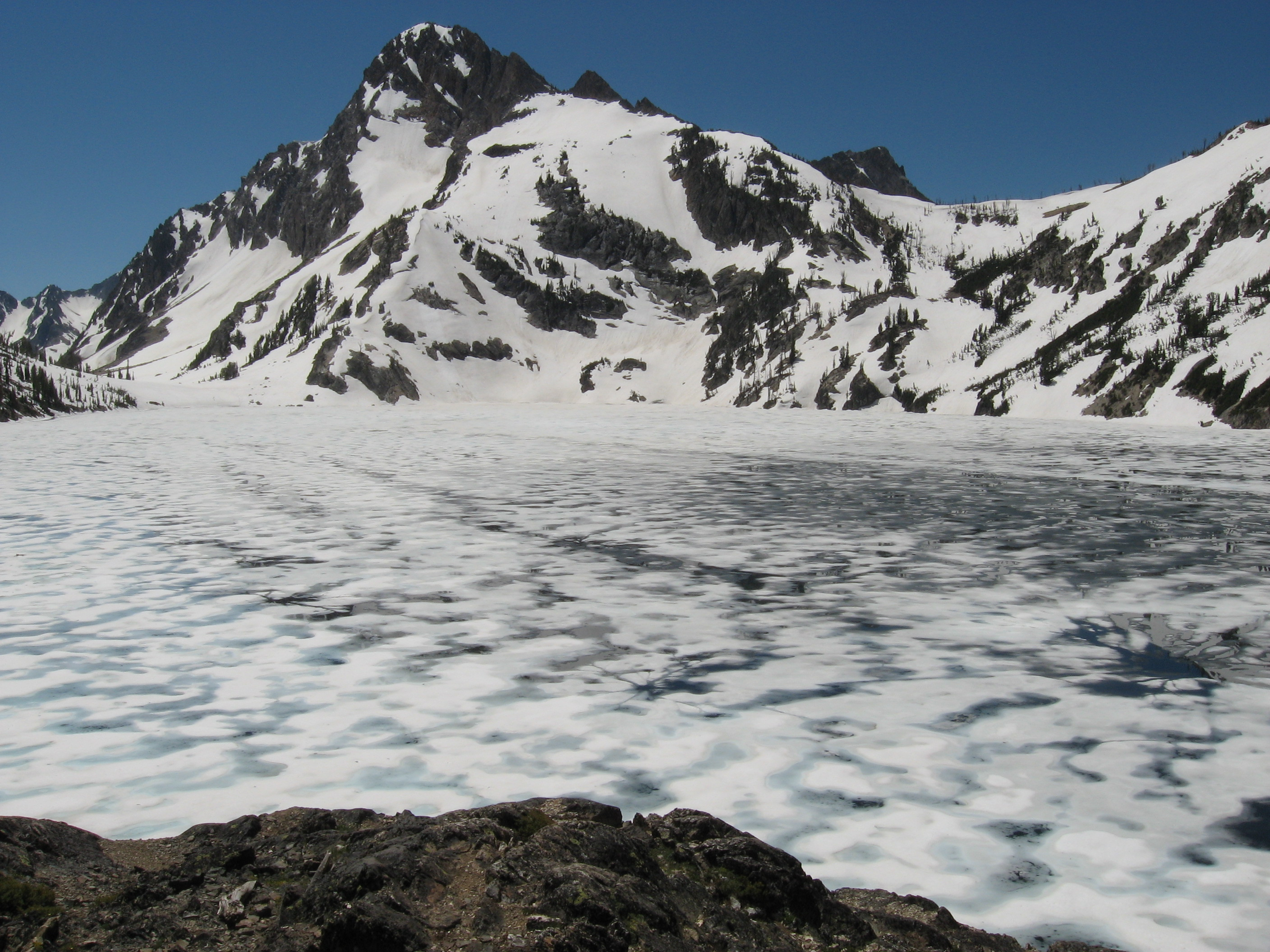
Sawtooth Lake

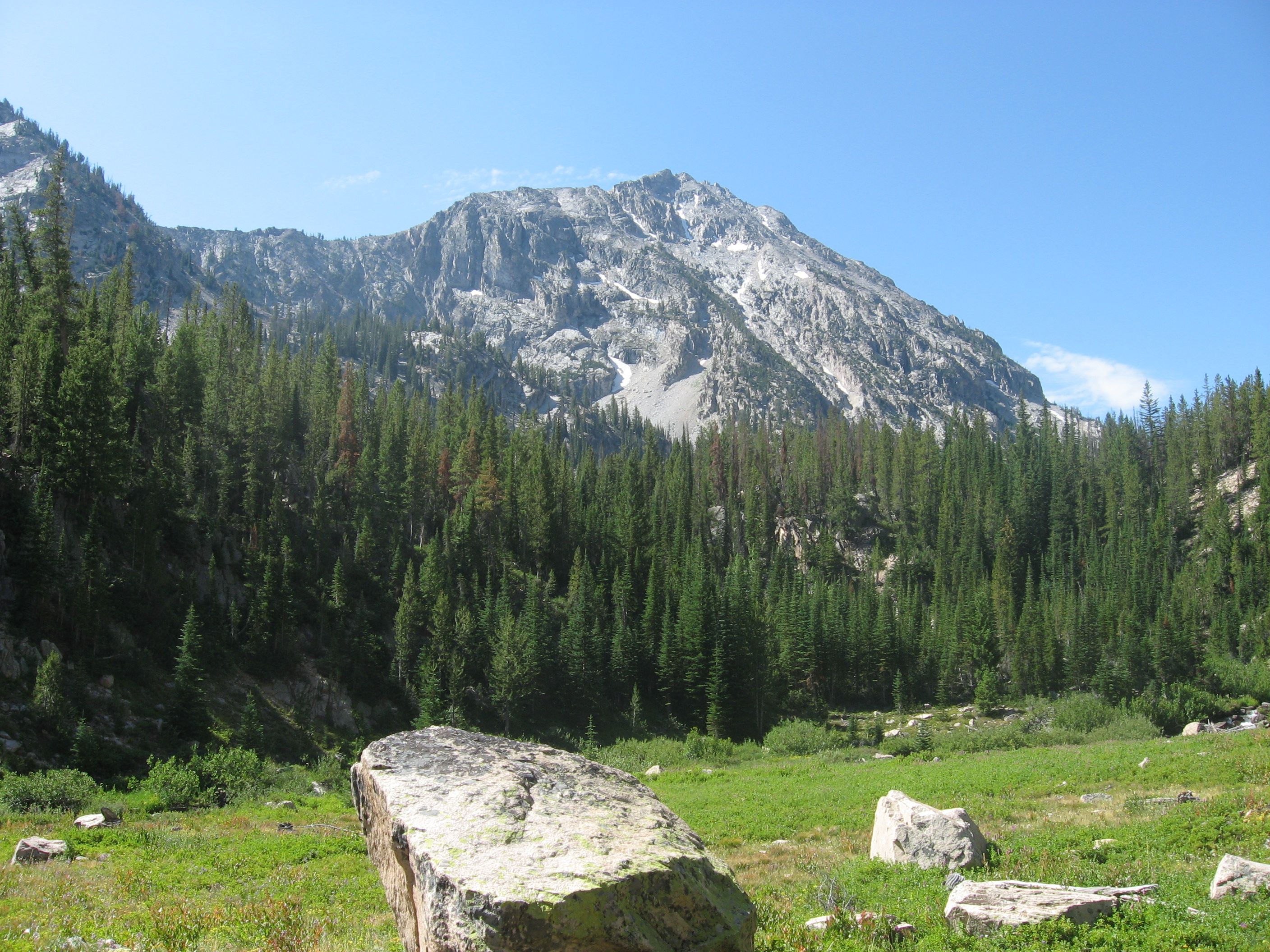
Parks Peak

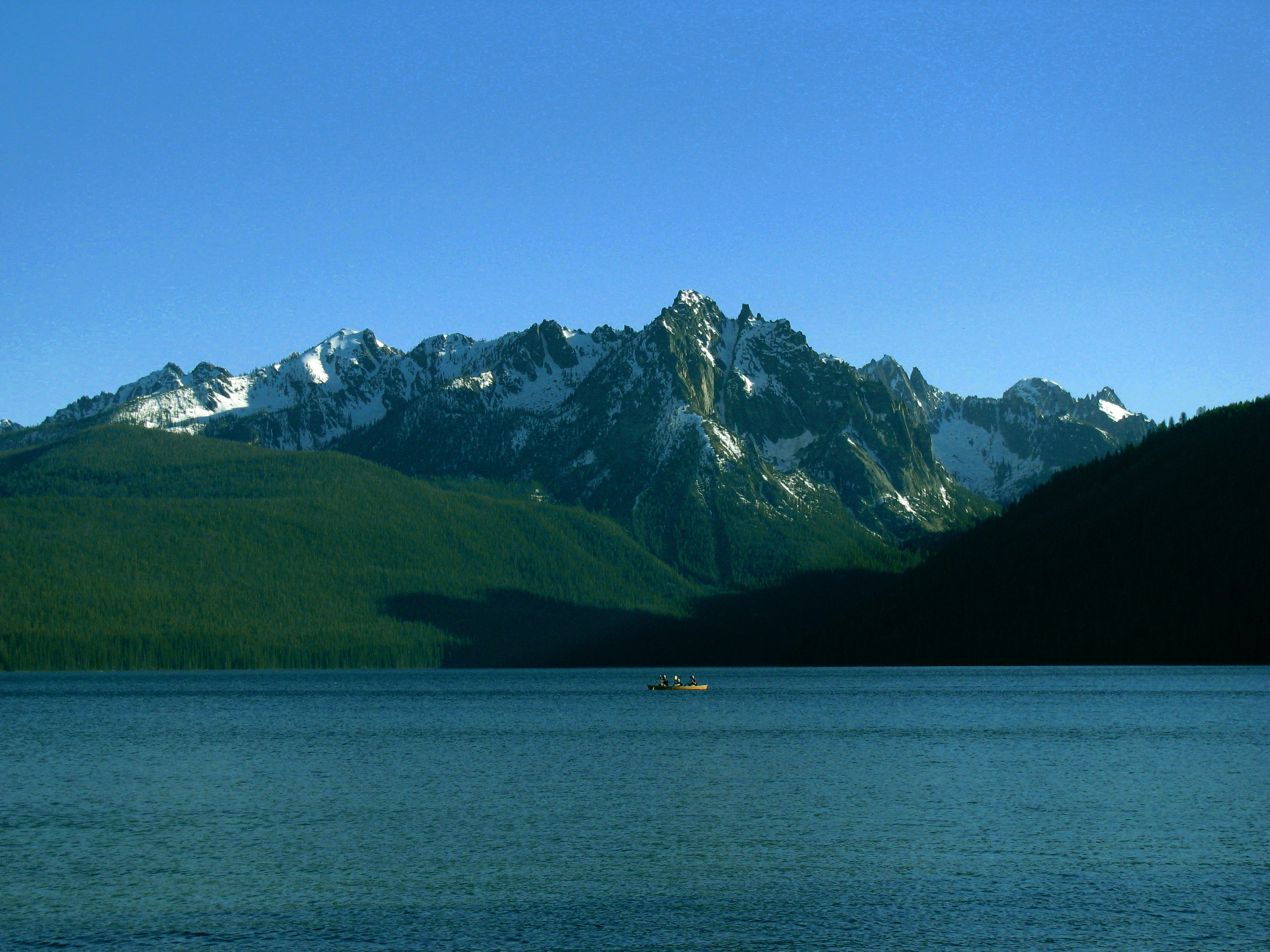
Redfish lake

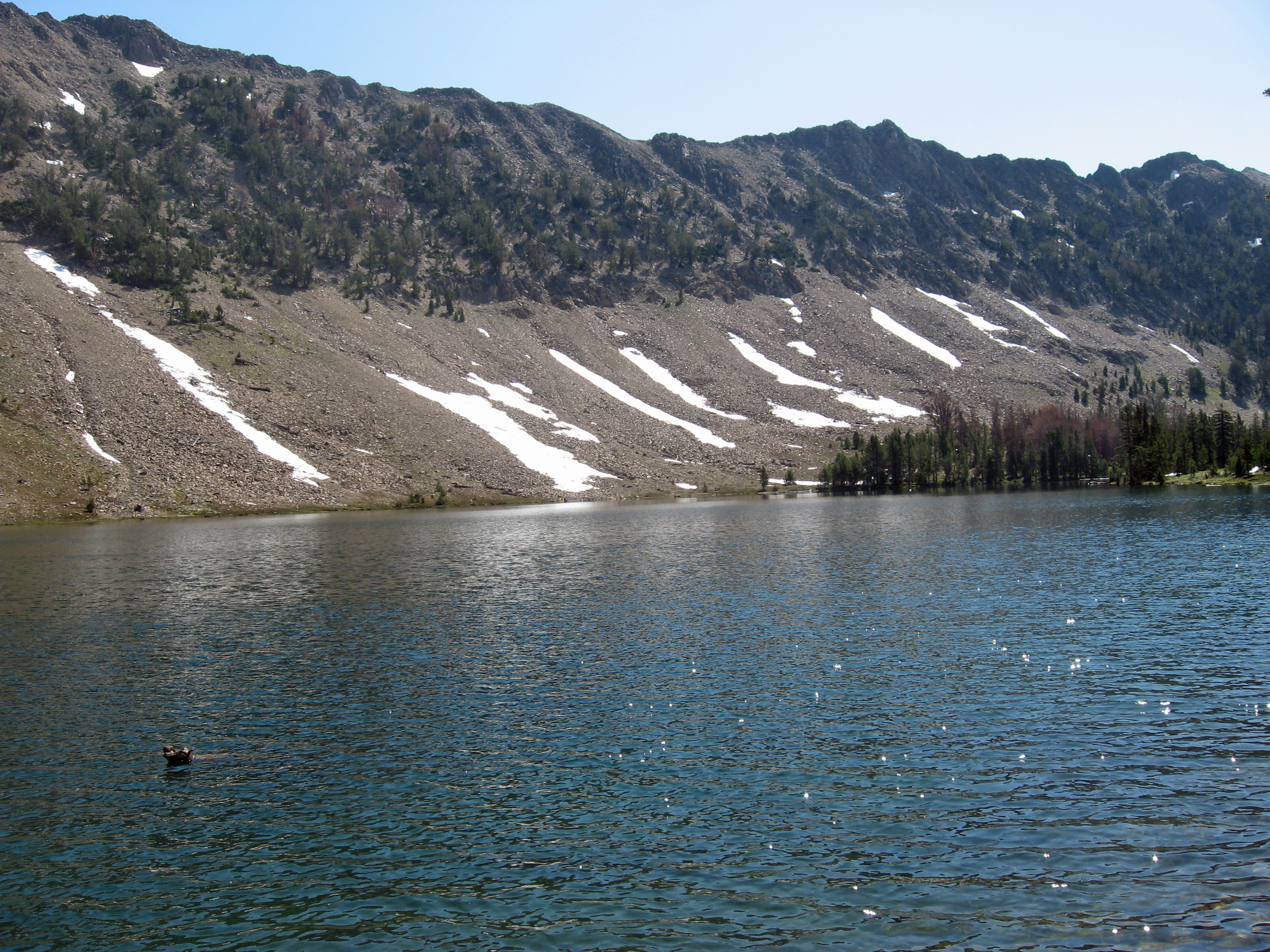
Washington Lake

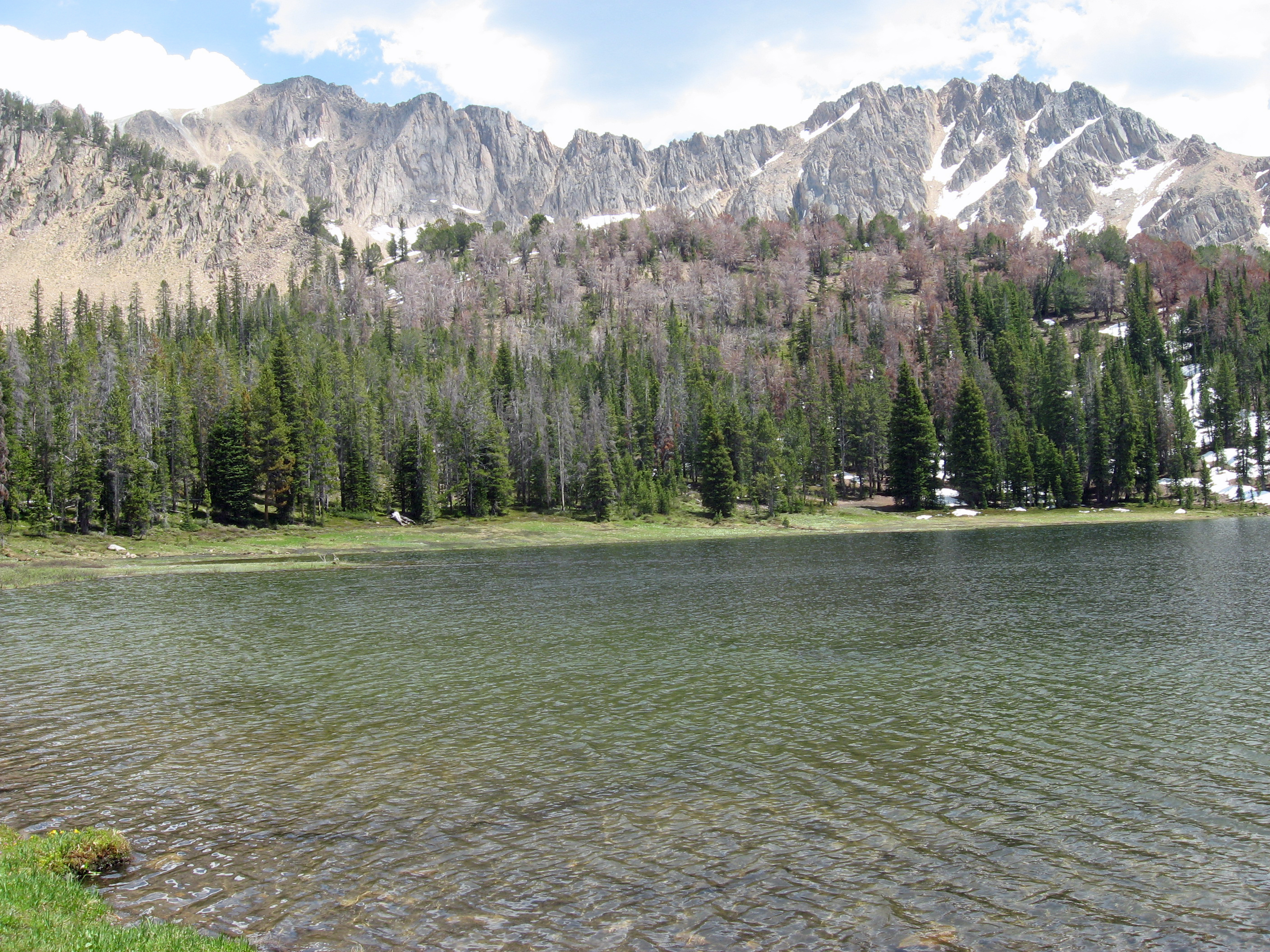
Fourth of July Lake

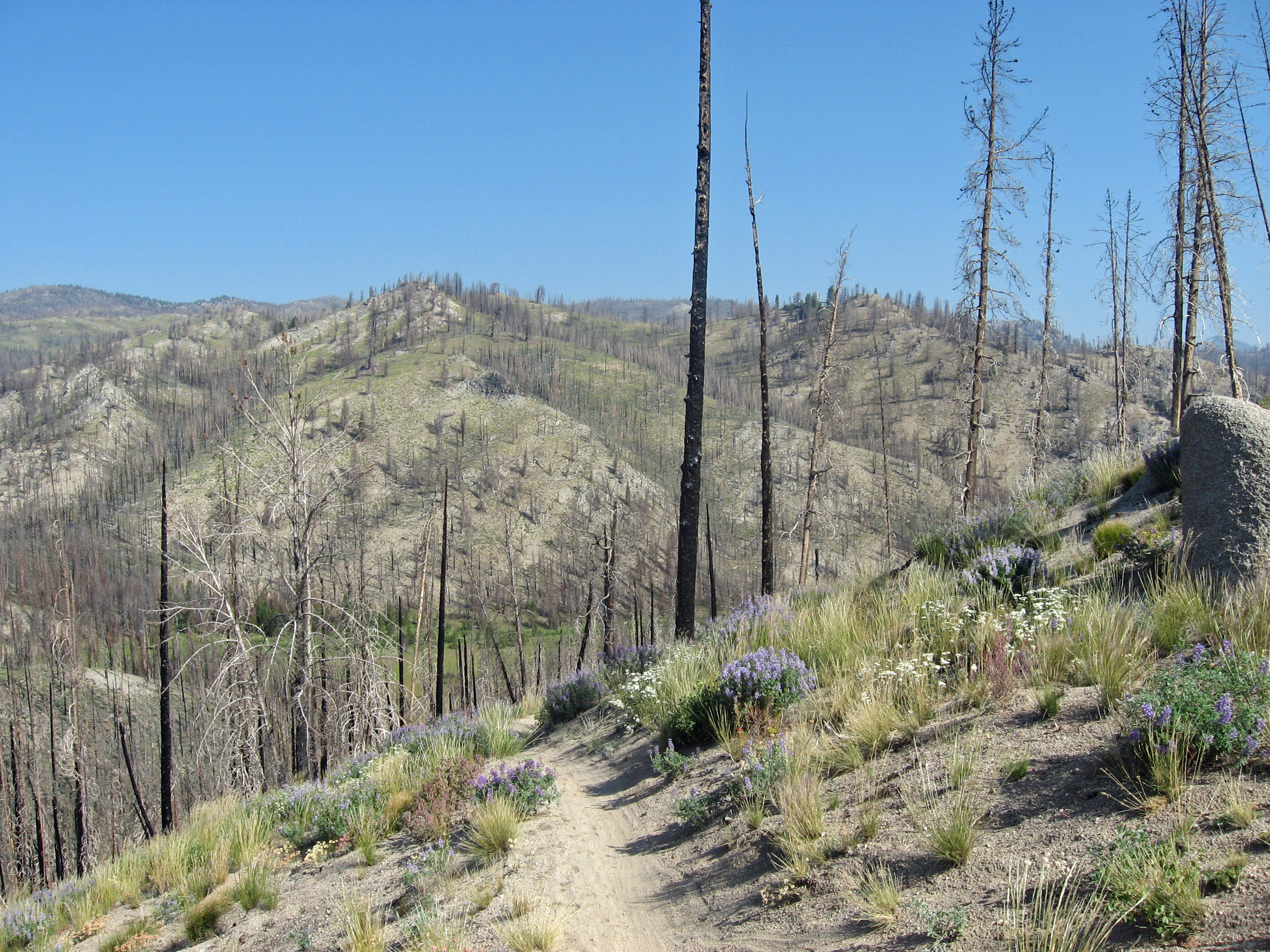
Fisher Creek Trail

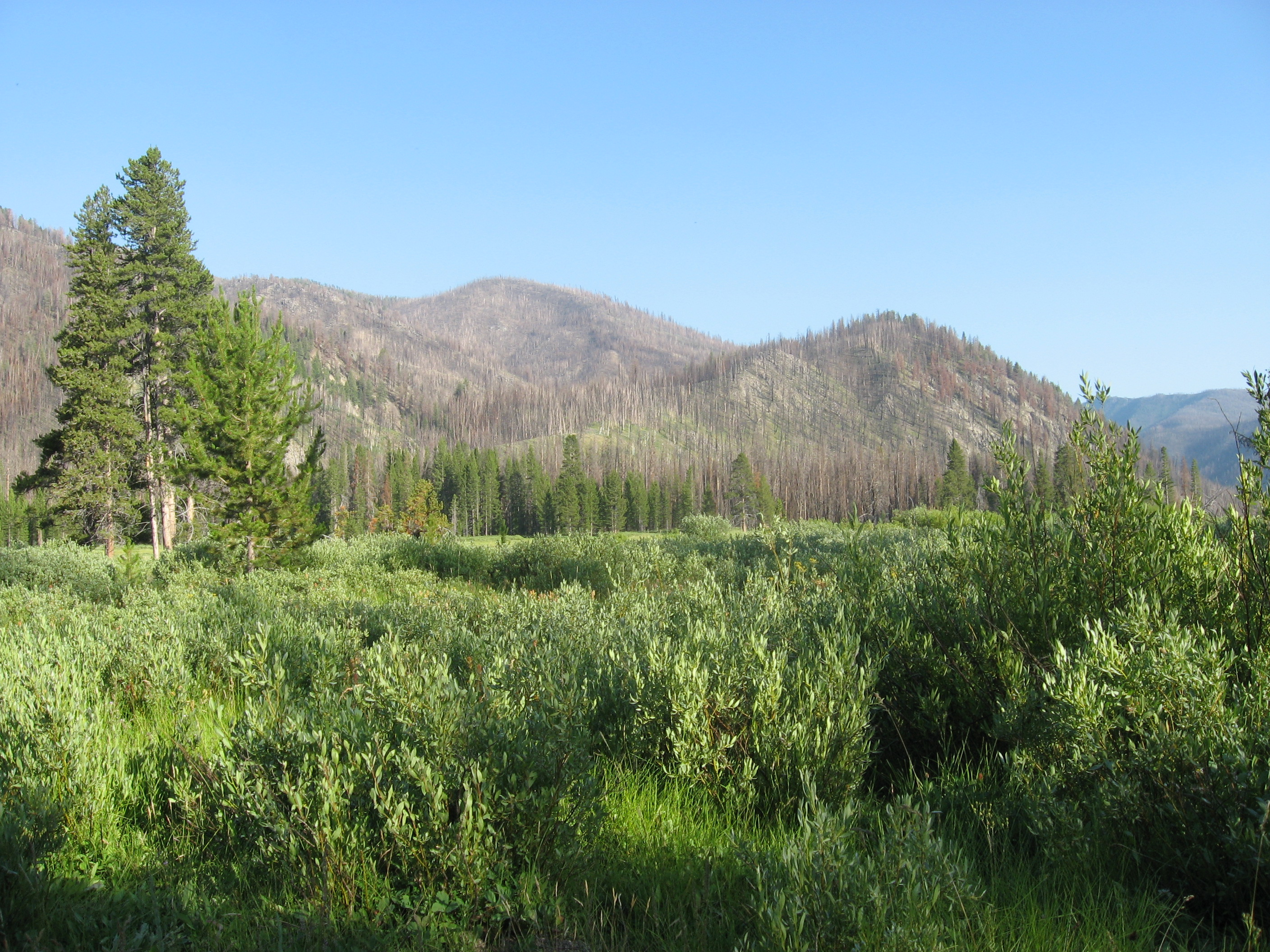
Warms Springs Creak Meadow

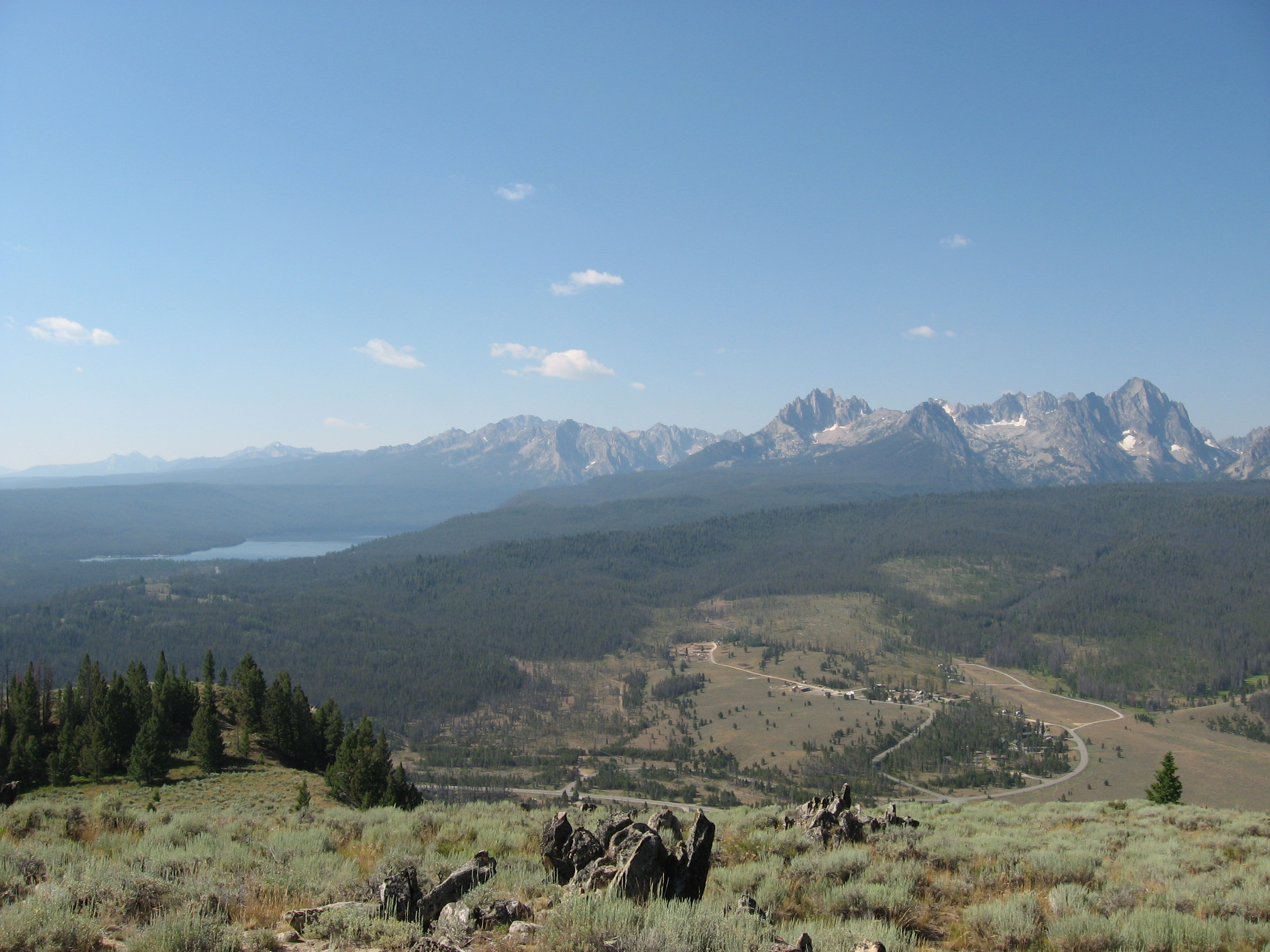
Sawtooth Valley and Sawtooth Mountains

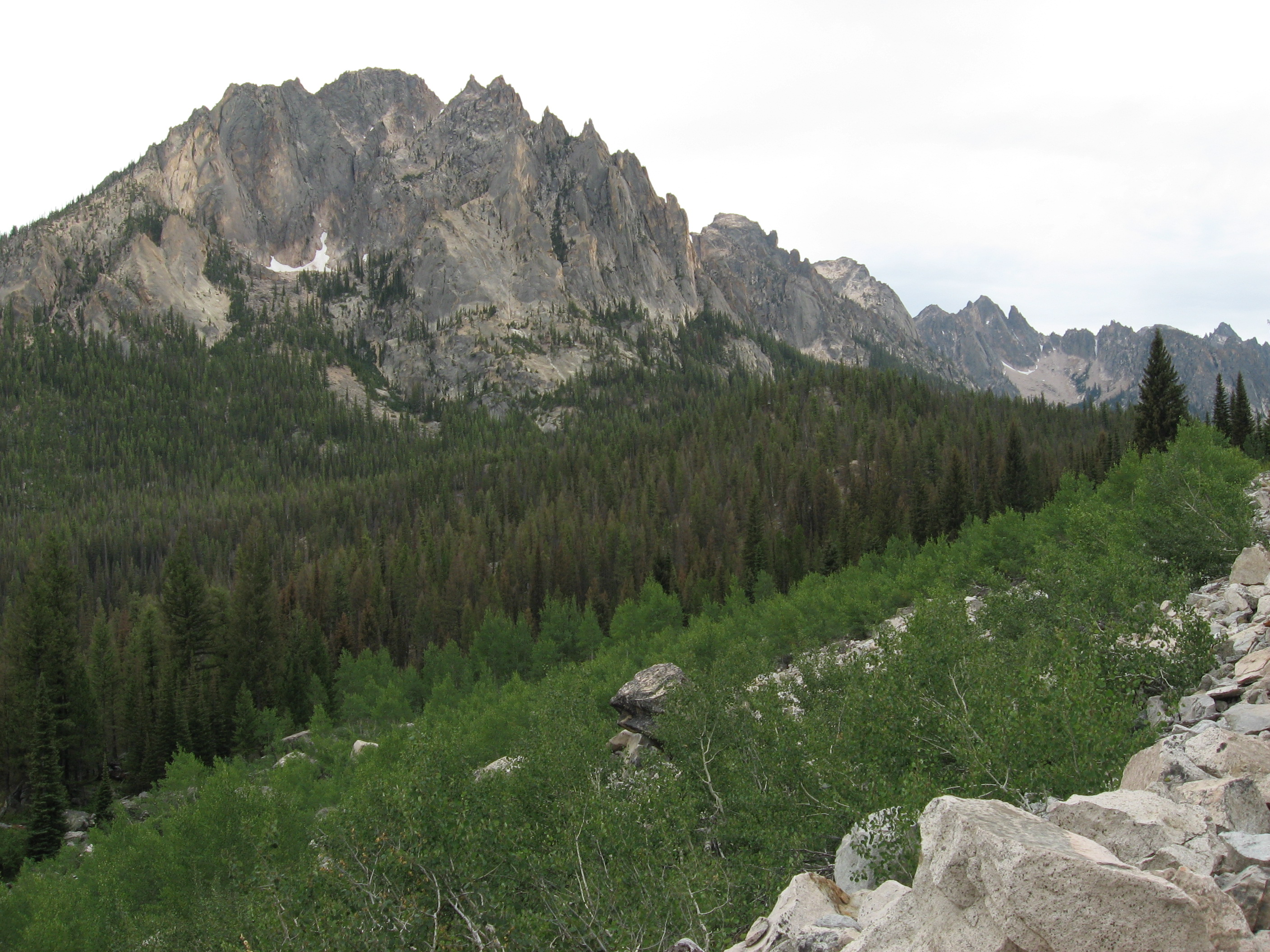
Grand Mogul and Redfish Lake Creek Valley

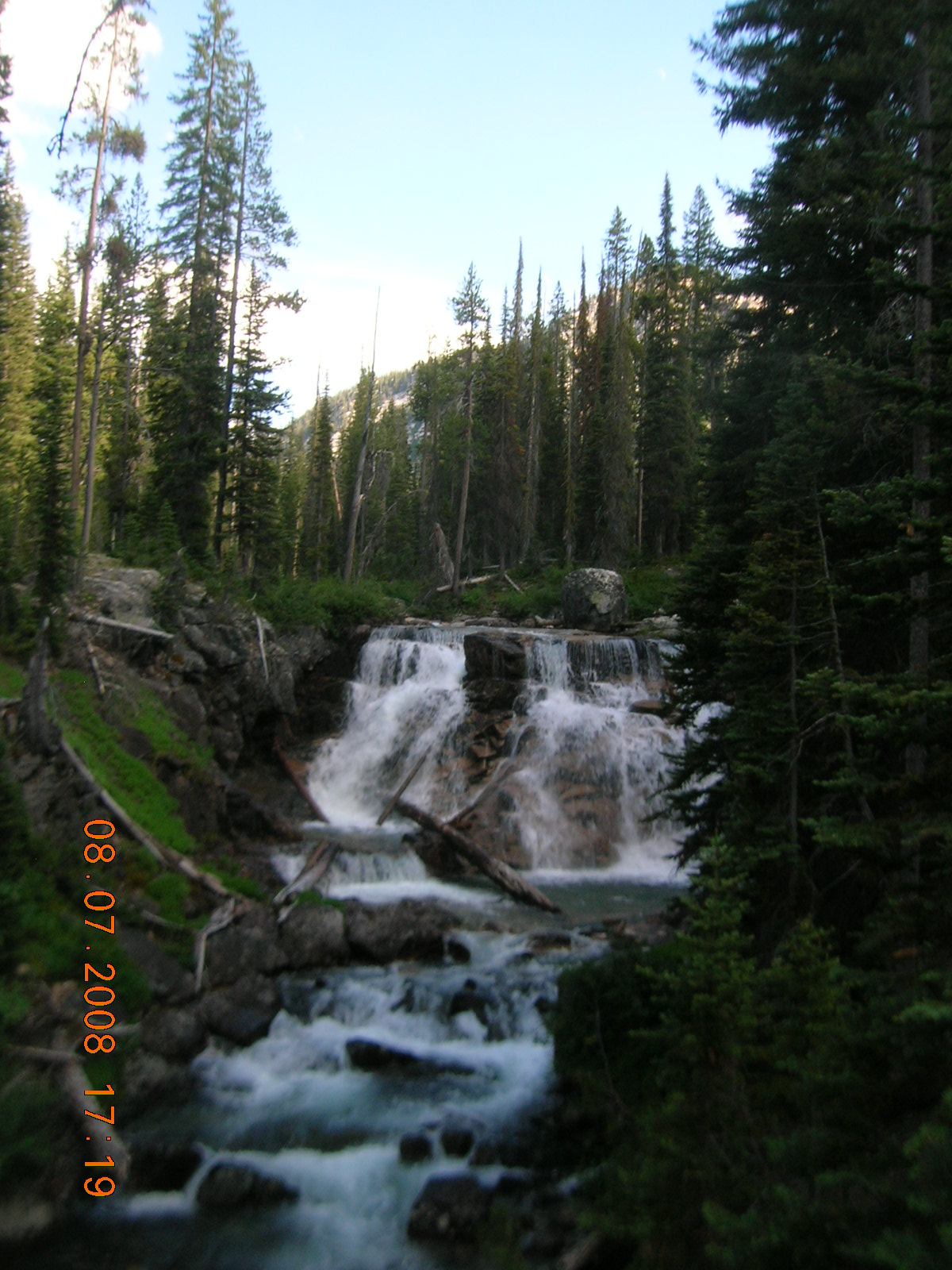
Smith Falls

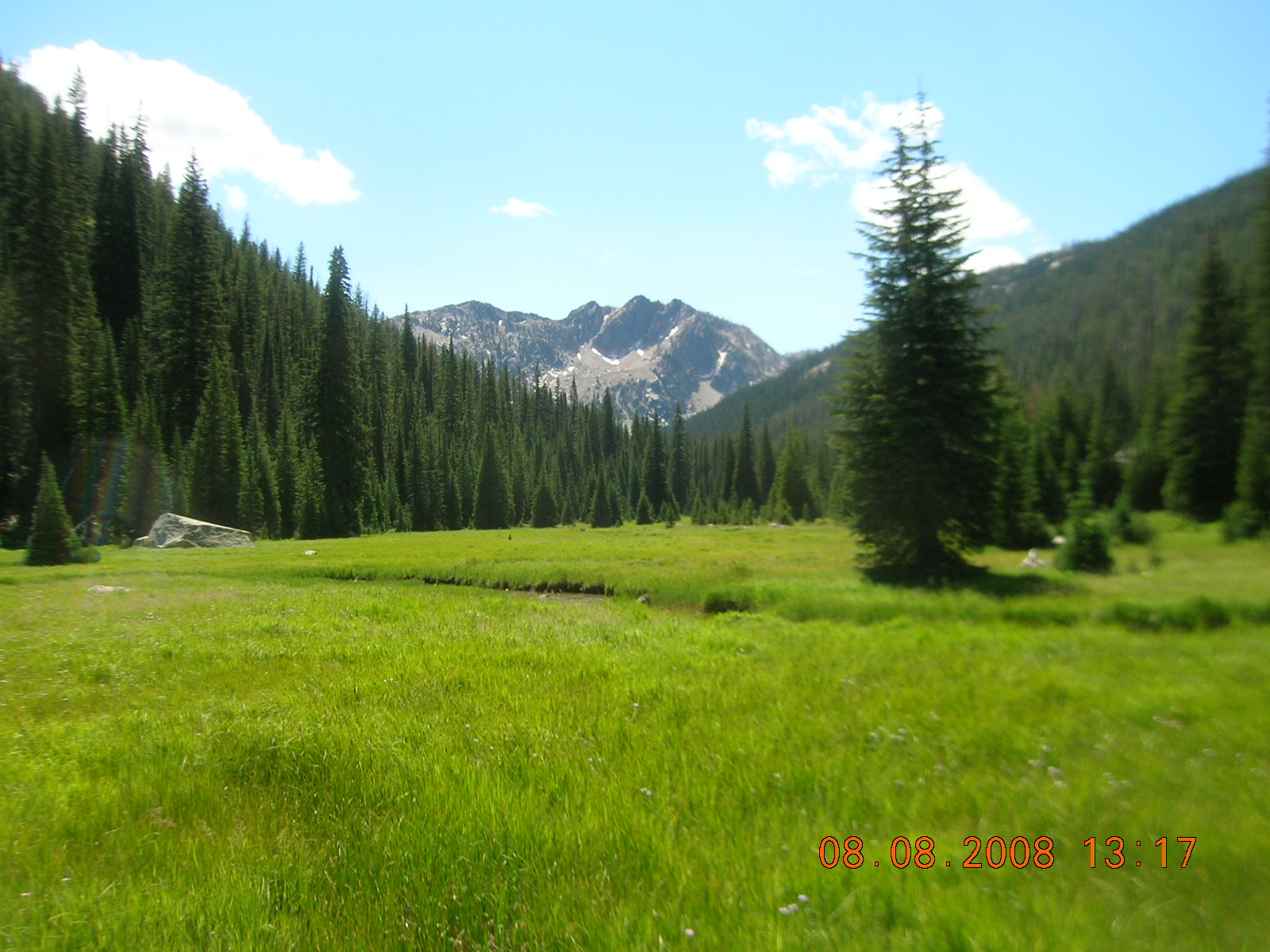
Falls Creek Valley

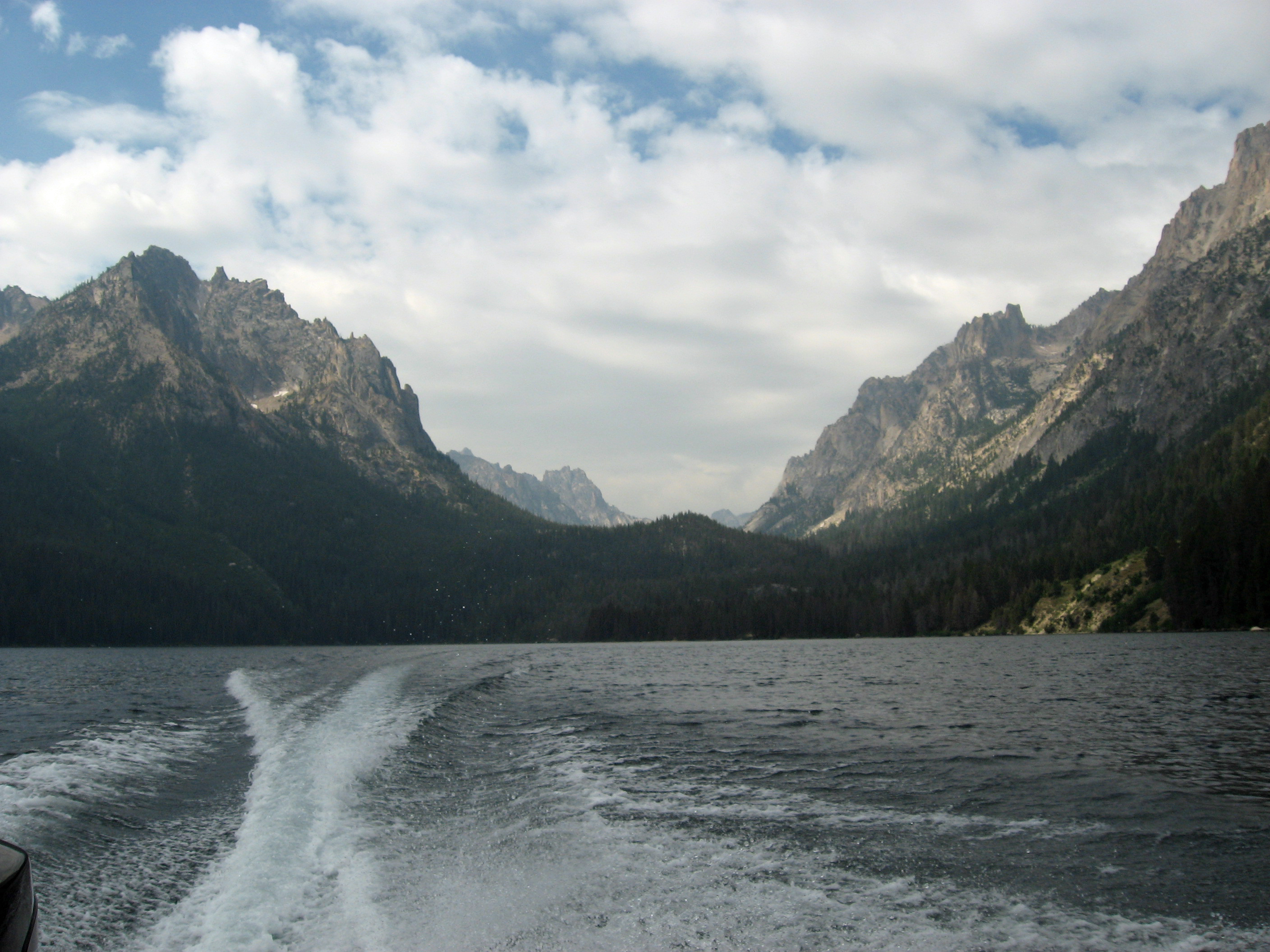
The SW end of Redfish Lake (Redfish Lake Creek Canyon)

== See also ==
- Lakes of the Sawtooth Mountains (Idaho)
- Sawtooth National Forest
- Sawtooth Range (Idaho)
