= Perkins Lake =

Lake in Blaine County, Idaho, United States

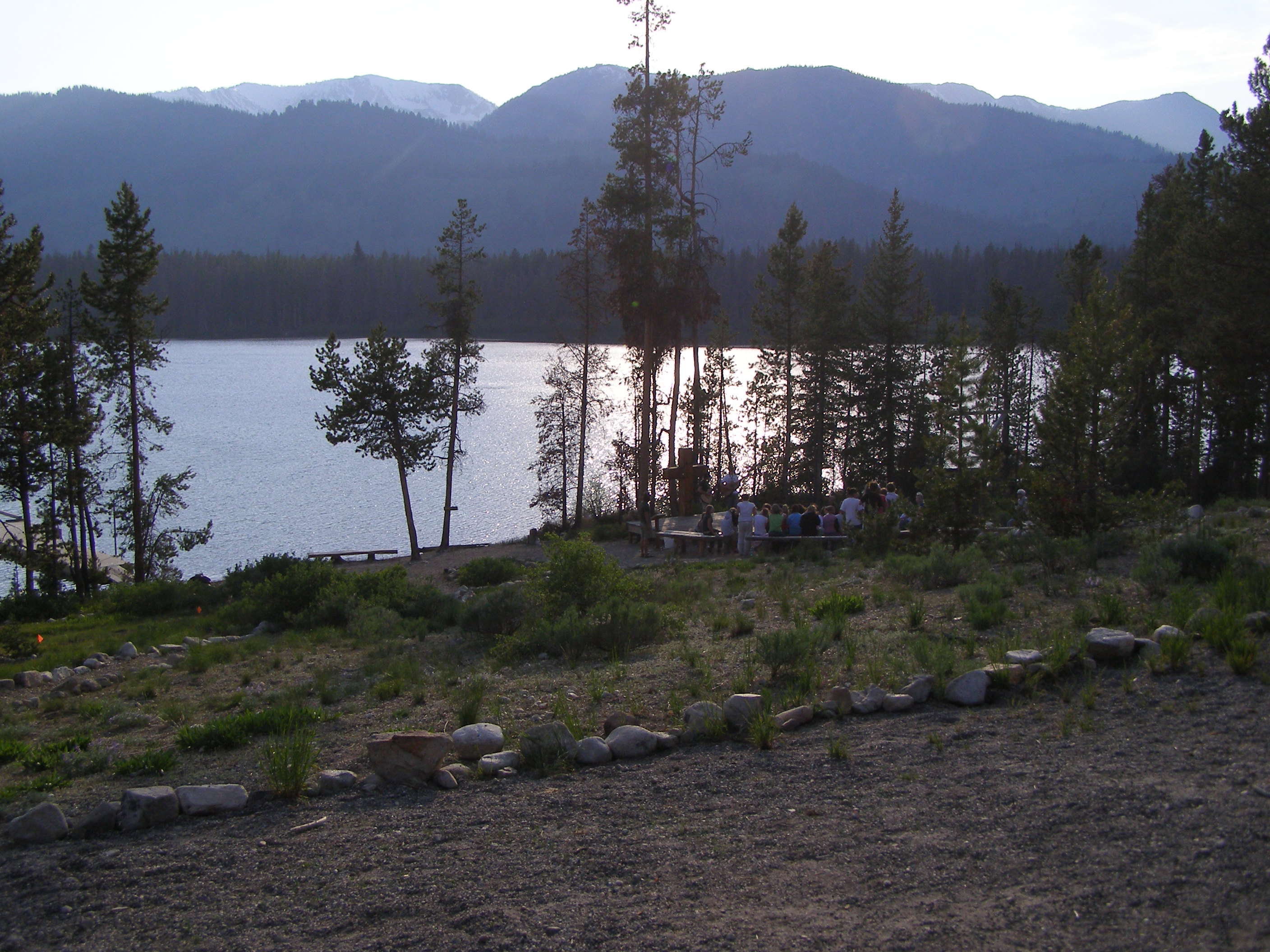
- Perkins Lake

- Location within Idaho Location within the United States
- Location: Blaine County, Idaho
- Coordinates: 43°55′43″N 114°50′25″W
- Type: Glacial
- Primary inflows: Alturas Lake Creek
- Primary outflows: Alturas Lake Creek to Salmon River
- Basin countries: United States
- Max. length: 0.39 mi (0.63 km)
- Max. width: 0.24 mi (0.39 km)
- Surface elevation: 7,016 ft (2,138 m)

Perkins Lake is an alpine lake in Blaine County, Idaho, United States, located in the Sawtooth Valley in the Sawtooth National Recreation Area. The lake is approximately 21 miles (34 km) south of Stanley and 30 miles (48 km) northwest of Ketchum. Perkins Lake can be accessed from State Highway 75 via Sawtooth National Forest road 205.

In the southern section of the Sawtooth Valley, Perkins Lake has easy access around its northern shore, several campgrounds, and private camps. Camp Perkins, a Lutheran Outdoor Ministries camp is located on the northeast shore of Perkins Lake.

== See also ==
- Alturas Lake
- List of lakes of the Sawtooth Mountains (Idaho)
- Sawtooth National Forest
- Sawtooth National Recreation Area
- Sawtooth Range (Idaho)
