= Upper Hanson Lake =

Alpine lake in the state of Idaho

- Location within Idaho Location within the United States
- Location: Custer County, Idaho
- Coordinates: 44.210444°N 115.123067°W
- Type: Glacial
- Primary outflows: Creek to Stanley Lake Creek to Salmon River
- Basin countries: United States
- Max. length: 0.21 mi (0.34 km)
- Max. width: 0.04 mi (0.064 km)
- Surface elevation: 8,520 ft (2,600 m)

Upper Hanson Lake is an alpine lake in Custer County, Idaho, United States, located in the Sawtooth Mountains in the Sawtooth National Recreation Area. The lake is approximately 8.7 miles (14.0 km) west of Stanley. Upper Hanson Lake is accessed via Sawtooth National Forest trail 640 from the Stanley Lake trailhead on forest service road 455 from State Highway 21.

Upper Hanson Lake is the smallest of the three Hanson Lakes. Lower and Middle Hanson Lakes are a short distance downhill from Upper Hanson Lake. The stream that drains the Hanson Lakes goes over Bridal Veil Falls before flowing into Stanley Lake Creek.

== See also ==
- List of lakes of the Sawtooth Mountains (Idaho)
- Sawtooth National Forest
- Sawtooth National Recreation Area
- Sawtooth Range (Idaho)
