= Boat Box Hot Spring =

Thermal spring and recreation area

- Elkhorn Hot Spring
- Interactive map of Boat Box Hot Spring
- Location: Custer County, Idaho, United States
- Coordinates: 44.2448°N 114.8859°W
- Elevation: 6,100 feet (1,900 m)
- Type: Geothermal
- Discharge: 168 liters per minute
- Temperature: Source: 136 °F (58 °C); Soaking pool: 110 °F (43 °C)

Boat Box Hot Spring, also known as Elkhorn Hot Spring, is a hot spring located along the Salmon River in the Sawtooth National Forest on Idaho State Highway 75, about 3 miles away from the town of Stanley, Idaho. The hot spring is composed of a single metal tub that is fed through a plastic tube built into the riverbank. The spring is named for the historical wooden tub that was used before it was destroyed by annual spring flooding. The average temperature of Boat Box Hot Spring is usually around 110 °F (43.33 °C). The water is usually not clear, as algae inhabit its waters.

== Location ==
The hot spring can be accessed between mileposts 192 and 193 on a gravel turnout. Since the spring is on the edge of the highway, visitors only have to travel a short distance over sand and gravel before reaching the hot pool.

The hot spring is open year-round, but has a limited capacity of only three to four people due to its limited size. Visitors do not usually skinny dip, due to its proximity to the highway.

The spring and soaking pool are located at the edge of the Salmon River. The Sawtooth National Forest is visible from the site. Local flora and fauna include subalpine fir, the Engelmann spruce, the Douglas fir, alders, willows, tufted hairgrass, reedgrass, and bluegrass. Local fauna include moose, minks, osprey, spotted sandpiper, sparrows, blackbirds, sockeye salmon, steelhead salmon, rainbow trout, and bull trout.

== Water profile ==
The hot spring water emerges from the source at 136 °F (58 °C) and cools to a temperature of 110 °F (43 °C) in the soaking pool. The spring water contains elevated levels of silicon dioxide (72.6 mg/L), sodium (70.4 mg/L) and bicarbonate (64.7 mg/L). The pH has been measured between 8.2 and 9.4. The discharge rate is 168 liters per minute.

== Climate ==
Though Boat Box Hot Spring is accessible throughout the entire year, heavy snowfall typical in the Rocky Mountains of central Idaho may cause dangerous road conditions, which can impede accessibility to the hot spring.

Climate data for Stanley, Idaho, 1981–2010 normals
| Month | Jan | Feb | Mar | Apr | May | Jun | Jul | Aug | Sep | Oct | Nov | Dec | Year |
|---|---|---|---|---|---|---|---|---|---|---|---|---|---|
| Mean daily maximum °F (°C) | 25.8 (−3.4) | 32.8 (0.4) | 43.3 (6.3) | 50.5 (10.3) | 60.0 (15.6) | 68.6 (20.3) | 79.1 (26.2) | 78.8 (26.0) | 69.4 (20.8) | 56.2 (13.4) | 37.8 (3.2) | 24.4 (−4.2) | 52.2 (11.2) |
| Mean daily minimum °F (°C) | −1.7 (−18.7) | −1.1 (−18.4) | 9.8 (−12.3) | 19.4 (−7.0) | 27.4 (−2.6) | 33.1 (0.6) | 35.7 (2.1) | 33.4 (0.8) | 26.4 (−3.1) | 20.1 (−6.6) | 10.8 (−11.8) | −1.8 (−18.8) | 17.6 (−8.0) |
| Average precipitation inches (mm) | 1.28 (33) | 1.44 (37) | 1.18 (30) | 1.01 (26) | 0.91 (23) | 0.87 (22) | 0.47 (12) | 0.40 (10) | 0.44 (11) | 0.84 (21) | 1.68 (43) | 1.73 (44) | 12.25 (312) |
| Average snowfall inches (cm) | 17.4 (44) | 13.0 (33) | 9.9 (25) | 3.4 (8.6) | 0.9 (2.3) | 0.2 (0.51) | 0.0 (0.0) | 0.0 (0.0) | 0.4 (1.0) | 1.7 (4.3) | 10.6 (27) | 14.6 (37) | 72.1 (182.71) |
Source: WRCC
