= Alturas Lake =

Alpine lake in the state of Idaho

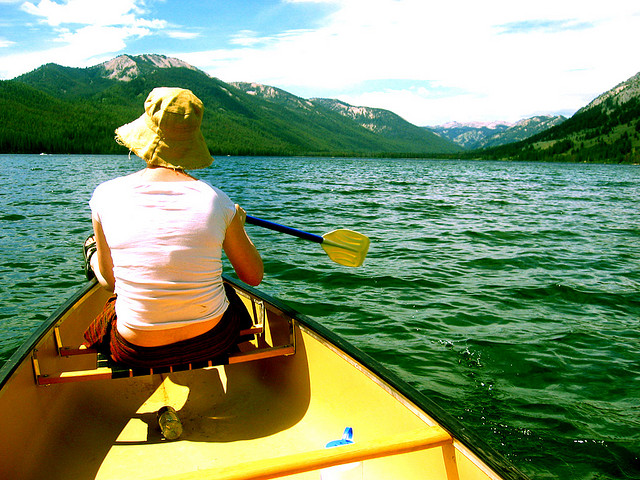
- Paddling on Alturas Lake

- Location within Idaho Location within the United States
- Location: Blaine County, Idaho
- Coordinates: 43.913517°N 114.860569°W
- Type: Glacial
- Primary inflows: Alturas Lake Creek
- Primary outflows: Alturas Lake Creek to Salmon River
- Basin countries: United States
- Max. length: 1.95 mi (3.14 km)
- Max. width: 0.80 mi (1.29 km)
- Surface elevation: 7,016 ft (2,138 m)

Alturas Lake is an alpine lake in Blaine County, Idaho, United States, in the Sawtooth Valley in the Sawtooth National Recreation Area. The lake is approximately 21 miles (34 km) south of Stanley and 30 miles (48 km) northwest of Ketchum. Alturas Lake can be accessed from State Highway 75 via Sawtooth National Forest road 205.

In the southern section of the Sawtooth Valley, Alturas Lake is the second largest lake in Sawtooth National Recreation Area and has easy access around its northern shore, several campgrounds, and private camps. Leah Lake and Logjam Lake are upstream of Alturas Lake.

The lake took its name from the now-defunct Alturas County, Idaho.

== See also ==
- Perkins Lake
- List of lakes of the Sawtooth Mountains (Idaho)
- Sawtooth National Forest
- Sawtooth National Recreation Area
- Sawtooth Range (Idaho)
