= Mores Creek Summit =

- Location within the United States Location within Idaho
- Elevation: 6,118 ft (1,865 m)
- Traversed by: SH-21

Third Approach
- Location: Boise County, Idaho, US
- Range: Boise Mountains, Central Idaho Mountains
- Coordinates: 43°55′55.5″N 115°40′5″W
- Topo map: caltopo map

Mores Creek Summit is a mountain pass in the western United States in southwest Idaho, at an elevation of 6,118 feet (1,865 m) above sea level. Traversed by State Highway 21, the Ponderosa Pine Scenic Byway, it is located in Boise County in the Boise National Forest.

Mores Creek Summit marks the divide between the Boise River (north fork) and Payette River (south fork) drainage areas. The summit is northeast of Idaho City and southwest of Lowman.

Mores Creek is a tributary of the Boise River.
