= Lowman, Idaho =

Census-designated place in Boise County, Idaho, United States

Coordinates: 44°04′43″N 115°37′28″W

Location in the United States

Lowman is a small rural census-designated place in Boise County, Idaho, United States. It is nestled along the north bank of the South Fork of the Payette River in the central part of the state, at an elevation of 3,960 feet (1,210 m) above sea level. As of the 2020 census, its population was 44.

== History ==
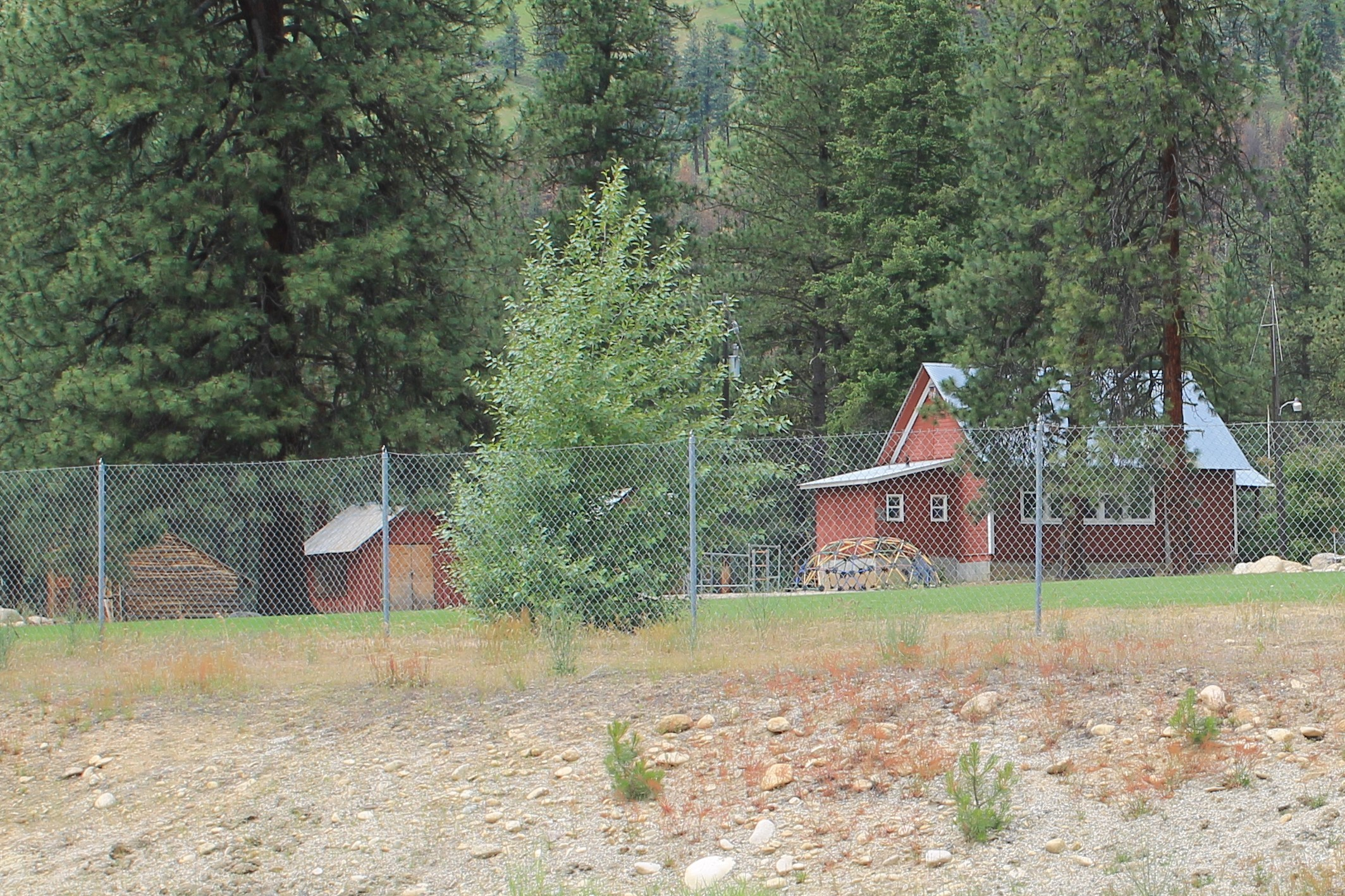
Lowman Schoolhouse and Yard, June 2017

Location in Idaho

The community was named for a homesteader, Nathaniel Winfield Lowman, from Polk County, Iowa, who settled there in 1907.

Lowman is notable for having a one-room school, one of only a couple hundred still in use in the United States.

A devastating wildfire ravaged the area around Lowman 37 years ago in 1989; it destroyed over 45,000 acres (70 mi^{2}; 180 km^{2}) and 26 structures, but without injuries or fatalities.

== Geography ==
Eighty miles (130 km) from Boise on State Highway 21, the "Ponderosa Pine Scenic Byway," Lowman is at the junction with the 33-mile (53 km) "Banks-Lowman Highway"; now designated Highway 2512A. It is the "Wildlife Canyon Scenic Byway," which heads west and descends nearly one thousand vertical feet (300 m) with the whitewater of the South Fork to its confluence with the North Fork at Banks, the junction with State Highway 55, the "Payette River Scenic Byway."

The "Highway to Heaven" trail, stretching more than 150 miles (240 km) from Idaho's capital of Boise, is the only mountain passage in the West that begins from a major city. The trail winds from 8th Street in Boise and climbs the Boise River, past the Lucky Peak Dam. Sagebrush gives way to gentle pine slopes leading to historic Idaho City, then over Mores Creek Summit at 6,117 ft (1,864 m). The road descends over one thousand vertical feet (300 m) then climbs to Beaver Creek Summit (6,041 ft (1,841 m)) and switches back down to Lowman. The route then climbs with the South Fork of the Payette River up and over Banner Summit at 7,056 ft (2,151 m) to Stanley, where it meets State Highway 75, just northeast of the Sawtooths.

Lowman is in a geothermally active region; natural hot springs surface in the middle of the community as well as in many other places in the surrounding mountains.

Lowman has an area of 2.078 square miles (5.38 km^{2}); 2.039 square miles (5.28 km^{2}) is land, and 0.039 square miles (0.10 km^{2}) is water

== Climate ==
This climatic region is typified by large seasonal temperature differences, with warm to hot (and often humid) summers and cold (sometimes severely cold) winters. According to the Köppen Climate Classification system, Lowman has a humid continental climate, abbreviated "Dfb" on climate maps.

== Demographics ==
Historical population
Census	Pop.	Note	%±
2000	38		—
2010	42		10.5%
2020	44		4.8%
U.S. Decennial Census

== Transportation ==
- - SH-21 - to Idaho City and Boise (south) and Stanley (north)

== Notable residents ==
- Gordon Bess, cartoonist of Redeye
- Robin Fontes returned to Idaho after a military career, retired a Major General

== See also ==
- List of census-designated places in Idaho
