= Banner Creek Summit =

- Location within the United States Location within Idaho
- Elevation: 7,037 ft (2,145 m)
- Traversed by: SH-21

Third Approach
- Location: Boise County / Custer County, Idaho, U.S.
- Range: Salmon River Mountains
- Coordinates: 44°18′26″N 115°14′00″W
- Topo map: USGS Banner Summit

Banner Creek Summit is a mountain pass in the western United States in central Idaho, at an elevation of 7,037 feet (2,145 m) above sea level. Traversed by State Highway 21, the Ponderosa Pine Scenic Byway, it is located on the border of Custer County and Boise County, also the border of the Challis and Boise National Forests, immediately northwest of the Sawtooth Range.

Banner Creek Summit also marks the divide between the Salmon River and Payette River drainage areas. The highway follows Banner Creek, a tributary of the Middle Fork of the Salmon River, on the north side of the summit, and Canyon Creek (South Fork - Payette River) on the south side.

In road distance, the summit is about midway between Stanley and Lowman. This section of SH-21 is usually not maintained during the winter months, due to light traffic and heavy snowfall.

== Climate ==
Climate data for Banner Summit, Idaho, 1991–2020 normals: 7040ft (2146m)
Month	Jan	Feb	Mar	Apr	May	Jun	Jul	Aug	Sep	Oct	Nov	Dec	Year
Mean daily maximum °F (°C)	33.2 (0.7)	37.7 (3.2)	44.2 (6.8)	49.3 (9.6)	57.1 (13.9)	64.1 (17.8)	75.9 (24.4)	75.2 (24.0)	66.2 (19.0)	51.9 (11.1)	38.5 (3.6)	30.4 (−0.9)	52.0 (11.1)
Daily mean °F (°C)	22.2 (−5.4)	24.7 (−4.1)	30.2 (−1.0)	35.4 (1.9)	43.2 (6.2)	49.5 (9.7)	58.7 (14.8)	57.8 (14.3)	50.3 (10.2)	39.1 (3.9)	27.6 (−2.4)	20.4 (−6.4)	38.3 (3.5)
Mean daily minimum °F (°C)	11.1 (−11.6)	11.7 (−11.3)	16.1 (−8.8)	21.5 (−5.8)	29.2 (−1.6)	34.9 (1.6)	41.4 (5.2)	40.3 (4.6)	34.2 (1.2)	26.3 (−3.2)	16.7 (−8.5)	10.3 (−12.1)	24.5 (−4.2)
Average precipitation inches (mm)	5.65 (144)	4.60 (117)	5.07 (129)	3.76 (96)	2.76 (70)	2.38 (60)	0.73 (19)	0.75 (19)	1.39 (35)	2.74 (70)	4.84 (123)	6.72 (171)	41.39 (1,053)
Source 1: XMACIS2
Source 2: NOAA (Precipitation)
