= Mores Creek =

Stream in Idaho, U.S.

Coordinates: 43°35′19″N 115°59′21″W

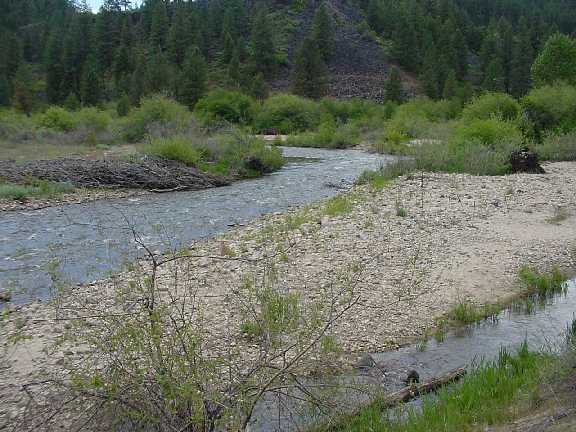
Mores Creek

Mores Creek is a stream in the U.S. state of Idaho. It is a tributary to the Boise River.

The stream is named after J. Marion More, a businessperson in the local mining industry. Variant names are "Moore Creek" and "Moores Creek".

== See also ==
- Mores Creek Summit
