= Galena Summit =

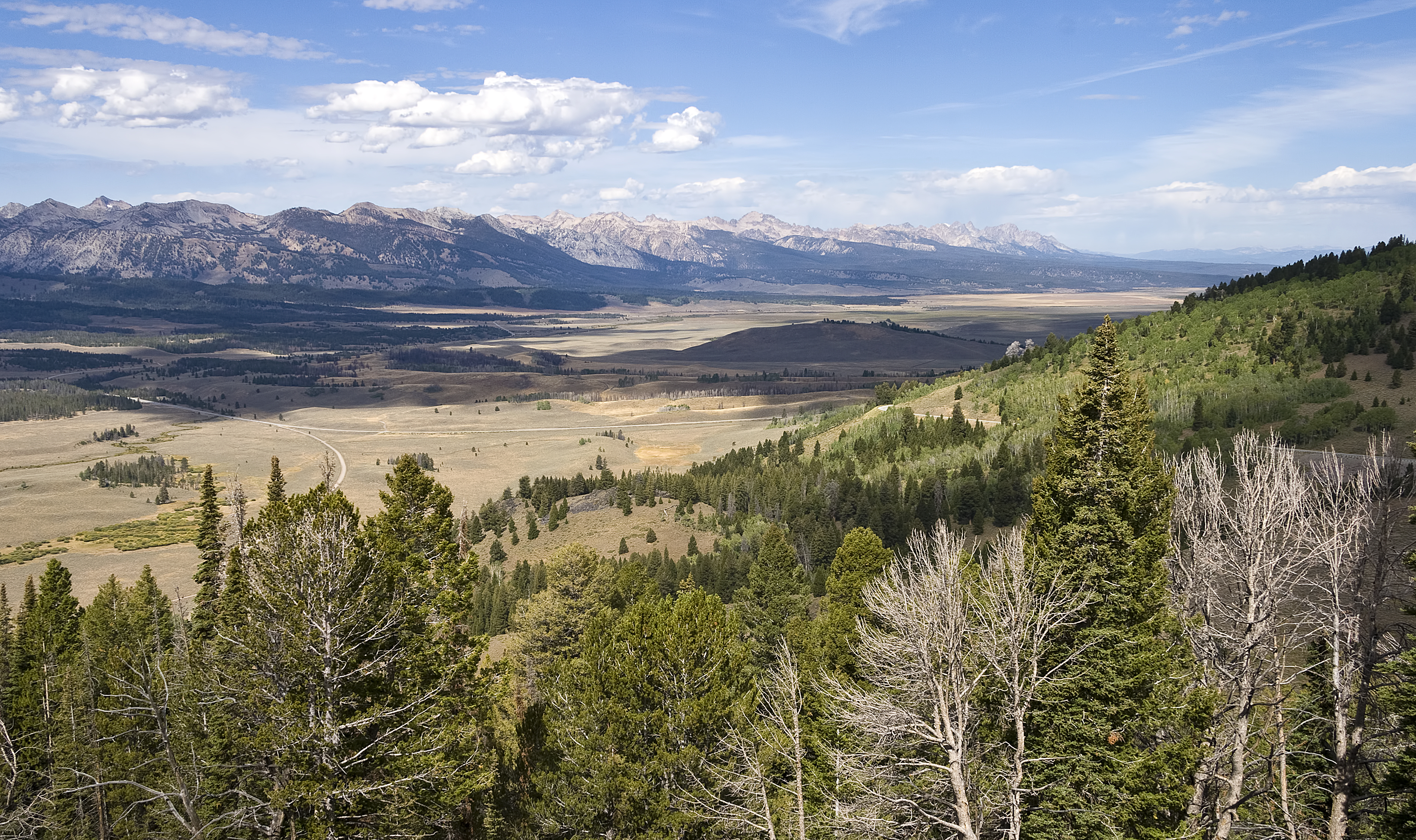
- Sawtooth Valley from the overlook below Galena Summit

- Location within the United States Location within Idaho
- Elevation: 8,701 ft (2,652 m)
- Traversed by: SH-75

Third Approach
- Location: Blaine County, Idaho, U.S.
- Range: Boulder Mountains; Rocky Mountains
- Coordinates: 43°52′12″N 114°42′47″W

Galena Summit is a high mountain pass in the western United States in central Idaho, at an elevation of 8,701 feet (2,652 m) above sea level. The pass is located in the Boulder Mountains, in the northwest corner of Blaine County, within the Sawtooth National Recreation Area of the Sawtooth National Forest.

The summit is on State Highway 75, the Sawtooth Scenic Byway, and is 29 miles (47 km) northwest of Ketchum and the Sun Valley ski resort. It is the highest summit of a highway in the Northwest. Prior to 1977, Highway 75 was designated U.S. Route 93, which is now to the east on the former U.S. 93 alternate, through Arco and the Lost River Valley.

Galena Summit marks the divide between the Big Wood River and Salmon River drainage areas. A little more than one mile (1.6 km) west of the summit is Galena Overlook, a scenic viewpoint at 8,400 feet (2,560 m). It offers views of the Sawtooth range to the northwest and the headwaters of the Salmon River in the Stanley Basin of Custer County, which Highway 75 follows north to Obsidian and Stanley, then east and north towards Challis. The overlook facilities were originally opened in 1964, renamed in 2006 for Frank and Bethine Church, and renovated in 2010.

The Galena Lodge (in historic Galena) is at 7,290 feet (2,220 m), on the Ketchum side of the summit, and hosts cross country skiing. Collegiate alpine ski races were held on the summit in late 1947, due to a lack of snow at Sun Valley, and supplies were dropped in by airplane. The Ore-Ida Women's Challenge bicycle race (1984–2002) had a stage that crested the summit.

Galena is a mineral, lead sulfide, an important lead ore; deposits of galena often contain silver.

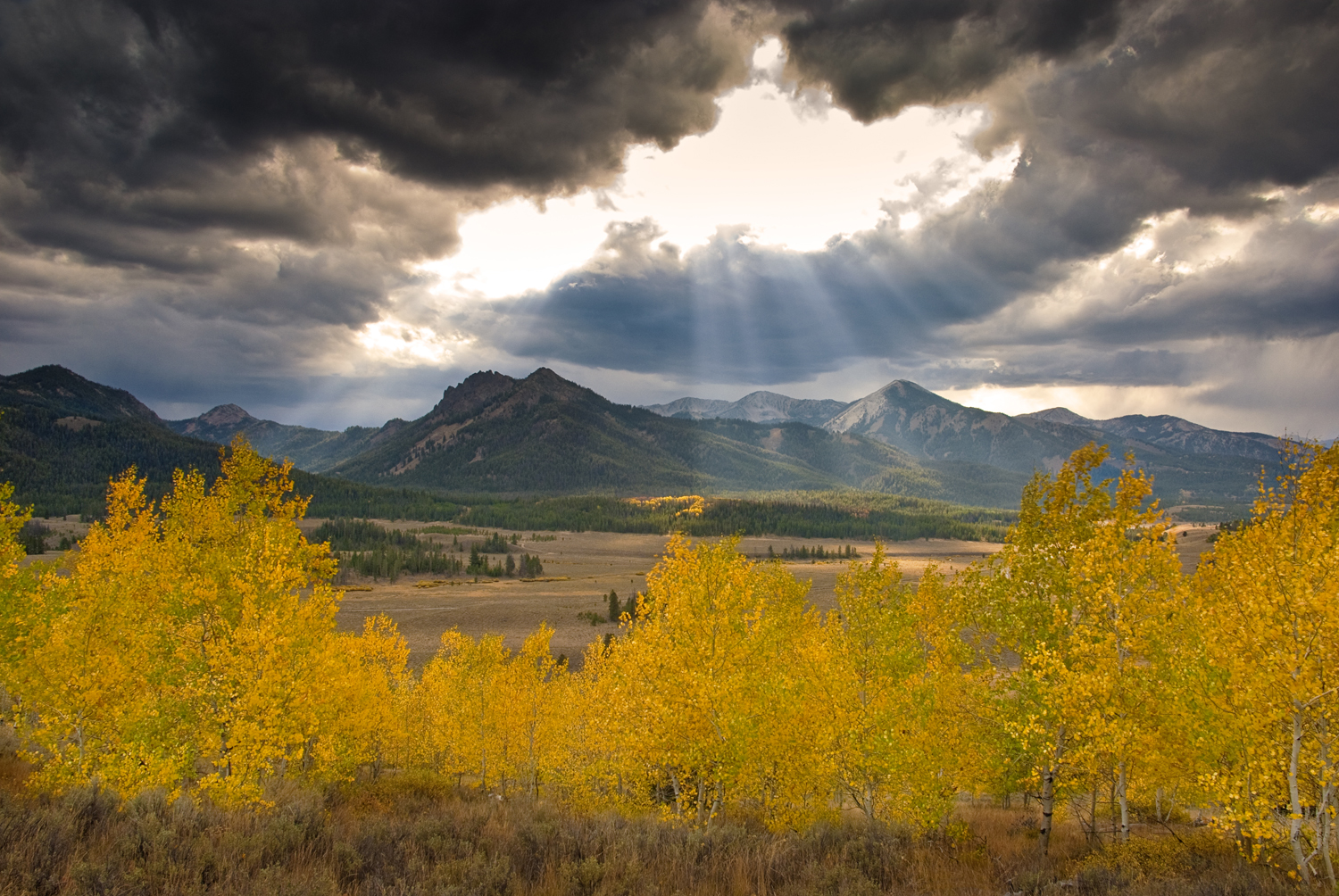
Galena Summit area in October 2011

== Climate ==
Climate data for Galena Summit, Idaho, 1991–2020 normals: 8780ft (2676m)
Month	Jan	Feb	Mar	Apr	May	Jun	Jul	Aug	Sep	Oct	Nov	Dec	Year
Mean daily maximum °F (°C)	27.3 (−2.6)	29.8 (−1.2)	37.1 (2.8)	43.5 (6.4)	52.0 (11.1)	59.3 (15.2)	70.1 (21.2)	69.1 (20.6)	59.7 (15.4)	45.5 (7.5)	32.4 (0.2)	25.1 (−3.8)	45.9 (7.7)
Daily mean °F (°C)	19.9 (−6.7)	20.9 (−6.2)	26.4 (−3.1)	32.0 (0.0)	40.8 (4.9)	47.8 (8.8)	57.7 (14.3)	56.9 (13.8)	48.7 (9.3)	36.4 (2.4)	24.9 (−3.9)	18.3 (−7.6)	35.9 (2.2)
Mean daily minimum °F (°C)	12.6 (−10.8)	12.0 (−11.1)	15.8 (−9.0)	20.5 (−6.4)	29.6 (−1.3)	36.4 (2.4)	45.2 (7.3)	44.6 (7.0)	37.5 (3.1)	27.2 (−2.7)	17.3 (−8.2)	11.4 (−11.4)	25.8 (−3.4)
Average precipitation inches (mm)	3.66 (93)	3.34 (85)	3.57 (91)	2.72 (69)	2.56 (65)	2.05 (52)	0.76 (19)	0.65 (17)	1.36 (35)	2.22 (56)	2.96 (75)	4.37 (111)	30.22 (768)
Source 1: XMACIS2
Source 2: NOAA (Precipitation)

Climate data for Galena, Idaho, 1991–2020 normals: 7470ft (2277m)
Month	Jan	Feb	Mar	Apr	May	Jun	Jul	Aug	Sep	Oct	Nov	Dec	Year
Mean daily maximum °F (°C)	32.8 (0.4)	37.2 (2.9)	44.3 (6.8)	49.6 (9.8)	57.8 (14.3)	66.6 (19.2)	78.2 (25.7)	76.7 (24.8)	67.3 (19.6)	53.2 (11.8)	38.6 (3.7)	30.2 (−1.0)	52.7 (11.5)
Daily mean °F (°C)	20.6 (−6.3)	22.8 (−5.1)	29.0 (−1.7)	35.1 (1.7)	43.1 (6.2)	50.1 (10.1)	58.6 (14.8)	57.3 (14.1)	49.8 (9.9)	38.9 (3.8)	26.3 (−3.2)	18.8 (−7.3)	37.5 (3.1)
Mean daily minimum °F (°C)	8.4 (−13.1)	8.4 (−13.1)	13.6 (−10.2)	20.4 (−6.4)	28.2 (−2.1)	33.5 (0.8)	39.1 (3.9)	37.8 (3.2)	32.1 (0.1)	24.7 (−4.1)	14.0 (−10.0)	7.5 (−13.6)	22.3 (−5.4)
Average precipitation inches (mm)	3.41 (87)	2.92 (74)	2.85 (72)	1.98 (50)	2.19 (56)	1.94 (49)	0.74 (19)	0.63 (16)	1.23 (31)	1.84 (47)	2.75 (70)	4.40 (112)	26.88 (683)
Source 1: XMACIS2
Source 2: NOAA (Precipitation)
