= Leah Lake =

Alpine lake in the state of Idaho

- Location within Idaho Location within the United States
- Location: Blaine County, Idaho
- Coordinates: 43°54′27″N 114°58′24″W
- Type: Glacial
- Primary inflows: Alpine Creek
- Primary outflows: Alpine Creek to Alturas Lake Creek to Salmon River
- Basin countries: United States
- Max. length: 0.43 mi (0.69 km)
- Max. width: 0.17 mi (0.27 km)
- Surface elevation: 8,535 ft (2,601 m)

Leah Lake is a small alpine lake in Blaine County, Idaho, United States, located in the Sawtooth Mountains in the Sawtooth National Recreation Area. There are no trails leading to the lake or the Alpine Creek drainage.

Leah Lake is in the Sawtooth Wilderness; a wilderness permit can be obtained at a registration box at trailheads or wilderness boundaries. Logjam Lake is upstream of Leah Lake while Alturas Lake is downstream.

== See also ==
- List of lakes of the Sawtooth Mountains (Idaho)
- Sawtooth National Forest
- Sawtooth National Recreation Area
- Sawtooth Range (Idaho)
