= Central Idaho Dark Sky Reserve =

Dark-sky preserve in Idaho, USA

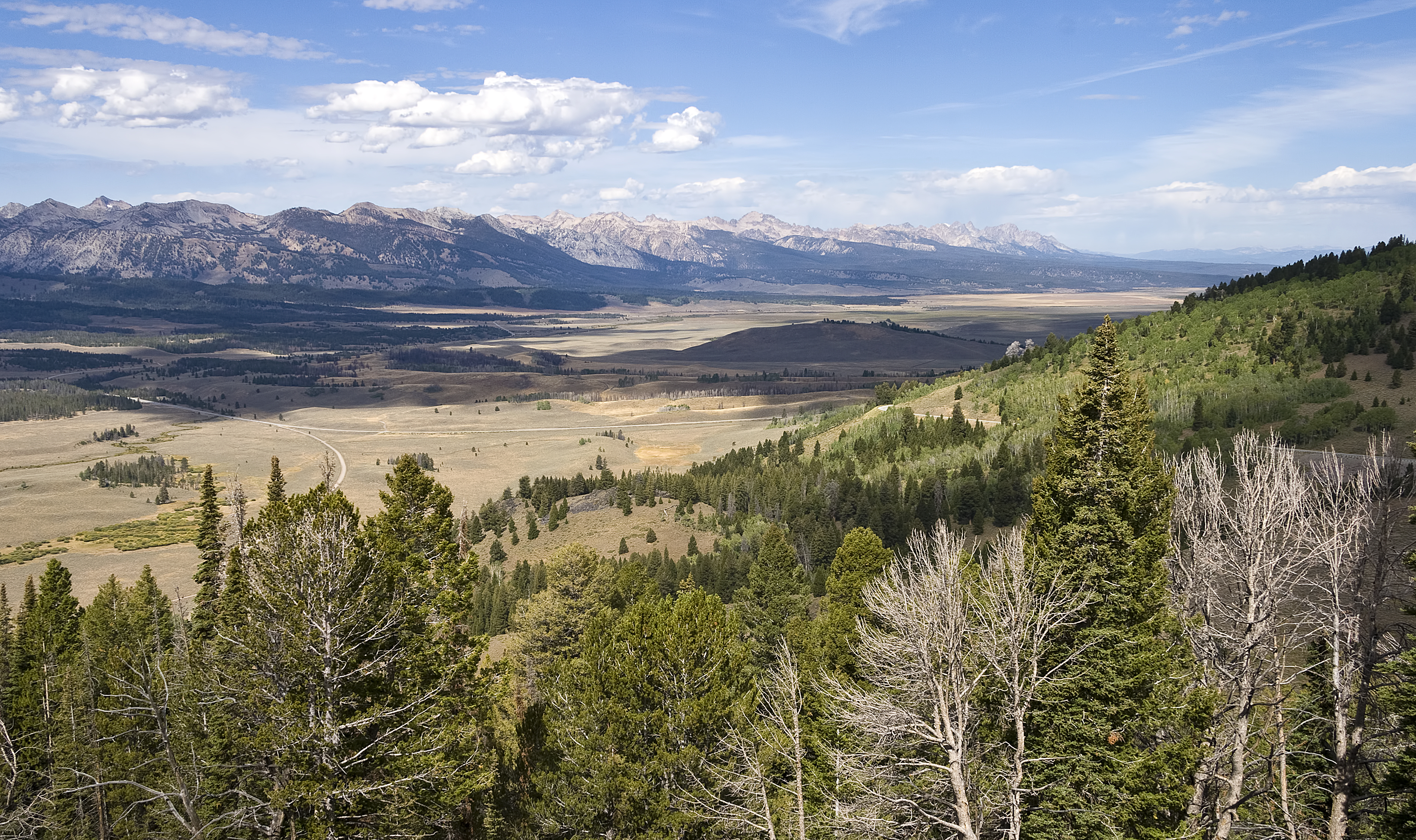
- Sawtooth Valley

- Location within Idaho
- Location: In and around Sawtooth National Recreation Area
- Nearest city: Ketchum, Idaho, United States
- Coordinates: 44°0′N 114°50′W
- Area: 1,416 sq mi (3,670 km^{2})
- Established: 2017
- Website: idahodarksky.org

The Central Idaho Dark Sky Reserve is a 1,416-square-mile (3,670 km^{2}) dark-sky preserve near the Sawtooth National Recreation Area, in the U.S. state of Idaho. It was designated on December 18, 2017, and is the first gold-tier dark sky preserve in the United States. The area was designated by International Dark-Sky Association. The area includes the city of Ketchum, Idaho which was separately designated a "Dark Sky Community" in 2017. Idaho State Highway 75 in the Sawtooth Valley between Redfish Lake and Pettit Lake roughly traverses the reserve's "core areas". Several sky quality meters are installed along State Highway 75 in this area.

Local communities and federal authorities collaborated in the designation; the governments will take measures such as shielding street lights to preserve the area's dark sky; Ketchum has had a dark sky ordinance since 1999, and Sun Valley, also in the reserve, has its own local ordinance. The U.S. Forest Service, which manages much of the land in the area, will post informational signs about the dark sky reserve, and has said it will reduce light pollution from its buildings; compliance by individuals on Forest Service land will be voluntary.

Another dark sky certification effort was under way in 2017 about 80 miles (130 km) away at Bruneau Dunes State Park, which hosts a public astronomical observatory.
