= Idaho City, Idaho =

- City
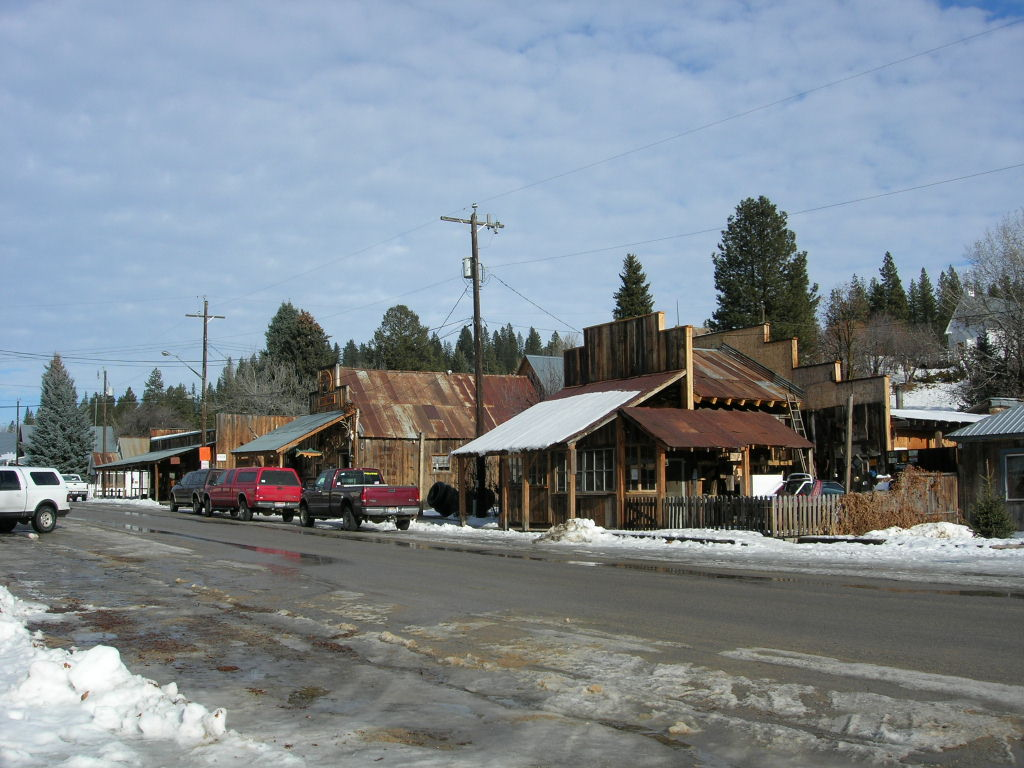
- Main Street from southwest in 2005

- Location of Idaho City in Boise County, Idaho.

- Location within the United States Location within Idaho
- Coordinates: 43°49′43″N 115°49′56″W
- Country: United States
- State: Idaho
- County: Boise

Area
  - Total: 0.67 sq mi (1.73 km^{2})
  - Land: 0.66 sq mi (1.72 km^{2})
  - Water: 0 sq mi (0.00 km^{2})
- Elevation: 3,986 ft (1,215 m)

Population (2020)
  - Total: 466
  - Density: 702.2/sq mi (271.13/km^{2})
- Time zone: UTC-7 (Mountain (MST))
  - Summer (DST): UTC-6 (MDT)
- ZIP code: 83631
- Area codes: 208, 986
- FIPS code: 16-39610
- GNIS feature ID: 2410090
- Website: idahocity.municipalimpact.com

Idaho City is an historic mining town in the western United States and the county seat of Boise County, Idaho. Located about 36 miles (58 km) northeast of Boise, its population was 466 at the 2020 census.

Part of the Boise metropolitan area, Idaho City is adjacent to State Highway 21 (Ponderosa Pine Scenic Byway), its elevation is 3,988 feet (1,216 m) above sea level.

== History ==
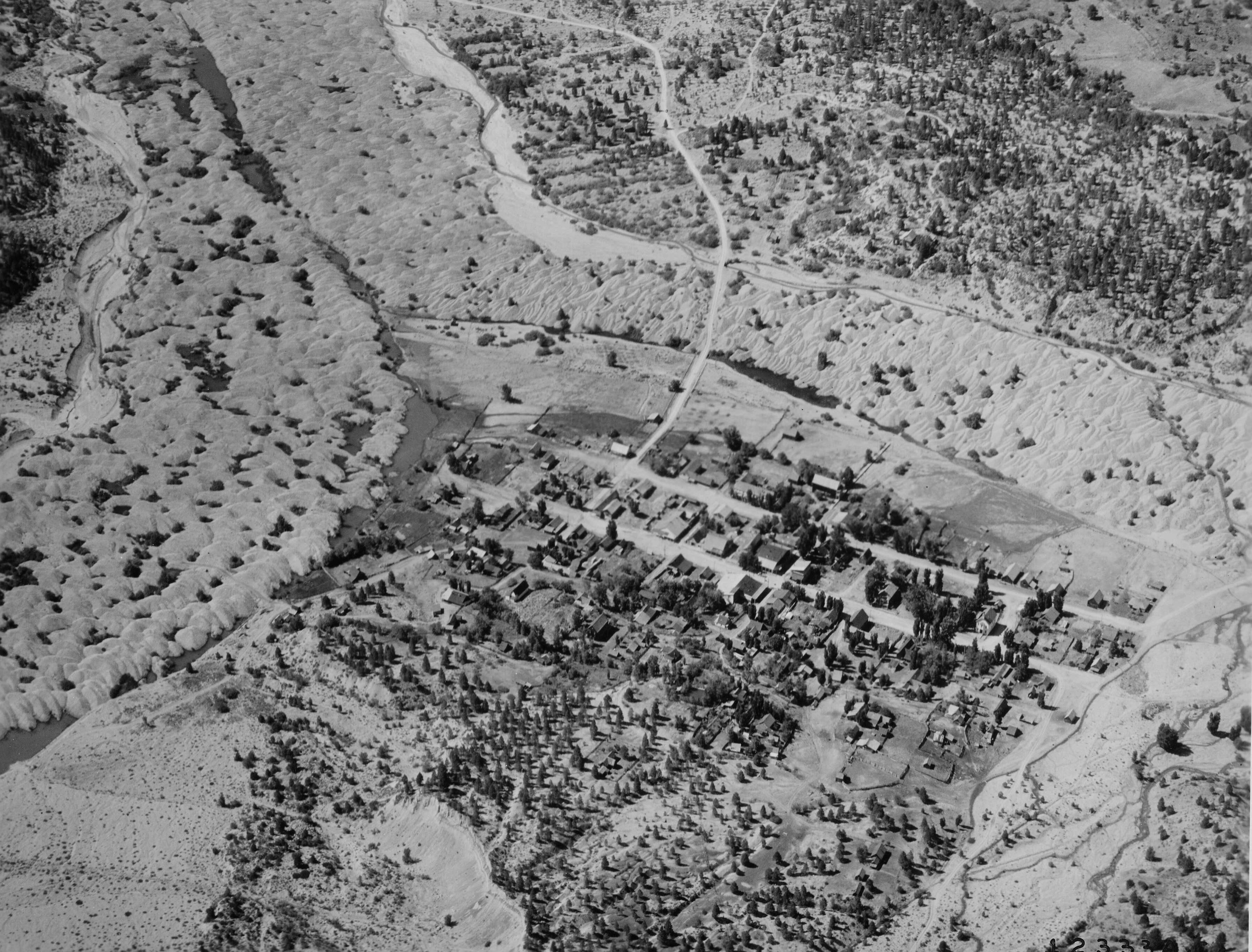
Idaho City, 1925

Idaho City was founded in December 1862 as “Bannock” (sometimes given as “West Bannock”), amidst the Boise Basin gold rush during the Civil War, the largest since the California gold rush a dozen years earlier. Near the confluence of Elk and Mores Creeks, its plentiful water supply allowed it to outgrow the other nearby camps in the basin, such as Placerville, Pioneerville, and Centerville. As its population swelled, the new Idaho Territorial legislature changed the town's name to “Idaho City,” to avoid confusion with Bannack, in present-day Beaverhead County, the southwestern corner of Montana.

At its peak during the mid-1860s, there were more than 200 businesses in town, including three dozen saloons and two dozen law offices. Its 1864 population of 7,000 made it the largest city in the Northwest, bigger than Portland. Wood was the prime source of both shelter and heat, which caused Idaho City to burn four times: 1865, 1867, 1868, and 1871. Five businesses on Main Street burned again in the early hours of June 5, 2015.

In 1863, St. Joseph's Catholic Church was established; it was the first Catholic parish in the new Idaho Territory and the church was completed the following year.

Idaho City is an important location in local Masonic history. The Grand Lodge of Idaho was founded in Idaho City in 1867. Idaho Lodge No. 1 was originally located in Idaho City, but is now in Boise.

During the boom, the greater Boise Basin population numbered in the tens of thousands, but most departed the mountains once mining declined. Idaho City's population fell below 900 by 1870 and was down to 104 by 1920. The modern economy relies mainly on hunting and fishing tourism, and visits to the many historic sites, including the Boot Hill Cemetery. Outside of town, the mining tailings of the era are ubiquitous.

In his fourth term as a U.S. Senator, Frank Church announced his candidacy for the Democratic nomination for president from the porch of the county courthouse in Idaho City in March 1976. His grandfather had settled there in 1871 and his father was born there in 1889. Chase Clark, Church's father-in-law, had announced his candidacy for governor in Idaho City in 1940.

=== Chinese ===
Four thousand Chinese people lived in the Idaho Territory from 1869 to 1875. Like many Chinese immigrants, they came to “Gold Mountain” to work as miners, or found work as laundrymen and cooks. The store of Pon Yam, a prominent Chinese businessman Pon Yam House from 1867 is one of the only remaining buildings from Idaho City's Chinese. Although today Chinese are rarely seen except as tourists, the 1870 census reported at 1,751 Chinese who were nearly half of city residents. Annie Lee was one legendary Idaho city woman who like Polly Bemis, escaped from sexual slavery. She escaped from a member of the Yeong Wo Company in the 1870s to Boise to marry her lover, another Chinese man. Charged by her owner with grand larceny, she told a judge that she wanted to stay in Boise City. The judge subsequently granted her freedom.

=== Historic district ===
- Idaho City
- U.S. National Register of Historic Places
- Location within Idaho Location within the United States
- Location: Bounded by city limits, Idaho City, Idaho
- Area: 87 acres (35 ha)
- Built: 1862
- NRHP reference No.: 75000626
- Added to NRHP: June 27, 1975

The entirety of Idaho City, as bounded by the city limits in 1975, was listed as a historic district on the National Register of Historic Places in 1975. The listing included 15 contributing buildings on 87 acres (35 ha).

The historic buildings include:

- Boise County Courthouse (c.1867), serving as a county road maintenance shop in 1975
- Boise Basin Museum (1867), built as a post office
- the I.O.O.F. Hall (1855), home of the oldest Independent Order of Odd Fellows lodge in Idaho, Pioneer Lodge No. 1., two-stories-tall, on a hill overlooking the rest of the city
- Boise Basin Mercantile Company (1870), a one-story brick building
- Masonic Hall (1865)
- Idaho City Fire Station (c.1870)
- Idaho City Schoolhouse (1892)

== Geography and climate ==
According to the United States Census Bureau, the city has a total area of 0.67 square miles (1.74 km^{2}), all of it land.

Idaho City experiences a fairly typical Inland Northwest continental Mediterranean climate (Köppen Dsb) with cold, snowy winters and warm, dry summers, typified throughout by large diurnal temperature variations. The town averages 224.3 nights below 32 °F (0 °C) per year – as many as Fairbanks, Alaska, and 100 more than nearby Boise – 25.6 days which fail to top freezing, and 12 nights that fall below 0 °F (−17.8 °C). Owing to its more exposed location and slightly higher altitude, it is not only noticeably cooler but also much wetter than Boise, receiving twice as much precipitation and almost four times as much snowfall, which averages 69.1 inches (175.5 cm) with a maximum daily snow depth of 74 inches (188.0 cm) in February 1949.

Climate data for Idaho City, Idaho, 1991–2020 normals, extremes 1894–2013
Month	Jan	Feb	Mar	Apr	May	Jun	Jul	Aug	Sep	Oct	Nov	Dec	Year
Record high °F (°C)	75 (24)	76 (24)	78 (26)	89 (32)	97 (36)	106 (41)	109 (43)	106 (41)	100 (38)	93 (34)	75 (24)	70 (21)	109 (43)
Mean maximum °F (°C)	46.6 (8.1)	53.0 (11.7)	63.4 (17.4)	76.6 (24.8)	85.7 (29.8)	92.8 (33.8)	99.0 (37.2)	98.0 (36.7)	91.7 (33.2)	80.6 (27.0)	61.6 (16.4)	45.8 (7.7)	100.2 (37.9)
Mean daily maximum °F (°C)	35.3 (1.8)	40.5 (4.7)	47.8 (8.8)	56.0 (13.3)	66.4 (19.1)	75.3 (24.1)	87.1 (30.6)	86.3 (30.2)	76.5 (24.7)	61.5 (16.4)	44.2 (6.8)	34.6 (1.4)	59.3 (15.2)
Daily mean °F (°C)	24.4 (−4.2)	28.2 (−2.1)	34.9 (1.6)	41.7 (5.4)	50.5 (10.3)	57.8 (14.3)	66.3 (19.1)	65.0 (18.3)	56.1 (13.4)	44.5 (6.9)	32.5 (0.3)	24.3 (−4.3)	43.9 (6.6)
Mean daily minimum °F (°C)	13.5 (−10.3)	15.9 (−8.9)	22.0 (−5.6)	27.5 (−2.5)	34.5 (1.4)	40.3 (4.6)	45.6 (7.6)	43.6 (6.4)	35.6 (2.0)	27.5 (−2.5)	20.7 (−6.3)	13.9 (−10.1)	28.4 (−2.0)
Mean minimum °F (°C)	−7.1 (−21.7)	−2.6 (−19.2)	8.8 (−12.9)	18.0 (−7.8)	23.3 (−4.8)	29.1 (−1.6)	35.3 (1.8)	34.0 (1.1)	25.0 (−3.9)	16.3 (−8.7)	4.0 (−15.6)	−6.1 (−21.2)	−13.1 (−25.1)
Record low °F (°C)	−38 (−39)	−35 (−37)	−20 (−29)	−8 (−22)	11 (−12)	20 (−7)	26 (−3)	24 (−4)	11 (−12)	2 (−17)	−18 (−28)	−32 (−36)	−38 (−39)
Average precipitation inches (mm)	3.16 (80)	1.94 (49)	2.26 (57)	1.59 (40)	2.11 (54)	1.09 (28)	0.32 (8.1)	0.44 (11)	0.77 (20)	1.50 (38)	2.41 (61)	3.53 (90)	21.12 (536.1)
Average snowfall inches (cm)	18.6 (47)	9.9 (25)	3.9 (9.9)	2.0 (5.1)	0.2 (0.51)	0.0 (0.0)	0.0 (0.0)	0.0 (0.0)	0.0 (0.0)	0.4 (1.0)	10.0 (25)	24.1 (61)	69.1 (174.51)
Average precipitation days (≥ 0.01 in)	10.6	8.1	9.9	9.6	8.1	6.6	2.6	2.1	3.0	6.0	9.4	11.6	87.6
Average snowy days (≥ 0.1 in)	7.4	4.7	2.3	0.6	0.1	0.0	0.0	0.0	0.0	0.3	3.8	7.9	27.1
Source 1: NOAA (snow/snow days 1981–2010)
Source 2: National Weather Service (mean maxima/minima 1981–2010)

== Demographics ==
Historical population
Census	Pop.	Note	%±
1880	672		—
1900	390		—
1910	262		−32.8%
1920	104		−60.3%
1930	187		79.8%
1940	273		46.0%
1950	246		−9.9%
1960	188		−23.6%
1970	164		−12.8%
1980	300		82.9%
1990	322		7.3%
2000	458		42.2%
2010	485		5.9%
2020	466		−3.9%
U.S. Decennial Census

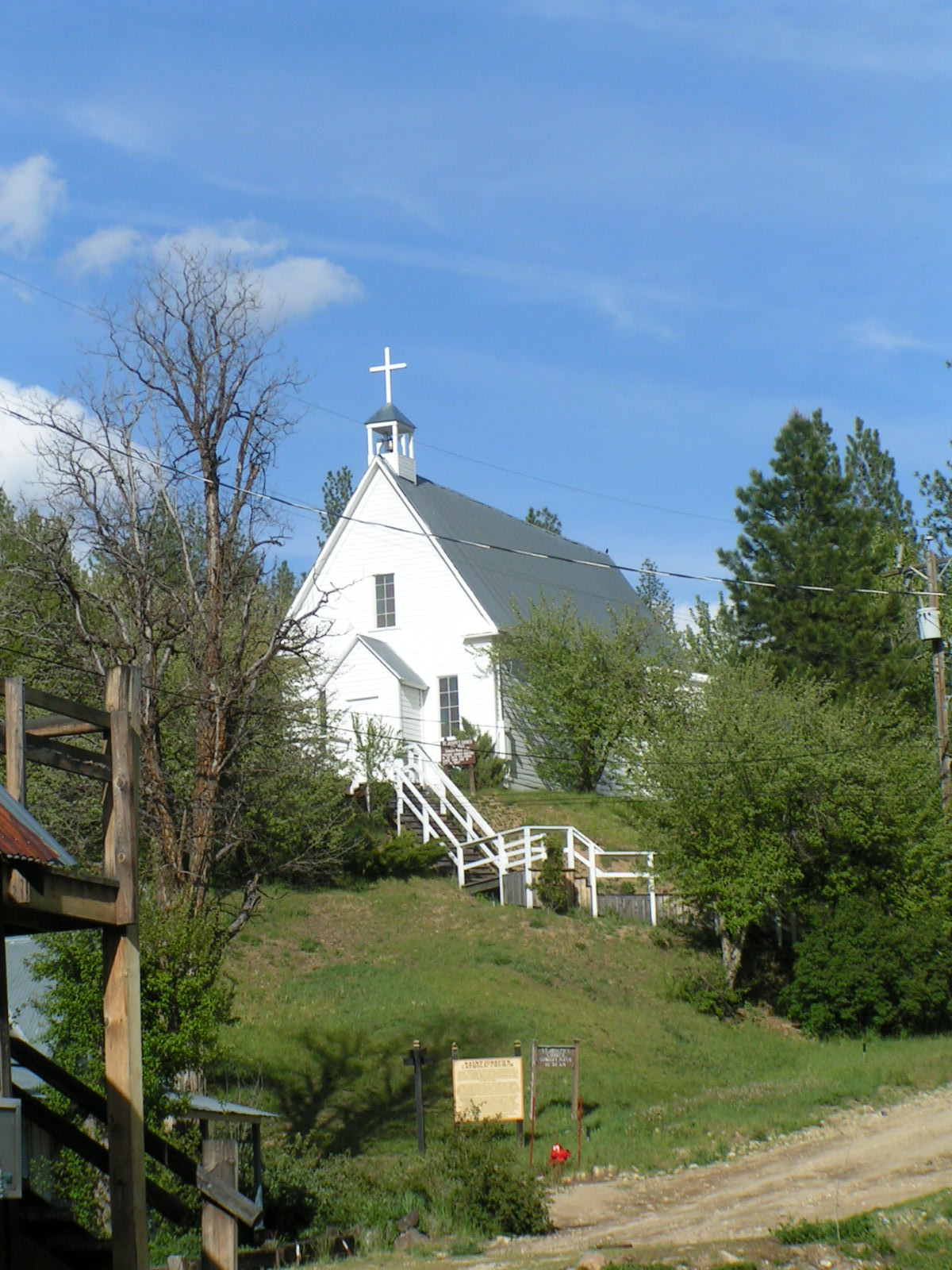
St. Joseph's Catholic Church in 2004

=== 2020 census ===
As of the census of 2020 and the 2022 American Community Survey, there were 466 people, 319 households, and 226 families residing in the city. There were 267 housing units. The racial makeup of the city was 84.33% White, 2.57% Native American, 0.85% Asian, 0.85% African American, 0.64% from other races, and 10.72% from two or more races. Hispanic or Latino of any race were 5.79% of the population.

There were 319 households, out of which 29.18% had children under the age of 18 living with them, 58.9% were married couples living together, 12.5% had a female householder with no husband present, and 22.9% were non-families. 22.9% of all households were made up of individuals, and 9.4% had someone living alone who was 65 years of age or older. The average household size was 2.10 and the average family size was 2.44.

The median age in the city was 38.3 years. 26.44% of residents were under the age of 18; 0.14% were between the ages of 18 and 24; 35.5% were from 25 to 44; 17.26% were from 45 to 64; and 20.65% were 65 years of age or older. For every 100 females, there was 84.9 males.

The median income for a household in the city was $42,361, and the median income for a family was $53,967 compared to $33,232 for nonfamily households. The per capita income for the city was $57,496. About 6.8% of the population were below the poverty line, including 26.44% of those under age 18 and 20.65% of those age 65 or over. The city has an employment rate of 58.6%, with 23.5% of the population holding a high school diploma and 9.7% a bachelor's degree or higher. 15.9% of people are disabled, and 19.9% of those in the city have no health care coverage.

=== 2010 census ===
As of the census of 2010, there were 485 people, 216 households, and 124 families residing in the city. The population density was 723.9 inhabitants per square mile (279.5/km^{2}). There were 294 housing units at an average density of 438.8 units per square mile (169.4 units/km^{2}). The racial makeup of the city was 94.2% White, 1.6% Native American, 0.8% Asian, 0.6% from other races, and 2.7% from two or more races. Hispanic or Latino of any race were 4.9% of the population.

There were 216 households, of which 28.2% had children under the age of 18 living with them, 43.5% were married couples living together, 9.7% had a female householder with no husband present, 4.2% had a male householder with no wife present, and 42.6% were non-families. 37.0% of all households were made up of individuals, and 11.1% had someone living alone who was 65 years of age or older. The average household size was 2.25 and the average family size was 2.97.

The median age in the city was 42.2 years. 23.9% of residents were under the age of 18; 6.5% were between the ages of 18 and 24; 22.6% were from 25 to 44; 34.1% were from 45 to 64; and 13% were 65 years of age or older. The gender makeup of the city was 51.1% male and 48.9% female.

=== 2000 census ===
As of the census of 2000, there were 458 people, 191 households, and 119 families residing in the city. The population density was 652.5 inhabitants per square mile (251.9/km^{2}). There were 257 housing units at an average density of 366.2 units per square mile (141.4 units/km^{2}). The racial makeup of the city was 92.36% White, 3.06% Native American, 0.87% Asian, 0.66% from other races, and 3.06% from two or more races. Hispanic or Latino of any race were 1.53% of the population.

There were 191 households, out of which 34.6% had children under the age of 18 living with them, 46.1% were married couples living together, 12.0% had a female householder with no husband present, and 37.2% were non-families. 30.9% of all households were made up of individuals, and 5.8% had someone living alone who was 65 years of age or older. The average household size was 2.38 and the average family size was 3.00.

In the city, the population was spread out, with 29.3% under the age of 18, 6.1% from 18 to 24, 28.4% from 25 to 44, 28.4% from 45 to 64, and 7.9% who were 65 years of age or older. The median age was 37 years. For every 100 females, there were 97.4 males. For every 100 females age 18 and over, there were 95.2 males.

The median income for a household in the city was $28,068, and the median income for a family was $33,295. Males had a median income of $25,750 versus $20,000 for females. The per capita income for the city was $13,370. About 17.3% of families and 19.3% of the population were below the poverty line, including 28.7% of those under age 18 and 5.9% of those age 65 or over.

== Political representation ==
Idaho City is included in Idaho's 1st congressional district and has been represented by Republican Russ Fulcher since 2019.

The current mayor is Phillip J. Canody.

== Population history ==
- 1863: 6,275
- 1864: 7,000
- 1980: 300
- 1990: 322
- 2000: 461
- 2010: 485
- 2020: 466

== Transportation ==
- - SH-21 to Boise (south) and Stanley (north)

The city is served by State Highway 21, a two-lane undivided highway that connects to Boise to the southwest. To the northeast, it continues on to Lowman and Stanley. The highway travels through the Boise National Forest and is designated as the “Ponderosa Pine Scenic Byway.” The route ascends to Banner Creek Summit at 7,056 feet (2,151 m) and later enters the Sawtooth National Recreation Area about 12 miles (19 km) northwest of Stanley.
