= Sawtooth Valley =

Valley in Blaine and Custer counties in Idaho, United States

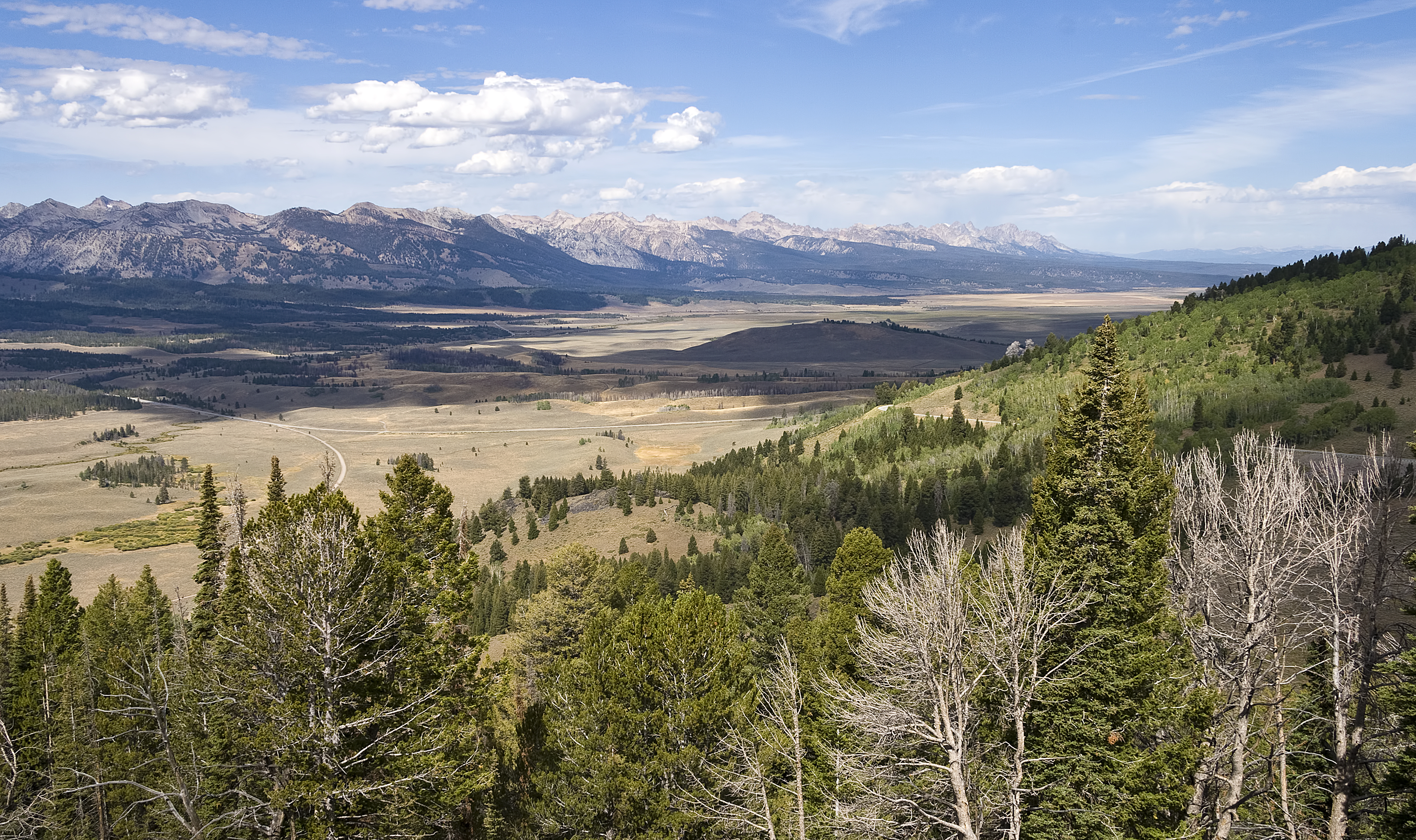
- The Sawtooth Valley from Galena Summit, September 2010

- Location within Idaho Location within the United States
- Floor elevation: 6,300 feet (1,920 m)
- Length: 30 miles (50 km) N-S
- Width: 10 miles (16 km)

Geography
- Location: Blaine and Custer counties in Idaho, United States
- Population centers: Stanley
- Coordinates: 44°09′47″N 114°53′02″W
- Traversed by: State Highway 75
- Interactive map of Sawtooth Valley

The Sawtooth Valley is a valley in the Western United States, in Blaine and Custer counties in central Idaho, United States.

== Description ==
About 30 miles (48 km) long, the valley is in Sawtooth National Recreation Area (SNRA) in the Sawtooth National Forest. It is surrounded by the Sawtooth Mountains to the west, White Cloud Mountains to the east, Salmon River Mountains to the north, and Boulder and Smoky Mountains to the south. The valley contains the headwaters of the Salmon River, the city of Stanley, and community of Sawtooth City.

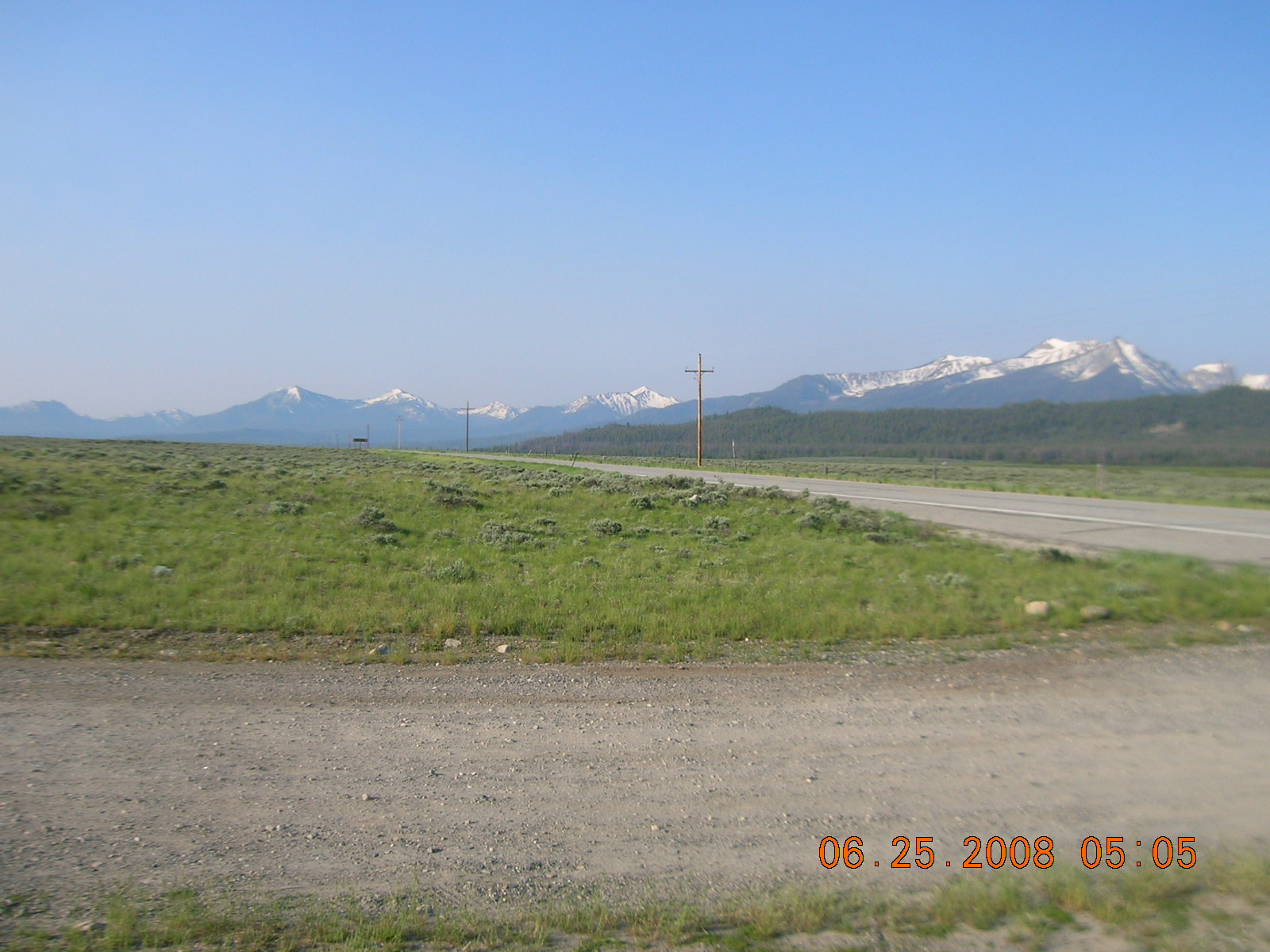
Southern Sawtooth Valley, June 2008

Idaho State Highway 75 (SH-75), also known as the Sawtooth Scenic Byway, transverses the valley's entire length. SH-75 enters the valley from the south at Galena Summit and exits to the north near Stanley. SH-75 was formerly designated as U.S. Route 93, which is now routed through Arco.

Sawtooth Valley contains several large lakes in the SNRA, including Redfish, Alturas, Pettit, and Stanley lakes. Valley floor elevations range from just under 6,300 feet (1,920 m) near Stanley to over 7,500 feet (2,290 m) below Galena Summit. Elevations along the valley's borders reach 11,815 feet (3,601 m) at Castle Peak in the White Cloud Mountains to the east and 10,715 feet (3,266 m) at Thompson Peak in the Sawtooth Mountains to the west.

In 2017, the Sawtooth Valley was designated part of the Central Idaho Dark Sky Reserve.
