= Idaho State Highway 21 =

State highway in Idaho, United States

State Highway 21
- SH-21 highlighted in red

Route information
- Maintained by ITD
- Length: 130.869 mi (210.613 km)
- Tourist routes: Ponderosa Pine Scenic Byway

Major junctions
- South end: I-84 / US 20 / US 26 / US 30 in Boise
- North end: SH-75 in Stanley

Location
- Country: United States
- State: Idaho
- Counties: Ada, Boise, Custer

Highway system
- Idaho State Highway System; Interstate; US; State
← SH-19	→ SH-22

State Highway 21 (SH-21), also known as the Ponderosa Pine Scenic Byway, is a state highway in Idaho. It runs from Boise to Stanley, primarily as a two-lane road. With two-thirds of its length in Boise County, it passes by historic Idaho City and the village of Lowman to the western edge of the Sawtooth Mountains, then along their northern boundary to Stanley.

The road is designated as one of Idaho's scenic byways and provides access to Sawtooth National Recreation Area from Boise and the Treasure Valley. It primarily follows the Boise River and its tributary Mores Creek to the Boise Basin and beyond, and then the upper South Fork of the Payette River and a tributary from Lowman to Banner Creek Summit.

== Route description ==
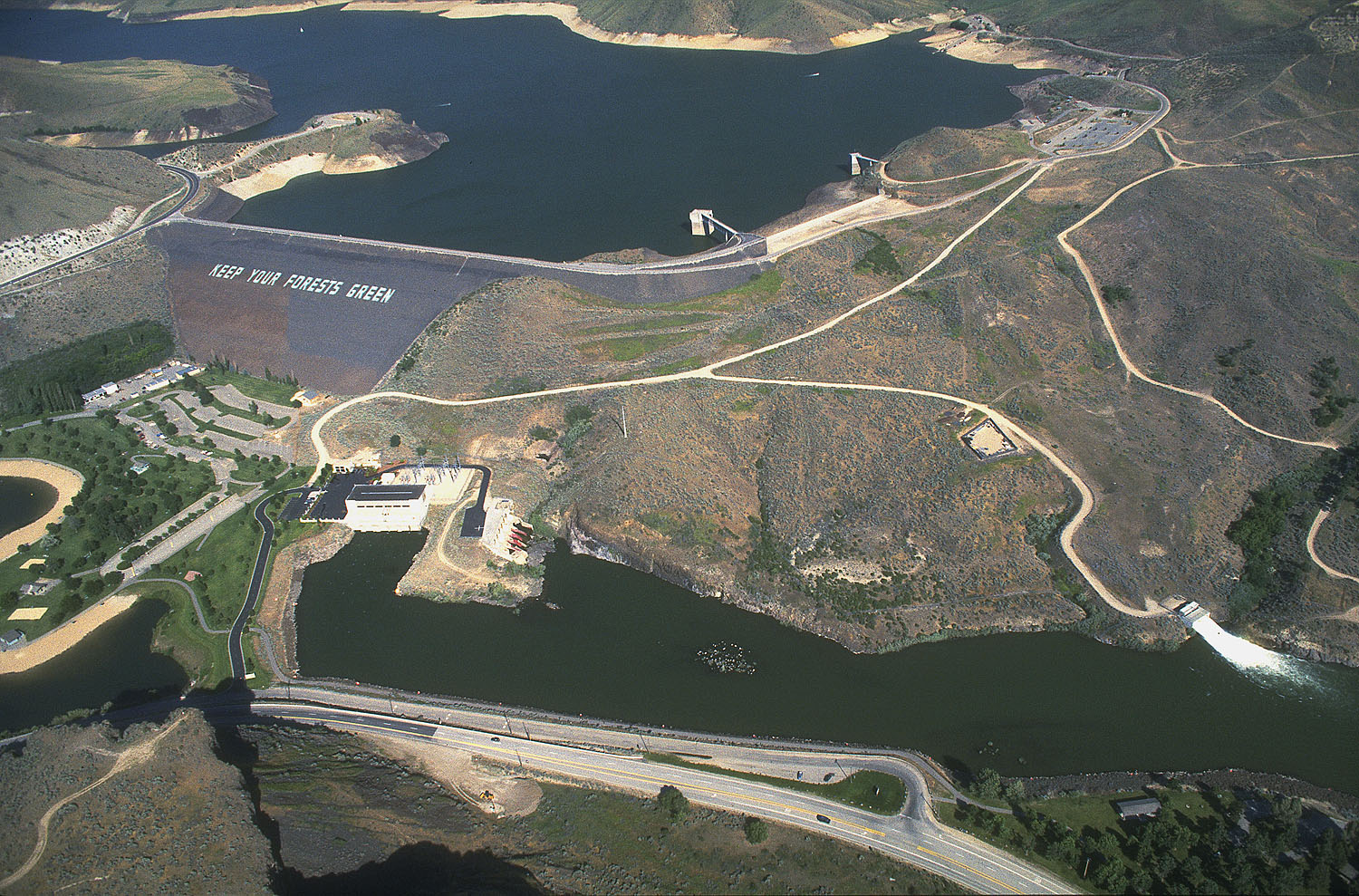
Lucky Peak Dam near Boise

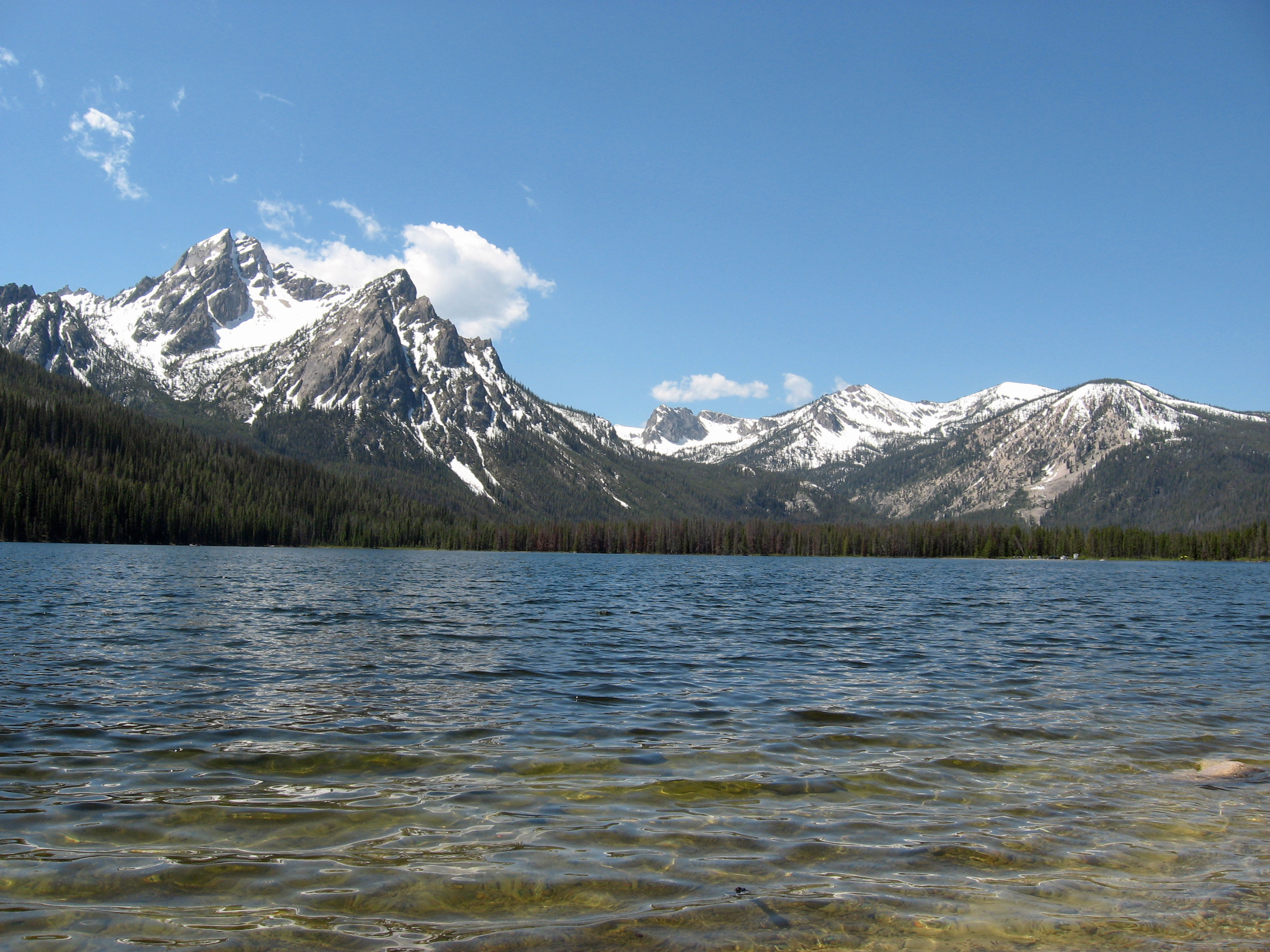
McGown Peak & Stanley Lake

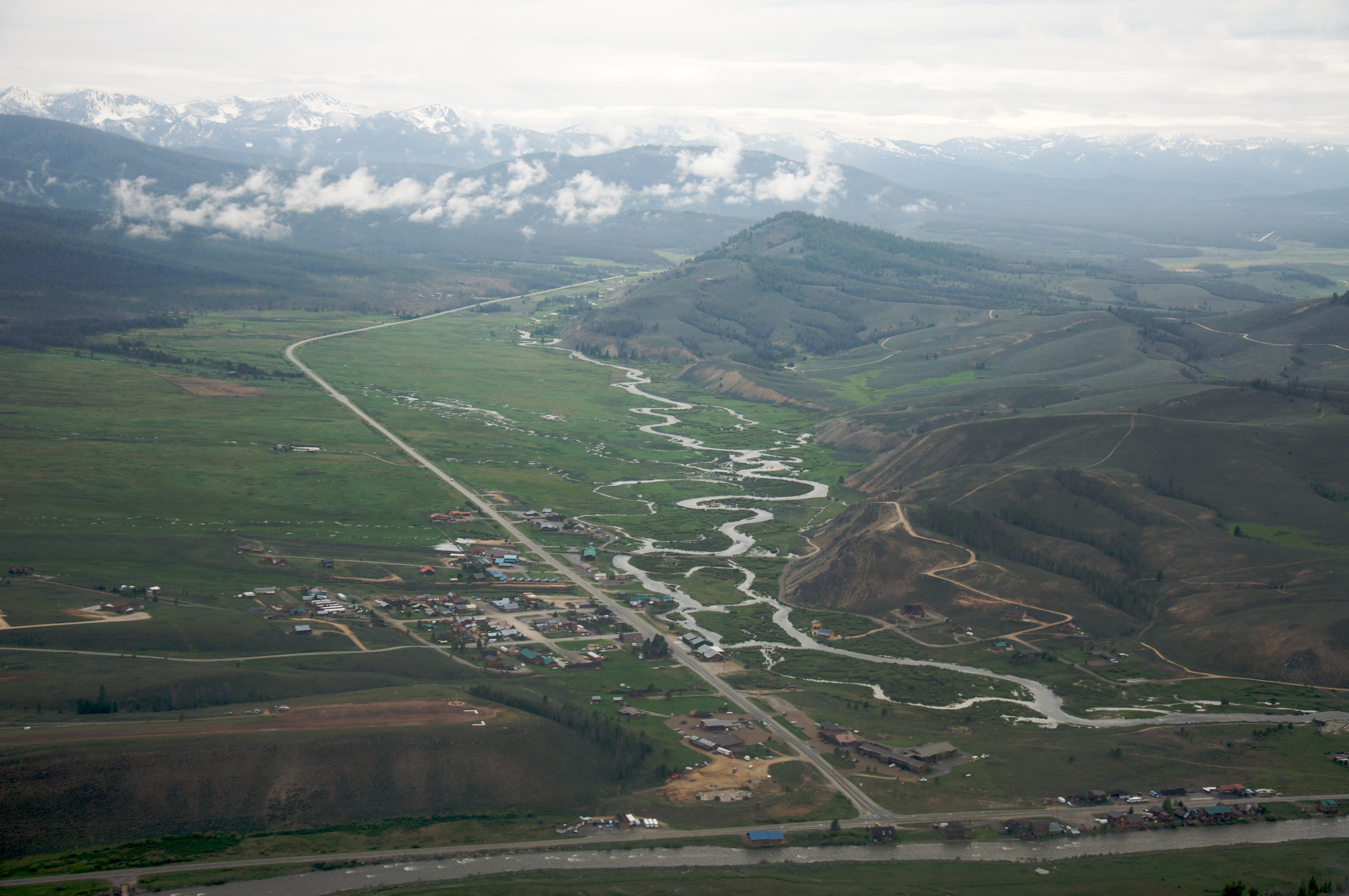
Northern terminus of SH-21 at Stanley

SH-21 begins at exit 57 of Interstate 84 southeast of Boise, exactly 3,000 feet (910 m) above sea level. The highway is an eastern extension of Gowen Road, which runs along the southern and western perimeter of the Boise Airport (and the Air National Guard's Gowen Field) to connect with Orchard Road at exit 52 of I-84.

After three miles (5 km) eastbound from I-84, Highway 21 descends and crosses the New York Canal and Boise River on a bridge constructed in 1996, and connects with Warm Springs Avenue, old SH-21, from east Boise. The highway heads upstream, briefly as a four-lane divided highway, along the north bank of the river in a basalt canyon. The route passes the century-old Boise River Diversion Dam (1909), and several miles later the Lucky Peak Dam, completed in 1955.

Above the Lucky Peak Dam, SH-21 climbs over the Highland Valley Summit (3,782 ft (1,153 m)), then descends to just above the reservoir. It then crosses the Mores Creek tributary and ascends with it to the Boise Basin gold mining area centered around Idaho City, leaving the sagebrush to enter the Ponderosa pine forest of the Boise National Forest. After Idaho City, the highway continues to climb with Mores Creek for another 13 miles (21 km) to the Mores Creek Summit at 6,117 feet (1,864 m), and with Beaver Creek to the Beaver Creek Summit at 6,041 feet (1,841 m) ten miles (16 km) further. Following this summit, SH-21 descends 2,240 feet (683 m) in switchbacks to the village of Lowman at 3,801 feet (1,159 m) above sea level.

At Lowman is the intersection with the Wildlife Canyon Scenic Byway, which descends with the South Fork of the Payette River through a canyon popular for whitewater rafting, westward to Banks at Highway 55. A devastating wildfire ravaged the area around Lowman in 1989; it destroyed 45,000 acres (70 sq mi; 180 km^{2}) and 26 structures, but without injuries or fatalities.

North of Lowman, SH-21 ascends the South Fork of the Payette River to Grandjean, on the west side of the Sawtooths, and climbs the Canyon Creek tributary to the Banner Creek Summit at 7,056 feet (2,151 m), the route's maximum elevation, over 3,200 feet (980 m) above Lowman.

At the Banner Creek Summit, SH-21 enters Custer County and the Challis National Forest, and descends northward with Banner Creek and Cape Horn Creek, tributaries of the Middle Fork of the Salmon River. At "Cape Horn" the highway turns southeast to gradually climb with Marsh Creek to the border of the Sawtooth National Recreation Area, where SH-21 enters the drainage of the main Salmon River, and gently descends to Stanley. About four miles (6.5 km) west of Stanley is the turnoff for the three-mile (5 km) spur road to the photogenic Stanley Lake at 6,513 feet (1,985 m), framed by the jagged McGown Peak at 9,860 feet (3,005 m).

In Stanley, SH-21 terminates at 6,250 feet (1,905 m) at the junction with SH-75, the Sawtooth Scenic Byway from Galena Summit and Ketchum to the south, originating in Shoshone. North of the intersection in Stanley, Highway 75 becomes the Salmon River Scenic Byway, and continues due north for a mile, then veers east with the twisty main Salmon River as it descends to Clayton, then north towards Challis, where the route terminates and rejoins US-93 just south of the city limits.

The upper elevations of SH-21 are often closed during the winter months.

== History ==
Portions of the highway originated in the 1860s, as a toll road connecting Boise with the gold mining areas near Idaho City.

SH-21 originally terminated in Downtown Boise by following Warm Springs Avenue along the north side of the Boise River. The state government approved a realignment that truncated the highway at the Gowen Road interchange on I-84 in 1980. A temporary routing was used while a new four-lane highway between the freeway and SH-21 near Lucky Peak Dam was planned in the 1980s. The realigned SH-21 would also serve an expanded Micron Technology facility and residential development on land owned by the J.R. Simplot Company. The new bridge over the Boise River began construction in March 1995 and was opened the following year. The former alignment was transferred to the Ada County Highway District on February 1, 1997.

== Major intersections ==
County	Location	mi	km	Destinations	Notes
Ada	Boise	0.00	0.00	I-84 (US 20 / US 26 / US 30) – Boise, Twin Falls, Mountain Home	Southern terminus; I-84 exit 57; road continues west as Gowen Road
Boise	Lowman	72.61	116.85	Wildlife Canyon Scenic Byway (Banks-Lowman Road) – Garden Valley, Banks	Elevation 3,800 ft (1,160 m)
Custer	Stanley	130.87	210.61	SH-75 – Lower Stanley, Salmon, Sun Valley	Northern terminus; SH-75 north is the Salmon River Scenic Byway, SH-75 south is the Sawtooth Scenic Byway
1.000 mi = 1.609 km; 1.000 km = 0.621 mi

== See also ==
- List of state highways in Idaho
