= Idaho State Highway 75 =

State highway in Lincoln, Blaine, and Custer Counties in Idaho, United States

State Highway 75

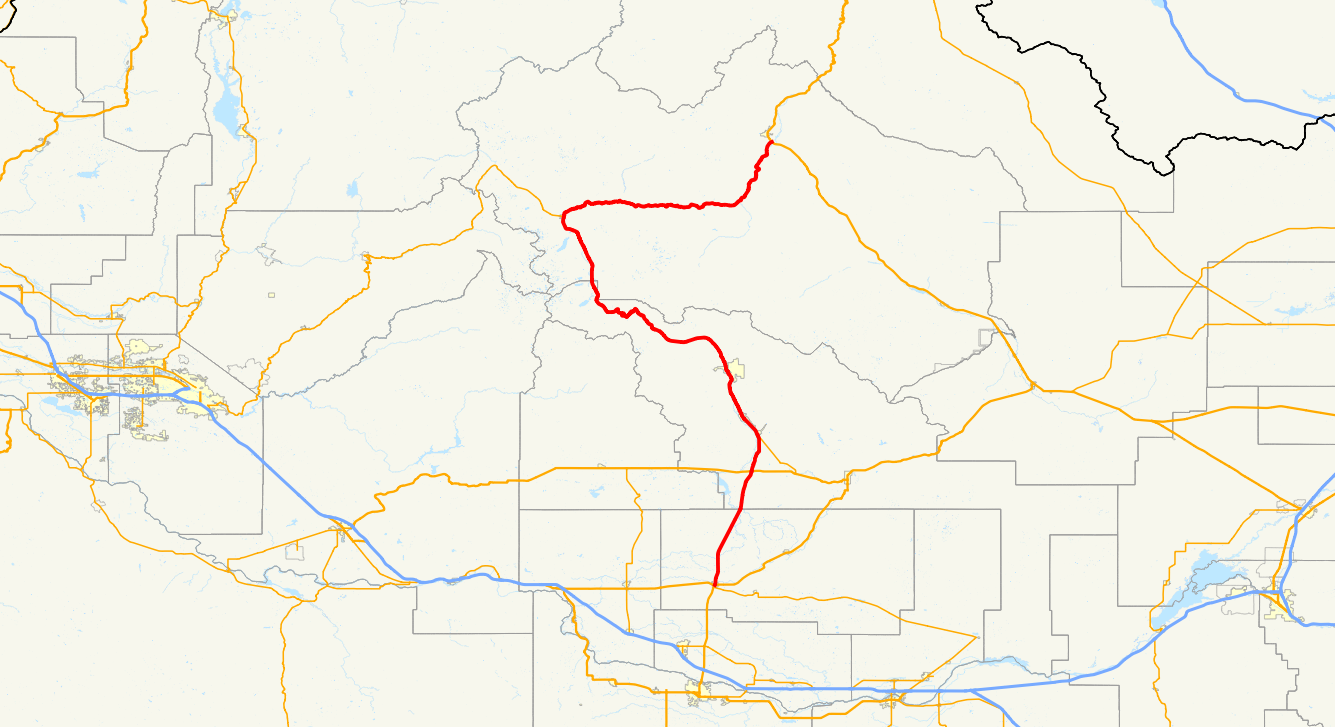

Route information
- Maintained by ITD
- Length: 170.666 mi (274.660 km)
- Tourist routes: Sawtooth Scenic Byway (Shoshone to Stanley); Salmon River Scenic Byway (Stanley to Challis)

Major junctions
- South end: US 93 / US 26 in Shoshone
- US 20 near Stanton Crossing; SH-21 at Stanley
- North end: US 93 near Challis

Location
- Country: United States
- State: Idaho
- Counties: Lincoln, Blaine, Custer

Highway system
- Idaho State Highway System; Interstate; US; State
| ← SH-74 | → SH-77 |

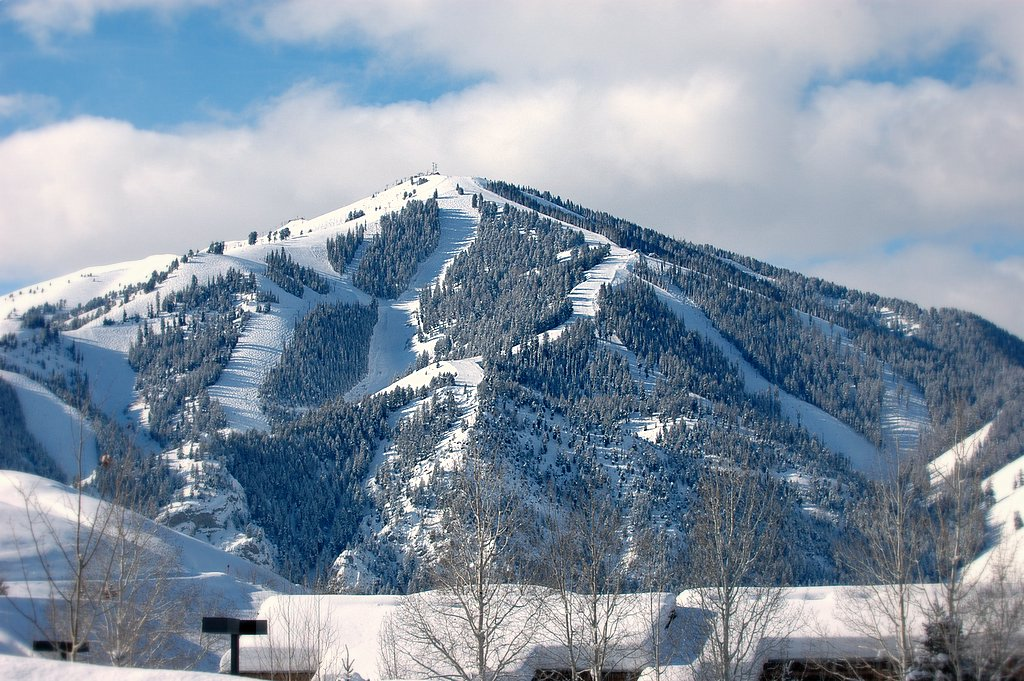
Sun Valley's Bald Mountain

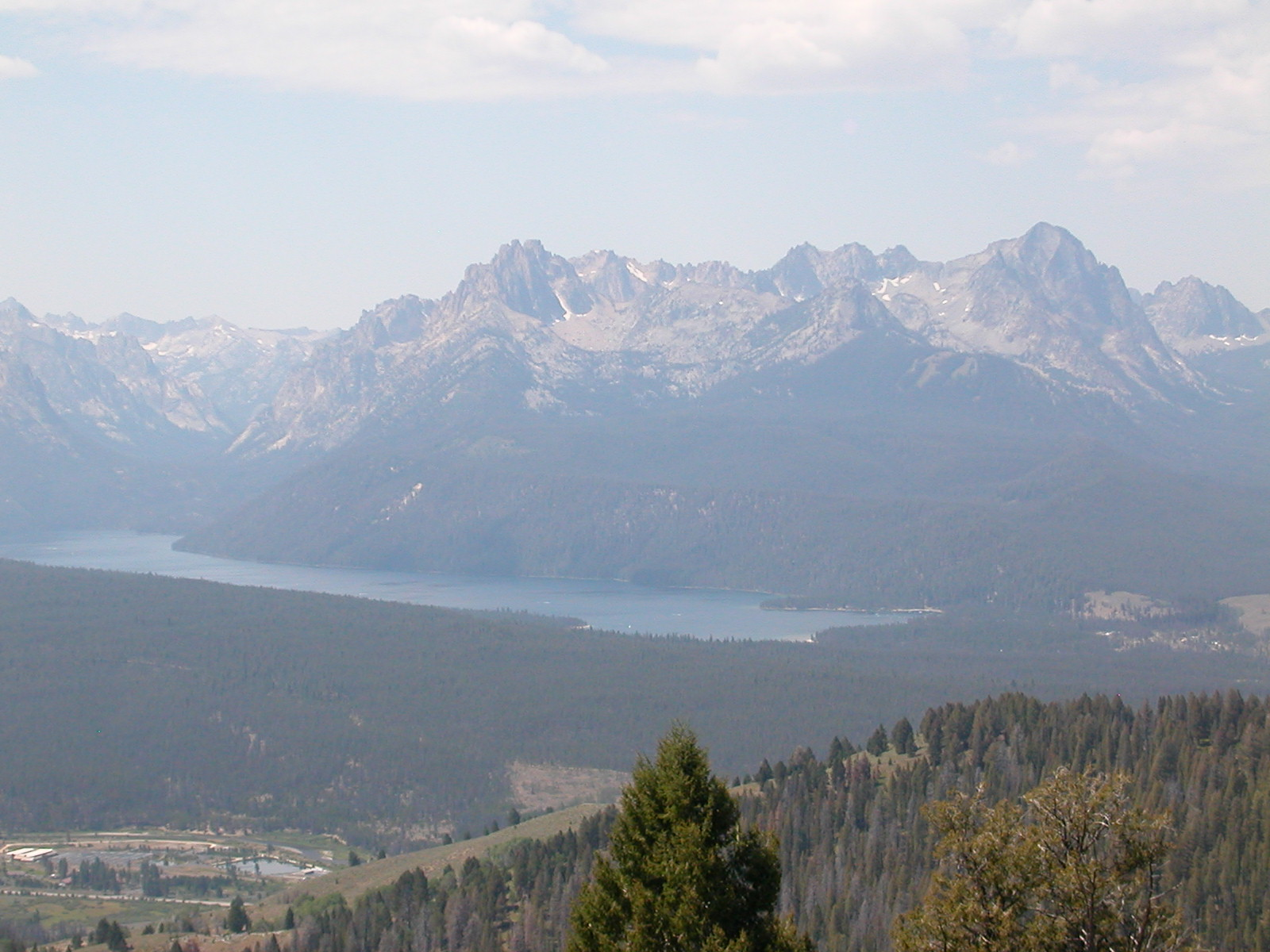
Redfish Lake & Sawtooths from Boundary Creek

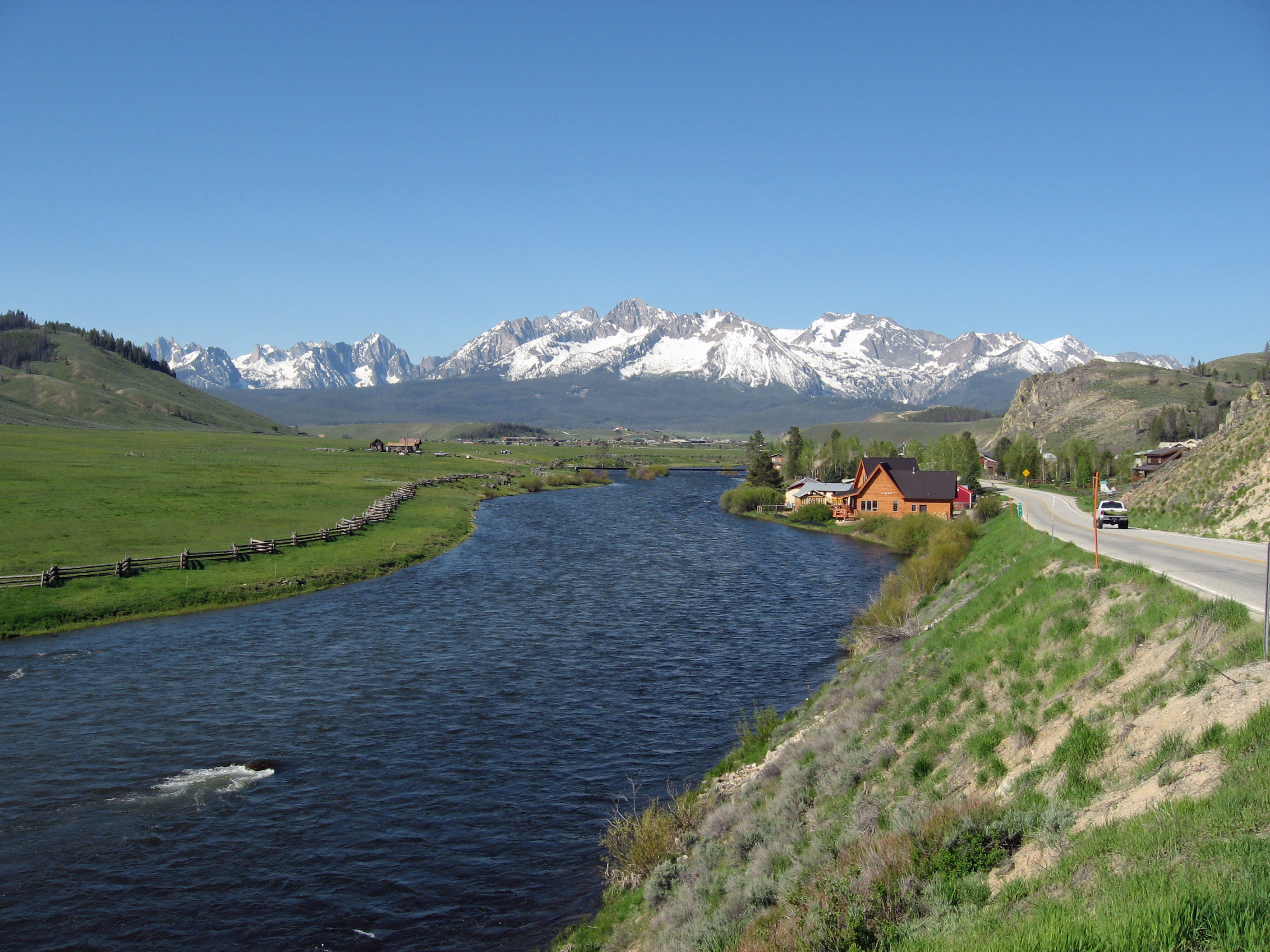
Salmon River & Sawtooths from Lower Stanley

State Highway 75 is a two-lane highway in the western United States that travels through the Sawtooth Valley of central Idaho. The highway's southern terminus is in Shoshone, and its northern is near Challis. It is designated as one of Idaho's scenic byways and provides access to Sawtooth National Recreation Area and primarily follows the Big Wood River in the south and the main Salmon River in the north, divided by Galena Summit.

== Route description ==
State Highway 75 begins in Lincoln County at Shoshone at a junction with US-93 on Greenwood Street at an elevation of just under 4,000 feet (1,220 m) above sea level. The highway heads northward, and ascends the Big Wood River valley, into Blaine County, past the Magic Reservoir to the west and crosses US-20 at Timmerman Junction at 4,884 feet (1,490 m).

It continues northward as the Sawtooth Scenic Byway to pass through the Big Wood River communities of Bellevue, Hailey, and Ketchum. Sun Valley is accessible via a spur route junction in Ketchum at Third Street, which becomes Sun Valley Road.

Seven miles (11 km) north of Ketchum, the highway passes by the headquarters of the Sawtooth National Recreation Area at 6,250 feet (1,905 m) and the Boulder Mountains to the north, with peaks over 11,000 feet (3,350 m). SH-75 climbs past the Galena Lodge to the Galena Summit at 8,701 feet (2,652 m), then descends to the scenic viewpoint about a mile later at 8,400 feet (2,560 m), overlooking the Sawtooth Mountains to the west and headwaters of the Salmon River in the Sawtooth Valley.

Highway 75 descends the grade and reaches the upper end of the valley floor at new Sawtooth City at 7,190 feet (2,190 m), and then enters Custer County. It runs northward down the valley with the Salmon River to Obsidian and Stanley, with the Sawtooths to the immediate west and the White Cloud Mountains to the slightly more distant east. The turnoff to picturesque Redfish Lake is about five miles (8 km) south of Stanley.

At Stanley, the highway intersects with the northern terminus of State Highway 21, the Ponderosa Pine Scenic Byway from Boise, through Idaho City and Lowman. The junction is at 6,250 feet (1,905 m) and Highway 75 northbound becomes the Salmon River Scenic Byway, continuing north for a mile, then veering east and descending with the twisty river towards Clayton. Both then head north towards Challis, where the route terminates and rejoins US-93 just south of the city limits, at an elevation of 5,004 feet (1,525 m).

== History ==
In 1824, while searching the mountain wilderness of present-day Idaho, known then as Columbia District, for beaver, Alexander Ross came up the Wood River and discovered Galena Summit on September 18. Leading a large brigade of Hudson's Bay Company trappers, he wondered if he could get through unknown mountains and rocky defiles that obstructed his passage back to his base of operations at present Challis. Unwilling to turn back he pressed on to explore Stanley Basin and the difficult canyon beyond. When he reached Challis on October 5, 1824, he had traveled the route now followed by State Highway 75 from Bellevue to Salmon through mostly unexplored land.

The road itself dates back to at least 1926, when it was designated U.S. Route 93. The former U.S. Route 93 Alternate, running through Arco, was redesignated 49 years ago in 1977 as U.S. Route 93, and this route was given its current state highway designation.

== Spur route ==
SH-75 has a spur route connecting Ketchum to Sun Valley, running northeast for 3.6 miles (5.8 km), as Third Street in Ketchum and then Sun Valley Road. In 2020, the Idaho Transportation Department (ITD) proposed abandoning the spur route, transferring ownership at the request of Blaine County due to urban growth along the corridor.

== Major intersections ==
| County | Location | mi | km | Destinations | Notes |
|---|---|---|---|---|---|
| Lincoln | Shoshone | 73.659 | 118.543 | US 93 / US 26 – Twin Falls, Boise, Richfield | Southern terminus of SH-75/Sawtooth Scenic Byway; highway continues as US 93 south/US 26 west |
| Blaine | Timmerman Junction | 102.124 | 164.353 | US 20 west – Fairfield, Carey, Boise | |
| Blaine | Ketchum | 128.363 | 206.580 | SH-75 Spur (Sun Valley Road) | |
| Blaine | Galena Summit | 157.954 | 254.202 | Elevation 8,701 feet (2,652 m) | |
| Custer | Stanley | 189.378 | 304.774 | SH-21 west (Ponderosa Pine Scenic Byway) – Boise | Northern terminus of the Sawtooth Scenic Byway; southern terminus of the Salmon River Scenic Byway |
| Custer | | 244.325 | 393.203 | US 93 (Idaho Byway) – Challis, Salmon, Arco | Northern terminus of SH-75/Salmon River Scenic Byway |
1.000 mi = 1.609 km; 1.000 km = 0.621 mi
