= Stanley, Idaho =

- Town
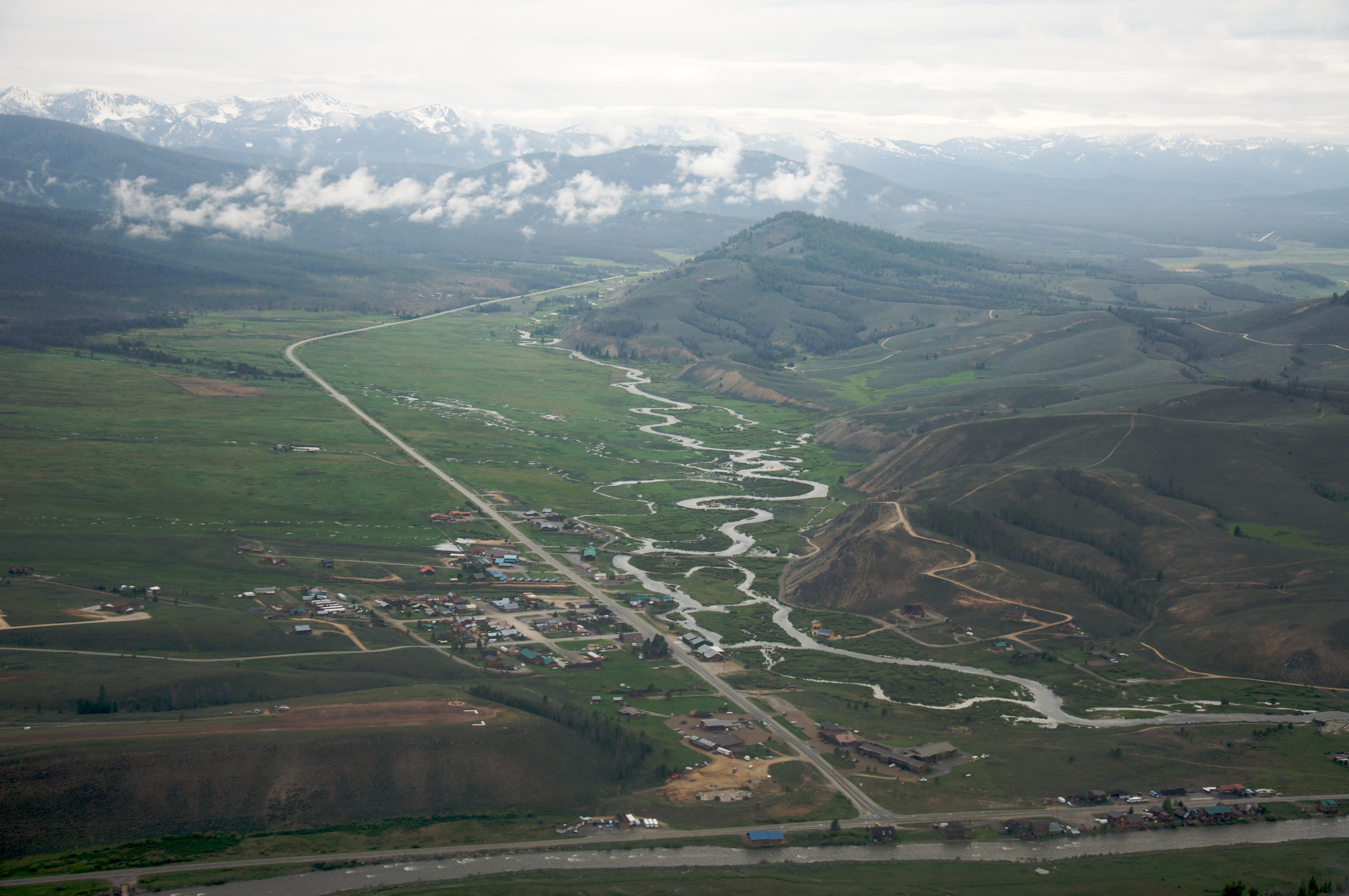
- Stanley in June 2009

- Location of Stanley in Custer County, Idaho.
- Coordinates: 44°12′54″N 114°56′11″W
- Country: United States
- State: Idaho
- County: Custer

Area
  - Total: 0.55 sq mi (1.42 km^{2})
  - Land: 0.54 sq mi (1.41 km^{2})
  - Water: 0.0039 sq mi (0.01 km^{2})
- Elevation: 6,290 ft (1,920 m)

Population (2020)
  - Total: 116
  - Density: 127/sq mi (49.1/km^{2})
- Time zone: UTC-7 (Mountain; MST)
  - Summer (DST): UTC-6 (MDT)
- ZIP code: 83278
- Area code: 208
- FIPS code: 16-76780
- GNIS feature ID: 2411968
- Website: www.cityofstanleyid.gov

Stanley is a town in the Sawtooth Valley in Custer County, Idaho, United States. The population was 116 at the 2020 census; up from 63 in 2010. The center of population of Idaho in 2000 was located in Stanley.

== History ==
Fur trappers of the Hudson's Bay Company discovered the Stanley Basin in the 1820s, but it was mostly avoided due to scarcity of beaver. Captain John Stanley, a Confederate Civil War veteran, led a party of twenty-three prospectors through the area in 1863 (or 1864), but they found little gold and moved on and discovered the Atlanta lode on the south end of the Sawtooths. The site was not considered a town until 1919 when its streets and lots were surveyed and recorded.

Stanley has long been a gathering place for the sparsely populated region.

In 2005, Hannah Stauts won the city's mayoral election at age 22 to become the state's youngest elected mayor.

The 2017 solar eclipse attracted a large number of visitors to Stanley and surrounding areas. The Milky Way is clearly visible in Stanley, and the town has sought the seal of approval from the International Dark-Sky Association. Stanley is located in the Central Idaho Dark Sky Reserve.

== Geography ==
According to the United States Census Bureau, the city has a total area of 0.62 square miles (1.61 km^{2}), of which, 0.61 square miles (1.58 km^{2}) is land and 0.01 square miles (0.03 km^{2}) is water. Stanley is surrounded by the Sawtooth National Recreation Area.

=== Major highways ===
- SH-21 - Ponderosa Pine Scenic Byway
- SH-75 - Sawtooth Scenic Byway (southbound), Salmon River Scenic Byway (northbound)

== 2020 earthquake ==
On March 31, 2020 at 5:48 MST, a M 6.5 earthquake 20 miles northwest of Stanley shook the town. This was the second strongest earthquake recorded in Idaho, behind the 6.9 Borah Peak earthquake of 1983.

== Demographics ==
Historical population
Census	Pop.	Note	%±
1950	33		—
1960	35		6.1%
1970	47		34.3%
1980	99		110.6%
1990	71		−28.3%
2000	100		40.8%
2010	63		−37.0%
2020	116		84.1%
U.S. Decennial Census

=== 2020 census ===
As of the census of 2020 there were 116 people in Stanley. There were 169 housing units.

=== 2010 census ===
As of the census of 2010, there were 63 people, 30 households, and 13 families living in the city. The population density was 103.3 inhabitants per square mile (39.9/km^{2}). There were 91 housing units at an average density of 149.2 per square mile (57.6/km^{2}). The racial makeup of the city was 100.0% White.

There were 30 households, of which 3.3% had children under the age of 18 living with them, 40.0% were married couples living together, 3.3% had a male householder with no wife present, and 56.7% were non-families. 40.0% of all households were made up of individuals, and 6.7% had someone living alone who was 65 years of age or older. The average household size was 1.73 and the average family size was 2.23.

The median age in the city was 52.5 years. 3.2% of residents were under the age of 18; 1.6% were between the ages of 18 and 24; 23.8% were from 25 to 44; 58.7% were from 45 to 64; and 12.7% were 65 years of age or older. The gender makeup of the city was 52.4% male and 47.6% female.

=== 2000 census ===
As of the census of 2000, there were 100 people, 45 households, and 23 families living in the city. The population density was 161.0 inhabitants per square mile (62.2/km^{2}). There were 77 housing units at an average density of 124.0 per square mile (47.9/km^{2}). The racial makeup of the city was 98.00% White, 1.00% Native American, and 1.00% from two or more races. Hispanic or Latino of any race were 1.00% of the population.

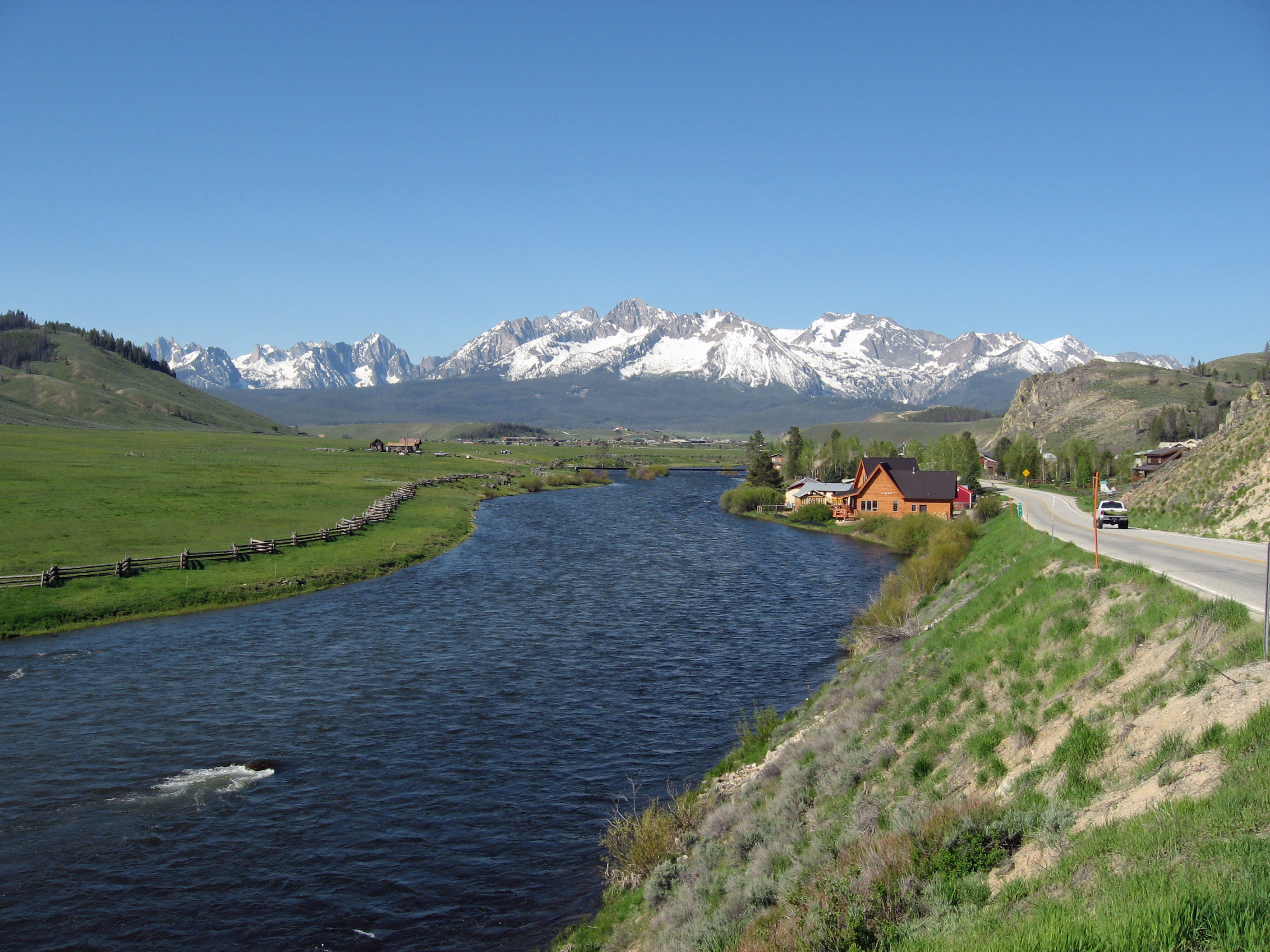
Salmon River & Sawtooths from Lower Stanley in June 2008

There were 45 households, out of which 24.4% had children under the age of 18 living with them, 51.1% were married couples living together, 2.2% had a female householder with no husband present, and 46.7% were non-families. 33.3% of all households were made up of individuals, and none had someone living alone who was 65 years of age or older. The average household size was 2.22 and the average family size was 3.00.

In the city, the population was spread out, with 24.0% under the age of 18, 6.0% from 18 to 24, 27.0% from 25 to 44, 40.0% from 45 to 64, and 3.0% who were 65 years of age or older. The median age was 39 years. For every 100 females, there were 122.2 males. For every 100 females age 18 and over, there were 123.5 males.

The median income for a household in the city was $37,813, and the median income for a family was $45,625. Males had a median income of $25,000 versus $37,500 for females. The per capita income for the city was $23,303. There were 25.9% of families and 21.4% of the population living below the poverty line, including 47.1% of those under 18 and none of those over 64.

== Government ==
In November 2005, residents elected 22-year-old Hannah Stauts as mayor of Stanley. Stauts, a former resident of Boise, was the youngest female mayor in the United States. She was succeeded by Herb Mumford, a retired engineer who was elected in November 2009. The current mayor is Steve Botti.

== Climate ==
Stanley has an alpine subarctic climate with very cold winters and warm summers with a very large diurnal temperature variation. Frosts can occur at any time of the year. There are on average 290 mornings in the year with frost (10 of them in July) and 60 nights that reach 0 °F (−17.8 °C). The cold weather is due to Stanley's location in a protected valley that traps cold air from the surrounding mountains, creating strong temperature inversions.

In latitude and elevation, Stanley's weather station is a near-perfect twin of the station at the summit of Mt. Washington in New Hampshire. But although both are quite cold, their climates are very different.

Climate data for Stanley, Idaho, 1991–2020 normals, extremes 1916–present: 6249ft (1905m)
Month	Jan	Feb	Mar	Apr	May	Jun	Jul	Aug	Sep	Oct	Nov	Dec	Year
Record high °F (°C)	54 (12)	56 (13)	64 (18)	77 (25)	87 (31)	93 (34)	98 (37)	98 (37)	92 (33)	84 (29)	67 (19)	60 (16)	98 (37)
Mean maximum °F (°C)	41.1 (5.1)	46.1 (7.8)	56.0 (13.3)	66.1 (18.9)	76.2 (24.6)	84.0 (28.9)	90.4 (32.4)	89.1 (31.7)	84.3 (29.1)	73.8 (23.2)	55.3 (12.9)	42.1 (5.6)	90.8 (32.7)
Mean daily maximum °F (°C)	25.7 (−3.5)	32.7 (0.4)	42.6 (5.9)	49.7 (9.8)	60.4 (15.8)	68.8 (20.4)	80.2 (26.8)	79.4 (26.3)	70.3 (21.3)	56.1 (13.4)	38.4 (3.6)	25.0 (−3.9)	52.4 (11.4)
Daily mean °F (°C)	11.3 (−11.5)	15.9 (−8.9)	25.6 (−3.6)	34.0 (1.1)	43.2 (6.2)	50.0 (10.0)	57.1 (13.9)	55.5 (13.1)	47.7 (8.7)	37.4 (3.0)	24.0 (−4.4)	11.4 (−11.4)	34.4 (1.4)
Mean daily minimum °F (°C)	−3.0 (−19.4)	−0.9 (−18.3)	8.6 (−13.0)	18.2 (−7.7)	26.0 (−3.3)	31.1 (−0.5)	34.0 (1.1)	31.6 (−0.2)	25.0 (−3.9)	18.9 (−7.3)	9.6 (−12.4)	−2.1 (−18.9)	16.4 (−8.6)
Mean minimum °F (°C)	−27.9 (−33.3)	−24.3 (−31.3)	−12.9 (−24.9)	5.4 (−14.8)	17.0 (−8.3)	22.9 (−5.1)	27.4 (−2.6)	24.5 (−4.2)	16.7 (−8.5)	7.7 (−13.5)	−11.8 (−24.3)	−23.8 (−31.0)	−32.0 (−35.6)
Record low °F (°C)	−46 (−43)	−47 (−44)	−34 (−37)	−18 (−28)	8 (−13)	12 (−11)	15 (−9)	12 (−11)	1 (−17)	−11 (−24)	−30 (−34)	−54 (−48)	−54 (−48)
Average precipitation inches (mm)	1.80 (46)	1.44 (37)	2.02 (51)	1.69 (43)	1.67 (42)	1.48 (38)	0.62 (16)	0.55 (14)	1.01 (26)	1.60 (41)	2.00 (51)	2.32 (59)	18.20 (462)
Average snowfall inches (cm)	19.7 (50)	16.8 (43)	8.8 (22)	4.1 (10)	1.4 (3.6)	0.2 (0.51)	0.0 (0.0)	0.0 (0.0)	0.1 (0.25)	1.9 (4.8)	9.1 (23)	19.8 (50)	81.9 (207.16)
Average precipitation days (≥ 0.01 in)	8.2	7.5	5.9	5.3	5.3	4.6	2.4	1.7	2.8	4.4	6.5	7.8	62.4
Average snowy days (≥ 0.1 in)	7.6	6.2	4.8	2.7	0.8	0.1	0.0	0.0	0.1	1.2	4.5	7.1	35.1
Source 1: NOAA
Source 2: National Weather Service

Climate data for Stanley Ranger Station, Idaho, 1991–2020 normals: 6495ft (1980m)
Month	Jan	Feb	Mar	Apr	May	Jun	Jul	Aug	Sep	Oct	Nov	Dec	Year
Record high °F (°C)	50 (10)	54 (12)	65 (18)	74 (23)	84 (29)	93 (34)	95 (35)	96 (36)	93 (34)	83 (28)	68 (20)	49 (9)	96 (36)
Mean maximum °F (°C)	42.5 (5.8)	46.4 (8.0)	54.2 (12.3)	64.4 (18.0)	75.4 (24.1)	83.0 (28.3)	90.4 (32.4)	88.5 (31.4)	83.2 (28.4)	71.1 (21.7)	56.7 (13.7)	42.5 (5.8)	91.1 (32.8)
Mean daily maximum °F (°C)	29.5 (−1.4)	34.9 (1.6)	42.5 (5.8)	48.6 (9.2)	60.3 (15.7)	68.7 (20.4)	79.9 (26.6)	79.7 (26.5)	70.0 (21.1)	55.4 (13.0)	38.8 (3.8)	27.8 (−2.3)	53.0 (11.7)
Daily mean °F (°C)	16.9 (−8.4)	21.0 (−6.1)	28.3 (−2.1)	34.8 (1.6)	45.0 (7.2)	51.6 (10.9)	59.3 (15.2)	58.4 (14.7)	50.3 (10.2)	39.7 (4.3)	26.4 (−3.1)	16.8 (−8.4)	37.4 (3.0)
Mean daily minimum °F (°C)	4.4 (−15.3)	7.1 (−13.8)	14.1 (−9.9)	20.9 (−6.2)	29.7 (−1.3)	34.5 (1.4)	38.7 (3.7)	37.0 (2.8)	30.6 (−0.8)	24.1 (−4.4)	13.9 (−10.1)	5.9 (−14.5)	21.7 (−5.7)
Mean minimum °F (°C)	−22.4 (−30.2)	−20.1 (−28.9)	−10.0 (−23.3)	3.7 (−15.7)	15.9 (−8.9)	23.3 (−4.8)	28.0 (−2.2)	26.1 (−3.3)	18.4 (−7.6)	7.2 (−13.8)	−9.2 (−22.9)	−19.9 (−28.8)	−26.7 (−32.6)
Record low °F (°C)	−35 (−37)	−31 (−35)	−23 (−31)	−17 (−27)	7 (−14)	18 (−8)	23 (−5)	18 (−8)	8 (−13)	−8 (−22)	−25 (−32)	−34 (−37)	−35 (−37)
Average precipitation inches (mm)	1.74 (44)	1.32 (34)	2.20 (56)	1.69 (43)	1.49 (38)	1.60 (41)	0.63 (16)	0.48 (12)	1.01 (26)	1.59 (40)	2.19 (56)	1.92 (49)	17.86 (455)
Source 1: NOAA
Source 2: XMACIS2 (records & monthly max/mins)

== Culture and festivals ==
During the summers, the Sawtooth Mountain Mamas Craft Fair is held in the field next to the grocery store, usually for about 2–3 days in July.

A music festival, the Sawtooth Valley Gathering, also attracts a fair number of people.

=== In literature ===
An imaginative 1980 novel by Gino Sky, Appaloosa Rising: the Legend of the Cowboy Buddha, is set in the Stanley area.

A 2003 memoir by John Rember, Traplines: Coming Home to the Sawtooth Valley describes life in Stanley and its surrounding area, and the cultural changes connected to the establishment of the Sawtooth National Recreation Area.

=== In film ===
The 1985 Clint Eastwood film Pale Rider was mainly shot in the Sawtooth National Recreation Area near Stanley.

== Gallery ==
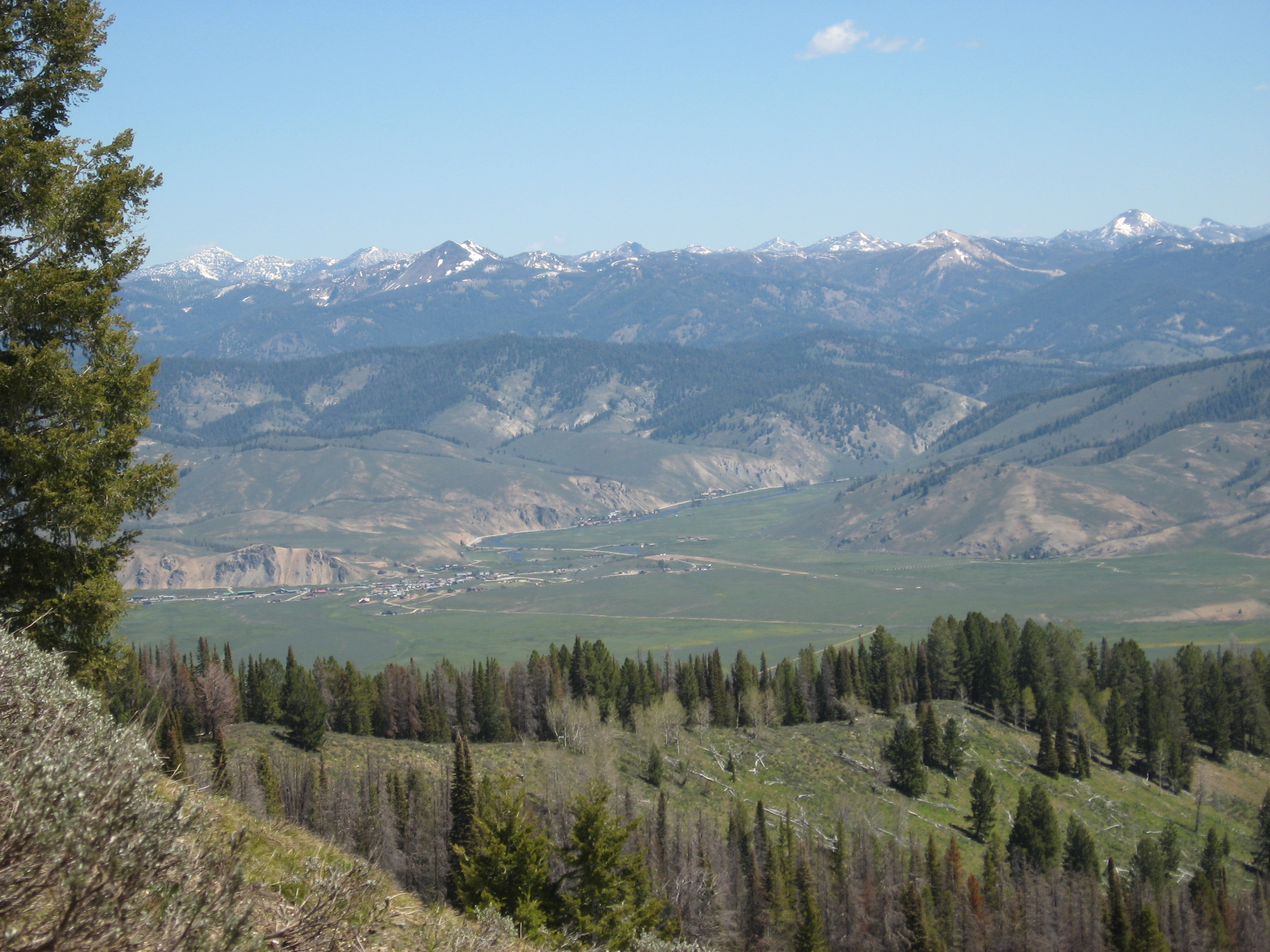
Stanley from above

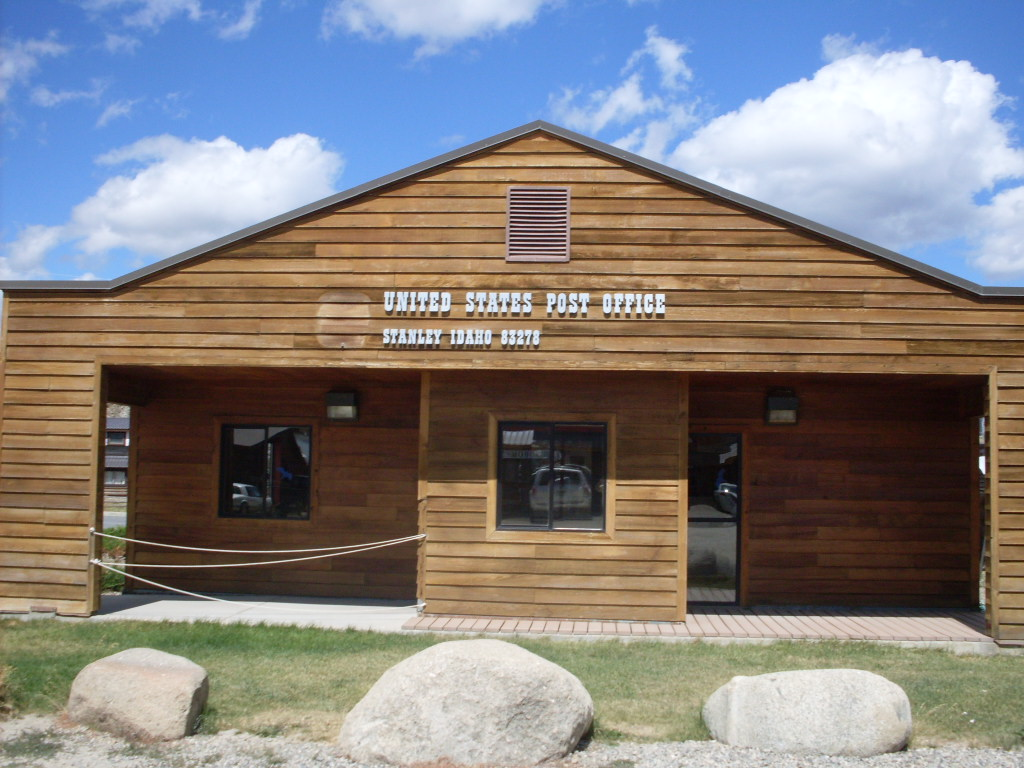
Stanley Post Office (83278)

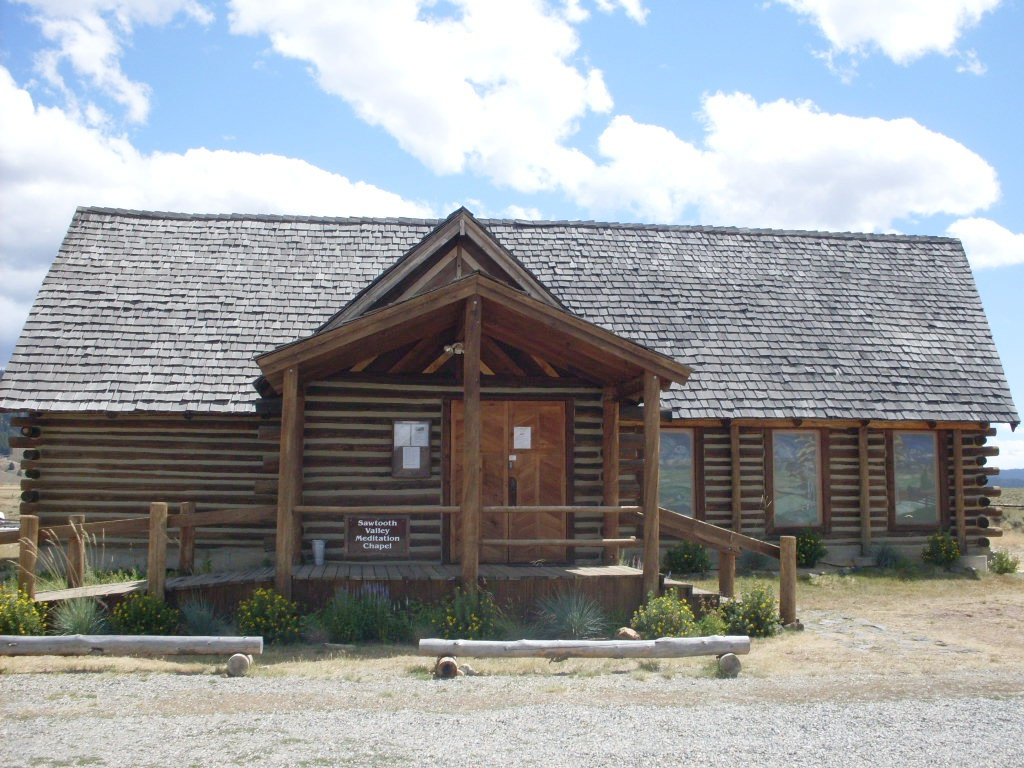
Chapel

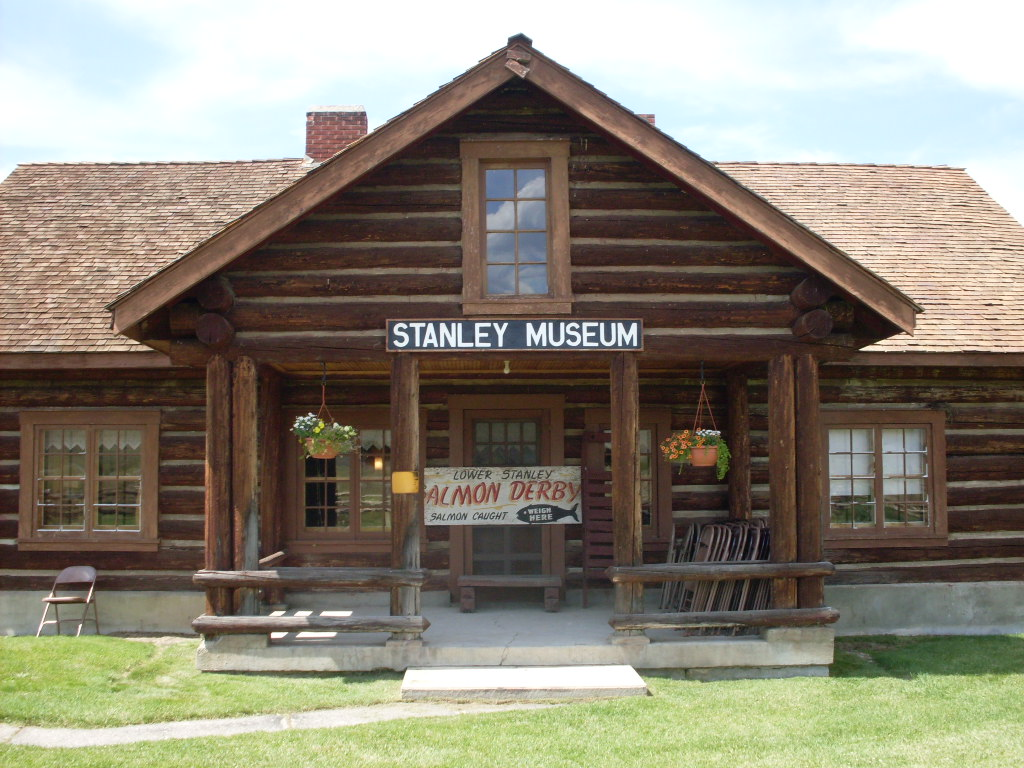
Museum
