= Soldier (disambiguation) =

A soldier is a member of an armed force, primarily one engaging on land (rather than in the air or on/in water)

Soldier(s) or The Soldier(s) also may refer to:

== Places in the United States ==
- Soldier, Idaho
- Soldier, Iowa
- Soldier, Kansas
- Soldier, Kentucky
- Soldier, Pennsylvania
- Soldier Field, football stadium in Chicago, Illinois
- Soldier Key, Florida
- Soldiers Lake, Arizona
- Soldier Lakes (Nevada)
- Soldier Mountain, a ski area in Idaho
- Soldier Mountains, Idaho
- Soldier Mountain, California
- Soldier River, Iowa
- Soldier Summit, Utah
- Soldier Township, Crawford County, Iowa
- Soldier Township, Jackson County, Kansas

== People ==
- Soldier (surname)
- Soldier (artist), Nigerian artist
- Soldier of The Salvation Army, a Salvationist who has signed the Soldier's Covenant
- Toy Soldier (Doctor Steel fan), a fan of musician and Internet personality Doctor Steel

== Arts and entertainment ==
=== Films ===
- Soldiers (film), a 1956 Soviet drama film
- The Soldier (1982 film), a Cold War action film
- Soldier (1998 American film), a science fiction film directed by Paul W.S. Anderson
- Soldier (1998 Indian film), a thriller film
- Soldier (2009 film), an Indian film directed by Vijaya Nirmala
- The Soldier, a 2011 Australian short documentary by Shark Island Productions
- The Soldier (2016 film), a Nepali film

=== Literature ===
- "The Soldier" (poem), a poem by Rupert Brooke, fifth in a series entitled 1914
- The Soldier, a 2018 novel by Neal Asher
- The Soldier, a 1960 novel by Richard P. Powell
- The Soldiers, a 1776 play by Jakob Michael Reinhold Lenz
- Soldiers: Great Stories of War and Peace, a 2021 book by Max Hastings

=== Music ===
- The Soldiers, a British singing trio, soldiers in the British Army

==== Albums ====
- Soldier (album), a 1980 album by Iggy Pop
- The Soldiers (album), an album by The Soldiers
- The Soldier (album), a 1979 Billy Higgins album

==== Songs ====
- "Soldier", a 1982 song by Payolas
- "Soldier", a 2002 song on the album The Eminem Show by Eminem
- "Soldier", a 2013 song from In a World Like This by Backstreet Boys
- "Soldier", a song on the 1970 album Twelve Dreams of Dr. Sardonicus by Spirit
- "The Soldier", by John Ireland
- "Soldier", a 2019 song by Trixie Mattel from One Stone
- "Soldier", a 2017 song by NEFFEX
- "Soldier" (Destiny's Child song)
- "Soldier" (Erykah Badu song)
- "Soldier" (Gavin DeGraw song)
- "Soldier" (Harvey Andrews song)
- "Soldier" (Neil Young song)
- "Soldier" (Samantha Jade song)
- "Soldiers" (ABBA song)
- "Soldiers" (Ulrik Munther song)
- "Soldiers" (Drowning Pool song)

=== Television ===
- "Soldier" (The Outer Limits), a 1964 The Outer Limits episode written by Harlan Ellison
- The Soldiers (American TV series), a 1955 comedy series
- The Soldiers (TV program), a military-themed reality show
- Soldiers: A History of Men in Battle, a 1985 British documentary series

=== Other arts and entertainment ===
- Soldier (Team Fortress 2), one of the classes in the video game
- Soldiers: Tactical Combat in 1914–15, a 1972 board wargame simulating the first months of World War I

== Biology ==
- Scarlet wrasse, New Zealand fish
- Soldier, a caste in eusocial animals such as ants, termites, and certain species of mole- rats
- Soldier (butterfly) (Danaus eresimus), American butterfly
- Soldier beetle
- Soldier crab (disambiguation)
- "Soldiers of the queen" or "gallant soldiers", popular names for the Galinsoga plant

== Other uses ==
- Soldier or soldato, a low-level member of an organized crime family
- Soldier (party), Canadian political party
- Soldier Magazine, an official British Army monthly publication
- Soldier course, a complete course of brickwork laid on end vertically, with the narrow side exposed in the face of the wall
- Soldier settlement (Australia), soldiers' resettlement schemes in Australia
- Soldiers (food), thin strips of toast or bread meant to be dipped into a soft-boiled egg

== See also ==
- Soldier Soldier, 1990s British television series
- Soldier Boy, the name of three superheroes in The Boys comic book and television series
- Soldat (disambiguation)
- Souldier, a 2018 album by Jain
- Soulja (disambiguation)
