= Boardman =

Boardman may refer to:

== People ==
- Boardman (surname)
- Boardman Conover (1892–1950), American soldier, salesman and amateur ornithologist
- Boardman Robinson (1876–1952), Canadian-born American painter, illustrator and cartoonist

== Places in the United States ==
- Boardman, Florida, an unincorporated community
- Boardman, North Carolina, a town
- Boardman, Ohio, a census-designated place
- Boardman, Oregon, a city
  - Boardman Airport, near the city
  - Boardman Coal Plant, a power station in Boardman
- Boardman, Wisconsin, an unincorporated community
- Boardman River, Michigan
- Boardman Township, Clayton County, Iowa
- Boardman Township, Michigan
- Boardman Township, Mahoning County, Ohio
- Mount Boardman, in the Diablo Range, California
- Boardman Creek, Camas County, Idaho
- Boardman Lake (Idaho), in the Soldier Mountains
- Boardman Peak, in the Soldier Mountains
- Boardman River, Michigan

== Other uses ==
- Boardman Bikes, a British bicycle manufacturer founded by cyclist Chris Boardman
- Boardman Books, a British publishing company
- Boardman High School (Mahoning County, Ohio), a public high school in Boardman, Ohio, United States
- Boardman Center Middle School, a public middle school in Boardman, Ohio
- Boardman House (disambiguation), various houses
- Naval Weapons Systems Training Facility Boardman, a United States Navy training range near Boardman, Oregon
- Operation Boardman, a World War II Allied deception operation
- The Boardman, a historic series of rowhouses in North Adams, Massachusetts, United States

== See also ==
- Boardman's Windmill, Norfolk, England
- Boardman Tasker Prize for Mountain Literature, a British literary award
- Bordman, a list of people with the surname
