= Skillern =

Skillern is a locational surname of British origin, derived from Skeleron in Rimington, Lancashire. Variants of the name include Skillen, Skillin, and Skilling. The name may refer to:

- Daphne Skillern (1928–2012), British police officer
- James Skillen (born 1944), American theologian
- John Skillern (1849–1934), American businessman
- Keith Skillen (1948–2013), British football player
- Rufus Skillern (born 1982), American football player

== Other uses ==
- Skillern House, Arkansas
- Skillern Peak, Idaho
- Skillen, Irland
