= Smoky Dome =

Mountain in the state of Idaho

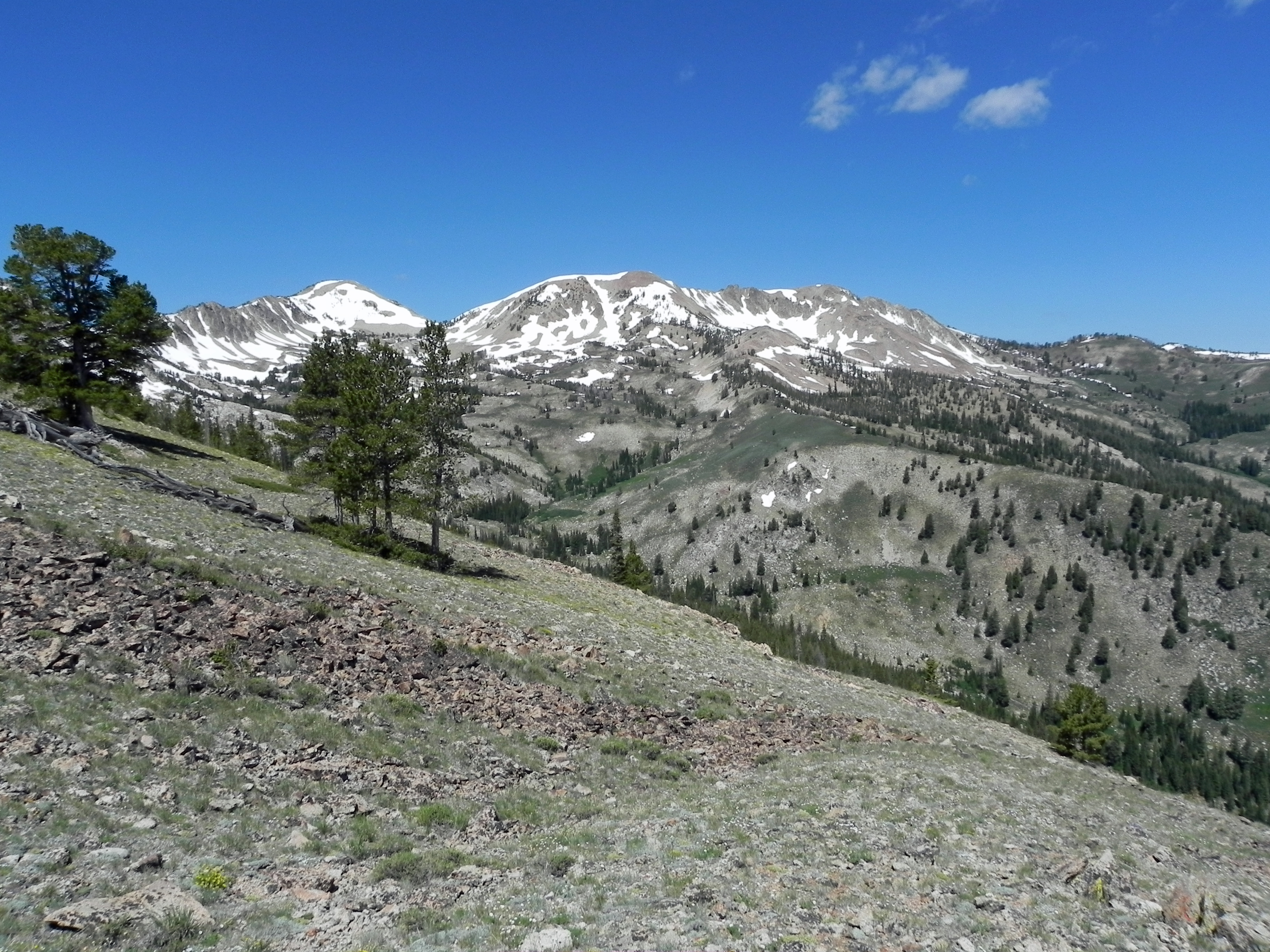
- Smoky Dome at left

Highest point
- Elevation: 10,095 ft (3,077 m) NAVD 88
- Prominence: 3,255 ft (992 m)
- Coordinates: 43°29′36″N 114°56′11″W

Geography
- Location within Idaho
- Location: Camas County, Idaho, U.S.
- Parent range: Soldier Mountains
- Topo map: USGS Smoky Dome

Climbing
- Easiest route: Simple Scrambling, class 2

Smoky Dome, at 10,095 feet (3,077 m) above sea level is the highest peak in the Soldier Mountains of Idaho. Smoky Dome is located northwest of Fairfield in Camas County and Sawtooth National Forest.

Smoky Dome rises about 5,000 feet (1,500 m) over the Camas Prairie and is the 21st most prominent peak in Idaho. Views from the summit encompass the Pioneer, Smoky, and Trinity Mountains as well as the Bennett Hills.

The primary route to Smoky Dome begins just north of the Soldier Mountain Ski Area and heads west up and old dirt road that is now trail 087. The route then turns onto trail 185 as it crosses the South Fork of Soldier Creek. Once on the ridge above the ski area, follow the trail along the ridge until it ends below and to the northeast of the second peak. Continue to follow the ridge up the second and third peaks until you reach Smoky Dome. There are numerous other routes possible.

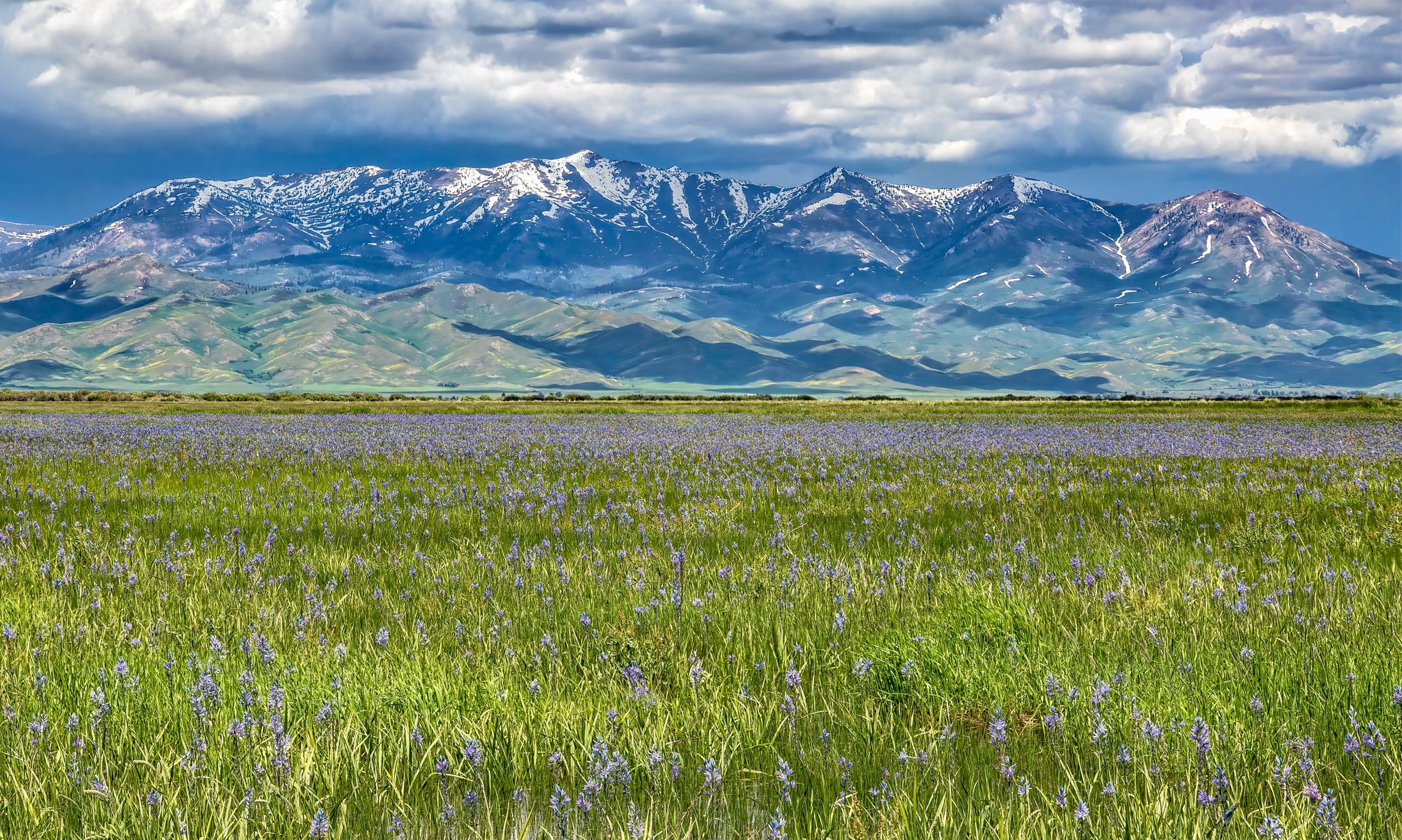
South aspect of Smoky Dome viewed from Camas Prairie

The northern slopes of Smoky Dome are drained by Boardman Creek, a tributary of the South Fork Boise River. The four Smoky Dome Lakes, Lower, Upper 1, Upper 2, and West Smoky Dome Lakes are northwest of the peak. Boardman Peak and Iron Mountain are both northwest of Smoky Dome.
