= Boardman (surname) =

Boardman is a surname. Notable people with the name include:

- Allan Boardman (1937–2018), British physicist
- Andrea Boardman (born 1967), English television presenter
- Andrew Boardman (1550–1639), English clergyman
- Ben Boardman (1899–1968), English footballer
- Chris Boardman (born 1968), British cyclist
- Christopher Boardman (1903–1987), British sailor
- David Sherman Boardman (1786–1864), American lawyer, judge, and politician
- Dixon Boardman (1880–1954), American track and field athlete
- Douglass Boardman (1822–1891), American jurist and lawyer
- Edward Boardman (1833–1910), English architect
- Eileen Boardman (c. 1942–2018), American statistician
- Eleanor Boardman (1898–1991), American film actress
- Elijah Boardman (1760–1823), American politician
- George Boardman (missionary) (1801–1831), American missionary to Burma
- George Boardman the Younger (1828–1903), American theologian
- Halsey J. Boardman (1834–??), American politician
- Harold Boardman (1907–1994), British politician
- Harry Boardman (1930–1987), English folk singer
- Humphrey Boardman (1904–1998), English rower
- John Boardman (physicist) (1932–2025), American physicist, author and game authority
- John Boardman (art historian) (1927–2024), British art historian and archaeologist
- John Boardman (merchant) (1758–1813), early settler of Troy, New York
- John Joseph Boardman (1893–1978), American Roman Catholic bishop
- Jon Boardman (born 1981), English footballer
- Joseph H. Boardman (1948–2019), American government official
- Josephine Porter Boardman (1873–1972), American philanthropist
- Larry Boardman (born 1936), American boxer
- Lee Boardman (born 1972), English actor
- Leslie Boardman (1889–1975), Australian freestyle swimmer
- Mabel Thorp Boardman (1860–1946), American philanthropist
- Michael Boardman (1938–2021), British mathematician
- Mickey Boardman, American writer, socialite, and media personality
- Paul Boardman (born 1967), British television presenter
- Paul Harris Boardman, American film producer and screenwriter
- Peter Boardman (1950–1982), British mountain climber
- Russell Boardman (1898–1933), American aviator
- Sarah Hall Boardman (1803–1845), American missionary to Burma
- Seymour Boardman (1921–2005), New York abstract expressionist painter
- Stan Boardman (born 1937), English comedian
- Steve Boardman (historian), Scottish medieval historian
- Steve Boardman (soccer) (born 1964), retired American soccer defender
- Thomas Volney Boardman, American businessman
- Tom Boardman, Baron Boardman (1919–2003), British politician and businessman
- Tom Boardman (racing driver) (born 1983), British racing driver
- True Boardman (1882–1918), American film actor
- Truman Boardman (1810–1895), New York politician
- Virginia True Boardman (1889–1971), American actress
- William Boardman (1810–1886), American pastor, teacher, and author
- William K. Boardman (1915–1993), American politician
- William Whiting Boardman (1794–1871), American politician

== See also ==
- Senator Boardman (disambiguation)
- Bordman, another surname
