= Boardman Peak =

Mountain in the state of Idaho

- Location within Idaho

Highest point
- Elevation: 9,457 ft (2,882 m) NAVD 88
- Prominence: 687 ft (209 m)
- Coordinates: 43°30′48″N 114°59′43″W

Geography
- Location: Camas County, Idaho, U.S.
- Parent range: Soldier Mountains
- Topo map: USGS Boardman Creek

Climbing
- Easiest route: Simple Scrambling, class 2

Boardman Peak, at 9,457 feet (2,882 m) high is one of the peaks of the Soldier Mountains of Idaho. Boardman Peak is located at the center of the range southeast of Iron Mountain, northwest of Smoky Dome, and northwest of Fairfield in Camas County and Sawtooth National Forest. No trails go to the summit, but several pass near the peak, and the ascent is only class 2.

Boardman Peak has over 300 feet (91 m) prominence and is west of Boardman Pass.

The northern slopes of Boardman Peak are drained by Boardman Creek, a tributary of the South Fork Boise River, and the south slopes are drained by Salt Log and Bremner Creeks, tributaries of the South Fork of Lime Creek. Boardman Lake, while not directly below the peak, is northwest of the mountain.

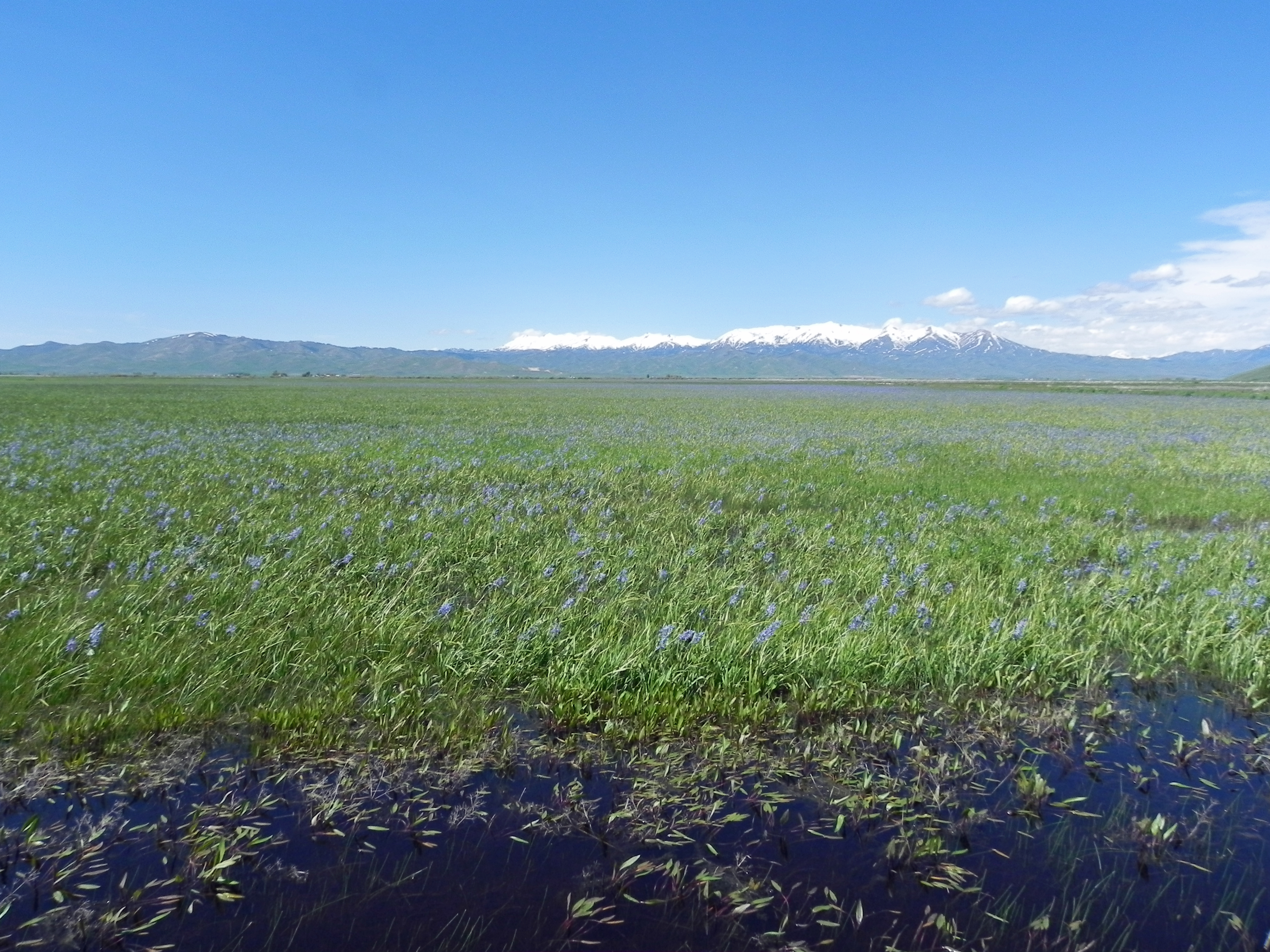
Soldier Mountains from Camas Prairie Centennial Marsh
