= Lower Deadwood Lake =

Lake in Camas County, Idaho, United States

- Location within Idaho Location within the United States
- Location: Camas County, Idaho
- Coordinates: 43°31′47″N 115°01′44″W
- Type: Glacial
- Primary outflows: Deadwood Creek to South Fork Boise River
- Basin countries: United States
- Max. length: 160 m (520 ft)
- Max. width: 88 m (289 ft)
- Surface elevation: 2,670 m (8,760 ft)

Lower Deadwood Lake is an alpine lake in Camas County, Idaho, United States, located in the Soldier Mountains in the Sawtooth National Forest. While no trails lead to the lake, the lake is east of Iron Mountain, which has an old Forest Service lookout on the top.

== See also ==
- Sawtooth National Forest
- Soldier Mountains
