= John Skillern House =

Historic house in Idaho, United States

- U.S. National Register of Historic Places
- Location within Idaho Location within the United States
- Nearest city: Fairfield, Idaho
- Coordinates: 43°37′02″N 114°51′51″W
- Area: 10 acres (4.0 ha)
- Built: 1921
- Architectural style: Rustic
- NRHP reference No.: 84001111
- Added to NRHP: May 14, 1984

The John Skillern House is a historic cabin located 25 miles (40 km) northwest of Fairfield in Camas County, Idaho, near the confluence of the Big Smokey and Little Smokey creeks. The cabin was built in 1921-22 for John Skillern and his wife, who used it as a summer home and headquarters for John's large sheep ranching business. Skillern's wife based the cabin's rustic design off of the Old Faithful Inn in Yellowstone National Park, which is reflected in the cabin's steep roof and covered front porch. The cabin's other significant rustic features include its sleeping lofts with pole railings, its horizontal log construction with exposed logs on the inner walls, and its stone chimney.

The cabin was added to the National Register of Historic Places on May 14, 1984.

== See also ==
- List of National Historic Landmarks in Idaho
- National Register of Historic Places listings in Camas County, Idaho
