= Upper Smoky Dome Lake 1 =

Alpine lake in the state of Idaho

Upper Somky Dome Lake 1
- Location within Idaho Location within the United States
- Location: Camas County, Idaho
- Coordinates: 43.501520°N 114.954222°W
- Type: Glacial
- Primary outflows: Boardman Creek to South Fork Boise River
- Basin countries: United States
- Max. length: 98 m (322 ft)
- Max. width: 36 m (118 ft)
- Surface elevation: 2,800 m (9,200 ft)

Upper Smoky Dome Lake 1 is an alpine lake in Camas County, Idaho, United States, located in the Soldier Mountains in the Sawtooth National Forest. No trails lead to the lake, and it is in the Smoky Dome Lakes basin northeast of Smoky Dome, which is the highest peak in the Soldier Mountains.

== See also ==
- Sawtooth National Forest
- Soldier Mountains
