= Skillen =

Skillen is a surname. Notable people with the surname include:

- James Skillen, American Christian philosopher and author
- Keith Skillen (1948–2013), English footballer
