= Corral, Idaho =

Unincorporated community in Idaho, United States

Corral
- Unincorporated community
- Location within the state of Idaho
- Coordinates: 43°20′39″N 114°56′57″W
- Country: United States
- State: Idaho
- County: Camas
- Elevation: 5,099 ft (1,554 m)
- Time zone: UTC-7 (Mountain (MST))
  - Summer (DST): UTC-6 (MDT)
- ZIP codes: 83322
- GNIS feature ID: 372129

Corral is an unincorporated community in southwestern Camas County, Idaho, United States. It lies along U.S. Route 20 west of the city of Fairfield, the county seat of Camas County. Although Corral is unincorporated, it has a post office, with the ZIP code of 83322.

== History ==
Settlement at Corral commenced around 1886. On November 30, 1886, Robert L. Hicks transferred property on Corral Creek to H.F. McCarter. McCarter moved his family and commenced farming on the property. By 1891, a school was located on the property, but later demolished upon construction of two new school buildings.

Corral's population was 40 in 1909, and was estimated at 20 in 1960.

== Climate ==
This climatic region is typified by large seasonal temperature differences, with warm to hot (and often humid) summers and cold (sometimes severely cold) winters. According to the Köppen Climate Classification system, Corral has a humid continental climate, abbreviated "Dfb" on climate maps.
