= Soldat =

Soldat transl. Soldier (in Danish, German, French, Norwegian, Romanian, and Swedish), plural Soldats (in French) Soldaten (in German) Soldater (in Danish, Norwegian, and Swedish), may refer to:

- Soldat (horse)
- Soldat (rank), lowest rank of enlisted men in the land-based armed forces of Germany, Austria, Romania, Ukraine, and Switzerland
- "Soldat" (song), by Aya Nakamura
- Soldat (video game)
- Soldat Island, Australian Antarctic Territory
- Soldat Jahman (born 1979), French hip hop performer
- Soldat Ustinov (born 1960), ring name of American professional wrestler
- Soldaten (Gurlitt), opera by Manfred Gurlitt 1930
- Die Soldaten, opera by Zimmermann 1965
- Ihor Soldat (born 1991), Ukrainian football defender
- Marie Soldat-Roeger (1863–1955), Austrian violinist
- Der Soldat (Mirko Jelusich), novel by the Austrian Nazi Party author Mirko Jelusich 1939
- Die Soldaten (play), (de) play by Jakob Michael Reinhold Lenz 1776

== See also ==
- Soldier (disambiguation)
