= Deadwood Creek =

- Location within Idaho Location within the United States

Location
- Country: United States
- State: Idaho
- Region: Camas County

Physical characteristics
- Source: Soldier Mountains
  - location: Camas County
  - coordinates: 43°31′46″N 115°1′44″W
  - elevation: 8,760 ft (2,670 m)
- Mouth: South Fork Boise River
  - location: Camas County
  - coordinates: 43°35′8″N 115°0′27″W
  - elevation: 5,125 ft (1,562 m)

Deadwood Creek is a stream in the Sawtooth National Forest in Camas County, Idaho in the United States. It is a tributary of the South Fork Boise River, which in turn is a tributary to the Snake River and Columbia River.

Deadwood Creek originates in the Soldier Mountains, then flows north to the South Fork of the Boise River. Trails 054 and 091 follow Deadwood Creek for much of its length, although there is no bridge at the stream's mouth to cross the South Fork of the Boise River to reach forest road 227.

Heart Lake is a small alpine lake found in the uppermost reaches of the Deadwood Creek watershed. Deadwood Creek drains the northern slopes of Iron Mountain as well as Lower and Upper Deadwood Lakes.
