= Camas Prairie Centennial Marsh Wildlife Management Area =

Wildlife management area in Idaho, US

- IUCN category IV (habitat/species management area)
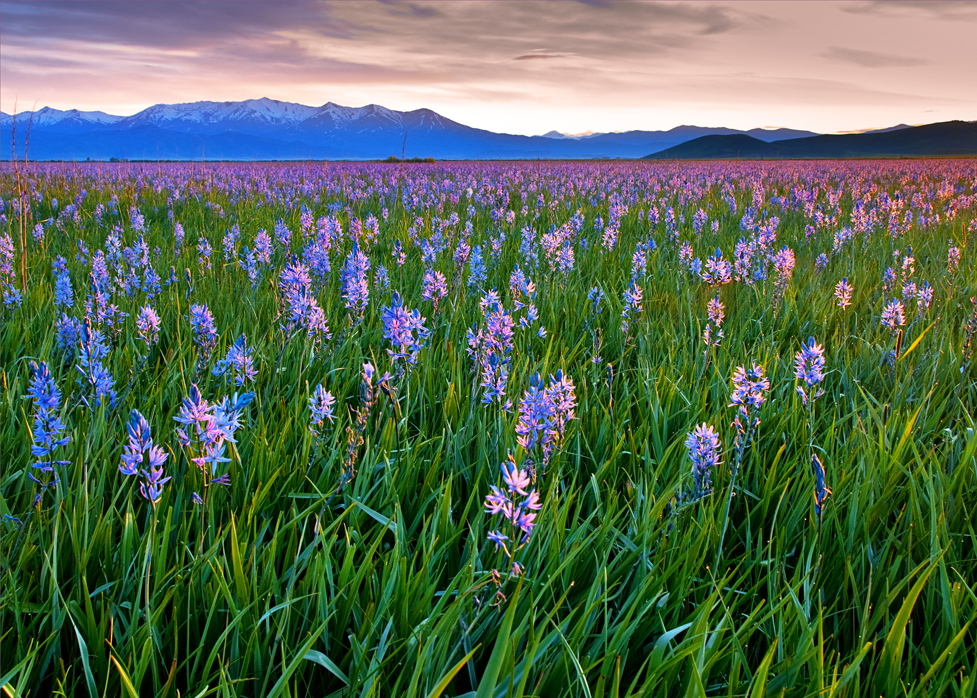
- Camas Prairie Centennial Marsh

- Location within Idaho
- Location: Camas County, Idaho, United States
- Nearest city: Fairfield, ID
- Coordinates: 43.289343°N 115.018402°W
- Area: 3,100 acres (12.5 km^{2})
- Established: 1987
- Governing body: Idaho Department of Fish and Game
- Website: idfg.idaho.gov/visit/wma/camas-prairie-centennial-marsh

Camas Prairie Centennial Marsh Wildlife Management Area at 3,100 acres (13 km^{2}) is an Idaho wildlife management area in Camas County south of the community of Hill City. The WMA is at the base of the Bennett Hills on the Camas Prairie south of the Soldier Mountains and Sawtooth National Forest. The Idaho Department of Fish and Game acquired the land in 1987 with the help of Ducks Unlimited and The Nature Conservancy to provide quality wetland and upland habitat for migratory and resident wildlife.

The flat tableland on the prairie creates a large floodplain for Camas Creek, flooding the Camas Prairie to a depth of less than 12 in (30 cm) during spring runoff, but it is often dry by mid-July. The shallow water provides habitat for emergent vegetation predominantly Carex and Juncus species.

Camas lilies bloom beginning in late May, and the area attracts many birds, including Canada geese, mallards, gadwalls, American wigeons, northern pintails, northern shovelers, lesser scaup, canvasbacks, redheads, ruddy ducks, and blue-winged, green-winged, and cinnamon teals. Gray partridge and sage grouse are found in upland areas, and there are a variety of other birds species found at the WMA.

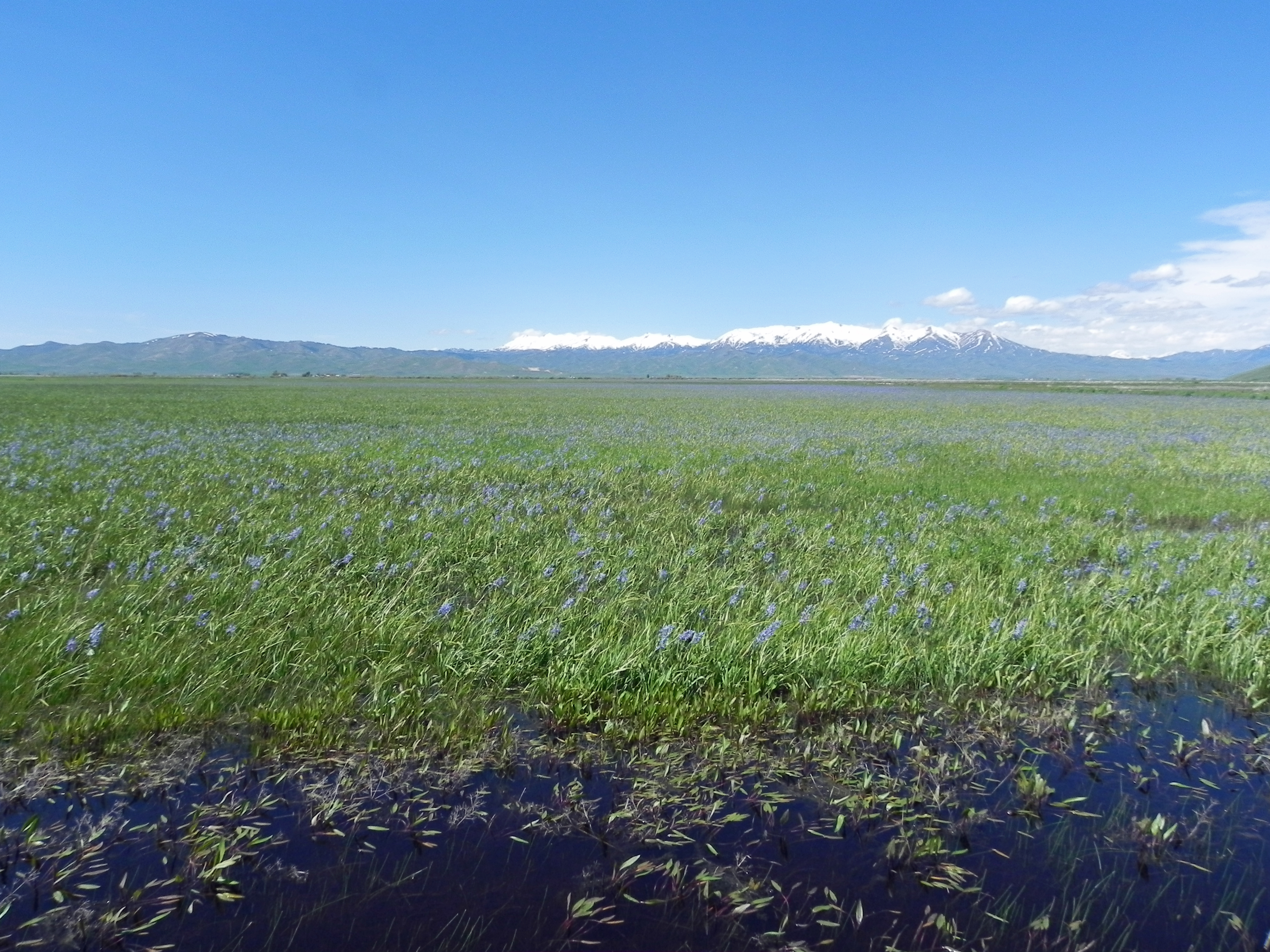

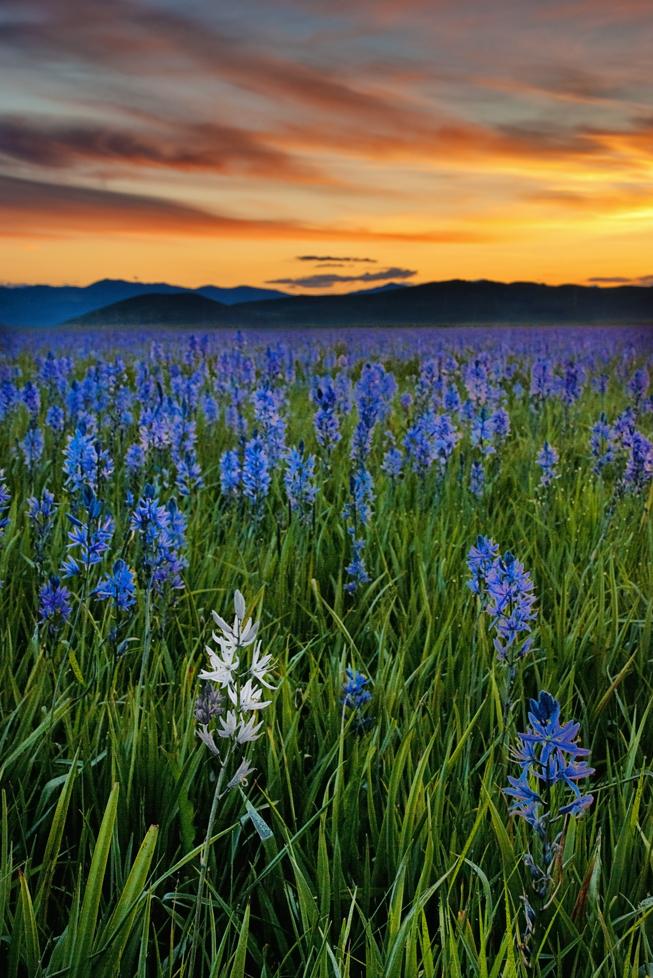

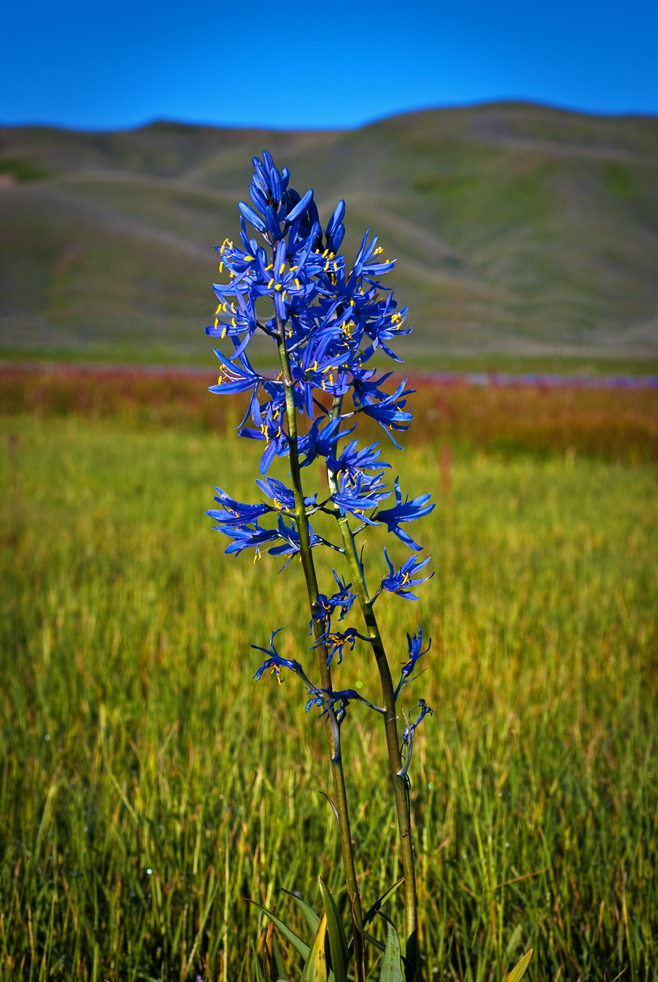
