= West Smoky Dome Lake =

Alpine lake in the state of Idaho

West Somky Dome Lake
- Location within Idaho Location within the United States
- Location: Camas County, Idaho
- Coordinates: 43.509335°N 114.957672°W
- Type: Glacial
- Primary outflows: Boardman Creek to South Fork Boise River
- Basin countries: United States
- Max. length: 52 m (171 ft)
- Max. width: 46 m (151 ft)
- Surface elevation: 2,675 m (8,776 ft)

West Smoky Dome Lake is an alpine lake in Camas County, Idaho, United States, located in the Soldier Mountains in the Sawtooth National Forest. No trails lead to the lake, and it is in the Smoky Dome Lakes basin northeast of Smoky Dome, which is the highest peak in the Soldier Mountains.

== See also ==
- Sawtooth National Forest
- Soldier Mountains
