= Hill City, Idaho =

Unincorporated community in the state of Idaho, United States

Hill City
- Unincorporated community
- Location within the state of Idaho
- Coordinates: 43°18′02″N 115°03′04″W
- Country: United States
- State: Idaho
- County: Camas
- Elevation: 5,099 ft (1,554 m)

Population (2020)
  - Total: 26
- Time zone: UTC-7 (Mountain (MST))
  - Summer (DST): UTC-6 (MDT)
- ZIP codes: 83337
- Area code: 208
- GNIS feature ID: 383196
- Website: None

Hill City is an unincorporated community in southwestern Camas County, Idaho, United States.

It lies at the intersection of U.S. Route 20 with Mink and Swamp Roads and Trader Lane, 14 miles (22½ km) west-southwest of Fairfield, the county seat.

== History ==
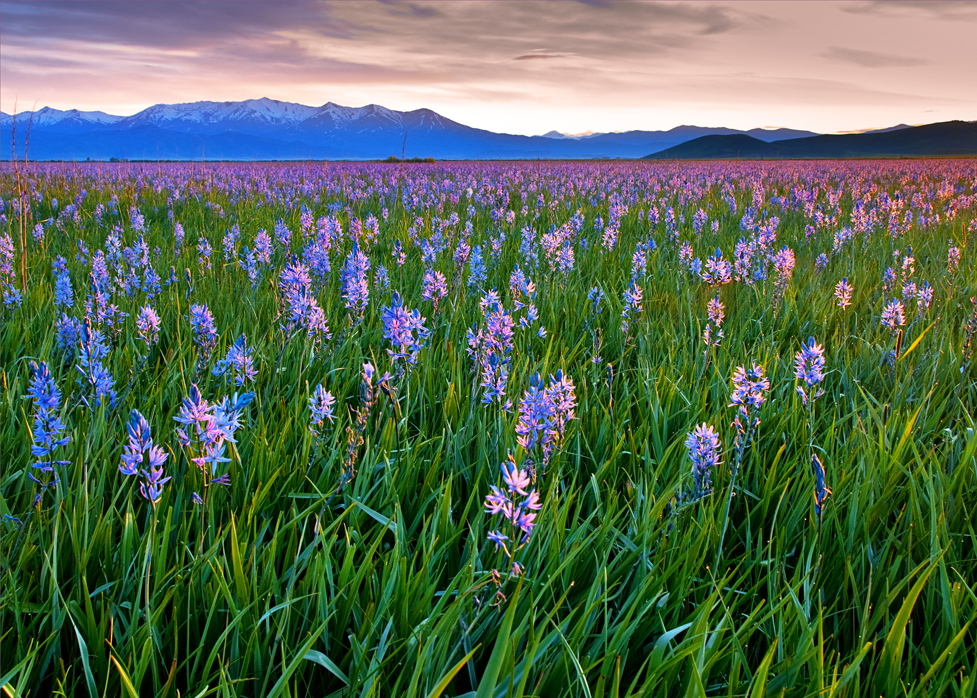
Sunrise at Camas Prairie Centennial Park, near Hill City

Hill City was named for the Bennet Mountain Hills, located nearby, and in 1911, Hill City became the a major station on the Oregon Short Line Railroad. From Hill City and the surrounding Camas Prairie, astonishing numbers of sheep were shipped. At one time, more sheep were shipped from Hill City than anywhere else in the world.

Hill City's population was 30 in 1960.

There were also many grain elevators in the area. There is a historic saloon, reopened in 2013. It was closed down, purchased in 2019 by Jim and Tina Rice, and then removed.

The elevation of Hill City is 5,090 feet (1,551 m) above sea level.

== Climate ==
Climate data for Hill City 1 W, Idaho, 1991–2020 normals, 1915-2020 extremes: 5100ft (1554m)
Month	Jan	Feb	Mar	Apr	May	Jun	Jul	Aug	Sep	Oct	Nov	Dec	Year
Record high °F (°C)	50 (10)	59 (15)	70 (21)	83 (28)	91 (33)	98 (37)	102 (39)	100 (38)	98 (37)	85 (29)	73 (23)	59 (15)	102 (39)
Mean maximum °F (°C)	40.2 (4.6)	42.9 (6.1)	54.9 (12.7)	70.3 (21.3)	80.1 (26.7)	87.3 (30.7)	95.7 (35.4)	93.5 (34.2)	87.3 (30.7)	77.7 (25.4)	56.7 (13.7)	42.3 (5.7)	92.5 (33.6)
Mean daily maximum °F (°C)	29.0 (−1.7)	31.8 (−0.1)	42.1 (5.6)	54.3 (12.4)	64.9 (18.3)	74.5 (23.6)	85.2 (29.6)	85.1 (29.5)	75.7 (24.3)	60.6 (15.9)	43.1 (6.2)	30.4 (−0.9)	56.4 (13.6)
Daily mean °F (°C)	19.1 (−7.2)	21.8 (−5.7)	31.4 (−0.3)	41.5 (5.3)	50.0 (10.0)	57.4 (14.1)	66.0 (18.9)	64.9 (18.3)	56.3 (13.5)	44.4 (6.9)	31.4 (−0.3)	20.5 (−6.4)	42.1 (5.6)
Mean daily minimum °F (°C)	9.2 (−12.7)	11.7 (−11.3)	20.8 (−6.2)	28.8 (−1.8)	35.1 (1.7)	40.3 (4.6)	46.8 (8.2)	44.8 (7.1)	36.9 (2.7)	28.1 (−2.2)	19.6 (−6.9)	10.6 (−11.9)	27.7 (−2.4)
Mean minimum °F (°C)	−14.7 (−25.9)	−13.2 (−25.1)	−0.1 (−17.8)	15.9 (−8.9)	22.7 (−5.2)	26.1 (−3.3)	35.6 (2.0)	31.5 (−0.3)	23.1 (−4.9)	10.1 (−12.2)	−3.2 (−19.6)	−12.5 (−24.7)	−20.2 (−29.0)
Record low °F (°C)	−44 (−42)	−40 (−40)	−26 (−32)	−8 (−22)	14 (−10)	19 (−7)	21 (−6)	21 (−6)	8 (−13)	−10 (−23)	−23 (−31)	−49 (−45)	−49 (−45)
Average precipitation inches (mm)	2.06 (52)	1.22 (31)	1.17 (30)	1.20 (30)	1.28 (33)	0.80 (20)	0.47 (12)	0.24 (6.1)	0.52 (13)	1.05 (27)	1.26 (32)	2.72 (69)	13.99 (355.1)
Average snowfall inches (cm)	27.6 (70)	13.4 (34)	5.3 (13)	1.8 (4.6)	0.0 (0.0)	0.0 (0.0)	0.0 (0.0)	0.0 (0.0)	0.0 (0.0)	0.5 (1.3)	8.3 (21)	27.2 (69)	84.1 (212.9)
Source 1: NOAA
Source 2: XMACIS2 (1991-2006 snowfall, records & monthly max/mins)

== See also ==
- Camas Prairie Centennial Marsh Wildlife Management Area
