= Heart Lake (Soldier Mountains) =

Lake in the Soldier Mountains of Idaho

- Location within Idaho Location within the United States
- Location: Camas County, Idaho
- Coordinates: 43°32′43″N 115°02′25″W
- Lake type: Glacial
- Primary outflows: Deadwood Creek to South Fork Boise River
- Basin countries: United States
- Max. length: 305 m (1,001 ft)
- Max. width: 182 m (597 ft)
- Surface elevation: 2,545 m (8,350 ft)

Heart Lake is an alpine lake in Camas County, Idaho, United States, located in the Soldier Mountains in the Sawtooth National Forest. While no trails lead to the lake, the lake is north of Iron Mountain, which has an old Forest Service lookout on the top.

== See also ==
- Sawtooth National Forest
- Soldier Mountains
