= National Register of Historic Places listings in Camas County, Idaho =

Location of Camas County in Idaho

This is a detailed table of the National Register of Historic Places listing in Camas County, Idaho.

This is intended to be a detailed table of the property on the National Register of Historic Places in Camas County, Idaho, United States. Latitude and longitude coordinates are provided for many National Register properties and districts; this may be seen in a map.

There is 1 property listed on the National Register in the county. More may be added; properties and districts nationwide are added to the Register weekly.

This National Park Service list is complete through NPS recent listings posted May 23, 2025.

== Current listings ==
	Name on the Register	Image	Date listed	Location	City or town	Description
1	John Skillern House		May 14, 1984 (#84001111)	Northwest of Fairfield; 43°37′02″N 114°51′51″W	Fairfield	

== See also ==
- List of National Historic Landmarks in Idaho
- National Register of Historic Places listings in Idaho
