= Soldier, Idaho =

Unincorporated community in the state of Idaho, United States

- Unincorporated community
- Location within Idaho Location within the United States
- Coordinates: 43°22′13″N 114°47′30″W
- Country: United States
- State: Idaho
- County: Camas
- Elevation: 5,115 ft (1,559 m)
- Time zone: UTC-7 (Mountain (MST))
  - Summer (DST): UTC-6 (MDT)
- Area codes: 208, 986
- GNIS feature ID: 397181

Soldier is an unincorporated community in Camas County, Idaho, United States. The community of Soldier is 1.6 miles (2.6 km) north of Fairfield.
