= Soulja =

Soulja or Souljah may refer to:

== People ==
- Sister Souljah (born 1964), American author, activist, musician, and film producer
- SoulJa (rapper) (born 1983), Japanese rapper from Tokyo
- Soulja Boy (born 1990), American rapper
- Soulja Slim (1977–2003), American rapper

== Other ==
- A bastardization of the word "soldier"
- A compound word, alluding to "soul" and "Jah"

== See also ==
- Soldier (disambiguation)
