= Iron Mountain (Idaho) =

Mountain in the state of Idaho

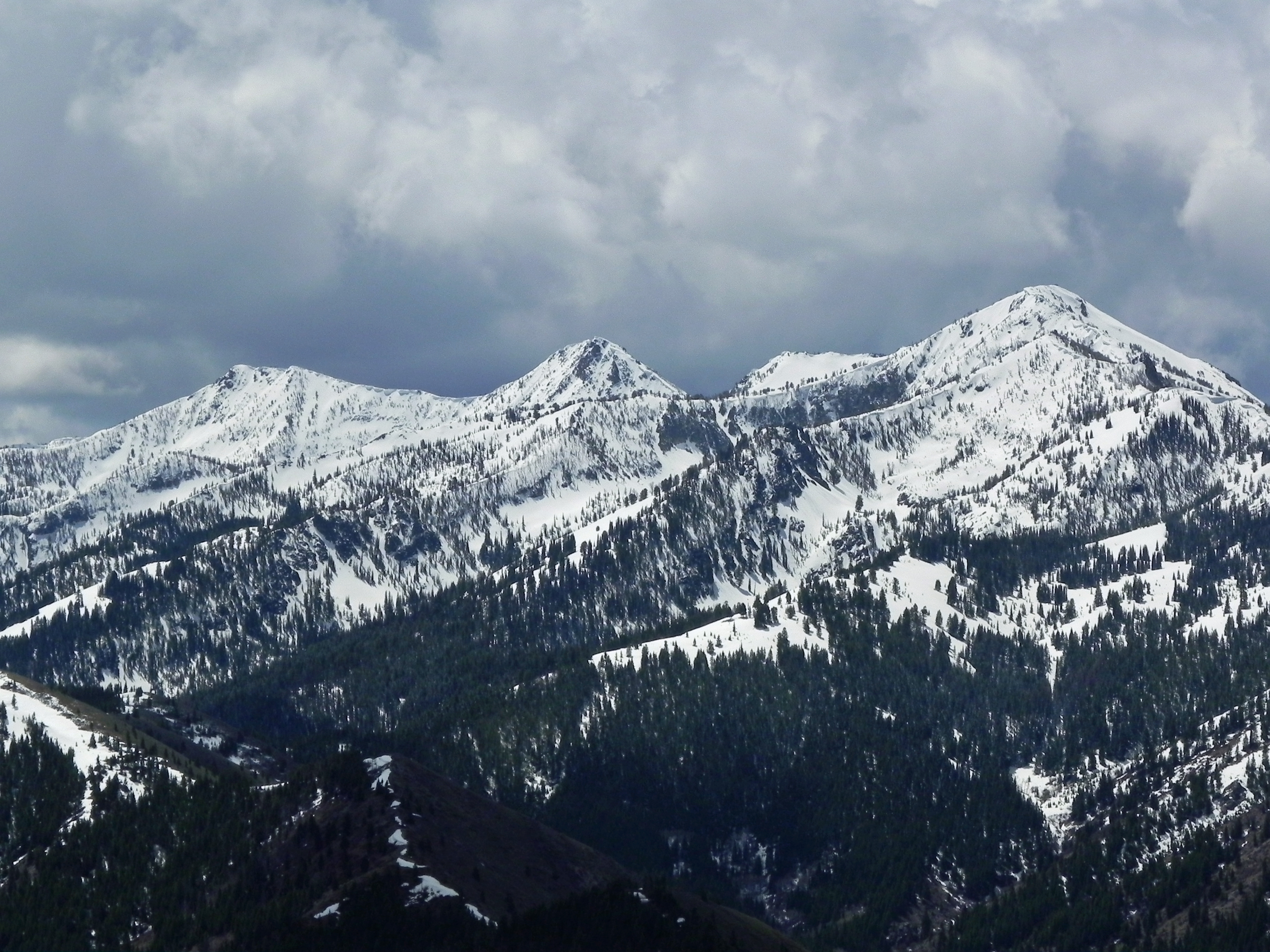
- Iron Mountain at right

Highest point
- Elevation: 9,694 ft (2,955 m) NAVD 88
- Prominence: 514 ft (157 m)
- Coordinates: 43°32′17″N 115°02′41″W

Geography
- Location within Idaho
- Location: Camas County, Idaho, U.S.
- Parent range: Soldier Mountains
- Topo map: USGS Jumbo Mountain

Climbing
- Easiest route: Simple Scrambling, class 2

Iron Mountain, at 9,694 feet (2,955 m) high is one of the peaks of the Soldier Mountains of Idaho. Iron Mountain is located at the west end of the range northwest of Fairfield in Camas County and Sawtooth National Forest.

While only a class 2 ascent, the primary route up Iron Mountain is 11 miles (18 km) one way. The primary trail to the summit is open to use by two wheel motorized off-road vehicles. An old Forest Service fire lookout can be found on the summit.

The northern slopes of Iron Mountain are drained by Deadwood Creek, a tributary of the South Fork Boise River. Heart Lake is just north-northeast of Iron Mountain while Upper Deadwood Lake is southeast of the peak. Iron Mountain is northwest of Boardman Peak.
