= Center for Public Justice =

American Christian think tank

The Center for Public Justice is an American Christian think tank which undertakes to bring a Christian worldview to bear on policy issues.

It is rooted in the Christian democratic political tradition of such Dutch figures as Guillaume Groen van Prinsterer, Abraham Kuyper, and Herman Dooyeweerd. James W. Skillen, who served as the organization's first Executive Director (1981–2000) and later President (2000–2008) has had an important influence on the organization. Since July 2011 the organization has been headed by CEO Stephanie Summers. Gideon Strauss, a former interpreter with South Africa's Truth and Reconciliation Commission and adviser to the group that drafted the 1996 Constitution of the Republic of South Africa, was CEO prior to Summers and presently is a Senior Fellow.

== History ==
Founded in 1977 as the Association for Public Justice, the board of trustees renamed the organization in 1990. It is located in Washington, D.C.

== Fellows ==
Fellows of the Center for Public Justice include Richard A. Baer Jr. (Professor Emeritus, Cornell University), Stanley W. Carlson-Thies (President, Institutional Religious Freedom Alliance), Charles L. Glenn (Professor, Boston University), Stephen Monsma (Research Fellow, Henry Institute for the Study of Christianity and Politics, Calvin College), and Harold Dean Trulear (Associate Professor, Howard University School of Divinity).

== Views ==
The Center for Public Justice has argued there is a biblical basis for a positive role for the political process and public officials.

== Work ==
The Center for Public Justice has a few different initiatives, including Families Valued, Institutional Religious Freedom Alliance, Shared Justice, and Sacred Sector.

The Center for Public Justice has been involved in the promotion of the Charitable choice provisions of the Welfare Reform Act of 1996 since 1994 and, particularly through the efforts of former senior fellow Stanley W. Carlson-Thies, was an early advocate for the ideas that eventually led to the creation of the White House Office of Faith-Based and Neighborhood Partnerships.

In 2010 the Center for Public Justice sponsored a panel series on Immigration Reform in partnership with Nyack College’s Institute for Public Service & Policy Development, the Institute for Global Engagement, the National Association of Evangelicals, and the National Hispanic Christian Leadership Conference. They have publicly advocated what they believe is a just model of immigration reform.

In response to the 2011 budget crisis, the Center for Public Justice released a "A Call for Intergenerational Justice: A Christian Proposal for the American Debt Crisis" in conjunction with the group Evangelicals for Social Action. Signers of the document included Michael Gerson, Richard Mouw, Ron Sider, and Stephanie Summers.

CPJ is a member of the Faith for Just Lending Coalition which "is seeking to increase awareness of predatory lending and to motivate individuals, lenders, churches and the government to help bring an end to the practice."

CPJ has supported the Fairness for All act, which supports which both prohibits discrimination because of sex or sexual identity as well as providing religious freedom protections, since its first introduction by Congressman Chris Stewart in 2019.

Since 1996, the Center for Public Justice has published a weekly online journal, Capital Commentary.

== See also ==
- Cardus
