= Boardman Creek =

- Location within Idaho Location within the United States

Location
- Country: United States
- State: Idaho
- Region: Camas County

Physical characteristics
- Source: Soldier Mountains
  - location: Camas County
  - coordinates: 43°31′30″N 115°1′5″W
  - elevation: 8,765 ft (2,672 m)
- Mouth: South Fork Boise River
  - location: Camas County
  - coordinates: 43°36′44″N 114°56′21″W
  - elevation: 5,315 ft (1,620 m)

Boardman Creek is a stream in the Sawtooth National Forest in Camas County, Idaho in the United States. It is a tributary of the South Fork Boise River, which in turn is a tributary to the Snake River and Columbia River.

Boardman Creek originates in the Soldier Mountains, then flows north to the South Fork of the Boise River. At Boardman Creek's mouth a foot bridge crosses the South Fork of the Boise River from Sawtooth National Forest road 227. Trail 091 follows the creek for much of its length while other trails and forest road 010 are found in the upper portions of the creek's watershed.

Boardman Lake is a small alpine lake found in the uppermost reaches of the Boardman Creek watershed. Boardman Creek drains the northern slopes of Smoky Dome, the highest peak in the Soldier Mountains, as well as Boardman Peak and the four Smoky Dome Lakes, Lower, Upper 1, Upper 2, and West Smoky Dome Lakes.
