= Boardman Lake (Idaho) =

Lake in the Soldier Mountains

- Location within Idaho Location within the United States
- Location: Camas County, Idaho
- Coordinates: 43.525087°N 115.018087°W
- Lake type: Glacial
- Primary outflows: Boardman Creek to South Fork Boise River
- Basin countries: United States
- Max. length: 106 m (348 ft)
- Max. width: 75 m (246 ft)
- Surface elevation: 2,670 m (8,760 ft)

Boardman Lake is an alpine lake in Camas County, Idaho, United States, located in the Soldier Mountains in the Sawtooth National Forest. While no trails lead to the lake, it can be most easily accessed from trail 091. The lake is north of Boardman Peak.

== See also ==
- Sawtooth National Forest
- Soldier Mountains
