= Bordman =

Bordman is a surname. Notable people with the surname include:

- Andrew Bordman (c. 1550–1639), English clergyman
- Gerald Bordman (1931–2011), American theatre historian
- Sam Bordman
