= Independent candidates in the 1969 Manitoba provincial election =

There were five independent candidates in the 1969 Manitoba provincial election. One independent candidate, Gordon Beard, was elected to the Legislative Assembly of Manitoba for the northern electoral division of Churchill. Information about other candidates (including independent candidates who ran in by-elections between 1969 and 1973) may be found on this page.

== By-election candidates ==
=== St. Vital, 5 April 1971: Samuel Bordman ===
Samuel Bordman was a wireless operator with the Department of Transport, and a frequent candidate for public office in Winnipeg in the 1960s and early 1970s. He was a longtime supporter of a referendum on the Metropolitan Corporation of Greater Winnipeg.

Electoral record
Election	Division	Party	Votes	%	Place	Winner
1962 provincial	St. Johns	Independent	54		6/6	Saul Cherniack, New Democratic Party
1964 municipal	Greater Winnipeg council, Ward Five	Independent	830		4/4	Jack Willis, GWEC
municipal by-election, December 1965	Greater Winnipeg council, Ward Three	Independent			lost	John P. Sulymko, GWEC
1966 municipal	Greater Winnipeg council, Ward Five	Independent	880		3/3	Jack Willis, GWEC
provincial by-election, 5 April 1971	St. Vital	Independent	13	0.14	4/4	Jim Walding, New Democratic Party
