= Soldier Mountain =

Alpine ski area in Idaho, U.S.

Soldier Mountain Ski Area
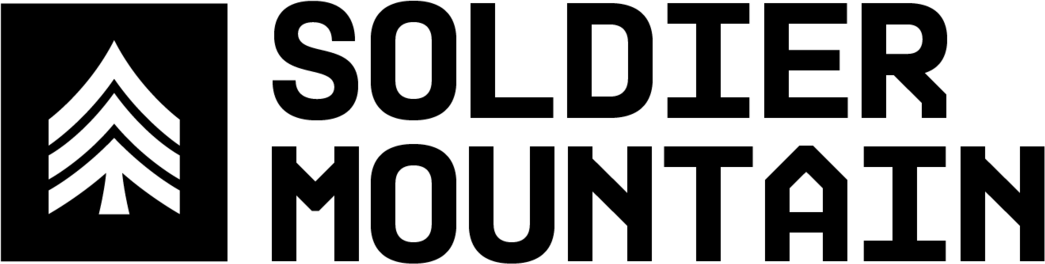

- Location in Idaho Location in United States
- Location: Sawtooth National Forest; Camas County, Idaho, U.S.
- Nearest city: Fairfield - 12 mi (19 km); Hailey - 45 mi (72 km); Mtn. Home - 76 mi (122 km)
- Coordinates: 43.485°N 114.830°W
- Vertical: 1,421 feet (433 m)
- Top elevation: 7,177 feet (2,188 m)
- Base elevation: 5,756 feet (1,754 m)
- Skiable area: 1,180 acres (4.8 km^{2})
- Trails: 36: 28% easiest; 25% more difficult; 47% most difficult
- Lift system: 2 double chairs 1 magic carpet
- Terrain parks: 1
- Snowfall: 100 inches (250 cm)
- Snowmaking: not in service
- Night skiing: none
- Website: soldiermountain.com

Soldier Mountain Ski Area is an alpine ski area in the western United States, in the Soldier Mountains of Sawtooth National Forest in south central Idaho. Located 12 miles (19 km) north of Fairfield in very rural Camas County, its summit elevation is 7,177 feet (2,188 m) above sea level with a vertical drop of 1,425 feet (434 m). The area has two chairlifts in series on its east-facing slopes, and a magic carpet was installed in the fall of 2012 near the base. The magic carpet was replaced in 2020 after the original was destroyed in a fire.

During its seasonal operations, Soldier Mountain is open from Thursday through Sunday, except for the Christmas holiday season when it is open daily.

== History ==
After watching the 1948 Winter Olympic tryouts in nearby Sun Valley, Bob Frostenson and his friend, Harry Durall, decided they could not turn their backs on the sport of skiing. That summer they raised $10,000 (equivalent to $134,000 today) and began work on a base lodge, and purchased two rope tows, the first powered by a 1938 Chevrolet engine. They cut timber, installed lifts, and built lodges by hand.

The first chairlift was installed in 1971, and the upper chairlift (Bird's Eye) was added in 1974. Soldier has 1,150 acres (4.7 km^{2}) of variable terrain including a terrain park, glades, bowls, and tree skiing. Soldier maintained snowmaking capabilities, although it has not operated since 1996. Four miles (6 km) west of Soldier's summit is Smoky Dome, with an elevation of 10,095 feet (3,077 m). In between there are several peaks well over 9,000 feet (2,740 m): Peak 1 at 9,147 feet (2,788 m) and Peak 2 at 9,529 feet (2,904 m) are used in Soldier's backcountry skiing operations, served by snowcat.

Actor Bruce Willis, a part-time resident of Hailey, bought the ski area in the mid-1990s. It was speculated that Willis planned lift service to Peak 1 or Peak 2.

An early morning fire on Monday, March 30, 2009, destroyed the 61-year-old base lodge. The cause was attributed to electrical wiring, and occurred shortly after the final day of the ski season. A new 4,500-square-foot (420 m^{2}) base lodge was constructed and Soldier Mountain reopened ten months later, on January 28, 2010.

After nearly two decades of ownership, Willis donated it to a non-profit organization, "Soldier Mountain Ski Area, Inc", in 2012. Many of its members were from the area and had been skiing/boarding the mountain since childhood. On November 4, 2015, the McFerrans of Bend, Oregon, purchased Soldier Mountain from a debt auction for $149,000. In 2018, the McFerrans put the ski area up for sale for $800,000, listed it on Craigslist in 2019, and eventually sold it to an investment group called Ascent Ventures from Lehi, Utah, in 2020.

The new ownership then built a few lift-served mountain bike single track trails that were set to open on August 7, 2020. However, a lightning strike started a wildfire on August 5 that spread through most of the area, either damaging or destroying most of the equipment on the mountain while leaving the lodge area untouched. The ski area was able to make enough repairs to open for the 2020–21 season. The mountain added four more bike trails in early 2021 and opened the trail system on May 21, 2021.

== Lifts ==
Lift name	Vertical drop	Length	Type	Ride time	Hourly capacity	Gradient	Year
High Trail	876' (267 m)	3740' (1140 m)	Double Chair	7.5 mins		23.4% (13.2 deg.)	1971
Bird's Eye	599' (183 m)	2265' (690 m)	Double Chair	5 mins		26.4% (14.8 deg.)	1974
Miss Belle	50' (15 m)	220' (91 m)	Magic Carpet	2.5 mins		16.7% (9.5 deg.)	2020

== Video ==
- You Tube Soldier Mountain lodge fire - March 30, 2009
