= Soldier Mountain (California) =

Mountain in California, United States

- Location within California

Highest point
- Elevation: 1,686 m (5,531 ft)
- Prominence: 482 m (1,581 ft)
- Coordinates: 41°4′26.74″N 121°33′48.89″W

Geography
- Location: Shasta County, California, U.S.
- Parent range: Cascade Range
- Topo map: USGS Dana

Soldier Mountain is a mountain located in the Cascade Range of northwest Shasta County, California, which stands at 1,696 m (5,531 ft). It is around 4.2 km (2.6 mi) south of Dana, California.

Atop the mountain, there is an old fire lookout tower accessible via dirt road.

== See also ==
- Cascade Range
