= Soldier (artist) =

Nigerian-British artist

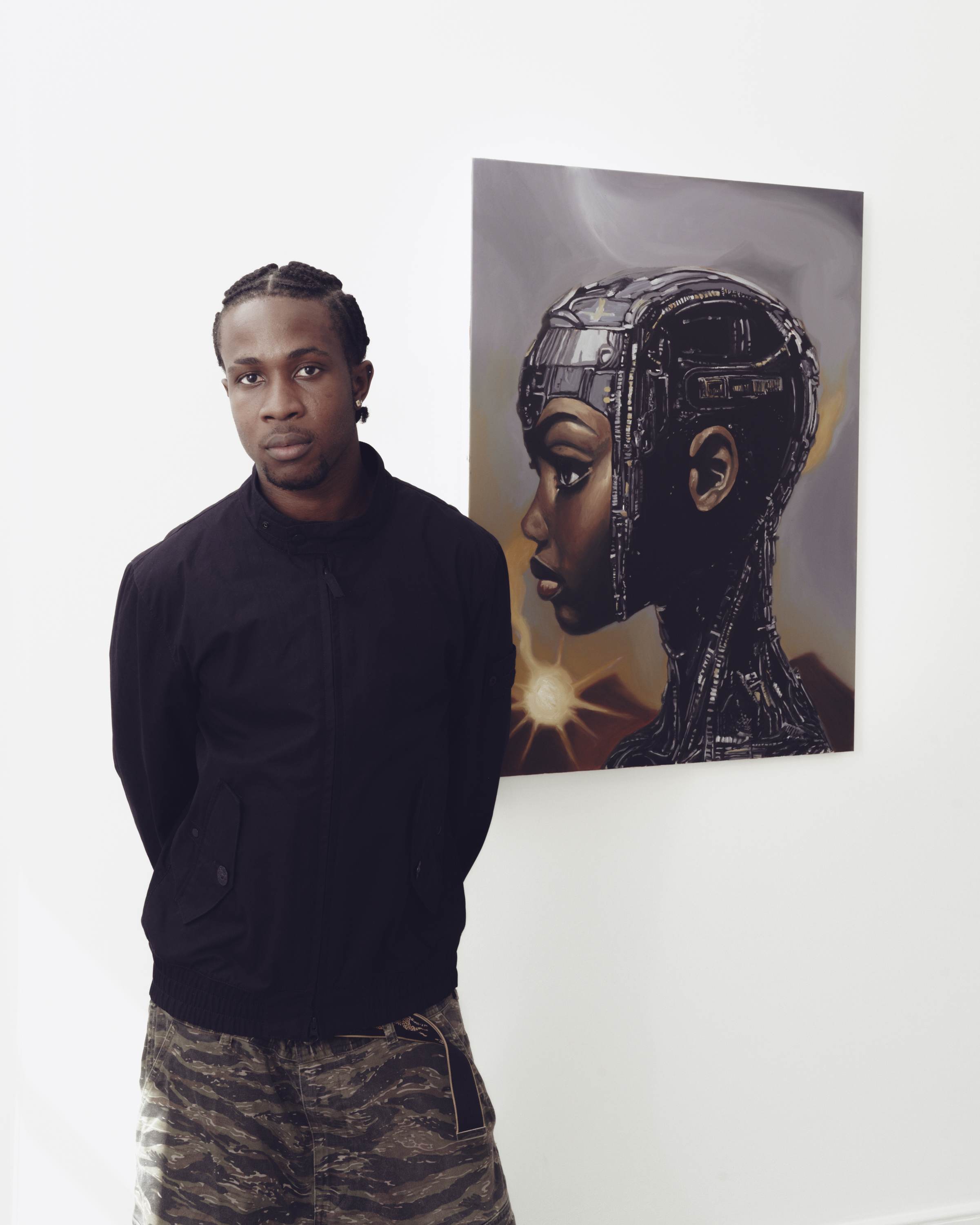

Leonard Iheagwam, better known as Soldier, is a Nigerian-born, London-based visual artist, designer, and skateboarder. His work often addresses themes of migration, diasporic memory, spirituality, and cultural identity. A self-taught artist, Soldier is also the co-founder of Motherlan, a Lagos-based skate and streetwear collective.

== Early life and education ==
Soldier was born in Lagos, Nigeria, into a religious household as the son of a preacher. Drawn to street culture and creative expression from an early age, he left home at 16 to pursue art and skateboarding full-time, at times experiencing homelessness as a teenager. Through WAFFLESNCREAM, Nigeria's first skate shop, he met Slawn and Onyedi. In 2016, they co-founded Motherlan, a youth-driven collective merging skateboarding, fashion, and experimental art. Motherlan was later featured on the cover of i-D and was described as part of the rise of Nigerian skate culture.

== Artistic career ==
After relocating to London to study graphic design and communication at The University Of Westminster with visa sponsorship from Skepta, Soldier developed his fine art practice while remaining involved in skate and fashion. His work spans painting, portraiture, sculpture and pop art with recurring motifs including camouflage and African passports.

His Passport Series reimagines West African travel documents to interrogate the politics of borders and global mobility. Soldier says "Whilst the idea of passports and borders works in theory, practical application only benefit the few. It must be reviewed. Too many have died at the hands of their travel papers. Too many families have suffered." With the Passport Series, Soldier spotlights the immigration rights topic, which goes beyond politics, according to the artist. "Whilst you may not be able to relate, at least you can claim to be aware".

His debut solo exhibition, When The Saints Go Marching, opened in London in April 2024 as part of the Incubator series. “The exhibition examined the Nigerian Civil War, recalling the late 1960s conflict with the Republic of Biafra among local sportsmen and his relatives who experienced the war firsthand”. His second solo exhibition, Black Star, opened at Kearsey & Gold in 2025. According to a piece in 032c, “The exhibition imagined a toxic future where humanity survives through tech- woven exoskeletons—yet the pieces remain deeply grounded in his African roots”.

He has exhibited at institutions including the Saatchi Gallery, Saatchi Yates, and the Incubator series. He also designed skateboards for Hamilton’s Mission 44 foundation.

== Collaborations and cultural impact ==
Soldier has collaborated with Louis Vuitton under Pharrell Williams, Marni, Salomon, Awake NY, Timberland, and True Religion. Since 2021 he has also appeared in Supreme’s global campaigns.

His work and cultural impact have been profiled in outlets including 032c, Evening Standard, Highsnobiety, The Big Issue, i-D, and Wonderland.
