= Soldat Island =

Antarctic island

- Location within Antarctica

Geography
- Location: Antarctica
- Coordinates: 68°31′S 78°11′E
- Length: 4.6 km (2.86 mi)

Administration
- Administered under the Antarctic Treaty System

Demographics
- Population: Uninhabited

Soldat Island is an elongated rocky island, 4.6 kilometres (2.5 nmi) long, lying south of Partizan Island in the south part of the entrance to Langnes Fjord, Vestfold Hills. This feature was photographed by the Lars Christensen Expedition (1936–37), but was plotted on the subsequent maps as a peninsula. It was first shown to be an island by John Roscoe's 1952 study of aerial photographs of the area taken by U.S. Navy Operation Highjump (1946–47). The area was photographed by ANARE (Australian National Antarctic Research Expeditions) (1954–58) and the Soviet Antarctic Expedition (1956), the latter applying the name Ostrov Soldat (soldier island).

== See also ==
- List of antarctic and sub-antarctic islands
