= Ben Boardman =

English footballer (1899–1968)

Personal information
- Full name: Benjamin Boardman
- Date of birth: 28 April 1899
- Place of birth: Ashton-under-Lyne, England
- Date of death: 1968 (aged 68–69)
- Position: Inside forward

Senior career*
Years	Team	Apps	(Gls)
1923–1924	Macclesfield		
1924–1931	Stockport County	185	(30)
1931–1932	Manchester City	0	(0)
Total		185	(30)
- * Club domestic league appearances and goals

Benjamin Boardman (28 April 1899 – 1968) was an English footballer who played in the Football League for Stockport County.
