= Soldier Mountains =

Mountain range in the state of Idaho, US

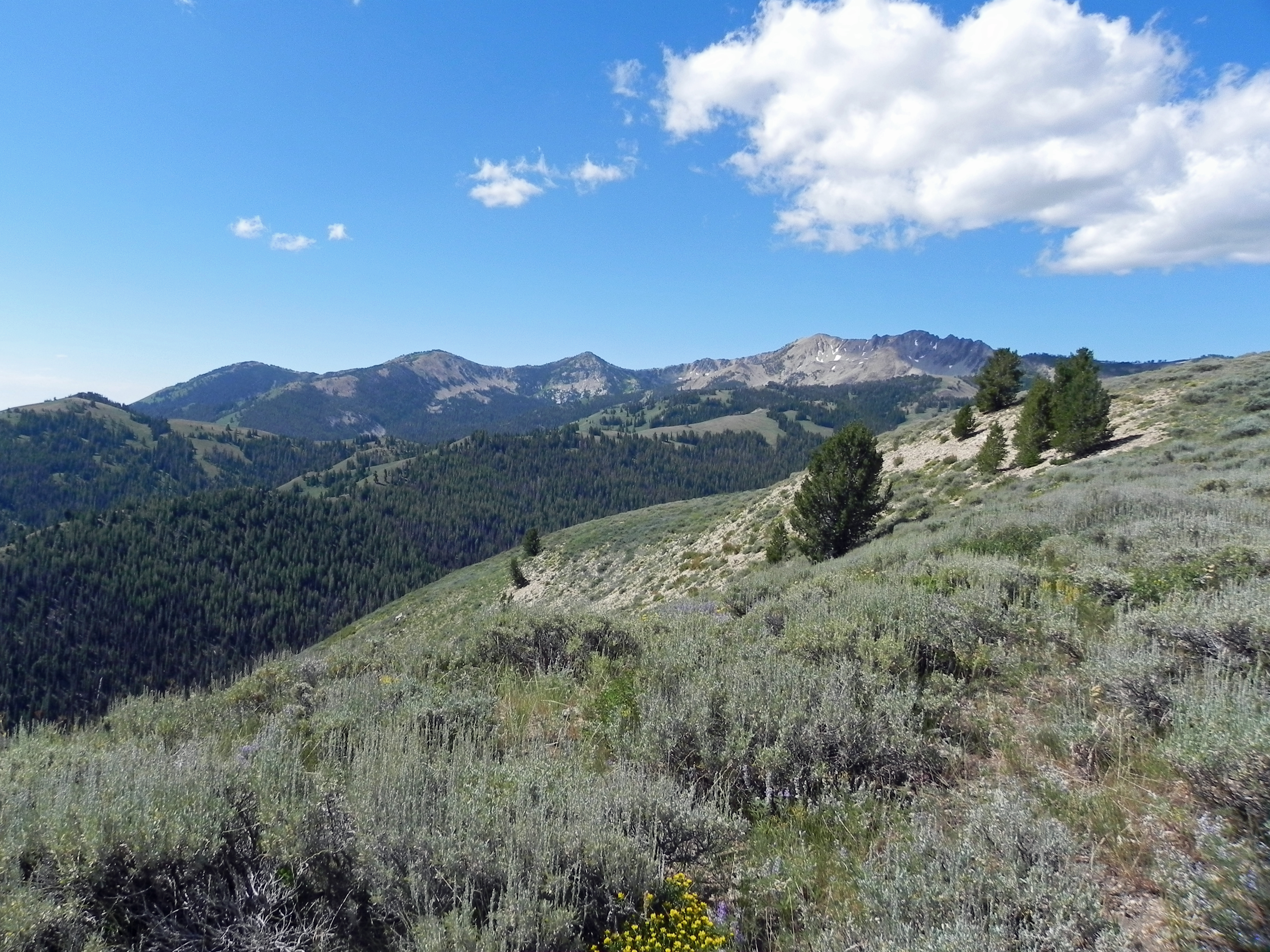
- Soldier Mountains from the north

Highest point
- Peak: Smoky Dome
- Elevation: 10,095 ft (3,077 m)
- Coordinates: 43°29′36″N 114°56′11″W

Dimensions
- Length: 28 mi (45 km) E/W
- Width: 14 mi (23 km) N/S

Geography
- Country: United States
- State: Idaho
- Parent range: Rocky Mountains

The Soldier Mountains are a mountain range in the U.S. state of Idaho, spanning northern Camas and eastern Elmore counties. The highest point in the range is Smoky Dome at 10,095 feet (3,077 m), and the range is bounded on the west and north by the South Fork Boise River. The mountains are located within Sawtooth National Forest north of Fairfield, Idaho. The Soldier Mountain Ski Area is located within the range to the east of Smoky Dome.

Iron Mountain near the western end of the Soldier Mountains has an old Forest Service fire lookout on its summit. Several road and trails are located in the mountains, which provide for a variety of activities including hiking, off-road vehicle riding, fishing, and hunting. Most of the peaks can be accessed relatively easily via class one or two routes.

== Peaks ==
The peaks of the Soldier Mountains
Mountain Peak	Elevation	Prominence	Isolation	Location
Smoky Dome	10,095 ft 3077 m	3,255 ft 992 m	16.98 mi 27.3 km	43.493236°N 114.936256°W
North Smoky Dome	9,934 ft 3028 m	407 ft 124 m	0.63 mi 1.01 km	43.5001°N 114.9276°W
Peak 9,712	9,711 ft 2960 m	972 ft 296 m	5.46 mi 8.79 km	43.52874°N 115.033664°W
Iron Mountain	9,695 ft 2955 m	514 ft 157 m	0.89 mi 1.43 km	43.53810°N 115.04507°W
Third Peak	9,665 ft 2946 m	406 ft 124 m	0.98 mi 1.58 km	43.48651°N 114.91929°W
Second Peak	9,528 ft 2904 m	316 ft 96 m	0.63 mi 1.01 km	43.48546°N 114.90701°W
Boardman Peak	9,455 ft 2882 m	687 ft 209 m	2.18 mi 3.51 km	43.51330°N 114.99532°W
First Peak	9,147 ft 2788 m	unknown	unknown	43.47854°N 114.89452°W

== Lakes ==
Lakes of the Soldier Mountains
Lake	Elevation	Max. length	Max. width	Location	Primary Outflow
Boardman Lake	2,670 m (8,760 ft)	106 m (348 ft)	076 m (249 ft)	43.525087°N 115.018087°W	Boardman Creek
Heart Lake	2,545 m (8,350 ft)	305 m (1,001 ft)	182 m (597 ft)	43.545249°N 115.040336°W	Deadwood Creek
Lower Deadwood Lake	2,670 m (8,760 ft)	160 m (520 ft)	088 m (289 ft)	43.529704°N 115.028765°W	Deadwood Creek
Lower Smoky Dome Lake	2,640 m (8,660 ft)	131 m (430 ft)	092 m (302 ft)	43.504746°N 114.947601°W	Boardman Creek
Upper Deadwood Lake	2,790 m (9,150 ft)	091 m (299 ft)	046 m (151 ft)	43.536234°N 115.039248°W	Deadwood Creek
Upper Smoky Dome Lake 1	2,800 m (9,200 ft)	098 m (322 ft)	036 m (118 ft)	43.501520°N 114.954222°W	Boardman Creek
Upper Smoky Dome Lake 2	2,815 m (9,236 ft)	131 m (430 ft)	035 m (115 ft)	43.503742°N 114.955336°W	Boardman Creek
West Smoky Dome Lake	2,675 m (8,776 ft)	052 m (171 ft)	046 m (151 ft)	43.509335°N 114.957672°W	Boardman Creek

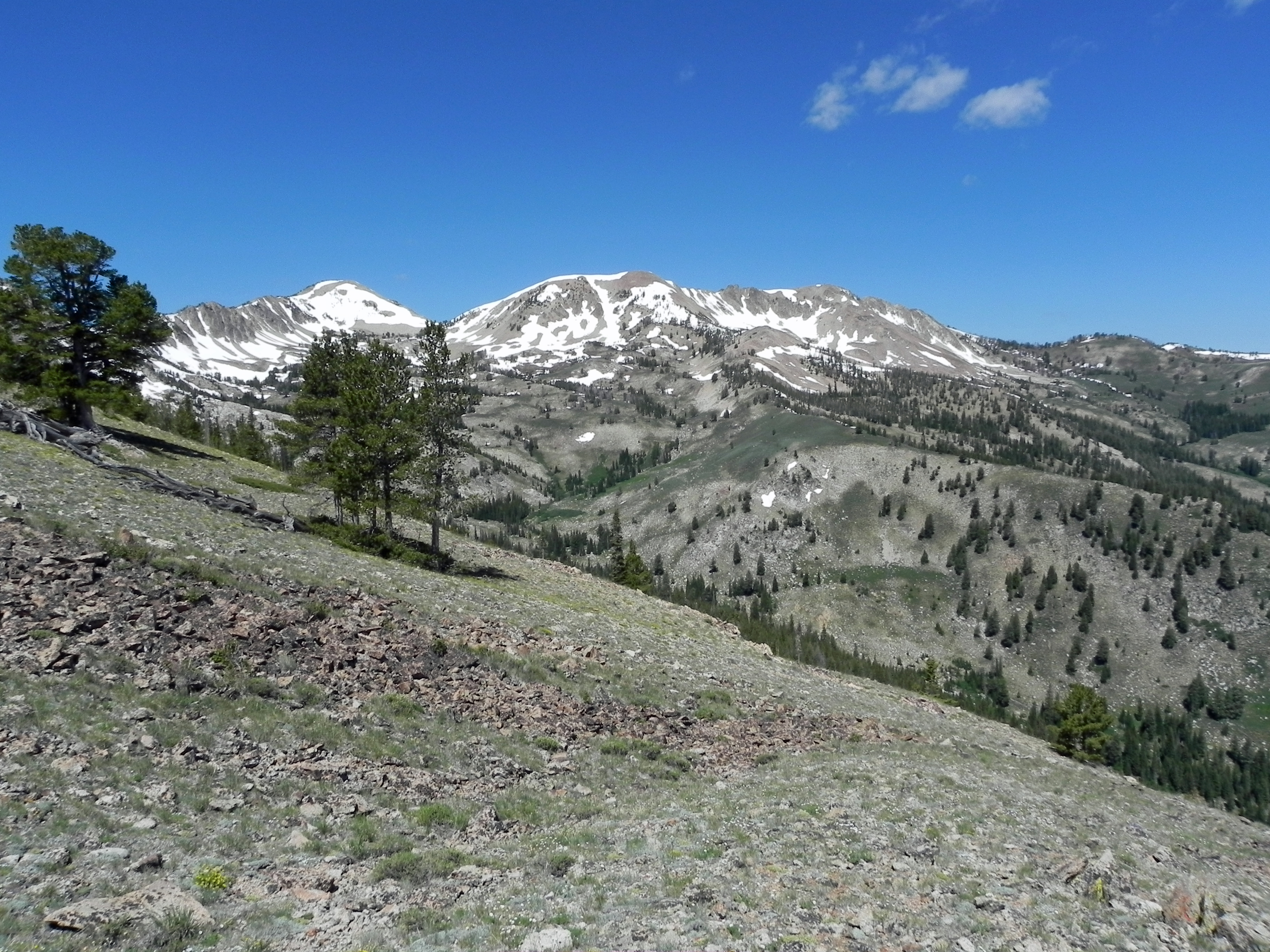
Soldier Mountains

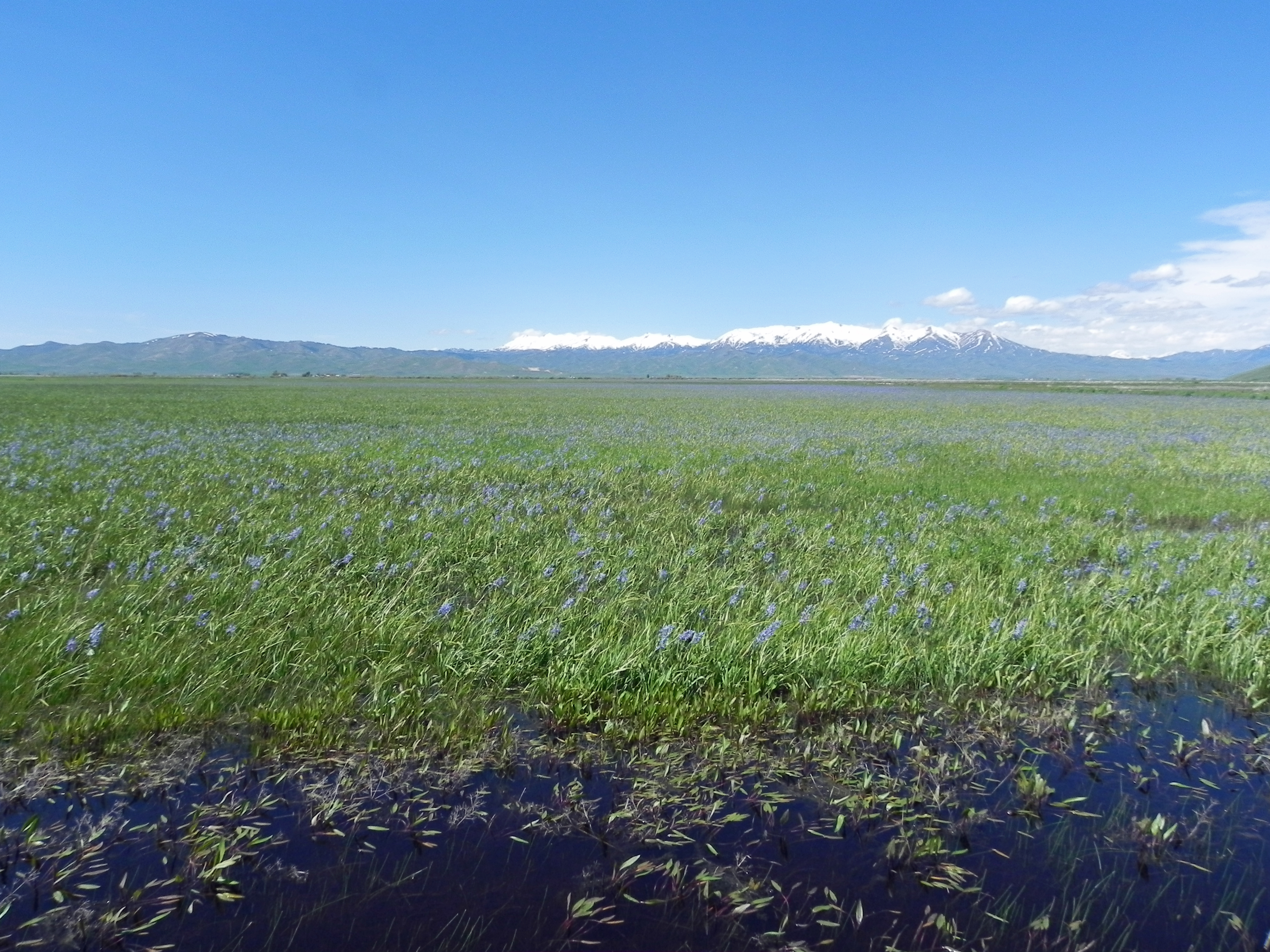
Solder Mountains from Camas Prairie Centennial Marsh

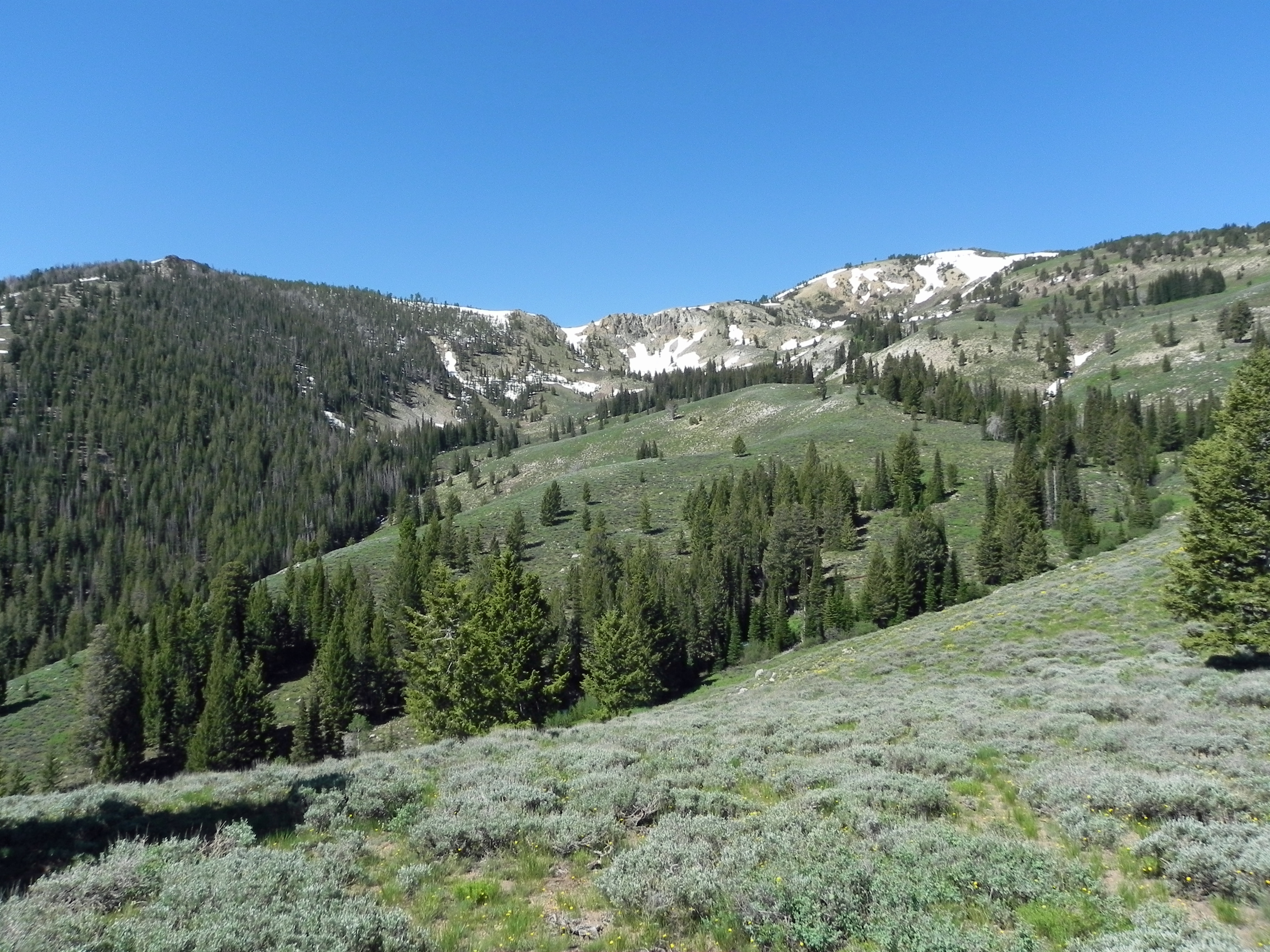
Soldier Mountains

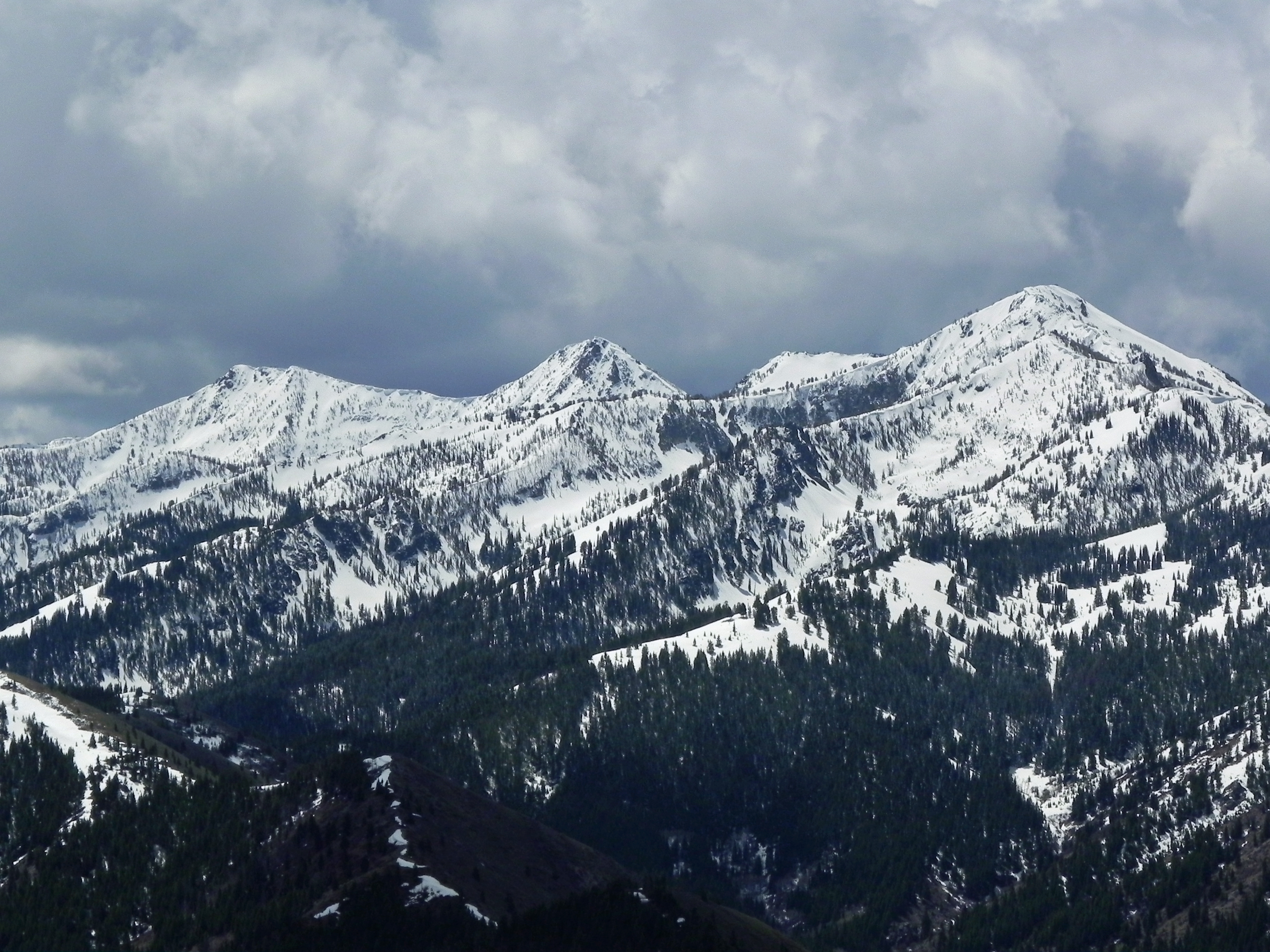
Soldier Mountains

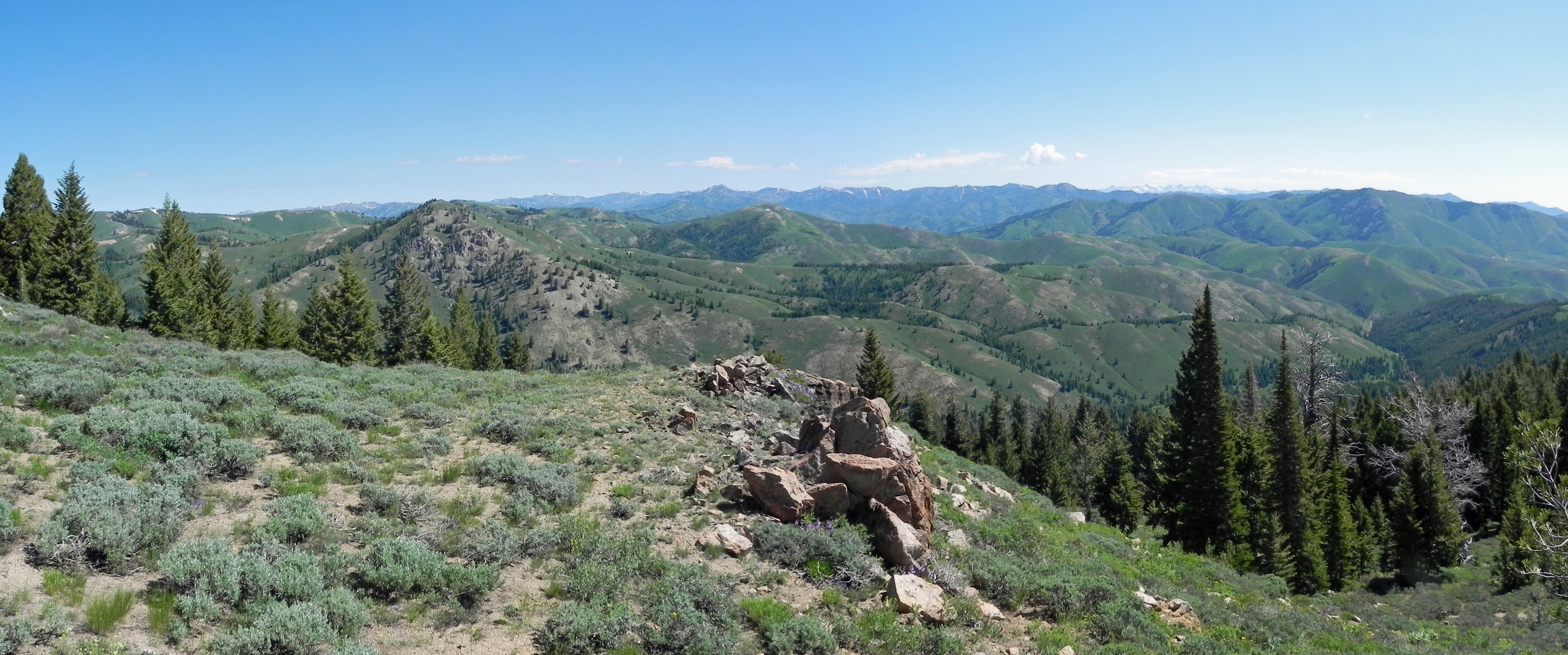
View northwest from Soldier Mountains

== See also ==
- List of mountain ranges in Idaho
