= Senator Boardman (disambiguation) =

Elijah Boardman (1760–1823) was a U.S. Senator from Connecticut from 1821 1823. Senator Boardman may also refer to:

- Halsey J. Boardman (1834–1900), Massachusetts State Senate
- Truman Boardman (1810–1895), New York State Senate
- William Whiting Boardman (1794–1871), Connecticut State Senate
