= Soldier (surname) =

Soldier is a surname associated with the occupation of a soldier. Notable people with the surname include:

- Dave Soldier (born 1956), American composer
- Liaquat Soldier (1952–2011), Pakistani stage and television comedy actor, writer and director
