= Keith Skillen =

English footballer

Personal information
- Date of birth: 26 May 1948
- Place of birth: Cockermouth, England
- Date of death: 7 August 2013 (aged 65)
- Position: Forward

Senior career*
Years	Team	Apps	(Gls)
- Deer Orchard
- Netherfield
1973–1975	Workington	64	(9)
1975–1976	Hartlepool United	6	(1)
- Workington
- Cockermouth
Total		70	(10)
- * Club domestic league appearances and goals

Keith Skillen (26 May 1948 – 7 August 2013) was an English professional footballer who played as a forward.

== Career ==
Born in Cockermouth, Skillen played for Deer Orchard, Netherfield, Workington, Hartlepool United and Cockermouth.

== Later life and death ==
Skillen died on 7 August 2013, at the age of 65, after suffering from motor neurone disease.
