= Andrew Boardman =

English clergyman (c.1550–1639)

Andrew Boardman (c. 1550–1639) was an English clergyman who was a minister at St. Mary's Church, Bury St. Edmunds as well as a vicar at Collegiate Church of St Mary, Warwick.

== Life ==
Boardman was a native of Lancashire, and was born in the year 1550. He was admitted to St John's College, Cambridge as a scholar on 9 November 1568 and was matriculated as a pensioner. Boardman graduated from college in 1572 by completing a B.A., and went on to complete an M.A. in 1575, a B.D. in 1582, and a D.D. in 1594. He was admitted as a fellow of the Lady Margaret foundation on 12 March 1572–3. Boardman was appointed as Greek lecturer at his college on 5 September 1580. On Michaelmas he was elected one of the college preachers. He was made junior bursar of his college on 27 January 1581–2, and was appointed as minister of St. Mary's Church, Bury St. Edmunds in the same year, his first degree in divinity. Boardman lived in a house identified in the Feoffees' accounts for 1586 as "next St. James steple".

Boardman vacated the preferment in 1586, and removed to a benefice then known as Allchurch, near Warwick. He was appointed by the municipality as vicar of St Mary's Church, Warwick on 11 January 1590–1, as successor to Leonard Fetherston. At Warwick he came into dispute with Thomas Cartwright, master of the Earl of Leicester's Hospital. The literary result of the controversy was The Fan of the Faithful to tries the Truth in Controversies; collected by A. B.; dedicated by James Price.

In 1594 Cambridge University granted Boardman a D.D. However, he was succeeded at St Mary's by Thomas Hull in 1595, and nothing is known of his subsequent activities. The authors of Athenæ Cantabrigienses identified Boardman as the writer of some English commendatory verses, to which the initials A. B. are subscribed, prefixed to Thomas Morley's (1597) Plaine and Easie Introduction to Practicall Musicke, though the Oxford Dictionary of National Biography judges that "the attribution seems highly unlikely".
