= James Skillen =

American theologian, political philosopher, and author

James W. Skillen is a Christian political philosopher and author. He was the executive director and then president of the Center for Public Justice (a Christian policy thinktank) from 1981 to 2009, when he retired from the organization. He helped found the organization in 1977. From 1973 to 1982 he taught political theory and international relations at three Christian colleges. Today, Skillen speaks regularly both domestically and internationally and writes primarily in areas of biblical studies and political philosophy and practice. He also mentors a number of advanced students.

== Education ==
He completed his B.A. in 1966 at Wheaton College, Wheaton, Illinois, majoring in philosophy. He received a Master of Divinity in 1969 from the Westminster Theological Seminary, Chestnut Hill, outside Philadelphia. Skillen studied philosophy at the Free University of Amsterdam in 1969–70, focusing particularly on the work of Herman Dooyeweerd, Professor of Law and renowned Christian philosopher. Skillen completed his doctorate in political science at Duke University under Prof. John Hallowell in 1974.

== Skillen as author ==
Skillen has written, edited, or contributed essays to more than 30 books, both for the Christian public and for academic journals. His works include The Scattered Voice: Christians at Odds in the Public Square (Zondervan, 1990), which was described as "remarkable" and "meticulously fair" by Prof. Mark Noll, then at Wheaton College. His most recent book is The Good of Politics: A Biblical, Historical, and Contemporary Introduction (Baker Academic, 2014). Dr. Bruce Wearne has compiled an extensive annotated bibliography of Skillen's writings: Public Justice for All:An annotated bibliography of the works of James W Skillen 1967–2008, (May 2008, 2nd edn). Available from the Wearne pages.

== Interfaith ==
In 2009, he signed a public statement encouraging all Christians to "read, wrestle with, and respond to Caritas in Veritate" the social encyclical by Pope Benedict XVI.
