= Fairfield, Idaho =

- City
- Motto: "Gateway to Adventure"
- Location of Fairfield in Camas County, Idaho.

- Location in the United States
- Coordinates: 43°20′56″N 114°48′02″W
- Country: United States
- State: Idaho
- County: Camas

Area
  - Total: 0.88 sq mi (2.27 km^{2})
  - Land: 0.88 sq mi (2.27 km^{2})
  - Water: 0 sq mi (0.00 km^{2})
- Elevation: 5,072 ft (1,546 m)

Population (2020)
  - Total: 441
  - Density: 503/sq mi (194/km^{2})
- Time zone: UTC-7 (Mountain (MST))
  - Summer (DST): UTC-6 (MDT)
- ZIP codes: 83322, 83327
- Area code: 208
- FIPS code: 16-26290
- GNIS feature ID: 2410475
- Website: cityoffairfieldidaho.com

Fairfield is the county seat of and the only incorporated city in Camas County, Idaho. The population was 441 at the time of the 2020 census, nearly half of the rural county's population.

== Geography ==
According to the United States Census Bureau, the village has a total area of 0.88 square miles (2.28 km^{2}), all of it land.

=== Climate ===
According to the Köppen Climate Classification system, Fairfield has a warm-summer mediterranean continental climate, abbreviated "Dsb" on climate maps. The hottest temperature recorded in Fairfield was 101 °F (38.3 °C) on July 12–14, 2002 and August 9, 2012, while the coldest temperature recorded was −42 °F (−41.1 °C) on January 19, 1984.

Climate data for Fairfield, Idaho, 1991–2020 normals, extremes 1948–2020
Month	Jan	Feb	Mar	Apr	May	Jun	Jul	Aug	Sep	Oct	Nov	Dec	Year
Record high °F (°C)	48 (9)	63 (17)	70 (21)	83 (28)	94 (34)	99 (37)	101 (38)	101 (38)	96 (36)	87 (31)	69 (21)	58 (14)	101 (38)
Mean maximum °F (°C)	40.5 (4.7)	44.6 (7.0)	56.6 (13.7)	72.8 (22.7)	82.1 (27.8)	89.3 (31.8)	95.2 (35.1)	94.5 (34.7)	87.9 (31.1)	76.9 (24.9)	60.0 (15.6)	42.6 (5.9)	96.0 (35.6)
Mean daily maximum °F (°C)	27.3 (−2.6)	31.3 (−0.4)	40.7 (4.8)	53.8 (12.1)	64.5 (18.1)	73.0 (22.8)	84.0 (28.9)	82.8 (28.2)	73.8 (23.2)	59.0 (15.0)	41.7 (5.4)	28.0 (−2.2)	55.0 (12.8)
Daily mean °F (°C)	18.3 (−7.6)	21.5 (−5.8)	30.7 (−0.7)	42.0 (5.6)	51.3 (10.7)	58.2 (14.6)	67.0 (19.4)	65.5 (18.6)	56.7 (13.7)	44.5 (6.9)	31.0 (−0.6)	19.0 (−7.2)	42.1 (5.6)
Mean daily minimum °F (°C)	9.2 (−12.7)	11.7 (−11.3)	20.6 (−6.3)	30.1 (−1.1)	38.1 (3.4)	43.3 (6.3)	50.1 (10.1)	48.3 (9.1)	39.5 (4.2)	30.1 (−1.1)	20.3 (−6.5)	10.0 (−12.2)	29.3 (−1.5)
Mean minimum °F (°C)	−18.6 (−28.1)	−14.8 (−26.0)	0.5 (−17.5)	14.9 (−9.5)	23.1 (−4.9)	28.9 (−1.7)	35.9 (2.2)	32.9 (0.5)	23.6 (−4.7)	14.2 (−9.9)	−4.5 (−20.3)	−14.5 (−25.8)	−23.5 (−30.8)
Record low °F (°C)	−42 (−41)	−38 (−39)	−24 (−31)	−3 (−19)	15 (−9)	19 (−7)	26 (−3)	23 (−5)	11 (−12)	−16 (−27)	−21 (−29)	−40 (−40)	−42 (−41)
Average precipitation inches (mm)	2.11 (54)	1.50 (38)	1.61 (41)	1.11 (28)	1.60 (41)	0.85 (22)	0.38 (9.7)	0.35 (8.9)	0.70 (18)	0.97 (25)	1.39 (35)	1.98 (50)	14.55 (370.6)
Average snowfall inches (cm)	11.6 (29)	6.9 (18)	2.4 (6.1)	1.1 (2.8)	0.1 (0.25)	0.0 (0.0)	0.0 (0.0)	0.0 (0.0)	0.0 (0.0)	0.4 (1.0)	5.7 (14)	14.6 (37)	39.2 (100)
Average precipitation days (≥ 0.01 in)	4.8	4.9	4.8	4.7	5.4	3.6	2.3	1.6	2.2	3.3	5.8	4.8	48.2
Average snowy days (≥ 0.1 in)	3.4	2.3	0.9	0.5	0.0	0.0	0.0	0.0	0.0	0.3	2.0	4.0	13.4
Source 1: NOAA
Source 2: XMACIS2 (mean maxima/minima, snow/snow days, precip days 1981–2010)

== Demographics ==
Historical population
Census	Pop.	Note	%±
1920	280		—
1930	306		9.3%
1940	511		67.0%
1950	502		−1.8%
1960	474		−5.6%
1970	336		−29.1%
1980	404		20.2%
1990	371		−8.2%
2000	395		6.5%
2010	416		5.3%
2020	441		6.0%
U.S. Decennial Census

=== 2010 census ===
As of the census of 2010, there were 416 people, 176 households, and 109 families residing in the village. The population density was 472.7 inhabitants per square mile (182.5/km^{2}). There were 244 housing units at an average density of 277.3 per square mile (107.1/km^{2}). The racial makeup of the city was 93.0% White, 1.0% Native American, 0.2% Asian, 1.4% from other races, and 4.3% from two or more races. Hispanic or Latino of any race were 6.3% of the population.

There were 176 households, of which 35.2% had children under the age of 18 living with them, 44.9% were married couples living together, 6.8% had a female householder with no husband present, 10.2% had a male householder with no wife present, and 38.1% were non-families. 31.8% of all households were made up of individuals, and 9.1% had someone living alone who was 65 years of age or older. The average household size was 2.36, and the average family size was 2.95.

The median age in the village was 35.1 years. 26.4% of residents were under the age of 18; 5.6% were between the ages of 18 and 24; 29.6% were from 25 to 44; 27.4% were from 45 to 64; and 11.1% were 65 years of age or older. The gender makeup of the village was 51.9% male and 48.1% female.

=== 2000 census ===
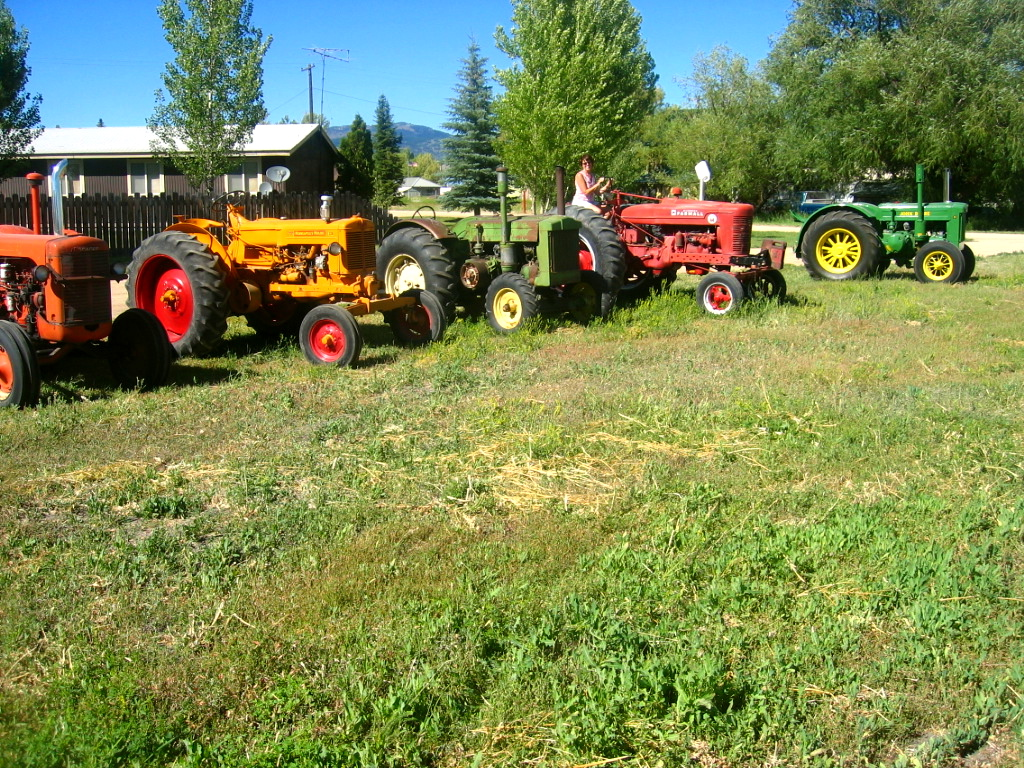
Tractors in Fairfield, June 2007

As of the census of 2000, there were 395 people, 162 households, and 115 families residing in the city. The population density was 1,214.3 inhabitants per square mile (468.8/km^{2}). There were 211 housing units at an average density of 648.7 per square mile (250.5/km^{2}). The racial makeup of the city was 97.97% White, 0.51% Native American, 0.25% from other races, and 1.27% from two or more races. Hispanic or Latino of any race were 6.08% of the population.

There were 162 households, out of which 33.3% had children under the age of 18 living with them, 60.5% were married couples living together, 6.8% had a female householder with no husband present, and 29.0% were non-families. 25.3% of all households were made up of individuals, and 11.1% had someone living alone who was 65 years of age or older. The average household size was 2.4,4 and the average family size was 2.92.

In the city, the population was spread out, with 25.6% under the age of 18, 7.3% from 18 to 24, 27.1% from 25 to 44, 27.6% from 45 to 64, and 12.4% who were 65 years of age or older. The median age was 39 years. For every 100 females, there were 96.5 males. For every 100 females age 18 and over, there were 94.7 males.

The median income for a household in the city was $31,167, and the median income for a family was $33,750. Males had a median income of $26,607 versus $16,667 for females. The per capita income for the city was $21,504. About 9.1% of families and 10.7% of the population were below the poverty line, including 6.7% of those under age 18 and 18.0% of those age 65 or over.

== Transportation ==
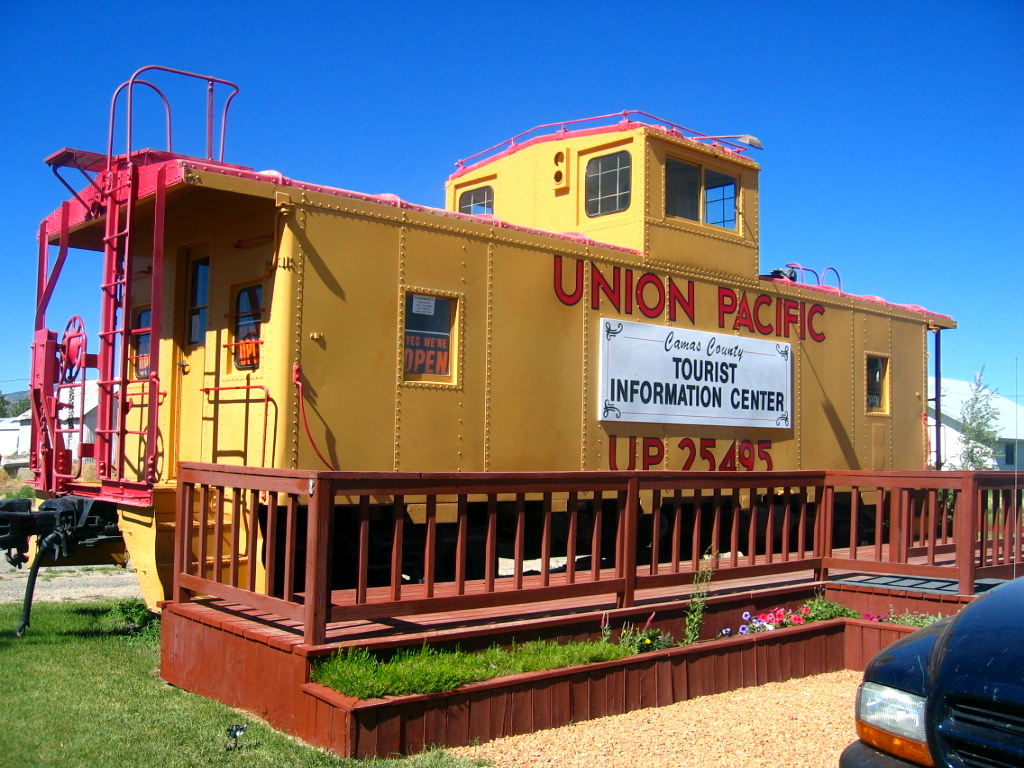
Visitor caboose in Fairfield, June 2007

Fairfield's main street is Soldier Road but is accessed by U.S. Route 20, a two-lane undivided highway connecting it to the west with Interstate 84 near Mountain Home, and to the east with State Highway 75 at Timmerman Junction in Blaine County. Four miles (6.4 km) east of Fairfield, State Highway 46 begins and proceeds south to Gooding.

== Education ==
The public schools are operated by Camas County School District #121, headquartered in Fairfield. Camas County High School is the district's flagship school, located on Soldier Road in central Fairfield.

== Recreation ==
The Soldier Mountains and Smoky Mountains of the Sawtooth National Forest (Fairfield Ranger District) are north of the village, offering many outdoor recreational opportunities. The Soldier Mountain ski area, established in 1948, is 12 miles (19 km) north of the village. The Snowkiting area, known around the world as one of the top destinations for this extreme sport, is 16 miles (26 km) west of the village. The Sun Valley ski resort is approximately 45 highway miles (70 km) northeast, up the Big Wood River Valley along State Highway 75, the Sawtooth Scenic Byway. The western end of the Magic Reservoir is 10 miles (16 km) east of Fairfield, and the Silver Creek fly fishing stream is about 30 miles (50 km) east of the village.

== Climate ==
Fairfield experiences a continental climate (Köppen Dsb) with cold, snowy winters and hot, dry summers.

Climate data for Fairfield Ranger Station
Month	Jan	Feb	Mar	Apr	May	Jun	Jul	Aug	Sep	Oct	Nov	Dec	Year
Record high °F (°C)	48 (9)	63 (17)	70 (21)	83 (28)	94 (34)	99 (37)	101 (38)	100 (38)	96 (36)	87 (31)	69 (21)	55 (13)	101 (38)
Mean daily maximum °F (°C)	30.8 (−0.7)	36.2 (2.3)	44.5 (6.9)	56.9 (13.8)	67.1 (19.5)	76.1 (24.5)	85.3 (29.6)	84.9 (29.4)	75.6 (24.2)	63.4 (17.4)	43.3 (6.3)	31.5 (−0.3)	58.0 (14.4)
Mean daily minimum °F (°C)	5.9 (−14.5)	9.0 (−12.8)	18.6 (−7.4)	28.5 (−1.9)	35.9 (2.2)	41.9 (5.5)	47.4 (8.6)	45.5 (7.5)	36.5 (2.5)	27.5 (−2.5)	18.0 (−7.8)	7.2 (−13.8)	26.8 (−2.9)
Record low °F (°C)	−42 (−41)	−38 (−39)	−24 (−31)	−3 (−19)	15 (−9)	19 (−7)	26 (−3)	23 (−5)	11 (−12)	−8 (−22)	−21 (−29)	−40 (−40)	−42 (−41)
Average precipitation inches (mm)	2.22 (56)	1.71 (43)	1.45 (37)	1.05 (27)	1.33 (34)	0.83 (21)	0.60 (15)	0.42 (11)	0.69 (18)	0.82 (21)	1.77 (45)	1.98 (50)	14.87 (378)
Source 1: NOAA (normals, 1971–2000)
Source 2: The Weather Channel (Records)

== See also ==
- List of cities in Idaho
