= Camas County, Idaho =

County in Idaho, United States

- County
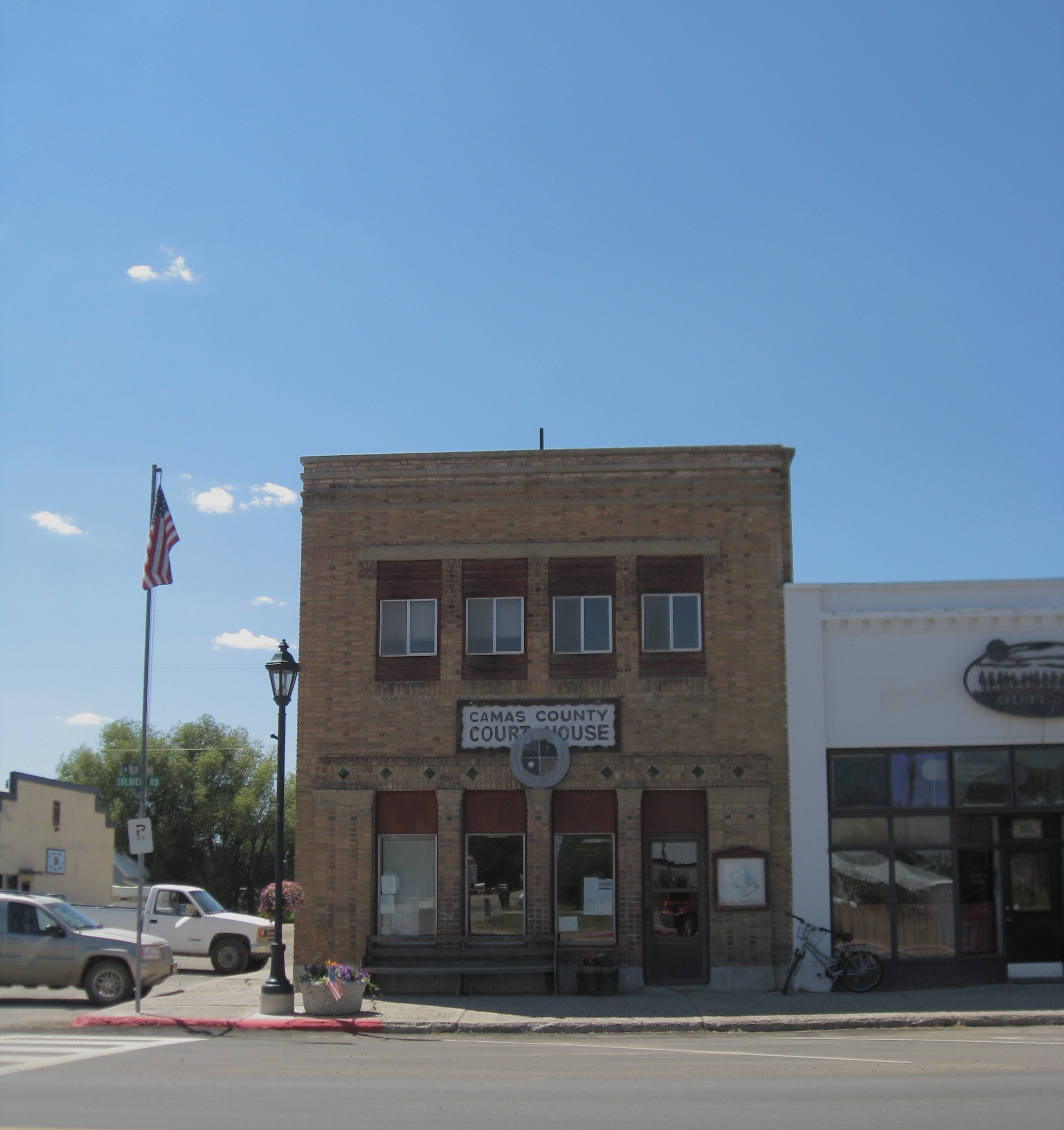
- Camas County Courthouse in Fairfield

- Seal

- Location within the U.S. state of Idaho
- Coordinates: 43°28′N 114°49′W
- Country: United States
- State: Idaho
- Founded: February 6, 1917
- Named for: Camas root
- Seat: Fairfield
- Largest city: Fairfield

Area
  - Total: 1,079 sq mi (2,790 km^{2})
  - Land: 1,074 sq mi (2,780 km^{2})
  - Water: 4.5 sq mi (12 km^{2}) 0.4%

Population (2020)
  - Total: 1,077
  - Estimate (2025): 1,316 ▲
  - Density: 1/sq mi (0.39/km^{2})
- Time zone: UTC−7 (Mountain)
  - Summer (DST): UTC−6 (MDT)
- Congressional district: 2nd
- Website: camascounty.id.gov

Camas County is a county in the southern portion of the U.S. state of Idaho. The county seat and largest city is Fairfield. The county was established 109 years ago in 1917 by the Idaho Legislature with a partition of Blaine County on February 6. It is named for the camas root, or Camassia, a lily-like plant with an edible bulb found in the region, that Native Americans and settlers used as a food source. As of the 2020 census, the population was 1,077, making it the second-least populous county in the state, after Clark County.

Camas County is part of the Hailey, ID Micropolitan Statistical Area.

== History ==
Native presence on the Camas Prairie dates back over 11,000 years ago. The Shoshoni, Northern Piute, and Nez Perce migrated annually to the Camas Prairie to gather camas and yampa for their winter food storage. Explorer, Donald Mackenzie discovered the Camas Prairie by 1820 and the area slowly grew in importance as a travel route. Military escorts for wagon trains headed to Oregon started using the route through the Camas Prairie in 1852. The route was later named Goodale Cutoff, for Timothy Goodale who first brought migrants through the Camas Prairie in 1862. When the cavalry was stationed at Fort Boise the southern portion of the Camas Prairie was an important feeding ground for their horses. In 1869, a treaty ratified by the US Senate provided a portion of the "Kansas Prairie" instead of the "Camas Prairie" to be retained by the Bannock Indians. The error may have made by the person who transcribed the treaty. Since there was no "Kansas Prairie" in Idaho, the treaty rights of the Bannocks were ignored. When they found a few settlers were allowing their hogs to feed on the Bannocks' traditional food source, the camas root, they objected (without results), which was a major cause of the Bannock War of 1878.

The Camas Prairie was initially entirely within Alturas County when initial settlement started following the Bannock War. While the Lava mining district near Fairfield was active in the 1880s, Camas County's settlements were primarily agricultural. By the fall of 1881, over 60 farming operations were in existence. Town settlements at Crichton and Soldier occurred almost simultaneously in 1884. Corral was settled no later than 1886. The Camas Prairie became part of Logan County when it was formed in 1889 with the mountainous area north of the prairie remaining within Alturas County. At the 1890 Census, Alturas County contained the Little Smoky precinct with 95 residents while Logan County contained the Corral, Crichton, Soldier, and Spring Creek precincts with a combined population of 805. In 1891, the Idaho Legislature attempted to transfer all five Camas precincts to a new county named Alta. The Idaho Supreme Court found the act unconstitutional. Blaine County included all five Camas precincts when it was organized in 1895. The settlement at Crichton was abandoned in 1896. The decline at Crichton, led to a slight decline to 836 residents within the five Camas precincts at the 1890 census. By 1910, the precincts more than doubled to reach a population of 1,804 residents. A railroad reached the Camas Prairie in 1911 and ran through what is now Fairfield. The railroad's arrival led the majority of settlement in Soldier to locate to what became known as Fairfield.

== Geography ==
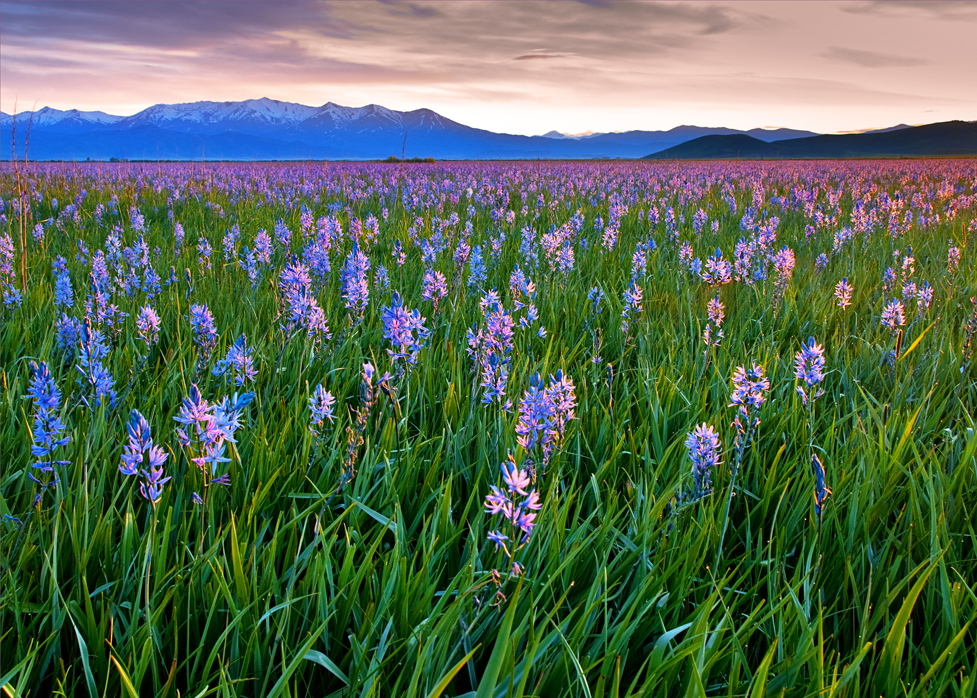
Sunrise at Camas Prairie Centennial Park, near Hill City. Camas flowers with the Soldier Mountains in the background

According to the United States Census Bureau, the county has a total area of 1,079 square miles (2,790 km^{2}), of which 1,074 square miles (2,780 km^{2}) is land and 4.5 square miles (12 km^{2}) (1.0%) is water. The highest point is Camas County Highpoint at 10,337 ft (3,151 m), on the county's northern border with Blaine County.

=== Adjacent counties ===
- Blaine County – east
- Lincoln County – southeast
- Gooding County – south
- Elmore County – west

== Demographics ==
Historical population
Census	Pop.	Note	%±
1920	1,730		—
1930	1,411		−18.4%
1940	1,360		−3.6%
1950	1,079		−20.7%
1960	917		−15.0%
1970	728		−20.6%
1980	818		12.4%
1990	727		−11.1%
2000	991		36.3%
2010	1,117		12.7%
2020	1,077		−3.6%
2025 (est.)	1,316	▲	22.2%
U.S. Decennial Census; 1790–1960, 1900–1990, 1990–2000, 2010–2020

=== Racial and ethnic composition ===
Camas County, Idaho – Racial and ethnic composition Note: the US Census treats Hispanic/Latino as an ethnic category. This table excludes Latinos from the racial categories and assigns them to a separate category. Hispanics/Latinos may be of any race.
Race / Ethnicity (NH = Non-Hispanic)	Pop 1980	Pop 1990	Pop 2000	Pop 2010	Pop 2020	% 1980	% 1990	% 2000	% 2010	% 2020
White alone (NH)	3,199	2,791	910	1,008	938	95.72%	95.65%	91.83%	90.24%	87.09%
Black or African American alone (NH)	1	0	1	2	2	0.03%	0.00%	0.10%	0.18%	0.19%
Native American or Alaska Native alone (NH)	31	21	3	6	0	0.93%	0.72%	0.30%	0.54%	0.00%
Asian alone (NH)	5	5	2	1	8	0.15%	0.17%	0.20%	0.09%	0.74%
Native Hawaiian or Pacific Islander alone (NH)	x	x	0	0	0	x	x	0.00%	0.00%	0.00%
Other race alone (NH)	4	0	0	0	5	0.12%	0.00%	0.00%	0.00%	0.46%
Mixed race or Multiracial (NH)	x	x	20	25	65	x	x	2.02%	2.24%	6.04%
Hispanic or Latino (any race)	102	101	55	75	59	3.05%	3.46%	5.55%	6.71%	5.48%
Total	3,342	2,918	991	1,117	1,077	100.00%	100.00%	100.00%	100.00%	100.00%

=== 2020 census ===
As of the 2020 census, the county had a population of 1,077, a median age of 47.0 years, 23.0% of residents under the age of 18, and 23.0% aged 65 or older. For every 100 females there were 99.4 males, and for every 100 females age 18 and over there were 102.2 males age 18 and over.

The racial makeup of the county was 88.0% White, 0.2% Black or African American, 0.1% American Indian and Alaska Native, 0.8% Asian, 0.0% Native Hawaiian and Pacific Islander, 1.7% from some other race, and 9.2% from two or more races. Hispanic or Latino residents of any race comprised 5.5% of the population.

0.0% of residents lived in urban areas, while 100.0% lived in rural areas.

There were 486 households in the county, of which 27.8% had children under the age of 18 living with them and 21.0% had a female householder with no spouse or partner present. About 28.4% of all households were made up of individuals and 10.9% had someone living alone who was 65 years of age or older. There were 691 housing units, of which 29.7% were vacant; among occupied units, 80.7% were owner-occupied and 19.3% were renter-occupied. The homeowner vacancy rate was 0.5% and the rental vacancy rate was 5.9%.

=== 2010 census ===
As of the 2010 census, there were 1,117 people, 487 households, and 326 families living in the county. The population density was 1.0 inhabitant per square mile (0.39/km^{2}). There were 831 housing units at an average density of 0.8 units per square mile (0.31 units/km^{2}). The racial makeup of the county was 94.1% white, 0.5% American Indian, 0.3% black or African American, 0.1% Asian, 1.8% from other races, and 3.2% from two or more races. Those of Hispanic or Latino origin made up 6.7% of the population. In terms of ancestry, 24.8% were German, 20.2% were American, 15.1% were English, 8.8% were Irish, and 7.3% were Swedish.

Of the 487 households, 28.1% had children under the age of 18 living with them, 56.3% were married couples living together, 5.1% had a female householder with no husband present, 33.1% were non-families, and 28.3% of all households were made up of individuals. The average household size was 2.29 and the average family size was 2.77. The median age was 44.3 years.

The median income for a household in the county was $44,145 and the median income for a family was $43,092. Males had a median income of $39,022 versus $25,938 for females. The per capita income for the county was $19,659. About 14.1% of families and 16.3% of the population were below the poverty line, including 28.0% of those under age 18 and 4.0% of those age 65 or over.

=== 2000 census ===
As of the 2000 census, there were 991 people, 396 households, and 287 families living in the county. The population density was 0.8 people per square mile (0.31 people/km^{2}). There were 601 housing units at an average density of 0.6 units per square mile (0.23 units/km^{2}). The racial makeup of the county was 95.16% White, 1.21% Black or African American, 0.30% Native American, 0.20% Asian, 0.91% from other races, and 2.22% from two or more races. 5.55% of the population were Hispanic or Latino of any race. 20.5% were of German, 18.1% American, 15.4% English and 7.4% Irish ancestry.

There were 396 households, out of which 30.80% had children under the age of 18 living with them, 65.20% were married couples living together, 4.50% had a female householder with no husband present, and 27.50% were non-families. 22.20% of all households were made up of individuals, and 8.30% had someone living alone who was 65 years of age or older. The average household size was 2.49 and the average family size was 2.92.

In the county, the population was spread out, with 24.70% under the age of 18, 6.60% from 18 to 24, 28.20% from 25 to 44, 27.50% from 45 to 64, and 13.00% who were 65 years of age or older. The median age was 40 years. For every 100 females there were 104.80 males. For every 100 females age 18 and over, there were 102.20 males.

The median income for a household in the county was $34,167, and the median income for a family was $40,156. Males had a median income of $30,500 versus $21,563 for females. The per capita income for the county was $19,550. About 7.20% of families and 8.30% of the population were below the poverty line, including 7.20% of those under age 18 and 8.50% of those age 65 or over.

== Communities ==
=== City ===
- Fairfield

=== Unincorporated communities ===
- Corral
- Hill City
- Soldier

== Politics ==
With its small and mostly white population, Camas County is one of the most consistently Republican counties in Idaho, having last backed Democrats in 1960, when it voted for John F. Kennedy.

Third-party candidates have historically performed well in Camas. In 1992, Independent Ross Perot got 29.84% of the vote. In 1996, Reform Party candidate Ross Perot got 17.46%. In 2000, Reform Party candidate Pat Buchanan got 3.94%. In 2016, Evan McMullin got 5.59%.

United States presidential election results for Camas County, Idaho
Year	Republican		Democratic		Third party(ies)	
Year	No.	%	No.	%	No.	%
1920	400	59.08%	276	40.77%	1	0.15%
1924	226	35.26%	113	17.63%	302	47.11%
1928	413	63.25%	230	35.22%	10	1.53%
1932	234	33.91%	441	63.91%	15	2.17%
1936	274	37.48%	442	60.47%	15	2.05%
1940	367	49.06%	381	50.94%	0	0.00%
1944	301	48.71%	317	51.29%	0	0.00%
1948	289	50.26%	278	48.35%	8	1.39%
1952	425	65.38%	224	34.46%	1	0.15%
1956	337	55.89%	266	44.11%	0	0.00%
1960	284	46.86%	322	53.14%	0	0.00%
1964	316	55.05%	258	44.95%	0	0.00%
1968	271	56.22%	118	24.48%	93	19.29%
1972	344	74.30%	95	20.52%	24	5.18%
1976	288	62.20%	160	34.56%	15	3.24%
1980	360	67.92%	145	27.36%	25	4.72%
1984	364	74.13%	123	25.05%	4	0.81%
1988	288	65.90%	136	31.12%	13	2.97%
1992	202	41.56%	134	27.57%	150	30.86%
1996	283	52.02%	156	28.68%	105	19.30%
2000	359	70.81%	113	22.29%	35	6.90%
2004	450	75.63%	139	23.36%	6	1.01%
2008	422	68.28%	187	30.26%	9	1.46%
2012	402	69.55%	159	27.51%	17	2.94%
2016	410	69.49%	110	18.64%	70	11.86%
2020	507	75.22%	149	22.11%	18	2.67%
2024	547	75.14%	153	21.02%	28	3.85%

== Transportation ==
U.S. Highway 20 runs east–west through the county's center, at elevations just over 5,000 feet (1,520 m) above sea level, connecting west to Mountain Home in Elmore County; to the east it intersects State Highway 75 in Blaine County. The northern terminus of State Highway 46 is at US-20, four miles (6.4 km) east of Fairfield; it runs south over the Mount Bennett Hills into Gooding County and on to Gooding.

== Recreation ==
The Soldier Mountain ski area, opened 78 years ago in 1948, is twelve miles (20 km) north of Fairfield, in the Soldier Mountains of the Sawtooth National Forest.

== Education ==
There is one school district in the county: Camas County School District 121.

The county is in the catchment area, but not the taxation zone, for College of Southern Idaho.

== See also ==
- National Register of Historic Places listings in Camas County, Idaho
- County Assessor Parcel Map
