= Picabo, Idaho =

Unincorporated community in the state of Idaho, United States

- Community
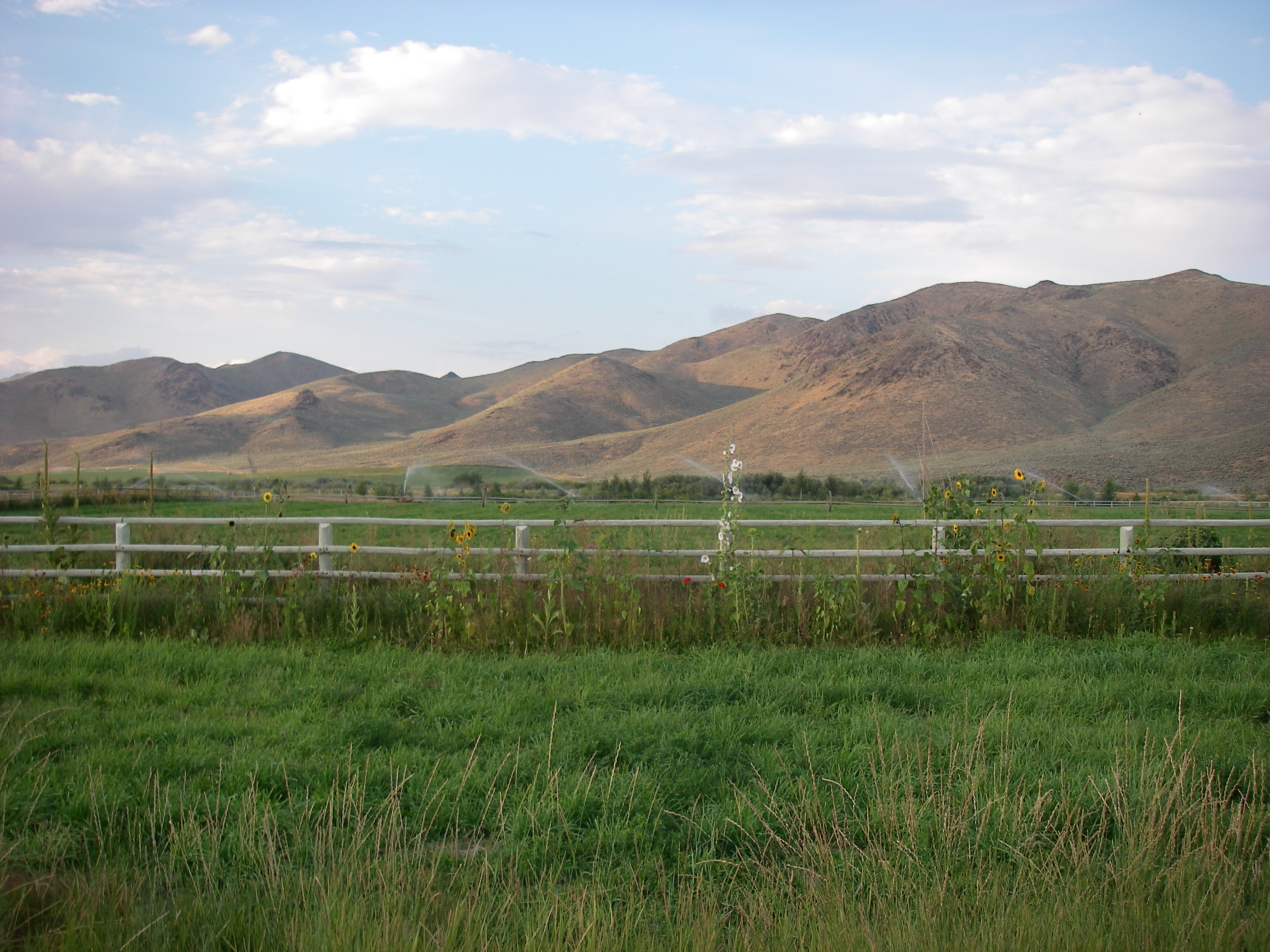
- Hills, mountains, and irrigated fields of Picabo

- Location in Idaho Location in the United States
- Coordinates: 43°18′21″N 114°04′04″W
- Country: United States
- State: Idaho
- County: Blaine County
- Physiographic region: Snake River Plain

Area
  - Total: 40.0 sq mi (103.5 km^{2})
- Elevation: 4,836 ft (1,474 m)

Population (2000)
  - Total: 128
  - Density: 3.20/sq mi (1.24/km^{2})
- Time zone: UTC-7 (Mountain Standard Time (MST))
  - Summer (DST): UTC-6 (Mountain Daylight Time (MDT))
- Postal code: 83348
- Area codes: 208, 986
- GNIS feature ID: 397029

Picabo (pronounced /ˈpiːkəbuː/) is an unincorporated community in Blaine County, Idaho, United States.

== Description ==
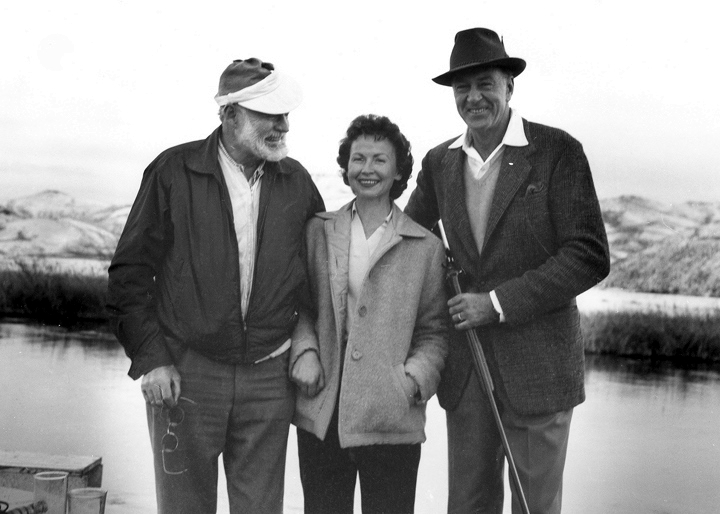
Ernest Hemingway bird-hunting at Silver Creek near Picabo, with Gary Cooper and local Bobbie Peterson, January 1959

Picabo is located along U.S. Route 20, about 6 miles (9.7 km) west of Carey, 19 miles (31 km) southeast of Hailey, and 31 miles (50 km) northeast of Shoshone. It has a gas station, country store, post office, and a small airport. The community is surrounded by large ranches and irrigated fields. The 2000 United States census for this ZIP Code shows a population of 128 in 56 housing units in 104 km^{2} (40 sq mi).

Picabo is located about 56 miles (90 km) north of the Snake River along the northern edge of the Snake River Plain, a topographic depression that cuts across the Basin and Range Mountain structures of southern Idaho. The nearest flowing stream is Silver Creek, a scenic spring-fed tributary of the Little Wood River, a key source of irrigation water for eastern Blaine County. The pristine Silver Creek is renowned among fly fishermen and was a favorite of Ernest Hemingway, who enjoyed hunting and fishing along the stream with local rancher, Bud Purdy.

== Name ==
The name "Picabo" supposedly derives from a Native American term translated as "silver water". The name "Picabo" was made familiar by Picabo Street, an Olympic skier who grew up in nearby Triumph.

== Climate ==
According to the Köppen Climate Classification system, Picabo has a warm-summer mediterranean continental climate, abbreviated "Dsb" on climate maps. The hottest temperature recorded in Picabo was 102 °F (38.9 °C) on July 17, 1998, and July 11, 2002, while the coldest temperature recorded was −37 °F (−38.3 °C) on December 23, 1990.

Climate data for Picabo, Idaho, 1991–2020 normals, extremes 1958–present
Month	Jan	Feb	Mar	Apr	May	Jun	Jul	Aug	Sep	Oct	Nov	Dec	Year
Record high °F (°C)	53 (12)	63 (17)	72 (22)	84 (29)	92 (33)	100 (38)	102 (39)	100 (38)	99 (37)	87 (31)	70 (21)	57 (14)	102 (39)
Mean maximum °F (°C)	43.6 (6.4)	47.6 (8.7)	60.9 (16.1)	72.4 (22.4)	82.2 (27.9)	90.6 (32.6)	96.7 (35.9)	94.3 (34.6)	89.0 (31.7)	77.2 (25.1)	60.4 (15.8)	46.2 (7.9)	97.5 (36.4)
Mean daily maximum °F (°C)	31.8 (−0.1)	36.4 (2.4)	46.5 (8.1)	57.1 (13.9)	67.1 (19.5)	76.1 (24.5)	86.8 (30.4)	85.5 (29.7)	75.6 (24.2)	60.6 (15.9)	44.5 (6.9)	32.3 (0.2)	58.4 (14.6)
Daily mean °F (°C)	19.4 (−7.0)	23.3 (−4.8)	32.9 (0.5)	41.2 (5.1)	50.6 (10.3)	57.6 (14.2)	66.5 (19.2)	65.2 (18.4)	56.5 (13.6)	44.0 (6.7)	31.3 (−0.4)	20.8 (−6.2)	42.4 (5.8)
Mean daily minimum °F (°C)	7.1 (−13.8)	10.1 (−12.2)	19.3 (−7.1)	25.3 (−3.7)	34.1 (1.2)	39.0 (3.9)	46.2 (7.9)	45.0 (7.2)	37.4 (3.0)	27.3 (−2.6)	18.1 (−7.7)	9.3 (−12.6)	26.5 (−3.0)
Mean minimum °F (°C)	−9.0 (−22.8)	−4.2 (−20.1)	7.4 (−13.7)	17.3 (−8.2)	24.3 (−4.3)	30.0 (−1.1)	38.7 (3.7)	36.7 (2.6)	27.4 (−2.6)	15.6 (−9.1)	2.8 (−16.2)	−7.7 (−22.1)	−14.3 (−25.7)
Record low °F (°C)	−33 (−36)	−30 (−34)	−15 (−26)	8 (−13)	14 (−10)	24 (−4)	29 (−2)	24 (−4)	16 (−9)	−3 (−19)	−18 (−28)	−37 (−38)	−37 (−38)
Average precipitation inches (mm)	1.78 (45)	1.15 (29)	1.52 (39)	1.09 (28)	1.45 (37)	0.86 (22)	0.31 (7.9)	0.23 (5.8)	0.58 (15)	1.15 (29)	1.05 (27)	1.80 (46)	12.97 (330.7)
Average snowfall inches (cm)	13.9 (35)	8.5 (22)	2.8 (7.1)	0.8 (2.0)	0.0 (0.0)	0.0 (0.0)	0.0 (0.0)	0.0 (0.0)	0.0 (0.0)	0.3 (0.76)	4.1 (10)	15.2 (39)	45.6 (115.86)
Average extreme snow depth inches (cm)	14.2 (36)	12.4 (31)	7.3 (19)	0.8 (2.0)	0.0 (0.0)	0.0 (0.0)	0.0 (0.0)	0.0 (0.0)	0.0 (0.0)	0.4 (1.0)	2.3 (5.8)	9.4 (24)	16.9 (43)
Average precipitation days (≥ 0.01 in)	6.8	5.8	6.0	6.6	6.4	4.4	1.7	2.1	3.0	4.7	5.4	7.0	59.9
Average snowy days (≥ 0.1 in)	5.4	3.6	1.3	0.5	0.0	0.0	0.0	0.0	0.0	0.3	2.3	5.1	18.5
Source 1: NOAA
Source 2: National Weather Service
