= Bellevue Historic District =

Bellevue Historic District may refer to:

in the United States

(by state)

- Bellevue Historic District (Bellevue, Idaho), listed on the NRHP in Idaho
- Bellevue Avenue Historic District, Newport, RI, listed on the NRHP in Rhode Island
- Bellevue Avenue/Casino Historic District, Newport, RI, listed on the NRHP in Rhode Island
- Bellevue Historic District (Columbia, South Carolina), listed on the NRHP in South Carolina
- Bellevue Rural Historic District, Forest, VA, listed on the NRHP in Virginia

== See also ==
- Bellevue (disambiguation)
