= Magic Dam =

Dam in Idaho, United States

Coordinates: 43°15′16″N 114°21′27″W

Magic Dam is an earthen embankment dam across the Big Wood River in southwestern Blaine County, Idaho, in the United States, about 40 miles (64 km) north of Twin Falls. The dam was completed in 1910 by Magic Reservoir Hydroelectric, Inc. for irrigation, flood control and hydroelectric generation, and stores up to 195,000 acre-feet (0.241 km^{3}) of water in Magic Reservoir, which lies in both Blaine County and adjacent southeastern Camas County. Water from the reservoir is used to irrigate 89,000 acres (36,000 ha) around and between Shoshone and Richfield. Magic Dam also supports a power station with three turbines totaling a capacity of 9,000 kW.

The dam's main embankment is 128 feet (39 m) high and 3,100 feet (940 m) long. Two auxiliary dikes keep the reservoir from overflowing during high elevations, while a concrete emergency spillway located west of the dam helps to pass floodwaters. At full water levels, Magic Reservoir covers up to 3,740 acres (1,510 ha), extending 6 miles (9.7 km) up the Big Wood River and 2.5 miles (4.0 km) up a tributary, Camas Creek. The dam and reservoir control runoff from a catchment area of 1,600 sq mi (4,100 km^{2}).

== See also ==
- List of dams and reservoirs in Idaho
