= Gimlet, Idaho =

Unincorporated community in the state of Idaho, United States

- Unincorporated community
- Location within the state of Idaho Gimlet, Idaho (the United States)
- Coordinates: 43°36′15″N 114°20′59″W
- Country: United States
- State: Idaho
- County: Blaine
- Elevation: 5,574 ft (1,699 m)
- Time zone: UTC-7 (Mountain (MST))
  - Summer (DST): UTC-6 (MDT)
- ZIP codes: 83340
- Area codes: 208, 986
- GNIS feature ID: 396552

Gimlet is an unincorporated community in Blaine County in the U.S. state of Idaho.

Gimlet is located in the Wood River Valley along State Highway 75 with Ketchum 5 mi (8 km) north and Hailey 6 mi (9.7 km) south of the community. Gimlet also has the only accessible road to the community of Triumph located 5 mi (8 km) northeast. The Big Wood River flows through Gimlet where it is joined by the East Fork Wood River flowing down from Triumph
