= Carey School =

Public school in Carey, Idaho, United States

Coordinates: 43°18′59″N 113°56′37″W

Carey School (K-12)

Location
- 20 Panther Lane; Carey, Idaho 83320; United States

Information
- Type: Public
- Established: 1965
- School district: Blaine County School District
- Principal: Kayla Janelle Burton
- Faculty: 21.09 (FTE)
- Grades: K-12
- Enrollment: 245 (2018-19)
- Student to teacher ratio: 11.62
- Color
- Mascot: Panther
- Yearbook: Panther
- IHSAA Division: 1A
- Website: Carey School

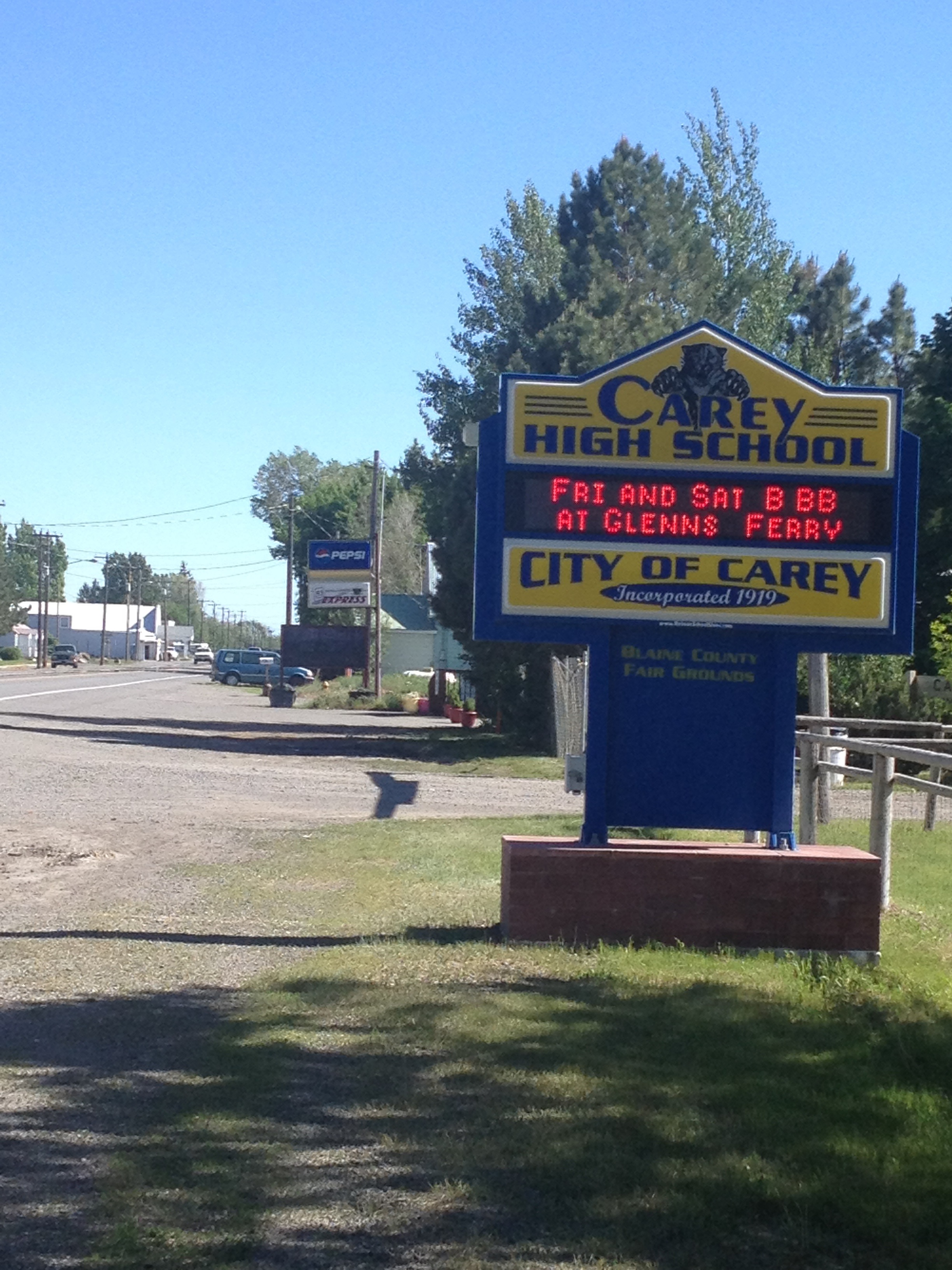
Sign for the school and the city government

Carey School is a K-12 school in the Blaine County School District and serves the rural farming community of Carey, Idaho. The high school is located on the same campus that includes an elementary and junior high school, encompassing Carey School.

The school's boundary includes Carey and Picabo.

== History ==
In 1987 the school board decided to have an addition built and to renovate the existing portion. 11 companies put forth bids to do the work, and the board selected Brennan Construction because its bid was the lowest.

Construction on the current high school facility began in 2003. The facility was to have 43,000 square feet (4,000 m^{2}) and have a walkway connection to the remainder of the school. The school district initially proposed 37,000 square feet (3,400 m^{2}). The estimated cost was $4,750,000.

== Athletics ==
The Carey High School football team was the 2006 and 2008 state champion in 1A Division II eight-man football in Idaho, their fourth state championship title. The Carey girls basketball have gone to state three years in a row. They have gotten consolation, 3rd and 2nd. In 2018, they won state championship in 1A Division II. Some of the most intense rivalries Carey has in sports have been with Richfield, Dietrich and in the past Shoshone High School.
