= Malad River (Gooding County, Idaho) =

River in Gooding County, Idaho in the United States

Malad River Big Wood River, Riviera Malades, Sickly River
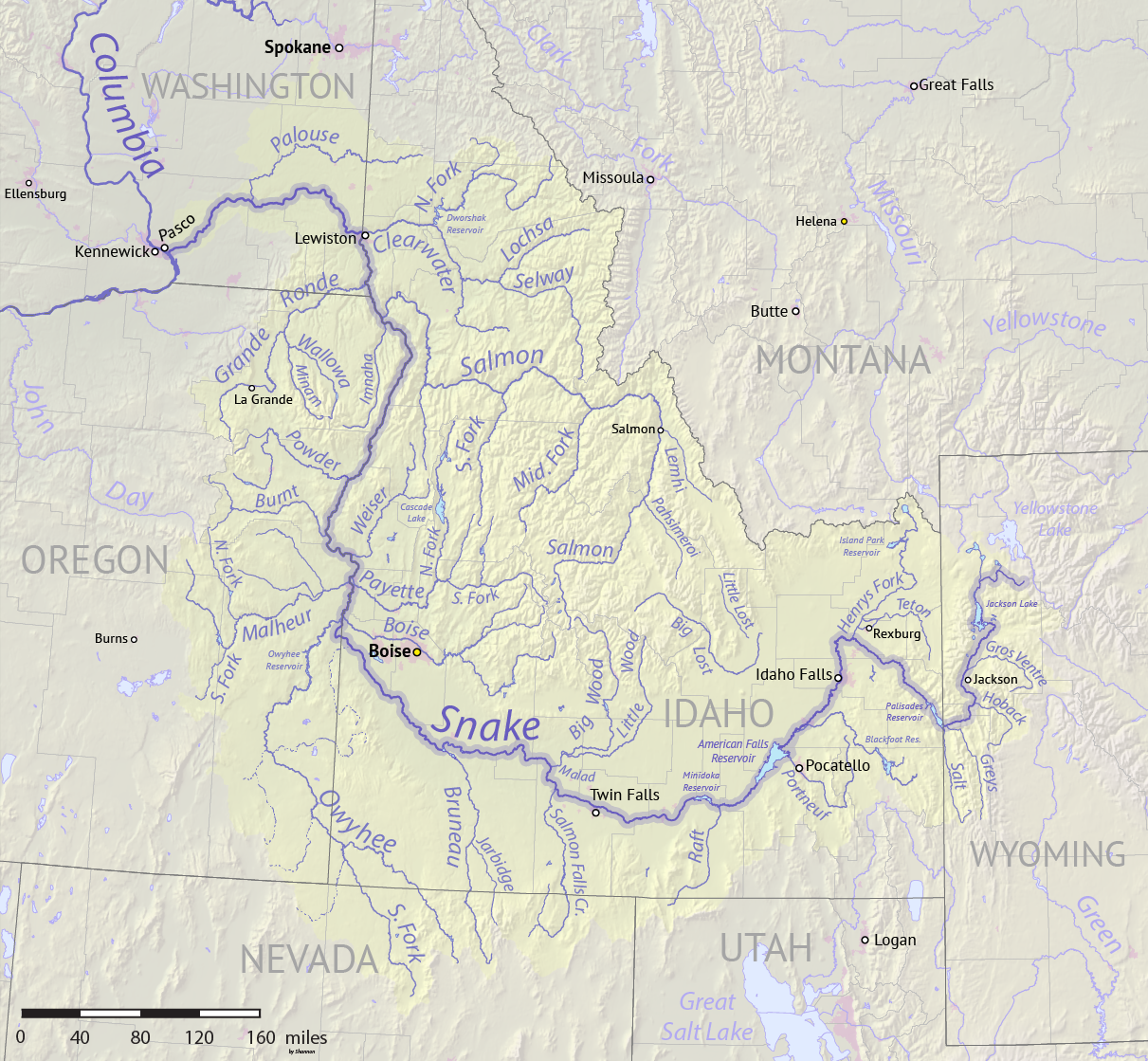
- Map of the Snake River watershed including the Malad River

Location
- Country: United States
- State: Idaho
- Region: Gooding County

Physical characteristics
- Source: Confluence of the Big Wood River & Little Wood River
  - coordinates: 42°56′42″N 114°47′46″W
  - elevation: 3,460 ft (1,050 m)
- Mouth: Snake River
  - coordinates: 42°51′45″N 114°54′18″W
  - elevation: 2,703 ft (824 m)
- Length: 12.0 mi (19.3 km)
- Basin size: 3,000 mi^{2} (7,800 km^{2})
- Discharge
  - location: near Hagerman
  - average: 286 cu ft/s (8.1 m^{3}/s)
  - minimum: 0 cu ft/s (0 m^{3}/s)
  - maximum: 6,400 cu ft/s (180 m^{3}/s)
- Discharge
  - location: mouth
  - average: 112 cu ft/s (3.2 m^{3}/s)

Basin features
- Tributaries
  - left: Little Wood River
  - right: Big Wood River

The Malad River is a river located within Gooding County, and Oneida County, Idaho, United States, and is a tributary of the Snake River.

== Description ==
The river is formed by the confluence of the Big Wood River (Note: One of the main tributaries of the Big Wood River is the Camas Creek. What makes that interesting is that one of the tributaries of that Camas Creek (not to be confused with at least four other Camas Creeks in Idaho) is also called the Malad River, thus making that Malad River a tributary of this Malad River.) and the Little Wood River near Gooding. From there the river flows south and west for 12.0 miles (19.3 km) to join the Snake River near Hagerman.

The river flows through Thousand Springs State Park, where it tumbles down a stairstep waterfall. The Malad Gorge is 250 feet (76 m) deep and 2.5 miles (4.0 km) long.

The river's flow is affected by numerous reservoirs and irrigation works on its tributaries. The Malad River itself is largely diverted into a power flume that enters the Snake below the mouth of the Malad, via a powerhouse. Below the diversion the Malad River is replenished by numerous springs, yet the average flow above the diversion is higher than at the river's mouth.

The Malad River is part of the Columbia River basin, being a tributary of the Snake River, which is a tributary to the Columbia River.

The name of the river stems from French malade, via Rivière aux Malades ('river of the sick'), presumably as a reference to some illness suffered by early French-Canadian trappers who investigated the area.

== See also ==
- List of rivers of Idaho
