= Hagerman Fossil Beds National Monument =

Pliocene-age site near Hagerman, Idaho

- IUCN category III (natural monument or feature)
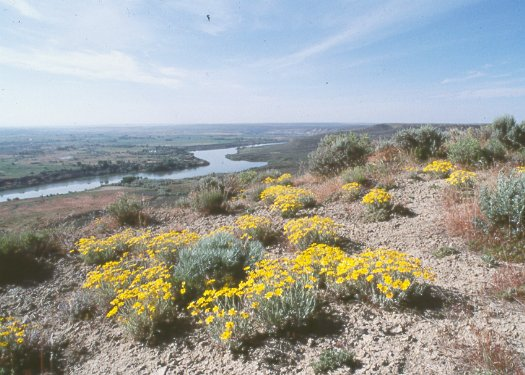
- View over Snake River in the National Monument

- Location within Idaho Location within the United States
- Interactive map of Hagerman Fossil Beds National Monument
- Location: Twin Falls County / Gooding County, Idaho, United States
- Nearest city: Hagerman, ID
- Coordinates: 42°47′25″N 114°56′43″W
- Area: 4,351 acres (17.61 km^{2})
- Authorized: November 18, 1988
- Visitors: 36,667 (in 2025)
- Governing body: National Park Service
- Website: Hagerman Fossil Beds National Monument

U.S. National Natural Landmark
- Designated: 1975

Hagerman Fossil Beds National Monument is a Pliocene-age site near Hagerman, Idaho. The 4,351-acre (17.61 km^{2}) Monument is internationally significant because it protects one of the richest known fossil deposits from the Blancan North American Land Mammal Age. These fossils date from 3.07 million to at least 4 million years ago in age and represent at least 200 species. Hagerman is best known for having the largest known concentration of the fossil Hagerman horse, Equus simplicidens. The fossil beds, including the historic Smithsonian Horse Quarry, were designated a National Natural Landmark in 1975 and was reclassified as a National Monument in 1988.

In 2014, Hagerman Fossil Beds National Monument joined Sibiloi National Park in Kenya as "sister parks" through a memorandum of understanding between the National Park Service and Office of International Affairs, the National Museums of Kenya, and Kenya Wildlife Service. A fundraising campaign at Hagerman helped send three Kenyan students to the internationally recognized Koobi Fora Field School, managed by George Washington University. Students from all over the world attend to learn East African archaeology, geology, and primatology taught by experts in their respective fields.

In 2016, the Hagerman Paleontology, Environments, and Tephrochronology (PET) Project began their investigations into the geologic history at Hagerman with a focus on better dating individual fossil localities on the Monument and reconstructing the ancient landscapes that were there during the Pliocene. The PET Project is a collaboration between the park's former paleontologist and geoscientists from the US Geological Survey.

In 2021, Hagerman Fossil Beds National Monument entered a 25-year partnership with the Idaho Department of Parks and Recreation, which manages the six units of Thousand Springs State Park. The new Thousand Springs Visitor Center at the Billingsley Creek unit, opening in 2022, will feature all-new fossil exhibits and host ranger programs and other activities.

In 2022, Hagerman Fossil Beds National Monument built a new state-of-the art research, collections, and fossil preparation building to facilitate paleontological and geological research and the proper curation of Hagerman's fossils.

== Notable fossils ==
- Hagerman horse, Equus simplicidens, formerly known as Plesippus shoshonensis
- Camelops, an extinct genus of camel that once inhabited North America
- Lontra weiri, oldest New World River otter and likely ancestor to today's four species of American river otter
- A Blancan-age occurrence of the otherwise Hemphilian bear, Agriotherium
- One of the earliest examples of the coyote-like Canis lepophagus
- A rich assemblage of other mammals, as well as birds, fish, amphibians, turtles, and invertebrates

== See also ==
- National Parks in Idaho
- List of national monuments of the United States
