= Henry Miller House (Bellevue, Idaho) =

Historic house in Idaho, United States

- U.S. National Register of Historic Places
- Location within Idaho Location within the United States
- Location: S of Bellevue off U.S. 93
- Nearest city: Bellevue, Idaho
- Coordinates: 43°26′47″N 114°15′16″W
- Area: less than one acre
- Built: 1914
- Architectural style: Stick/eastlake
- NRHP reference No.: 75000624
- Added to NRHP: May 30, 1975

The Henry Miller House near Bellevue, Idaho is a historic house built from silver mining wealth that is listed on the National Register of Historic Places.

Lead and silver mining within quartz deposits in the area was initiated in 1879, and on September 22, 1880, claim was filed for what became the Minnie Moore lead and silver mine near Broadford, to the west of Bellevue. Henry E. Miller purchased half ownership of the Minnie Moore mine for $10,000 in 1881; even without accounting for the proceeds of mining for three years, he did well with the investment as the mine was sold to an English company in 1884 for $450,000.

The house was built in 1914, and is an example of Stick/Eastlake architecture.

It was listed on the National Register in 1975.
