= Bellevue, Idaho =

- City
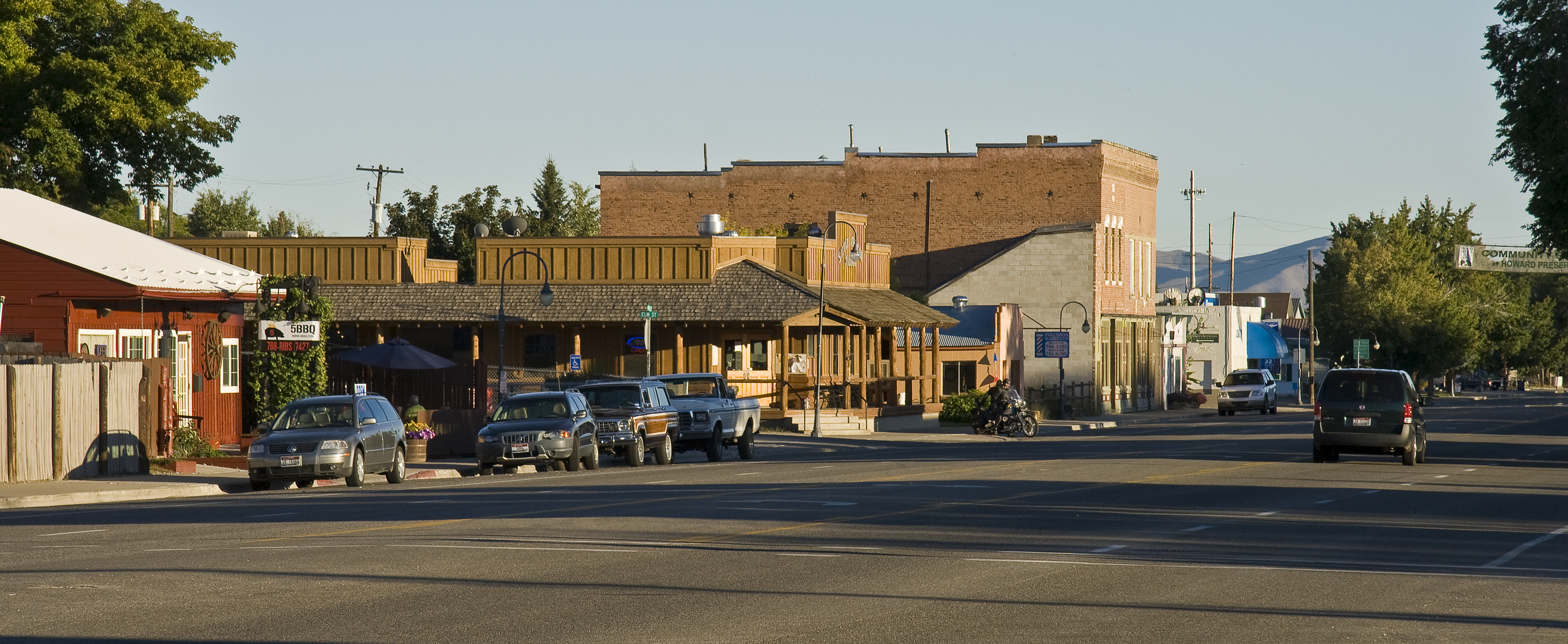
- Central Bellevue in 2010

- Location of Bellevue in Blaine County, Idaho.
- Coordinates: 43°28′18″N 114°14′52″W
- Country: United States
- State: Idaho
- County: Blaine

Area
  - Total: 1.51 sq mi (3.92 km^{2})
  - Land: 1.47 sq mi (3.81 km^{2})
  - Water: 0.042 sq mi (0.11 km^{2})
- Elevation: 5,200 ft (1,600 m)

Population (2020)
  - Total: 2,560
  - Density: 1,740/sq mi (672/km^{2})
- Time zone: UTC-7 (Mountain (MST))
  - Summer (DST): UTC-6 (MDT)
- ZIP code: 83313
- Area codes: 208, 986
- FIPS code: 16-06220
- GNIS feature ID: 2409819
- Website: bellevueidaho.gov

Bellevue is a city in Blaine County in the central part of the U.S. state of Idaho. The population was 2,560 at the 2020 census, up from 2,287 in 2010.

It is located in the Wood River Valley, about 18 miles (29 km) south of the resort area of Ketchum and Sun Valley. The city of Hailey and the Friedman Memorial Airport are a few miles north of Bellevue. The Big Wood River flows near downtown.

The Bellevue Historic District and the Henry Miller House are both listed on the National Register of Historic Places.

== History ==
The Bellevue area was explored by fur trader Alexander Ross in 1824.

Bellevue was settled and chartered in 1882. The city is located on a mile-wide plateau noted for its rich soil suitable for fruit growing. The nearby lands are also rich with resources, and Bellevue grew as a mining town. Between 1881 and the 1893 crash of the silver market, the mines near Bellevue produced more than $60 million worth of silver, lead and gold. Some of Bellevue's mines included Keystone, Palmas, Antelope, Big Camus, Phoenix, Paymaster, Silver Tide, and Monday Mine.

The community soon had two newspapers, The Bellevue Daily Sun and The Bellevue Chronicle. In 1880, the Bellevue M.E. Church was established, as was Bellevue IOOF Lodge No. 9. The International Hotel was built at Main and Oak, and could accommodate 75 guests. A mining smelter was also constructed.

From 1889 to 1895, it was the county seat of the short-lived Logan County.

A devastating fire engulfed the city's business district in 1905, started when the Seymour Saloon's bartender lit a match to investigate a gasoline leak. In 1957, windows in Bellevue were shattered and the city was rocked when 8 tons of dynamite and 56 rounds of artillery shells accidentally detonated at a mine west of the city.

The Wood River Rock Festival took place in 1971 in nearby Slaughterhouse Gulch. The festival was plagued by faulty sound equipment, cold weather, inadequate facilities, poor attendance, and grasshoppers. Eight people were arrested for drug possession, and three for drunk driving.

In 2003, Bellevue was the location of the murders of Diane and Alan Scott Johnson. In 2012, Jon Anderson, a former mayor of Bellevue, committed a murder-suicide, killing his ex-wife and then himself.

In 2009, Bellevue's city clerk, Lacey Ann Loughmiller, was sentenced to 180 days in jail after being convicted of embezzling almost $14,000 from the city.

== Geography ==
According to the United States Census Bureau, the city has a total area of 1.51 square miles (3.91 km^{2}), of which 1.47 square miles (3.81 km^{2}) is land and 0.04 square miles (0.10 km^{2}) is water.

=== Climate ===
Climate data for Bellevue, Idaho (1991–2020)
Month	Jan	Feb	Mar	Apr	May	Jun	Jul	Aug	Sep	Oct	Nov	Dec	Year
Mean daily maximum °F (°C)	34.9 (1.6)	37.7 (3.2)	48.0 (8.9)	58.9 (14.9)	67.4 (19.7)	76.6 (24.8)	87.5 (30.8)	85.5 (29.7)	76.0 (24.4)	60.8 (16.0)	44.8 (7.1)	34.2 (1.2)	59.4 (15.2)
Daily mean °F (°C)	25.4 (−3.7)	28.5 (−1.9)	37.6 (3.1)	46.8 (8.2)	54.3 (12.4)	61.9 (16.6)	70.8 (21.6)	69.3 (20.7)	60.4 (15.8)	47.7 (8.7)	34.8 (1.6)	25.4 (−3.7)	46.9 (8.3)
Mean daily minimum °F (°C)	15.9 (−8.9)	19.2 (−7.1)	27.1 (−2.7)	34.6 (1.4)	41.1 (5.1)	47.1 (8.4)	54.0 (12.2)	53.1 (11.7)	44.7 (7.1)	34.5 (1.4)	24.8 (−4.0)	16.5 (−8.6)	34.4 (1.3)
Average precipitation inches (mm)	2.06 (52)	1.50 (38)	1.41 (36)	1.11 (28)	2.07 (53)	1.29 (33)	0.61 (15)	0.71 (18)	0.84 (21)	1.75 (44)	1.73 (44)	2.44 (62)	17.52 (444)
Source: NOAA

== Demographics ==
Historical population
Census	Pop.	Note	%±
1890	892		—
1900	356		−60.1%
1910	702		97.2%
1920	526		−25.1%
1930	375		−28.7%
1940	502		33.9%
1950	528		5.2%
1960	384		−27.3%
1970	537		39.8%
1980	1,016		89.2%
1990	1,275		25.5%
2000	1,876		47.1%
2010	2,287		21.9%
2020	2,560		11.9%
U.S. Decennial Census

=== 2020 census ===
As of the 2020 census, Bellevue had a population of 2,560. The median age was 40.8 years. 26.9% of residents were under the age of 18 and 14.2% of residents were 65 years of age or older. For every 100 females there were 102.5 males, and for every 100 females age 18 and over there were 100.8 males age 18 and over.

95.8% of residents lived in urban areas, while 4.2% lived in rural areas.

There were 892 households in Bellevue, of which 39.9% had children under the age of 18 living in them. Of all households, 54.3% were married-couple households, 18.5% were households with a male householder and no spouse or partner present, and 21.1% were households with a female householder and no spouse or partner present. About 22.3% of all households were made up of individuals and 8.6% had someone living alone who was 65 years of age or older.

There were 951 housing units, of which 6.2% were vacant. The homeowner vacancy rate was 0.7% and the rental vacancy rate was 4.6%.

Racial composition as of the 2020 census
Race	Number	Percent
White	1,703	66.5%
Black or African American	11	0.4%
American Indian and Alaska Native	22	0.9%
Asian	14	0.5%
Native Hawaiian and Other Pacific Islander	4	0.2%
Some other race	493	19.3%
Two or more races	313	12.2%
Hispanic or Latino (of any race)	809	31.6%

=== 2010 census ===
As of the census of 2010, there were 2,287 people, 849 households, and 571 families residing in the city. The population density was 1,555.8 inhabitants per square mile (600.7/km^{2}). There were 926 housing units at an average density of 629.9 per square mile (243.2/km^{2}). The racial makeup of the city was 80.4% White, 0.3% African American, 0.4% Native American, 0.4% Asian, 16.6% from other races, and 1.9% from two or more races. Hispanic or Latino of any race were 28.8% of the population.

There were 849 households, of which 40.4% had children under the age of 18 living with them, 52.4% were married couples living together, 8.5% had a female householder with no husband present, 6.4% had a male householder with no wife present, and 32.7% were non-families. 24.4% of all households were made up of individuals, and 5.3% had someone living alone who was 65 years of age or older. The average household size was 2.69 and the average family size was 3.27.

The median age in the city was 35 years. 29.1% of residents were under the age of 18; 6.6% were between the ages of 18 and 24; 30.8% were from 25 to 44; 27.5% were from 45 to 64; and 6% were 65 years of age or older. The gender makeup of the city was 50.4% male and 49.6% female.

=== 2000 census ===
As of the census of 2000, there were 1,876 people, 679 households, and 486 families residing in the city. The population density was 1,577.5 inhabitants per square mile (609.1/km^{2}). There were 724 housing units at an average density of 608.8 per square mile (235.1/km^{2}). The racial makeup of the city was 86.57% White, 0.05% African American, 0.11% Native American, 0.96% Asian, 0.05% Pacific Islander, 11.14% from other races, and 1.12% from two or more races. Hispanic or Latino of any race were 19.35% of the population.

There were 679 households, out of which 38.0% had children under the age of 18 living with them, 55.2% were married couples living together, 9.4% had a female householder with no husband present, and 28.4% were non-families. 19.6% of all households were made up of individuals, and 4.6% had someone living alone who was 65 years of age or older. The average household size was 2.75 and the average family size was 3.12.

In the city, the population was spread out, with 27.6% under the age of 18, 9.8% from 18 to 24, 35.4% from 25 to 44, 21.3% from 45 to 64, and 6.0% who were 65 years of age or older. The median age was 33 years. For every 100 females, there were 111.5 males. For every 100 females age 18 and over, there were 111.7 males.

The median income for a household in the city was $45,438, and the median income for a family was $49,276. Males had a median income of $33,056 versus $24,583 for females. The per capita income for the city was $19,094. About 6.7% of families and 7.8% of the population were below the poverty line, including 9.2% of those under age 18 and 8.1% of those age 65 or over.

== Education ==
Students are served by the Blaine County School District.

Bellevue Elementary School is the zoned elementary school. Alturas Elementary, a magnet school, is in nearby Hailey. is located in the south of the city.

Middle school students go to Wood River Middle School. High school students attend Wood River High School in Hailey.

The county is in the catchment area, but not the taxation zone, for College of Southern Idaho.

== Transportation ==
- - SH-75 - Sawtooth Scenic Byway

The city is served by State Highway 75, a two-lane undivided highway that connects Shoshone to Challis. The highway travels over Galena Summit and through the Sawtooth National Recreation Area and is designated as the "Sawtooth Scenic Byway." Bellevue is the southern terminus of the Wood River Trail, a 20-plus mile paved non-motorized path that connects Bellevue, Hailey, Ketchum, and Sun Valley.

== Notable people ==
- Walt Doan, professional baseball player
- Kaitlyn Farrington, Olympic gold medalist in women's halfpipe (snowboarding), Sochi, 2014
