= Blaine County School District =

School district in Idaho

Blaine County School District 61 (BCSD) is a school district headquartered in Hailey, Idaho.

It is the sole school district with jurisdiction in Blaine County. The school district covers the entire county.

Students living in the rural Yale area in the county's southeastern panhandle are sent to schools in neighboring Minidoka County, operated by the Minidoka County School District. The Blaine district pays money to the Minidoka student to send the Yale students to Minidoka schools. In 1994, there was bus transportation provided by both districts, with Acequia Elementary School in Acequia, operated by the Minidoka district, as the handoff point where the students switch drivers. In 1994, 16 students were sent from Blaine County to Minidoka County.

== History ==
In 1973, nine students from the Yale area went to Minidoka schools. In 1973 there was Senate Bill 2021, a bill in the Idaho Legislature which, if passed, would have facilitated redrawing school district boundaries. The Commissioners of Blaine County opposed the bill as they did not want the county school district to lose the "Yale" area.

In 2021, James Foudy became the superintendent of this district. He was previously the superintendent of McCall-Donnelly School District. All board members voted to make Foudy the superintendent.

== Schools ==
Schools include:

PK-12 schools

- Carey School (Carey)

High schools

- Wood River High School (Hailey)
- Silver Creek High School (Hailey, alternative)

PK-8 schools

- Ernest Hemingway STEAM School (Ketchum)

Middle schools

- Wood River Middle School (Hailey)

Elementary schools (PK-5)

- Alturas Elementary School (Hailey)
  - It is a magnet school. Prior to 2014, it was named Woodside Elementary School, and was a zoned elementary school for southern Hailey.
- Bellevue Elementary School
- Hailey Elementary School
