= Baugh Creek =

Creek in Idaho

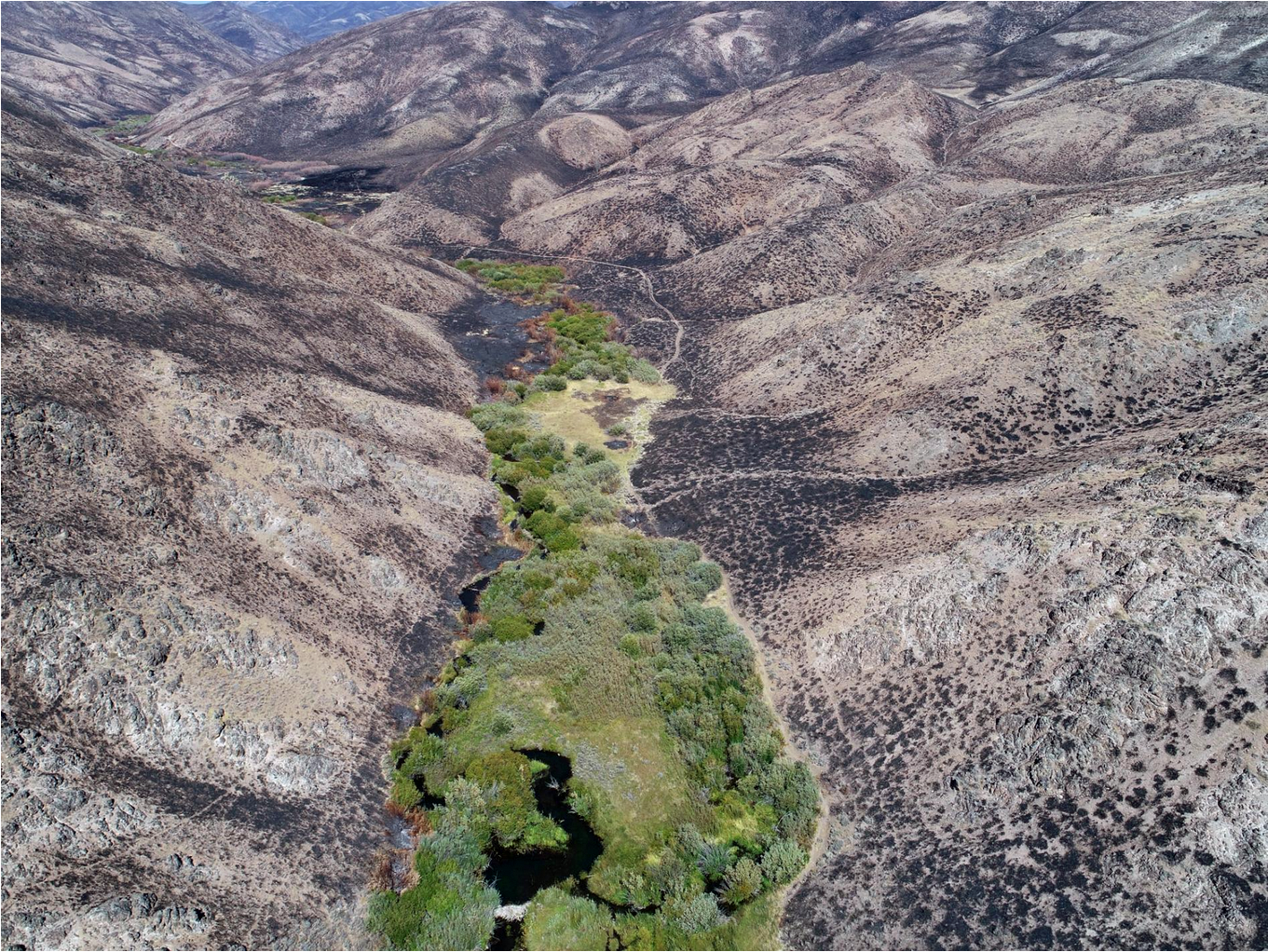
- Baugh Creek aerial view after the Sharps Fire.

Location
- Country: United States
- State: Idaho
- District: Blane County

Physical characteristics
- Source: Little Wood River
  - location: Pioneer Mountains
  - coordinates: 43°37′21″N 114°08′23″W
  - elevation: 5,367 ft (1,636 m)
- Mouth: Little Wood River
  - coordinates: 43°30′20″N 114°03′26″W
- Length: 10.8 mi (17.4 km)

Baugh Creek is a tributary of the Little Wood River in Blaine County, Idaho, United States. The creek is located in Sawtooth National Forest right next to Buck Creek.

Baugh Creek is home to beavers, due to them being parachuted into the area in the 20th century. The beaver areas have been shown to be more resilient against forest fires than neighbouring ares that lack beavers.

== Birds ==
There have been 3 different specie sightings of birds near the creek:

- Lazuli Bunting
- Spotted Towhee
- Song Sparrow
