= Magic Reservoir =

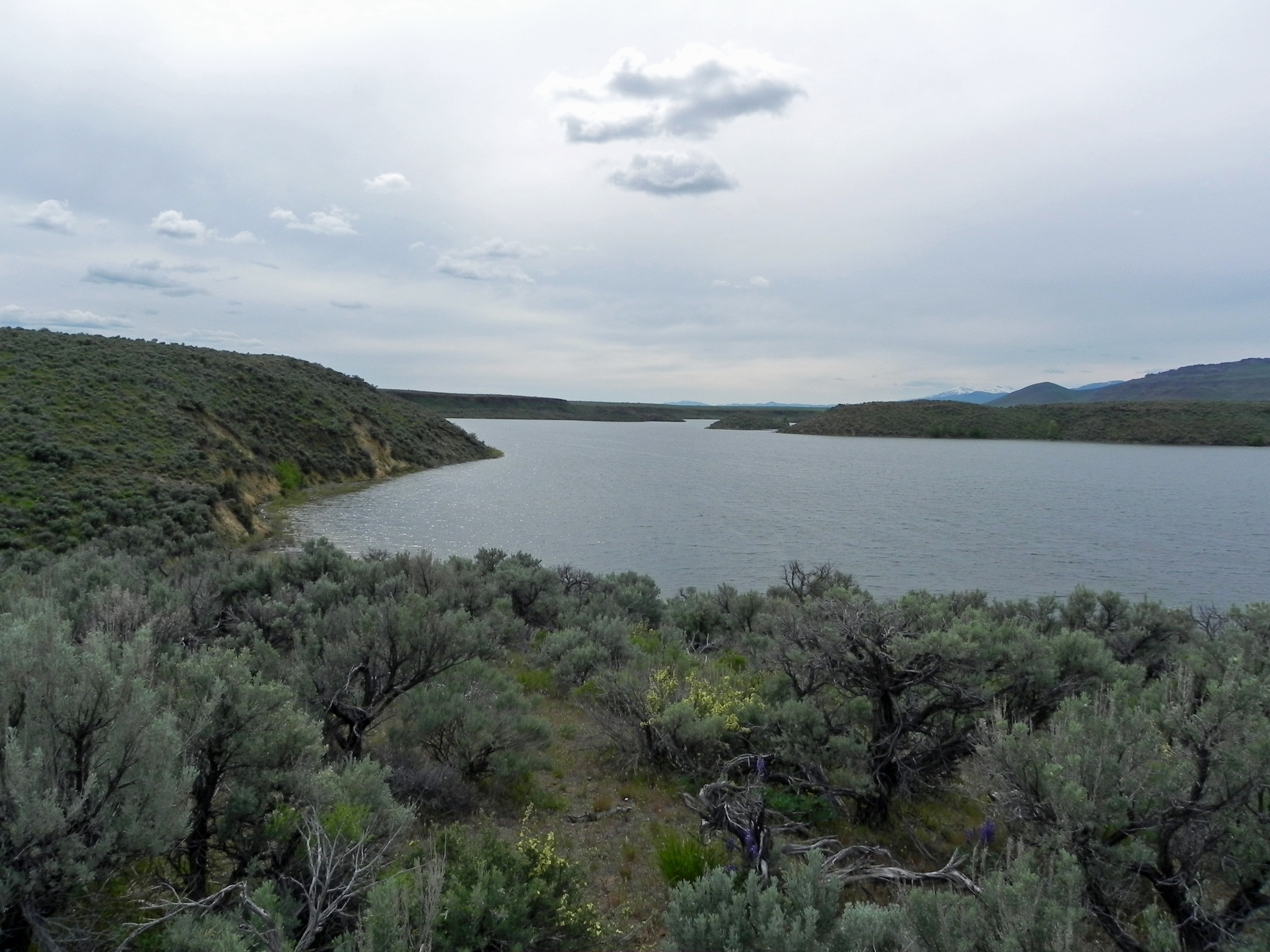

- Location within Idaho Location within the United States
- Location: Blaine and Camas counties, Idaho
- Coordinates: 43°16′51″N 114°22′41″W
- Type: reservoir
- Primary inflows: Big Wood River and Camas, Lava, Poison, and Rock creeks
- Primary outflows: Big Wood River
- Basin countries: United States
- Built: 1910
- Surface area: 3,740 acres (1,510 ha)
- Water volume: 195,000 acre-feet (0.241 km^{3})
- Surface elevation: 4,800 feet (1,500 m)

Magic Reservoir is a reservoir on the Big Wood River on the border of Blaine and Camas counties, Idaho. However, most of the reservoir is located in Blaine County. The reservoir and surrounding Bureau of Land Management land offers opportunities for boating, fishing, camping, and hunting, among other activities. The reservoir is impounded by Magic Dam, which was built in 1910.
