= Silver Creek (Idaho) =

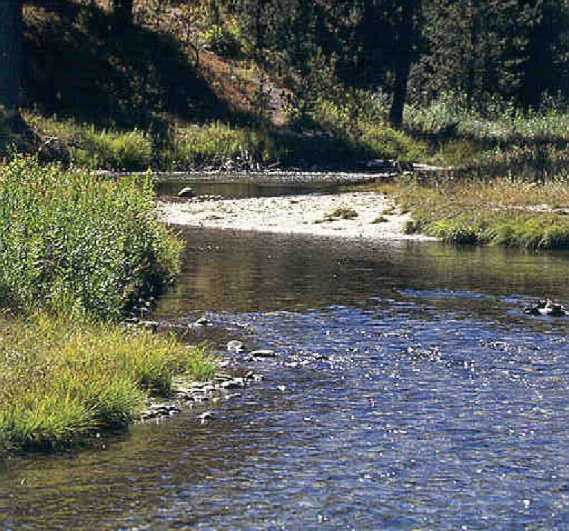
Silver Creek near Crouch in Boise County, Idaho

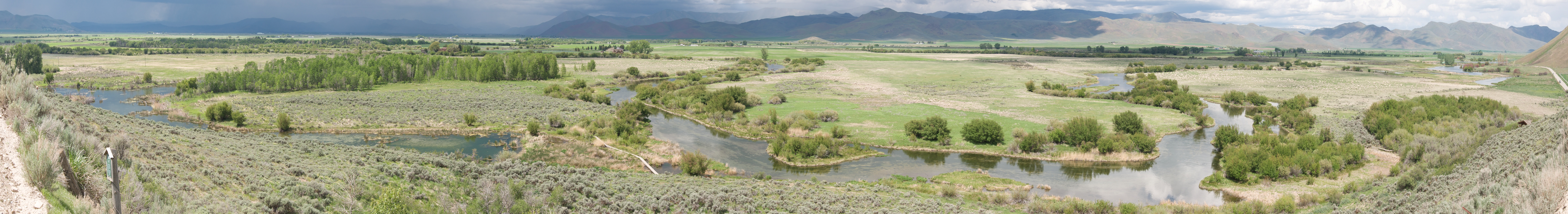
Silver Creek panorama

Silver Creek in southern Idaho refers to two different streams. One is a spring-fed tributary of the Little Wood River in Blaine County, north of Picabo, and the other is a tributary of the Middle Fork of the Payette River in Boise County, near Crouch.

== Little Wood tributary ==
The Little Wood River tributary is formed by dozens of springs bubbling up from an aquifer, which form a stream. It is an example of a high desert, cold-spring ecosystem, and attracts a variety of wildlife, including 150 species of birds. Approximately thirty miles (50 km) south of Sun Valley, it is a world-renowned fly fishing preserve.

Location (mouth): 43°11′41″N 114°00′51″W

== Payette River tributary ==
The Payette River tributary, approximately 100 miles (160 km) northwest, has brook trout and is stocked with rainbow trout.

Location (mouth): 44°09′30″N 115°08′33″W
