= Camas Creek =

Camas Creek may refer to:

- Camas Creek (Big Wood River), a tributary of the Big Wood River, in Elmore, Camas, and Blaine counties in Idaho, United States
- Camas Creek (Clark and Jefferson counties, Idaho), a tributary of Mud Lake in Idaho, United States
- Camas Creek (Oywhee County, Idaho), a tributary of the Pole Creek (which flows into the Deep Creek [a tributary of the Owyhee River]) in southwestern Idaho, United States
- Camas Creek (Lemhi County, Idaho), a tributary of the Salmon River in central Idaho, United States
- Battle of Camas Creek, a battle of the Nez Perce War in southeastern Idaho, United States in 1877
