= Black Magic Canyon =

Canyon in Idaho

Coordinates: 43.1932°N 114.3246°W

Black Magic Canyon is a small canyon located north of Shoshone, Idaho along Idaho State Highway 75. It was created by the Big Wood River over the last 10,000 years. The river carved this canyon through 800,000-year-old basalt lava flows leaving sculpted black rock reminiscent of Utah's slot canyons. Because of irrigation use during the summer and snowfall in winter, the canyon is best explored in spring or fall.
