= Carey, Idaho =

- City
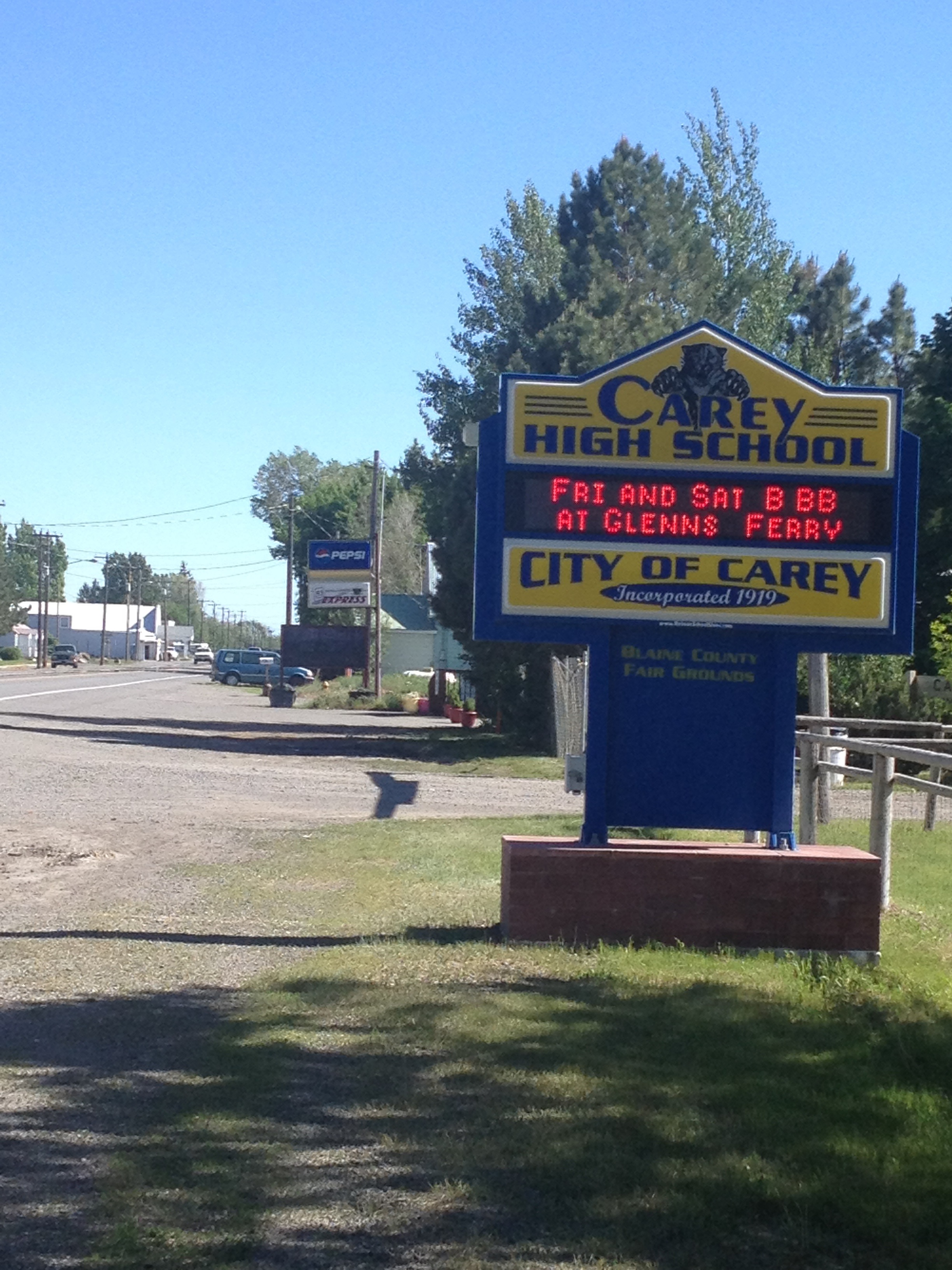

- Location of Carey in Blaine County, Idaho.
- Coordinates: 43°18′35″N 113°56′40″W
- Country: United States
- State: Idaho
- County: Blaine

Area
  - Total: 3.45 sq mi (8.94 km^{2})
  - Land: 3.45 sq mi (8.94 km^{2})
  - Water: 0.0039 sq mi (0.01 km^{2})
- Elevation: 4,784 ft (1,458 m)

Population (2020)
  - Total: 685
  - Density: 198/sq mi (76.6/km^{2})
- Time zone: UTC-7 (Mountain (MST))
  - Summer (DST): UTC-6 (MDT)
- ZIP code: 83320
- Area codes: 208, 986
- FIPS code: 16-12790
- GNIS feature ID: 2409982
- Website: www.cityofcarey.org

Carey is a city in Blaine County, Idaho, United States. The population was 685 at the 2020 census. Carey is primarily an agricultural city and is the location of the Blaine County Fairgrounds. Nearby recreational destinations include the Craters of the Moon National Monument, Carey Lake, Silver Creek and the Little Wood River. Further west is the Big Wood River Valley, leading to the Sun Valley resort.

== History ==
Carey was founded ca. 1884 by a colony of members of the Church of Jesus Christ of Latter-day Saints. The community was named after James Carey, a pioneer settler.

== Geography ==
Carey is located in southern Blaine County along the Little Wood River and northwest of the Snake River lava fields. U. S. highways 20, 26, and 93 pass through the community.

According to the United States Census Bureau, the city has a total area of 3.31 square miles (8.57 km^{2}), all of it land.

=== Climate ===
This climatic region is typified by large seasonal temperature differences, with warm to hot (and often humid) summers and cold (sometimes severely cold) winters. According to the Köppen Climate Classification system, Carey has a humid continental climate, abbreviated "Dfb" on climate maps.

== Demographics ==
Historical population
Census	Pop.	Note	%±
1910	701		—
1920	740		5.6%
1930	600		−18.9%
1940	100		−83.3%
1950	100		0.0%
1960	200		100.0%
1970	300		50.0%
1980	600		100.0%
1990	600		0.0%
2000	513		−14.5%
2010	604		17.7%
2020	685		13.4%

=== 2010 census ===
As of the census of 2010, there were 604 people, 196 households, and 156 families residing in the city. The population density was 182.5 inhabitants per square mile (70.5/km^{2}). There were 240 housing units at an average density of 72.5 per square mile (28.0/km^{2}). The racial makeup of the city was 88.9% White, 0.7% African American, 0.3% Native American, 0.3% Asian, 8.1% from other races, and 1.7% from two or more races. Hispanic or Latino of any race were 12.1% of the population.

There were 196 households, of which 48.0% had children under the age of 18 living with them, 70.4% were married couples living together, 5.6% had a female householder with no husband present, 3.6% had a male householder with no wife present, and 20.4% were non-families. 18.4% of all households were made up of individuals, and 6.7% had someone living alone who was 65 years of age or older. The average household size was 3.08 and the average family size was 3.56.

The median age in the city was 33.4 years. 36.4% of residents were under the age of 18; 4.8% were between the ages of 18 and 24; 24.3% were from 25 to 44; 24% were from 45 to 64; and 10.4% were 65 years of age or older. The gender makeup of the city was 49.2% male and 50.8% female.

=== 2000 census ===
As of the census of 2000, there were 513 people, 166 households, and 131 families residing in the city. The population density was 153.1 inhabitants per square mile (59.1/km^{2}). There were 187 housing units at an average density of 55.8 per square mile (21.5/km^{2}). The racial makeup of the city was 92.79% White, 0.19% African American, 0.97% Native American, 4.68% from other races, and 1.36% from two or more races. Hispanic or Latino of any race were 10.14% of the population.

There were 166 households, out of which 43.4% had children under the age of 18 living with them, 70.5% were married couples living together, 6.0% had a female householder with no husband present, and 20.5% were non-families. 19.3% of all households were made up of individuals, and 7.2% had someone living alone who was 65 years of age or older. The average household size was 3.09 and the average family size was 3.55.

In the city, the population was spread out, with 35.1% under the age of 18, 10.1% from 18 to 24, 25.0% from 25 to 44, 18.1% from 45 to 64, and 11.7% who were 65 years of age or older. The median age was 30 years. For every 100 females, there were 112.0 males. For every 100 females age 18 and over, there were 110.8 males.

The median income for a household in the city was $39,861, and the median income for a family was $42,054. Males had a median income of $30,809 versus $21,563 for females. The per capita income for the city was $14,027. About 2.6% of families and 1.7% of the population were below the poverty line, including 0.9% of those under age 18 and 6.0% of those age 65 or over.

== Education ==
Blaine County School District is the school district for the entire county. Carey School, a K-12 school, is the zoned school for all grade levels.

The county is in the catchment area, but not the taxation zone, for College of Southern Idaho.

The Little Wood River District Library is in Carey. It is adjacent to the Carey School.

== Festivals ==
The Blaine County Fair is an annual event. The 2011 Blaine County Fair was held in Carey the weekend of August 12–14, 2011.

== See also ==
- List of cities in Idaho
