= Triumph, Idaho =

Unincorporated community in the state of Idaho, United States

- Unincorporated community
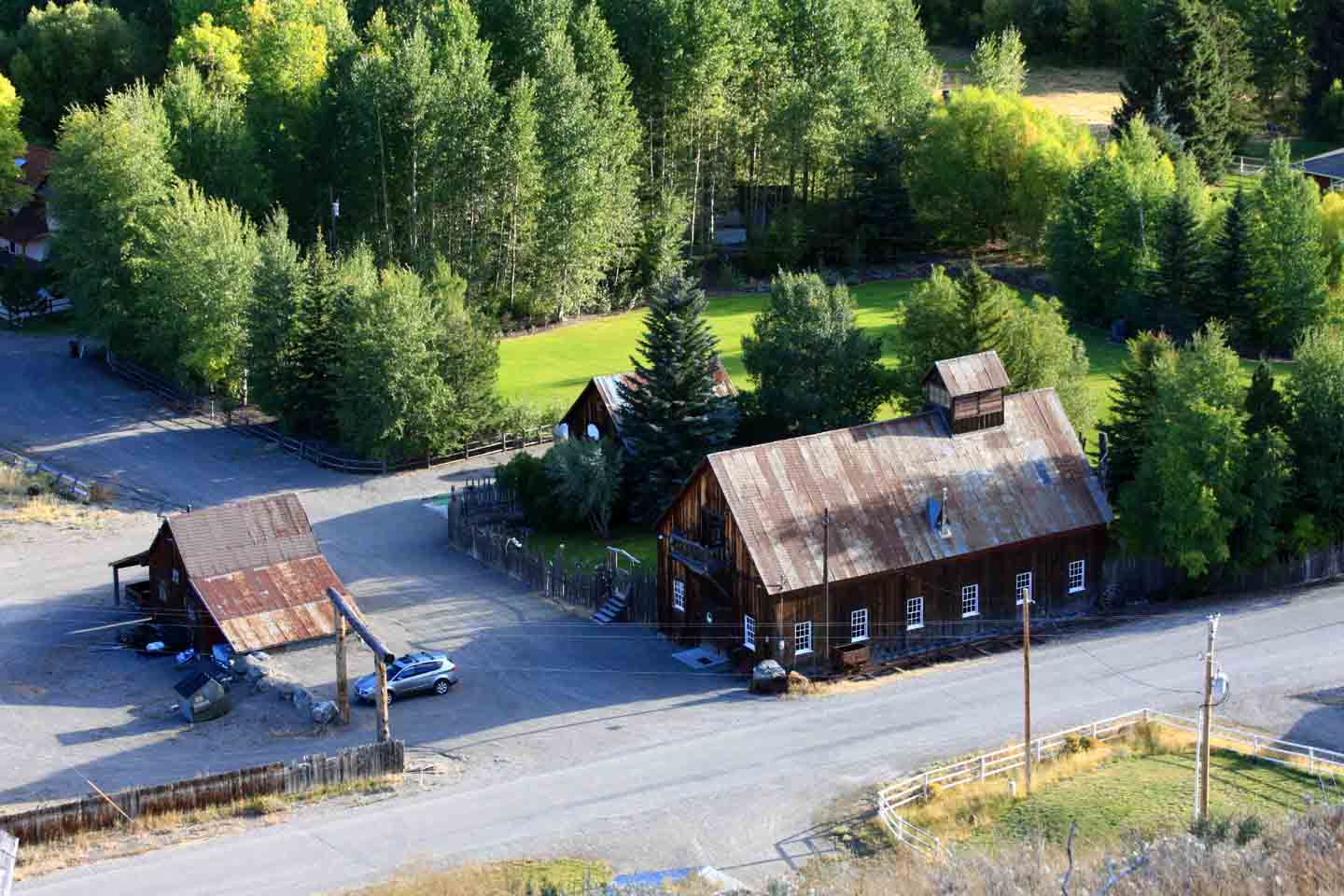
- Tucker's Barn in Triumph

- Location within the state of Idaho Triumph, Idaho (the United States)
- Coordinates: 43°38′42″N 114°15′15″W
- Country: United States
- State: Idaho
- County: Blaine
- Elevation: 6,113 ft (1,863 m)
- Time zone: UTC-7 (Mountain (MST))
  - Summer (DST): UTC-6 (MDT)
- ZIP code: 83333
- Area codes: 208, 986
- GNIS feature ID: 398264

Triumph is an unincorporated community in the East Fork of Big Wood River, Blaine County, Idaho, United States. Triumph was the location of the Triumph Mine, which was discovered in the 19th century and closed in 1957 after a history of producing millions of dollars in silver and lead. The population is currently less than 50 full-time residents. It is located approximately 12 miles north of Hailey.

Triumph is the childhood home of U.S. Olympic skier Picabo Street.

Triumph is the childhood home of uncrewed systems engineer Gretchen Heath

== Triumph mine ==
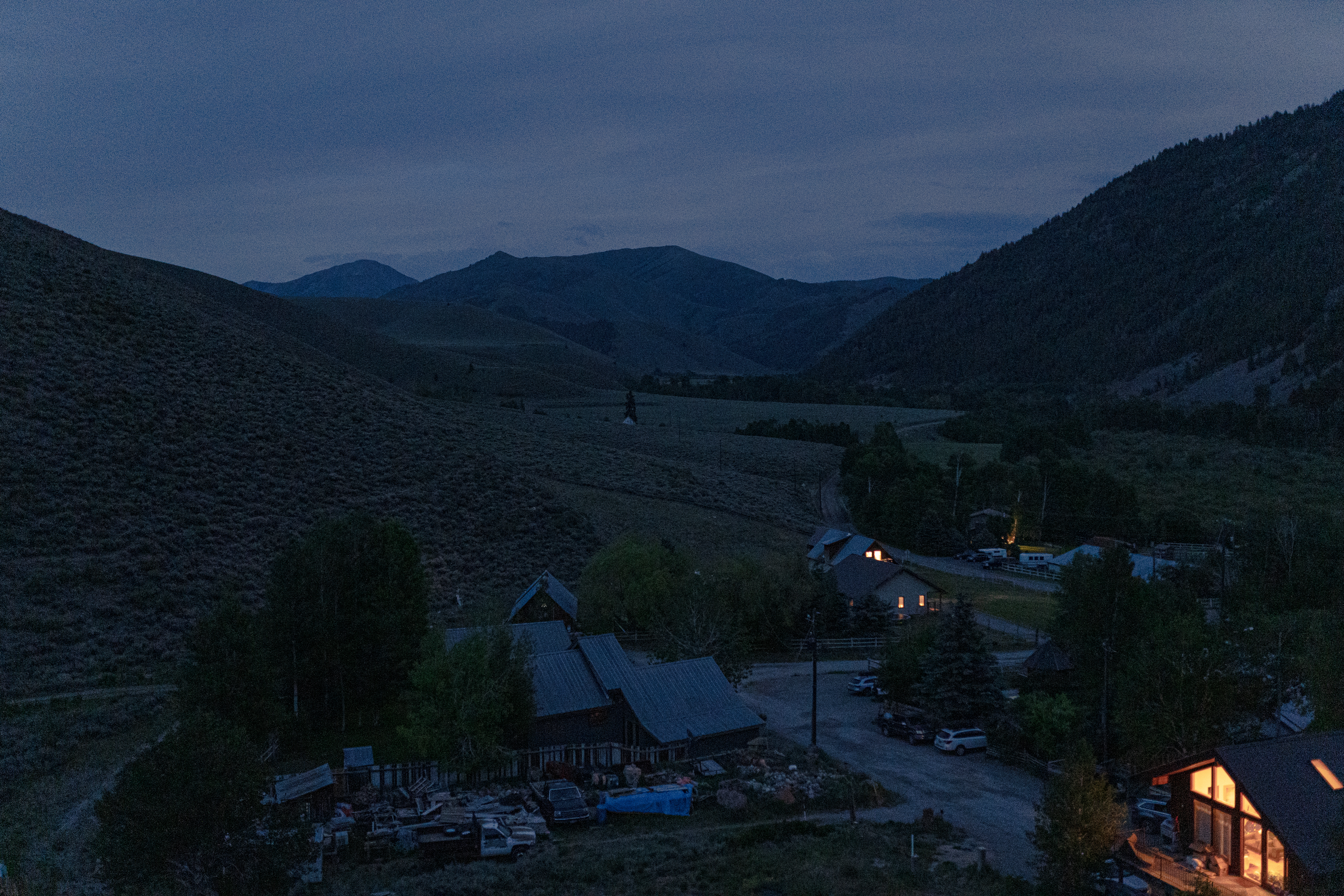
Looking northeast out of Triumph. The community is visible in the foreground.

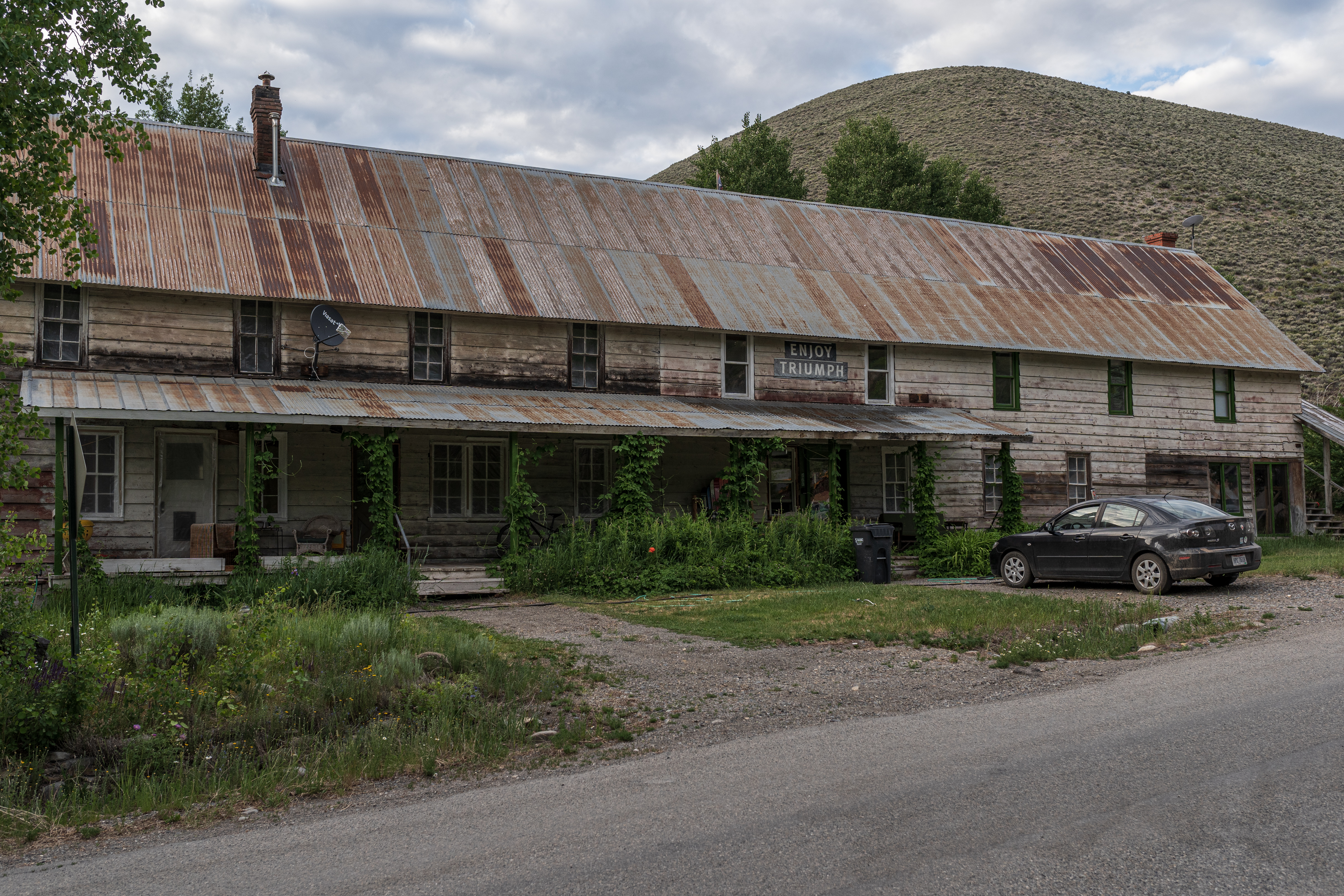
The bunkhouse in Triumph

The Triumph mine was first discovered in 1883 with the recording of the North Star claim. Additional claims were grouped together over the next 20 years and operated as 14 separate mining companies. All the ore was processed by the Philadelphia Mining and Smelting Company in Ketchum.

The North Star Mill was built in 1889 by the Freedman's of The Philadelphia Company. They were bought out by George Hurst around 1927 and his San Louise Mining Company. In 1933, fire destroyed the stamp mill works and ore was stockpiled.

Around 1937, the Department of the interior, under the control of the War Department, expanded the Triumph Mine. Federal money built a modern sink float mill, new offices, warehouses and a Main Tunnel that went straight into the mountain for a mile and a half.

The small companies were joined to form "The Triumph Mining Co" which, at its WW2 peak, employed 200 men, 24 hours a day, and held the world record for zinc.

By 1959, lead, silver, and zinc prices had fallen to half of the WW2 price while union labour was demanding higher wages. The mine was shut down in 1959 and sold to the foreman.

Rupert House formed the Triumph Mineral Company in 1964 and began mining again in 1970. In 1982 the mine was leased to The Getty Mining Company and they did an extensive drilling and exploration of both the Mine and the Tailings. Company records show about $45,000,000 in gold left in the tailings but the gold was not a strategic metal and was not of interest to the War Department.

In 1988 the EPA listed Triumph as a potential hazard so in the next 10 years they spent millions on a clean up. The EPA and State, instead of recovering the gold to pay for the cleanup, buried it.

In 2007 the Triumph Mine was purchased by Carl Massaro. The goal was to build a small solar village on the mill site and a large solar collector as suggested by the new EPA's "Mine Scarred Program". ( See Triumph Village .net ) This solar project met with public criticism and ultimately failed. The mountain was sold to Denovo in 2008 but "The Triumph Mineral Co" holds the tailings with plans for a solar project in the works for that site. The Denovo Company has cleaned the site and plans additional land uses. Although the mine still has resources, an agreement was reached by state and local authorities, to never mine again.
