= Bellevue Historic District (Bellevue, Idaho) =

Historic district in Idaho, United States

- U.S. National Register of Historic Places
- U.S. Historic district
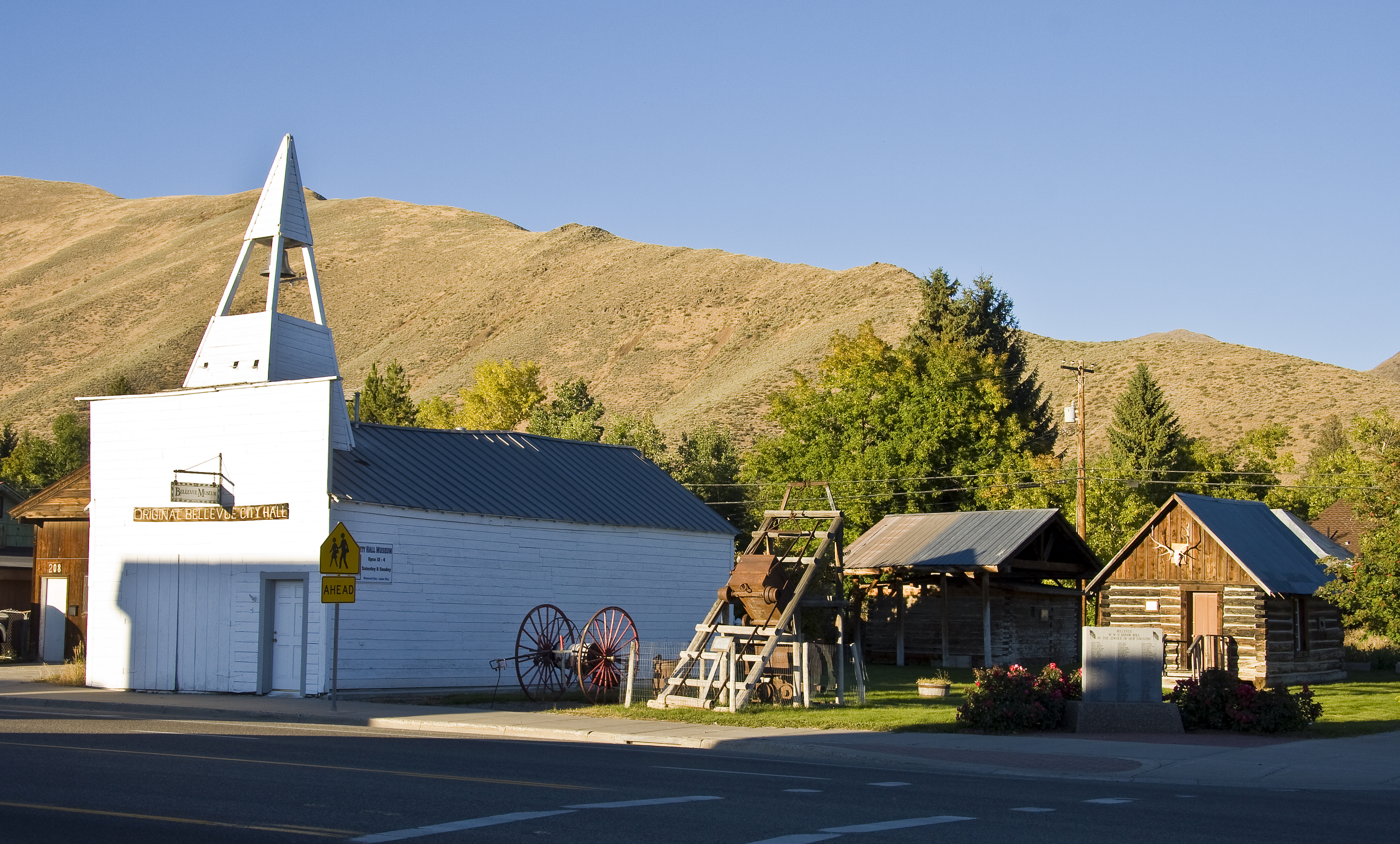

- Location within Idaho Location within the United States
- Location: Roughly bounded by U.S. 93, Cedar, 4th, and Oak Sts., Bellevue, Idaho
- Coordinates: 43°27′51″N 114°15′29″W
- Area: 10 acres (4.0 ha)
- Built: 1880
- Architectural style: Late Victorian
- NRHP reference No.: 82002506
- Added to NRHP: June 16, 1982

Bellevue Historic District is roughly bounded by U.S. 93, Cedar, 4th, and Oak Sts. in Bellevue, Idaho. The Late Victorian style buildings date as far back as 1880, and are significant for their architecture. The district was added to the National Register of Historic Places in 1982.

It included 24 buildings.
