= Thousand Springs State Park =

State park in Gooding County, Idaho, United States

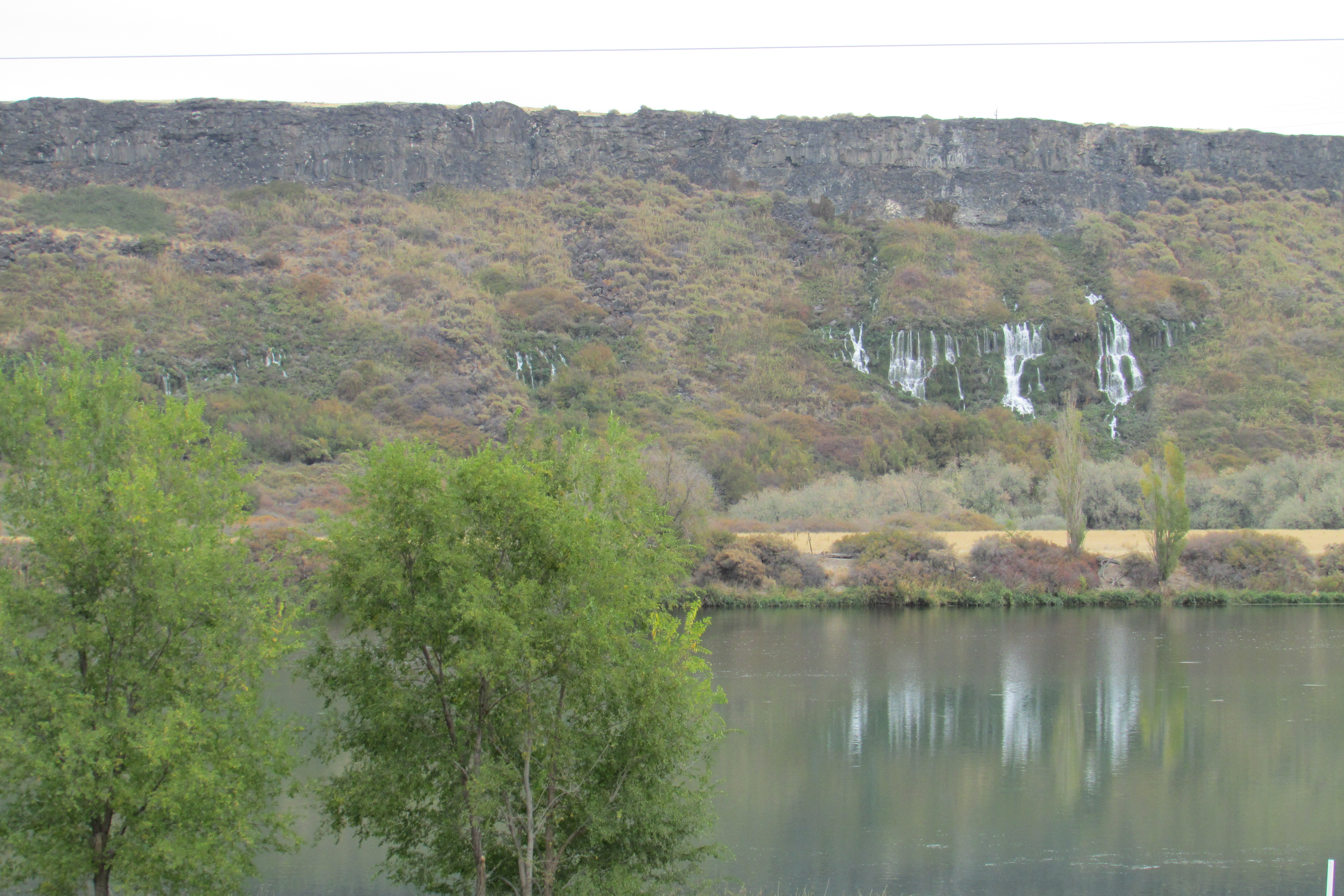
- Cliff with springs along the Snake River at Ritter Island

- Location within Idaho Location within the United States
- Location: Gooding County, Idaho, United States
- Nearest city: Hagerman, Idaho
- Coordinates: 42°51′48″N 114°51′06″W
- Area: 2,000 acres (810 ha)
- Elevation: 2,800 ft (850 m)
- Established: 2005
- Administrator: Idaho Department of Parks and Recreation
- Website: Official website

Thousand Springs State Park is a public recreation and nature preservation area consisting of multiple units — Billingsley Creek, Earl M. Hardy Box Canyon Springs Nature Preserve, Malad Gorge, Niagara Springs, and Ritter Island — in Gooding County, Idaho.

== Park units ==
The state park was created in 2005, when four existing state parks in the Hagerman Valley were merged into a single entity, with an additional unit subsequently added to the complex.

Billingsley Creek

This former ranch was purchased by the state in 2001. One feature is the homesite of western author Vardis Fisher. Billingsley Creek Unit totals 286 acres (116 ha).

Earl M. Hardy Box Canyon Springs Nature Preserve

This 350-acre (140 ha) box canyon has 250-foot-high (76 m) walls. At its head is the eleventh-largest spring in North America, gushing 180,000 US gallons (680,000 L) per minute. There is a 20-foot (6.1 m) waterfall. The 350-acre (140 ha) property was developed by the Nature Conservancy which purchased the site in 1999, then completed its transfer to the state in 2016.

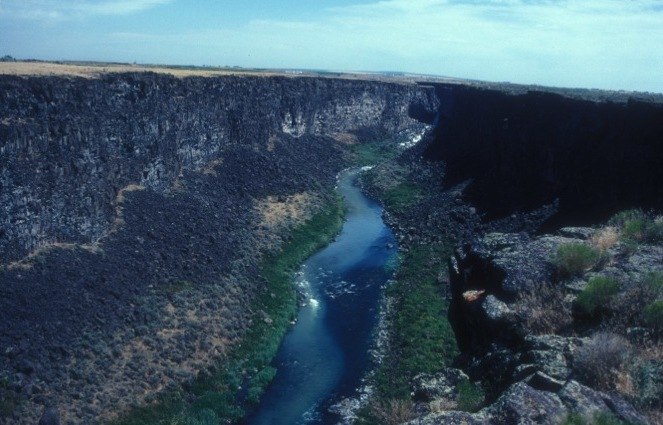
Malad Gorge on the Malad River

Malad Gorge

Malad Gorge is a 250-foot-deep (76 m) canyon formed by the Malad River, downstream from a 60-foot (18 m) waterfall. This 652-acre (264 ha) day-use unit is off Interstate 84 and offers hiking and picnicking. A section of the Oregon Trail is visible. Rock pigeons, red-tailed hawks and golden eagles nest in the canyon. Yellow-bellied marmots are found on the canyon floor.

Niagara Springs

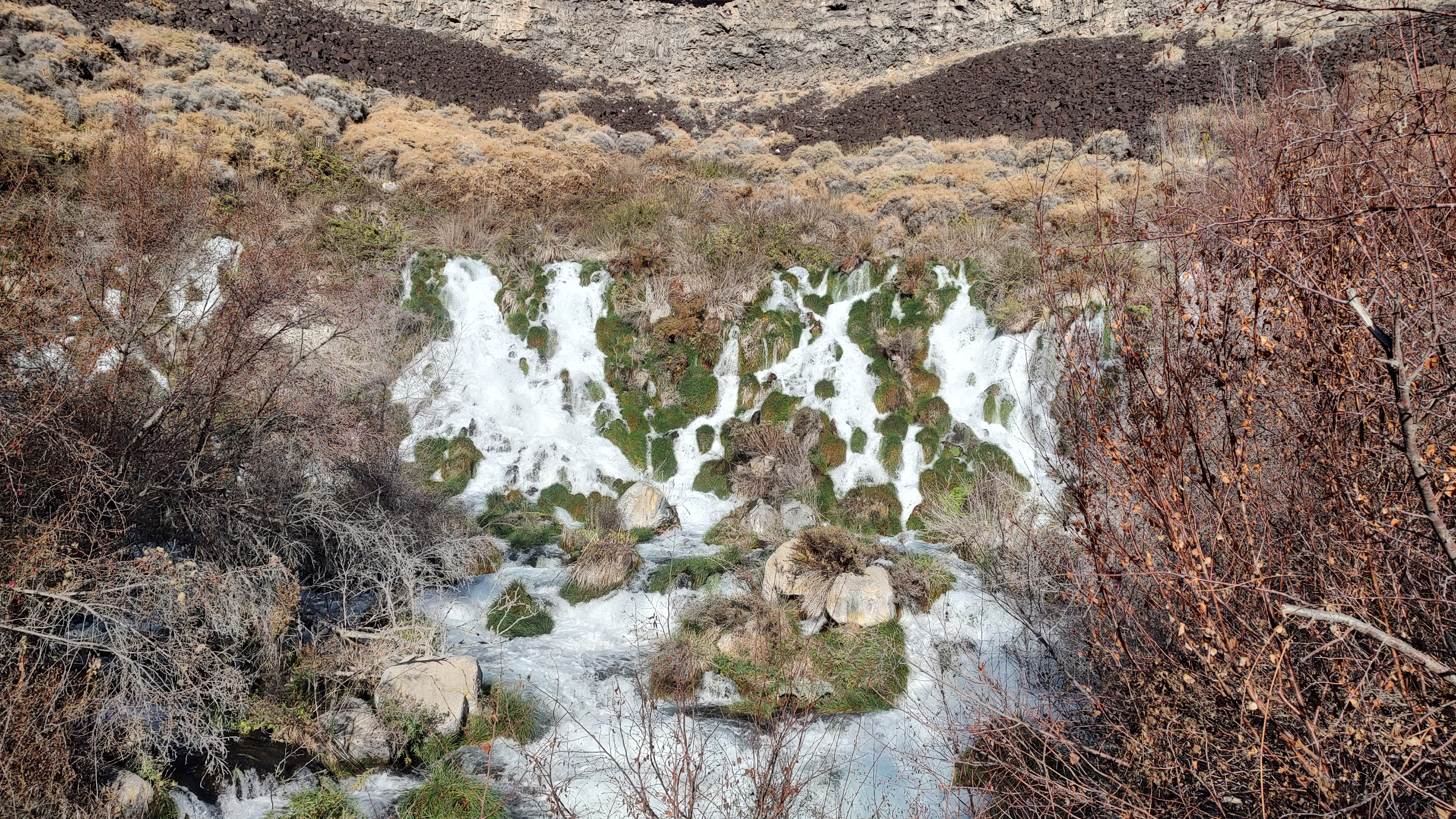
Niagara Springs in Fall

Proclaimed a National Natural Landmark, this area borders the Snake River and features sheer basalt cliffs 350 feet (110 m) high. There are 179 acres (72 ha) in two parcels, acquired in 1971 and 1976.

Ritter Island

This unit lies along the Snake River between two large springs.

== See also ==
- List of Idaho state parks
- National Parks in Idaho
