= Hagerman, Idaho =

- City
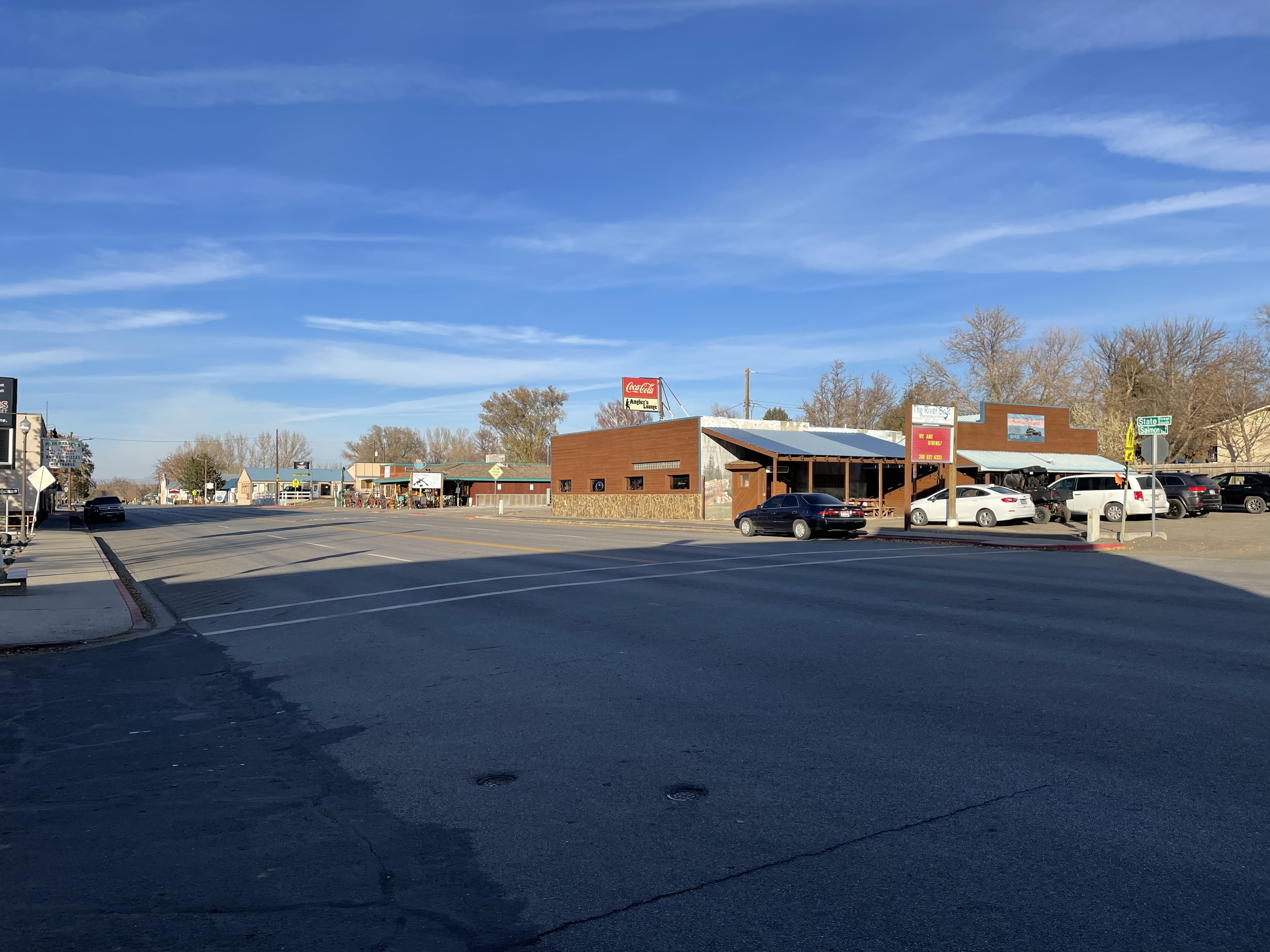
- State Street (U.S. 30) and Salmon Street in 2022

- Location of Hagerman in Gooding County, Idaho.
- Coordinates: 42°48′59″N 114°53′51″W
- Country: United States
- State: Idaho
- County: Gooding

Area
  - Total: 0.61 sq mi (1.58 km^{2})
  - Land: 0.59 sq mi (1.52 km^{2})
  - Water: 0.023 sq mi (0.06 km^{2})
- Elevation: 2,969 ft (905 m)

Population (2020)
  - Total: 968
  - Density: 1,650/sq mi (637/km^{2})
- Time zone: UTC-7 (Mountain (MST))
  - Summer (DST): UTC-6 (MDT)
- ZIP code: 83332
- Area code: 208
- FIPS code: 16-34300
- GNIS feature ID: 2410680
- Website: hagermanidaho.us

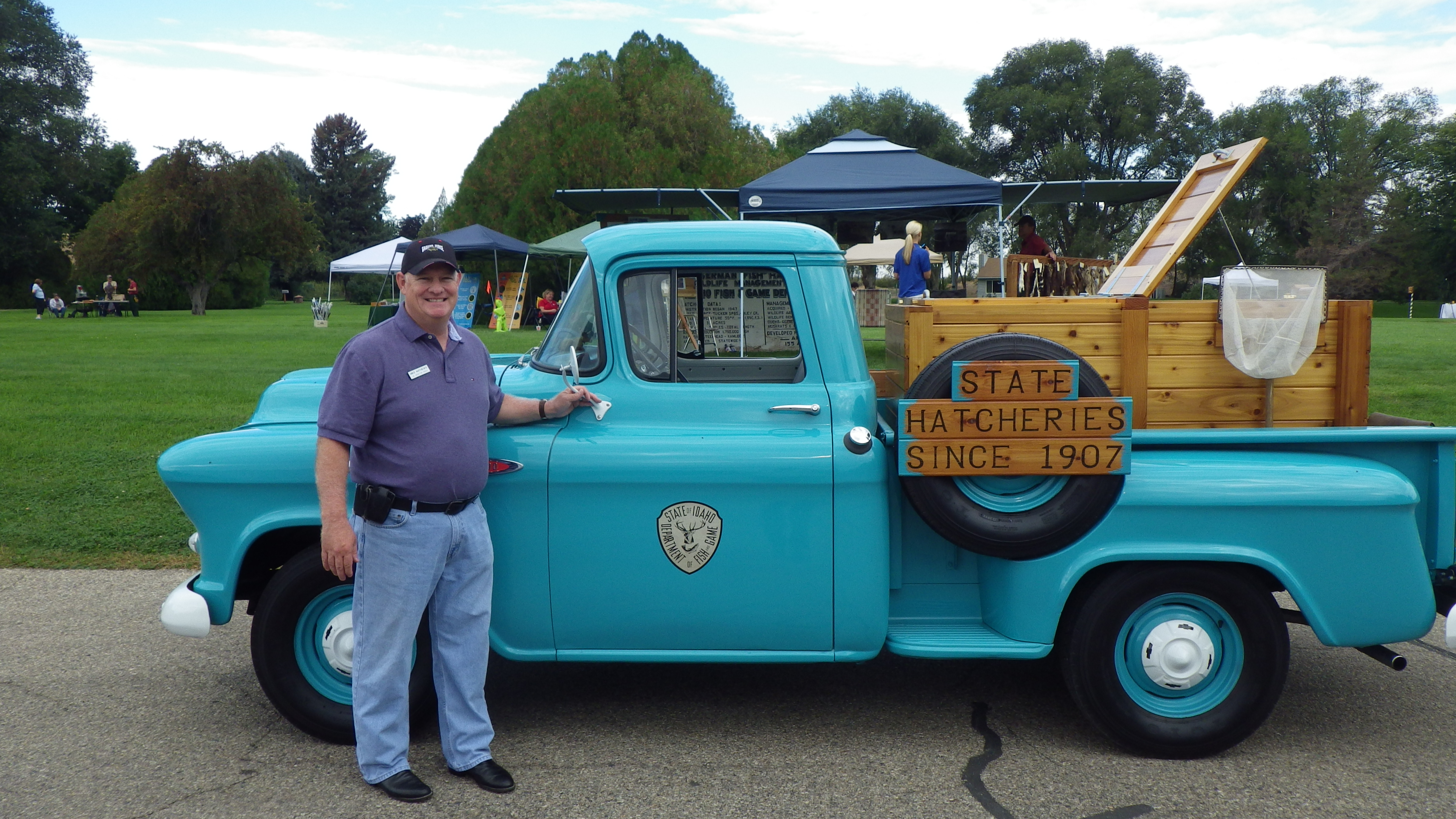
Restored Idaho Fish & Game truck from the 1950s, at a celebration of the 80th anniversary of the Hagerman National Fish Hatchery, 2013

Hagerman is a city in Gooding County, Idaho, United States. The population was 968 at the 2020 census, up from 872 in 2010. The area is noted for its fossil beds and the Thousand Springs of the Eastern Snake River Plain Aquifer. Hagerman is home to a national fish hatchery, a university research station, and extensive aquaculture, assisted by an abundance of geothermal water for temperature regulation.

== Fossil beds ==
Hagerman is the home of the Hagerman Fossil Beds National Monument of the U. S. National Park Service. No other fossil beds preserve such varied land and aquatic species from the Pliocene. More than 180 animal species of both vertebrates and invertebrates and 35 plant species have been found in hundreds of individual fossil sites. Eight species are found nowhere else, and 43 were found here first. The Hagerman horse, Equus simplicidens, exemplifies the quality of the fossils. The Hagerman Horse Quarry fossil beds have produced 20 complete skeletons and a number of partial skeletons of this zebra-like ancestor of today's horse.

== Geography ==
According to the United States Census Bureau, the city has a total area of 0.60 square miles (1.55 km^{2}), of which, 0.58 square miles (1.50 km^{2}) is land and 0.02 square miles (0.05 km^{2}) is water.

=== Climate ===
According to the Köppen Climate Classification system, Hagerman has a cold-semi arid climate, abbreviated "BSk" on climate maps. The hottest temperature recorded in Hagerman was 112 °F (44.4 °C) on July 18, 1998, while the coldest temperature recorded was −25 °F (−31.7 °C) on December 22, 1990.

Climate data for Hagerman, Idaho, 1991–2020 normals, extremes 1982–2018
Month	Jan	Feb	Mar	Apr	May	Jun	Jul	Aug	Sep	Oct	Nov	Dec	Year
Record high °F (°C)	66 (19)	81 (27)	87 (31)	100 (38)	105 (41)	108 (42)	112 (44)	107 (42)	105 (41)	97 (36)	82 (28)	67 (19)	112 (44)
Mean daily maximum °F (°C)	38.1 (3.4)	44.9 (7.2)	55.4 (13.0)	62.4 (16.9)	72.3 (22.4)	81.6 (27.6)	91.9 (33.3)	90.5 (32.5)	80.5 (26.9)	65.9 (18.8)	49.5 (9.7)	37.8 (3.2)	64.2 (17.9)
Daily mean °F (°C)	30.2 (−1.0)	34.7 (1.5)	43.0 (6.1)	48.9 (9.4)	57.9 (14.4)	65.9 (18.8)	73.9 (23.3)	71.7 (22.1)	62.5 (16.9)	50.4 (10.2)	38.4 (3.6)	30.1 (−1.1)	50.6 (10.4)
Mean daily minimum °F (°C)	22.2 (−5.4)	24.5 (−4.2)	30.6 (−0.8)	35.4 (1.9)	43.5 (6.4)	50.1 (10.1)	55.9 (13.3)	52.9 (11.6)	44.4 (6.9)	34.9 (1.6)	27.4 (−2.6)	22.4 (−5.3)	37.0 (2.8)
Record low °F (°C)	−18 (−28)	−12 (−24)	7 (−14)	17 (−8)	25 (−4)	30 (−1)	38 (3)	32 (0)	24 (−4)	10 (−12)	−9 (−23)	−25 (−32)	−25 (−32)
Average precipitation inches (mm)	1.32 (34)	0.86 (22)	1.03 (26)	0.83 (21)	1.03 (26)	0.57 (14)	0.15 (3.8)	0.18 (4.6)	0.42 (11)	0.73 (19)	1.11 (28)	1.58 (40)	9.81 (249.4)
Average precipitation days (≥ 0.01 in)	8.4	6.8	7.0	6.7	6.9	4.4	2.0	1.5	2.9	4.4	7.0	9.0	67.0
Source 1: NOAA
Source 2: National Weather Service

== Demographics ==
Historical population
Census	Pop.	Note	%±
1920	327		—
1930	327		0.0%
1940	435		33.0%
1950	520		19.5%
1960	430		−17.3%
1970	436		1.4%
1980	602		38.1%
1990	600		−0.3%
2000	656		9.3%
2010	872		32.9%
2020	968		11.0%
U.S. Decennial Census

=== 2010 census ===
As of the census of 2010, there were 872 people, 380 households, and 231 families living in the city. The population density was 1,503.4 inhabitants per square mile (580.5/km^{2}). There were 452 housing units at an average density of 779.3 units per square mile (300.9 units/km^{2}). The racial makeup of the city was 93.8% White, 0.1% African American, 0.7% Native American, 0.3% Asian, 3.4% from other races, and 1.6% from two or more races. Hispanic or Latino of any race were 13.8% of the population.

There were 380 households, of which 26.8% had children under the age of 18 living with them, 45.0% were married couples living together, 10.3% had a female householder with no husband present, 5.5% had a male householder with no wife present, and 39.2% were non-families. 33.9% of all households were made up of individuals, and 19.7% had someone living alone who was 65 years of age or older. The average household size was 2.29 and the average family size was 2.88.

The median age in the city was 46.1 years. 24.4% of residents were under the age of 18; 5.9% were between the ages of 18 and 24; 18.9% were from 25 to 44; 25.3% were from 45 to 64; and 25.2% were 65 years of age or older. The gender makeup of the city was 48.3% male and 51.7% female.

=== 2000 census ===
As of the census of 2000, there were 656 people, 277 households, and 178 families living in the city. The population density was 1,978.9 inhabitants per square mile (764.1/km^{2}). There were 324 housing units at an average density of 977.4 units per square mile (377.4 units/km^{2}). The racial makeup of the city was 93.29% White, 0.61% Native American, 0.46% Pacific Islander, 3.05% from other races, and 2.59% from two or more races. Hispanic or Latino of any race were 8.84% of the population.

There were 277 households, out of which 23.8% had children under the age of 18 living with them, 50.9% were married couples living together, 9.0% had a female householder with no husband present, and 35.7% were non-families. 29.6% of all households were made up of individuals, and 15.9% had someone living alone who was 65 years of age or older. The average household size was 2.37 and the average family size was 2.93.

In the city, the population was spread out, with 23.9% under the age of 18, 7.3% from 18 to 24, 22.1% from 25 to 44, 23.0% from 45 to 64, and 23.6% who were 65 years of age or older. The median age was 42 years. For every 100 females, there were 95.8 males. For every 100 females age 18 and over, there were 87.6 males.

The median income for a household in the city was $25,455, and the median income for a family was $29,886. Males had a median income of $23,750 versus $20,938 for females. The per capita income for the city was $13,182. About 17.1% of families and 14.4% of the population were below the poverty line, including 11.3% of those under age 18 and 13.7% of those age 65 or over.

== Education ==
Hagerman is in the Hagerman Joint School District 233.

Gooding County is in the catchment area, but not the taxation zone, for College of Southern Idaho.
