= Camas Creek (Big Wood River tributary) =

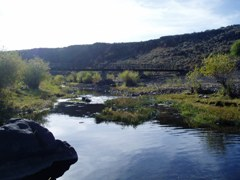
- The Camas Creek, east of Fairfield, Idaho, October 2010

- Location of the mouth of Camas Creek in Idaho Camas Creek (Big Wood River tributary) (the United States)

Location
- Country: United States
- State: Idaho
- Counties: Camas County, Idaho, Elmore County, Idaho, Blaine County, Idaho

Physical characteristics
- Source
  - location: west of Hill City, Elmore County, Idaho
  - coordinates: 43°15′28″N 115°20′57″W
  - elevation: 5,807 ft (1,770 m)
- Mouth: Big Wood River
  - location: Magic Reservoir, Camas/Blaine counties, Idaho
  - coordinates: 43°19′36″N 114°24′06″W
  - elevation: 4,800 ft (1,500 m)
- Length: 64 mi (103 km)
- Basin size: 698 sq mi (1,810 km^{2})

Camas Creek is a 64-mile (103 km) long river in southern Idaho, United States, that is a tributary of the Big Wood River. (Note: One of the tributaries of this Camas Creek (not to be confused with at least four other Camas Creeks in Idaho) is located entirely within Elmore County and is called the Malad River. What makes that interesting is that the Camas Creek empties into the Big Wood River, which in turn, empties into the Malad River (which is located entirely within Gooding County), thus making the Malad River (of Elmore County) and tributary of the Malad River (of Gooding County). Of course, neither of these two Malad Rivers is the Malad River which flows south from southeastern Idaho to northern Utah and into the Bear River (a tributary of the Great Salt Lake).)

== Description ==
Beginning at an elevation of 5,807 feet (1,770 m) west of Hill City in eastern Elmore County, it flows east into Camas County, where it is roughly paralleled by U.S. Route 20. About 10 miles (16 km) east of Fairfield, it forms the Camas–Blaine county line and continues east to its mouth at Magic Reservoir, at an elevation of 4,800 feet (1,463 m). Camas Creek has a 698-square-mile (1,810 km^{2}) watershed.

== See also ==
- List of rivers of Idaho
- List of longest streams of Idaho
