= Bellevue Historic District (Columbia, South Carolina) =

Historic district in South Carolina, United States

- Bellevue-Newman's Field-Gracelynn Terrace Historic District
- U.S. National Register of Historic Places
- U.S. Historic district
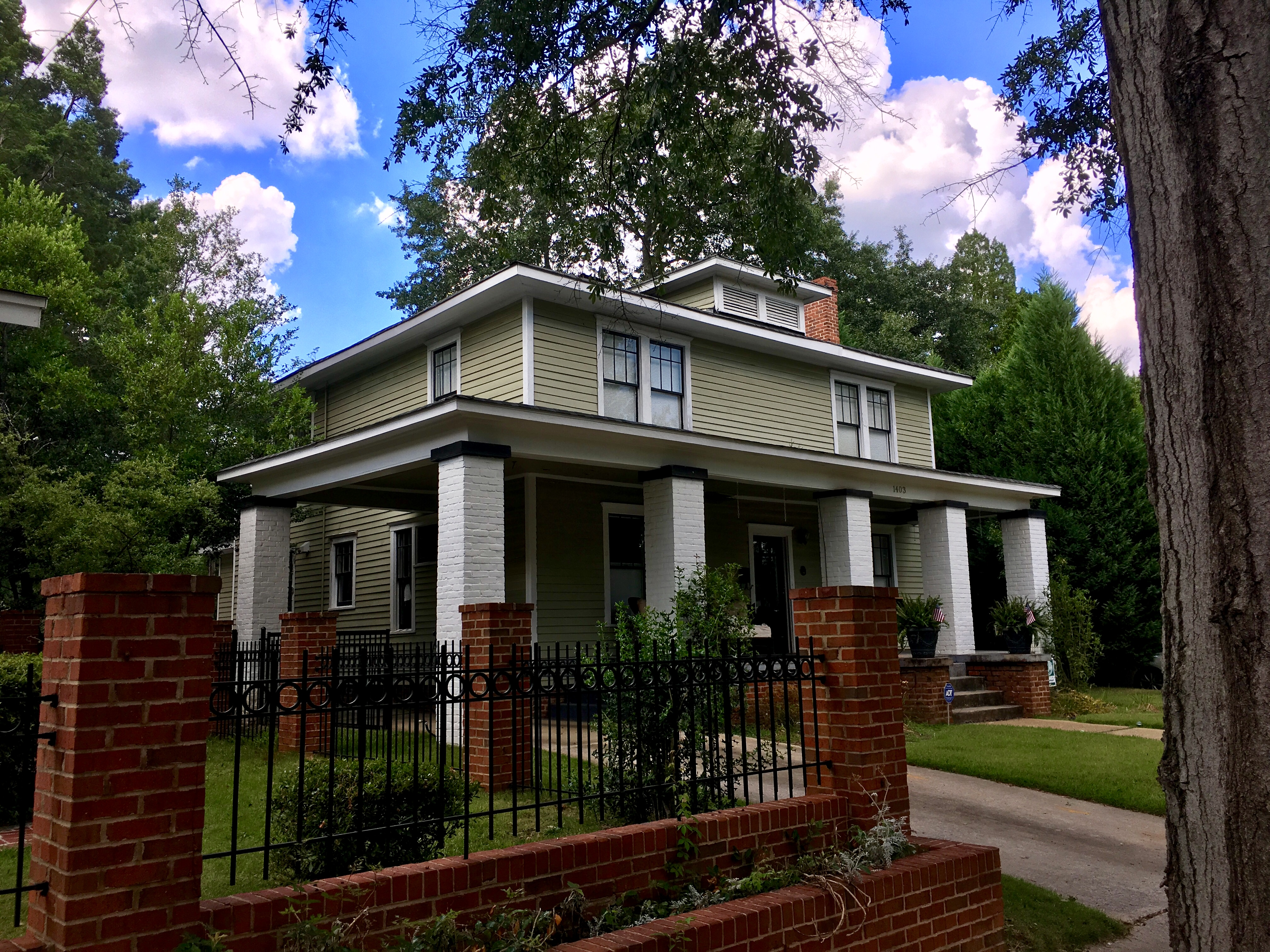

- Location within South Carolina Location within the United States
- Location: Roughly bounded by Sumter St., Anthony Ave., Bull St., Elmwood Ave., and Grace St., Columbia, South Carolina
- Coordinates: 34°01′09″N 81°02′19″W
- Area: 43 acres (17 ha)
- Built: 1913
- Architectural style: Late 19th And 20th Century Revivals, Late 19th And Early 20th Century American Movements
- NRHP reference No.: 97001206 (original); 100011282 (increase)

Significant dates
- Added to NRHP: September 30, 1997
- Boundary increase: January 3, 2025

Bellevue-Newman's Field-Gracelynn Terrace Historic District, previously the Bellevue Historic District, also known as Cottontown, is a national historic district located at Columbia, South Carolina. The district encompasses 177 contributing buildings in a planned suburban residential development. They were built between the early 20th century and 1945, and the district includes examples of Tudor Revival, Colonial Revival, and Craftsman/Bungalow style architecture.

It was added to the National Register of Historic Places in 1997. In 2025, the district was enlarged and renamed.
