= Big Wood River =

River in Idaho, United States

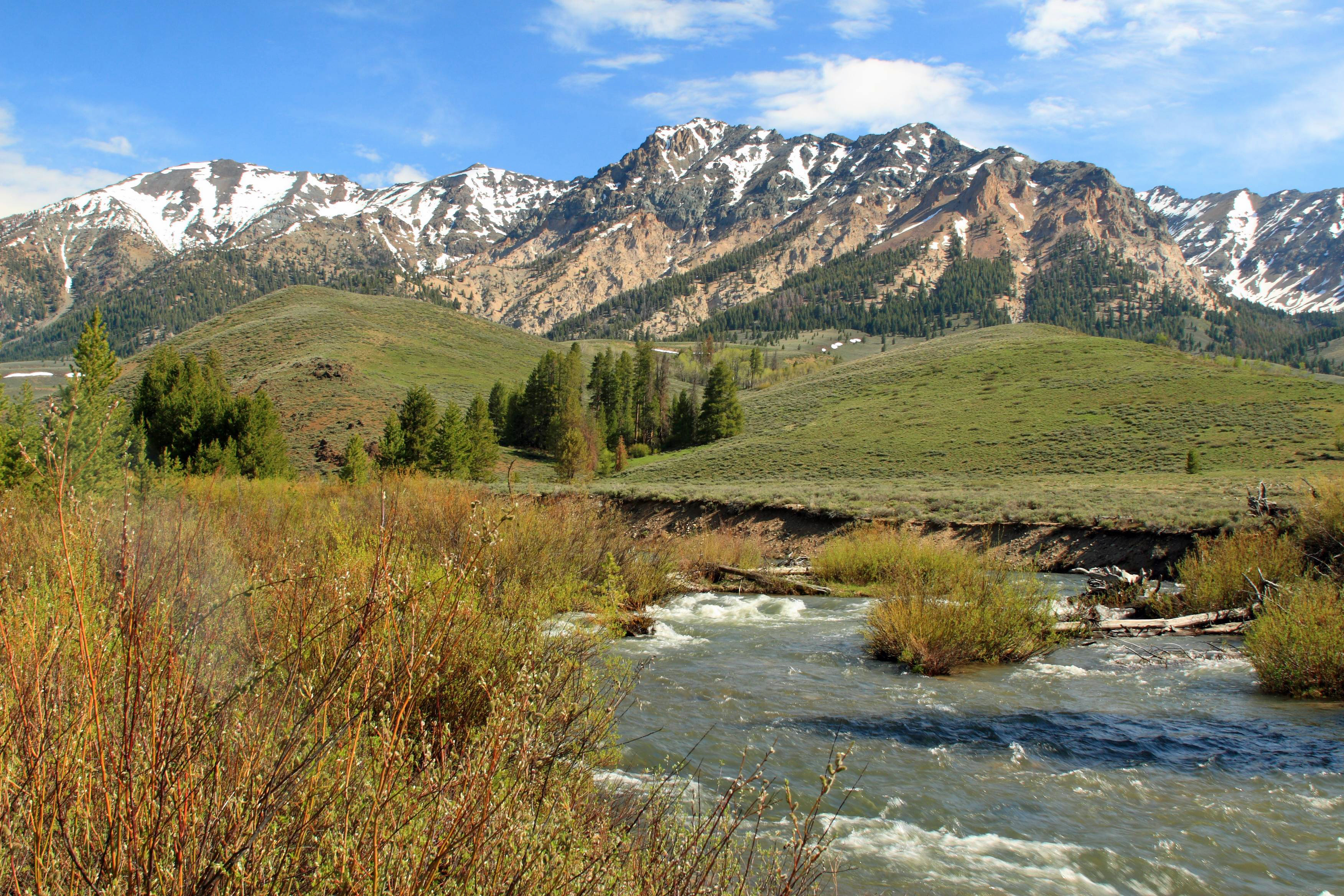
- Big Wood River and Boulder Mountains, July 2009

- Location in the United States Location in Idaho

Location
- Country: United States
- State: Idaho
- Region: Blaine, Lincoln, and Gooding counties
- Cities: Sun Valley, Ketchum

Physical characteristics
- Source: Sawtooth Range
  - location: Galena Summit, Blaine County
  - coordinates: 43°51′38″N 114°42′48″W
  - elevation: 9,100 ft (2,770 m)
- Mouth: Malad River
  - location: Gooding County
  - coordinates: 42°56′42″N 114°47′44″W
  - elevation: 3,460 ft (1,050 m)
- Length: 137 mi (220 km)
- Discharge
  - location: below Magic Reservoir
  - average: 464 cu ft/s (13.1 m^{3}/s)
  - minimum: 0 cu ft/s (0 m^{3}/s)
  - maximum: 9,800 cu ft/s (280 m^{3}/s)

Basin features
- Tributaries
  - left: North Fork Big Wood River, East Fork Wood River
  - right: Camas Creek (Big Wood River)

The Big Wood River is a 137-mile-long (220 km) river in central Idaho, United States, that is a tributary of the Malad River (which in turn is a tributary to the Snake River and Columbia River).

== Course ==
From its source in the Boulder Mountains near Galena Summit in the Sawtooth National Recreation Area, the Big Wood River generally flows south between the Boulder Mountains to the north, Pioneer Mountains to the east, and the Smoky Mountains to the west. Highway 75 accompanies the river southward from Galena Summit, to an area north of Shoshone. Here, it carved Black Magic Canyon.

The river flows by Sun Valley and Ketchum, where it receives the tributary streams of Warm Springs Creek and Trail Creek. Below Ketchum, it is joined by the East Fork Wood River at Gimlet before passing by the seat of Blaine County, Hailey. Continuing south, the river leaves the Wood River Valley south of Bellevue and enters the northern part of Magic Valley, after which it flows into Magic Reservoir. A tributary stream, Camas Creek, (Note: One of the tributaries of the Big Wood River is the Camas Creek (not to be confused with at least four other Camas Creeks in Idaho). One of the tributaries of that Camas Creek is called the Malad River. What makes that interesting is that the Big Wood River empties into the Malad River, thus making the Malad River and tributary of the Malad River.) joins the river in Magic Reservoir.

Below Magic Dam, the Big Wood River enters Lincoln County, passing by many lava beds and irrigation canals before entering Gooding County. Just west of Gooding, the Big Wood River joins the Little Wood River to form the Malad River.

Big Wood River's water flow is affected by numerous irrigation reservoirs and canals on the river itself and its tributaries.

Variant names of the Big Wood River, according to the USGS, include Malad River, Malade River, Wood River, Poisonous Beaver River, and Sickley River.

== See also ==
- List of Idaho rivers
- List of longest streams of Idaho
