= Little Wood River (Idaho) =

Little Wood River McArthurs River & Wood River
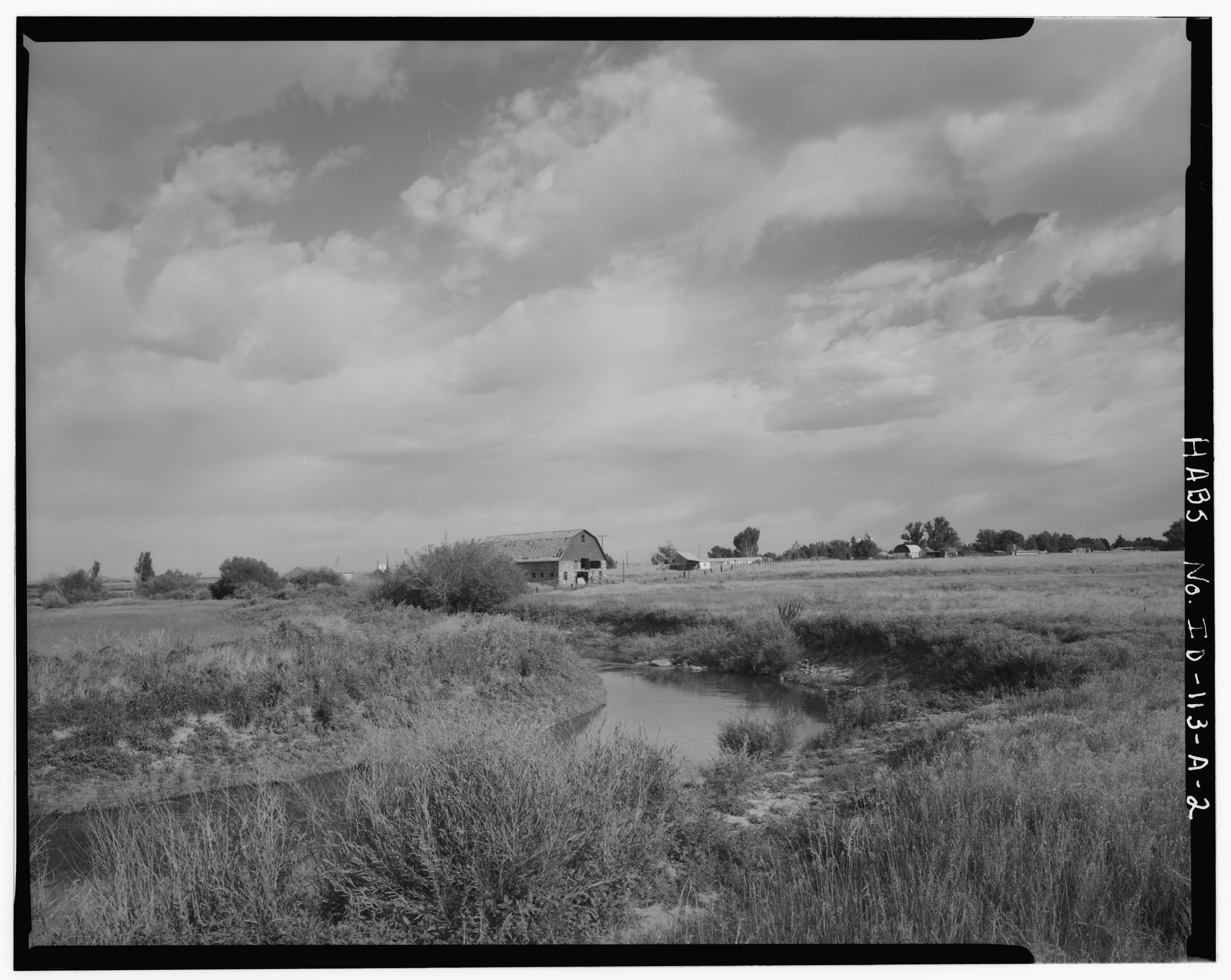
- Little Wood River, south of Richfield

- Location of the mouth of the Little Wood River in Idaho Little Wood River (Idaho) (the United States)

Location
- Country: United States
- State: Idaho
- Region: Blaine County, Lincoln County, Gooding County

Physical characteristics
- Source: Pioneer Mountains
  - location: Blaine County
  - coordinates: 43°45′41″N 114°0′13″W
  - elevation: 9,832 ft (2,997 m)
- Mouth: Malad River
  - location: Gooding County
  - coordinates: 42°56′42″N 114°47′46″W
  - elevation: 3,460 ft (1,050 m)
- Length: 130 mi (210 km)
- Discharge
  - location: below Little Wood Reservoir
  - average: 351 cu ft/s (9.9 m^{3}/s)
  - minimum: 0.34 cu ft/s (0.0096 m^{3}/s)
  - maximum: 2,900 cu ft/s (82 m^{3}/s)

Little Wood River is a 130-mile-long (210 km) river in south-central Idaho in the United States. It is a tributary of the Malad River, which in turn is a tributary to the Snake River and Columbia River.

== Description ==
The Little Wood River originates in the Pioneer Mountains of northern Blaine County, then flows south through Little Wood Reservoir near Carey. Below the reservoir the river flows south into Lincoln County, past Richfield, and then west, past Shoshone, after which it enters Gooding County. Just west of Gooding, the Little Wood River joins the Big Wood River to form the Malad River.

Its tributaries include Baugh Creek.

The Little Wood River is the key source of irrigation water for eastern Blaine County and most of Lincoln County. Its water was a major attraction for the region's first permanent settlement at Carey. The river's water flow is regulated by reservoirs and affected by diversions of water into irrigation canals.

Variant names of the Little Wood River, according to the USGS, include McArthurs River and Wood River.

== See also ==
- List of rivers of Idaho
- List of longest streams of Idaho
