= Lost Lake =

Lost Lake may refer to:

== Communities ==
United States

- Lost Lake, Mississippi, unincorporated community
- Lost Lake, Wisconsin, unincorporated community

== Lakes ==
=== Canada ===
==== British Columbia ====
- Lost Lake (Mackenzie) near Mackenzie, British Columbia
- Lost Lake (Whistler)

=== United States ===
==== Alaska ====
- Lost Lake Scout Camp

==== Arkansas ====
- Lost Lake, a lake in Clay County, Arkansas

==== California ====
- Lost Lake (El Dorado County, California) in the Desolation Wilderness area
- Lost Lake (San Bernardino County, California)

==== Massachusetts ====
- Lost Lake (Groton)

==== Michigan ====
- Lost Lake (Clare County, Michigan)
- Lost Lake Scout Reservation

==== Minnesota ====
- Lost Lake (Minnesota)

==== Montana ====
- Lost Lake (Carbon County, Montana) in Carbon County, Montana
- Lost Lake (Chouteau County, Montana) in Chouteau County, Montana
- Lost Lake (Flathead County, Montana) in Flathead County, Montana
- Lost Lake (Lake County, Montana) in Lake County, Montana
- Lost Lake (Lincoln County, Montata) in Lincoln County, Montana
- Lost Lake (Mineral County, Montana) in Mineral County, Montana
- Lost Lake (Missoula County, Montana) in Missoula County, Montana
- Lost Lake (Sweet Grass County, Montana) in Sweet Grass County, Montana
- Lost Lake (Stillwater County, Montana) in Stillwater County, Montana

==== Oregon ====
- Lost Lake (Oregon), several lakes, including:
  - Lost Lake (Hood River County, Oregon)
  - Lost Lake (Santiam Pass, Linn County, Oregon)

==== South Dakota ====
- Lost Lake (South Dakota), in Minnehaha County

==== Washington ====
- Lost Lake (Whatcom County), in Whatcom County
- Lost Lake (Lewis County), in Lewis County

==== Wisconsin ====
- Lost Lake (Vilas County)
- Lost Lake (Door County) in Jacksonport, Wisconsin
- Lost Lake (Sherman) in Sherman, Iron County, Wisconsin
  - Lost Lake (Mercer) in Mercer, Wisconsin
- Lost Lake (Burnett County)
  - Lost Lake (Jackson) in Jackson, Burnett County, Wisconsin
  - Lost Lake (Webb Lake) in Webb Lake, Wisconsin
  - Lost Lake (Rusk) in Rusk, Burnett County, Wisconsin

== See also ==
- Long Lost Lake in Clearwater County, Minnesota
- Little Lost Lake by Avery, Idaho
- Lost Land Lake in Sawyer County, Wisconsin
- Big Lost Lake in Beltrami County
- East Lost Lake in Otter Tail County, Minnesota
- West Lost Lake in Otter Tail County, Minnesota
