= Carbonate Mountain =

Carbonate Mountain may refer to:

- Carbonate Mountain (Colorado) in Colorado, USA
- Carbonate Mountain (Idaho) in Idaho, USA
- Carbonate Mountain (Montana) in Montana, USA
