= Penny Lake =

Penny Lake may refer to:

- Penny Lake (Antarctica)
- Penny Lake (Blaine County, Idaho)
- Penny Lake (Portage County, Wisconsin)
