= Lower Titus Peak =

Mountain in Idaho, United States

- Location within Idaho

Highest point
- Elevation: 10,005 ft (3,050 m)
- Prominence: 225 ft (69 m)
- Coordinates: 43°50′38″N 114°43′03″W

Geography
- Location: Blaine County, Idaho, U.S.
- Parent range: Smoky Mountains

Lower Titus Peak, at 10,005 feet (3,050 m) above sea level is a peak in the Smoky Mountains of Idaho. The peak is located in Sawtooth National Recreation Area in Blaine County. It is located about 0.6 mi (0.97 km) northwest of Titus Peak and 1 mi (1.6 km) of Saviers Peak. No roads or trails go to the summit.
