= Bear Peak =

Bear Peak may refer to:

== United States ==
- Bear Peak (Lake County, California)
- Bear Peak (Siskiyou County, California)
- Bear Peak (Boulder County, Colorado)
- Bear Peak (Custer County, Colorado)
- Bear Peak (Blaine County, Idaho)
- Bear Peak (Montana), a mountain in Flathead County, Montana
- Bear Peak, a mountain peak that is part of the Mountain Creek ski resort in Sussex County, New Jersey
- Bear Peak, a mountain peak that is part of the Attitash Mountain Resort in Bartlett, New Hampshire
- Bear Peak, in the San Augustin Mountains of New Mexico
- Bear Peak (Wyoming)

== Other places ==
- Bear Peak (Greenland), in the Stauning Alps

== See also ==
- Little Bear Peak, Chouteau County, Montana
- Polar Bear Peak, Alaska
- Bear Mountain (disambiguation)
