= Prairie Creek Peak =

Mountain in the state of Idaho

- Location within Idaho

Highest point
- Elevation: 10,138 ft (3,090 m)
- Prominence: 558 ft (170 m)
- Parent peak: Norton Peak
- Coordinates: 43°44′38″N 114°40′09″W

Geography
- Location: Blaine and Camas counties, Idaho, U.S.
- Parent range: Smoky Mountains
- Topo map: USGS Baker Peak

Climbing
- Easiest route: Simple scramble, class 2

Prairie Creek Peak, at 10,138 feet (3,090 m) above sea level is the sixth highest peak in the Smoky Mountains of Idaho. The peak is located on the border of both Sawtooth National Forest and Sawtooth National Recreation Area and Blaine and Camas counties. It is located about 1.5 mi (2.4 km) southwest of Norton Peak, west of Big Lost Lake, southeast of the Prairie Lakes, and northwest of Smoky and Little Lost lakes. No roads or trails go to the summit.
