= Mill Lake (Idaho) =

Lake in Idaho, United States

- Location within Idaho Location within the United States
- Location: Blaine County, Idaho
- Coordinates: 43°46′45″N 114°38′23″W
- Type: Glacial
- Primary inflows: Mill Creek
- Primary outflows: Mill Creek to Prairie Creek to Big Wood River
- Basin countries: United States
- Max. length: 1,050 ft (320 m)
- Max. width: 840 ft (260 m)
- Surface elevation: 8,230 ft (2,510 m)

Mill Lake is an alpine lake in Blaine County, Idaho, United States, located in the Smoky Mountains in Sawtooth National Recreation Area of Sawtooth National Forest. The lake is most easily accessed via trail 136 from the end of forest road 179. The lake is located north of Norton Peak.
