= Skillern Peak =

Mountain in Idaho, United States

- Location within Idaho

Highest point
- Elevation: 8,878 ft (2,706 m)
- Prominence: 374 ft (114 m)
- Parent peak: Paradise Peak
- Coordinates: 43°41′15″N 114°48′57″W

Geography
- Location: Camas County, Idaho, U.S.
- Parent range: Smoky Mountains
- Topo map: USGS Paradise Peak

Skillern Peak, at 8,878 feet (2,706 m) above sea level is a peak in the Smoky Mountains of Idaho. The peak is located in Sawtooth National Forest in Camas County. It is located in the watershed of Big Smoky Creek, a tributary of the South Fork of the Boise River. It is about 4.5 mi (7.2 km) northwest of Big Peak and 3.9 mi (6.3 km) southeast of Paradise Peak. No roads or trails go to the summit, although a trail is on the side of the mountain.
