= Smoky Mountains (Idaho) =

Mountain range in the state of Idaho

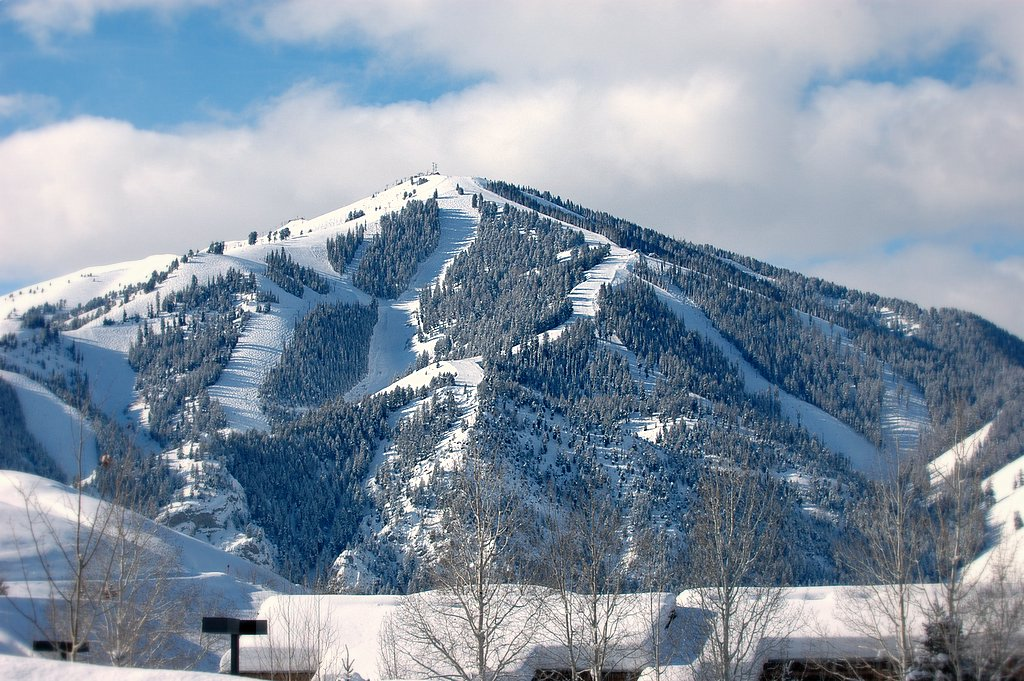
- Bald Mountain in the Smoky Mountains

Highest point
- Peak: Saviers Peak
- Elevation: 10,441 ft (3,182 m)
- Coordinates: 43°49′19″N 114°42′47″W

Dimensions
- Length: 45 mi (72 km) N/S
- Width: 39 mi (63 km) E/W
- Area: 877 mi^{2} (2,270 km^{2})

Geography
- Country: United States
- State: Idaho
- Parent range: Rocky Mountains

The Smoky Mountains are part of the Rocky Mountains and located on the west side of the Wood River Valley near Sun Valley, Idaho, in the Western United States. The range is within Sawtooth National Forest, while part of it is within the Sawtooth National Recreation Area. The highest point in the range is Saviers Peak at 10,441 ft (3,182 m).

The Smoky Mountains area is closely surrounded by other mountain ranges including the Sawtooth Mountains to the northwest, Boulder Mountains to the north, Pioneer Mountains to the east, and Soldier Mountains to the south. The Smoky Mountains are located within the watersheds of the Big Wood, Salmon, and Boise Rivers. The mountains are most easily accessed from Idaho State Highway 75, although many unimproved and improved dirt roads, including National Forest road 227, enter and cross the mountains.

The Smoky Mountains were named from the frequent forest fires in the mountains. In 2007 the Castle Rock Fire burned 48,000 acres (19,000 ha) of the Smoky Mountains near Ketchum.

== Peaks ==
Peaks of the Smoky Mountains
Mountain Peak	Elevation	Prominence	Isolation	Location
Saviers Peak	10,440 ft 3182 m	1,759 ft 536 m	6.86 mi 11.04 km	43.822013°N 114.713114°W
Camas County Highpoint	10,338 ft 3151 m	240 ft 73 m	0.59 mi 0.95 km	43.814796°N 114.719438°W
Norton Peak	10,335 ft 3150 m	1,253 ft 382 m	4.92 mi 7.91 km	43.762049°N 114.653375°W
Bromaghin Peak	10,226 ft 3117 m	187 ft 57 m	0.63 mi 1.01 km	43.830098°N 114.718877°W
Baker Peak	10,174 ft 3101 m	1,074 ft 327 m	6.5 mi 10.46 km	43.66990°N 114.67980°W
Prairie Creek Peak	10,138 ft 3090 m	259 ft 79 m	0.84 mi 1.35 km	43.74390°N 114.67000°W
Titus Peak	10,112 ft 3082 m	250 ft 76 m	1 mi 1.61 km	43.83630°N 114.71130°W
Backdrop Peak	10,098 ft 3078 m	639 ft 195 m	1.36 mi 2.19 km	43.68930°N 114.68570°W
Big Peak	10,013 ft 3052 m	987 ft 301 m	2.45 mi 3.94 km	43.66873°N 114.72870°W
Lower Titus Peak	10,007 ft 3050 m	225 ft 69 m	1.54 mi 2.48 km	43.84400°N 114.71760°W
Paradise Peak	9,797 ft 2986 m	817 ft 249 m	5.53 mi 8.9 km	43.738513°N 114.849235°W
Bear Peak	9,524 ft 2903 m	505 ft 154 m	1.38 mi 2.22 km	43.67560°N 114.58860°W
Dollarhide Mountain	9,301 ft 2835 m	481 ft 147 m	1.11 mi 1.79 km	43.60910°N 114.68170°W
Bald Mountain	9,150 ft 2789 m	1,533 ft 467 m	6.72 mi 10.81 km	43.65500°N 114.40830°W
Buttercup Mountain	9,078 ft 2767 m	580 ft 177 m	2.42 mi 3.89 km	43.51600°N 114.57600°W
Skillern Peak	8,878 ft 2706 m	374 ft 114 m	1.37 mi 2.2 km	43.687402°N 114.815900°W
Kelly Mountain	8,825 ft 2690 m	1,446 ft 441 m	5.77 mi 9.29 km	43.49300°N 114.46600°W
Griffin Butte	8,412 ft 2564 m	871 ft 265 m	3.22 mi 5.18 km	43.73000°N 114.41900°W
Mahoney Butte	7,904 ft 2409 m	484 ft 148 m	1.77 mi 2.85 km	43.59700°N 114.45300°W
Carbonate Mountain	6,713 ft 2046 m	294 ft 90 m	1.21 mi 1.95 km	43.31000°N 114.20000°W

== Lakes ==
Named lakes of the Smoky Mountains
Lake	Elevation	Max. length	Max. width	Location	Primary Outflow
Baker Lake	2,685 m (8,809 ft)	280 m (920 ft)	150 m (490 ft)	43.690651°N 114.675674°W	Baker Creek
Big Lost Lake	2,797 m (9,177 ft)	295 m (968 ft)	210 m (690 ft)	43.743924°N 114.662344°W	Norton Creek
Dollar Lake	1,815 m (5,955 ft)	053 m (174 ft)	046 m (151 ft)	43.688218°N 114.418695°W	Warm Springs Creek
Little Lost Lake	2,768 m (9,081 ft)	075 m (246 ft)	028 m (92 ft)	43.736715°N 114.660383°W	Norton Creek
Lower Norton Lake	2,737 m (8,980 ft)	190 m (620 ft)	106 m (348 ft)	43.748834°N 114.654185°W	Norton Creek
Mill Lake	2,510 m (8,230 ft)	320 m (1,050 ft)	257 m (843 ft)	43.779064°N 114.639653°W	Mill Creek
Miner Lake	2,678 m (8,786 ft)	390 m (1,280 ft)	240 m (790 ft)	43.759270°N 114.665195°W	Prairie Creek
Paradise Lake	2,741 m (8,993 ft)	177 m (581 ft)	084 m (276 ft)	43.733329°N 114.846167°W	Paradise Creek
Penny Lake	1,810 m (5,940 ft)	072 m (236 ft)	041 m (135 ft)	43.686078°N 114.418867°W	Warm Springs Creek
Smoky Lake	2,755 m (9,039 ft)	100 m (330 ft)	095 m (312 ft)	43.739392°N 114.659457°W	Norton Creek
Snowslide Lake	2,670 m (8,760 ft)	102 m (335 ft)	060 m (200 ft)	43.738611°N 114.825412°W	Snowslide Creek
Titus Lake	2,719 m (8,921 ft)	105 m (344 ft)	093 m (305 ft)	43.855021°N 114.710435°W	Titus Creek
Upper Norton Lake	2,780 m (9,120 ft)	279 m (915 ft)	106 m (348 ft)	43.751912°N 114.656145°W	Norton Creek

== Gallery ==
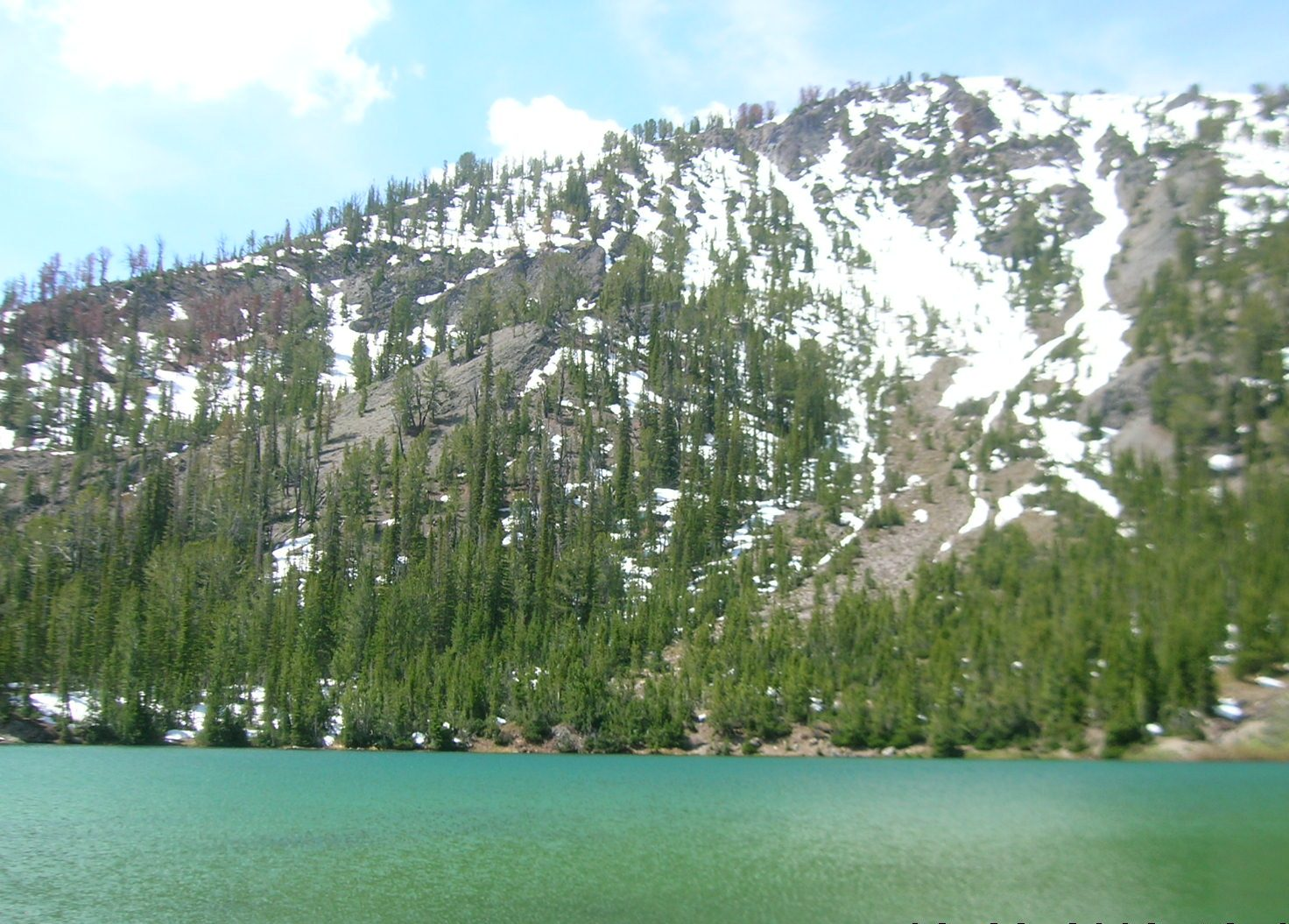
Titus Lake in the Smoky Mountains

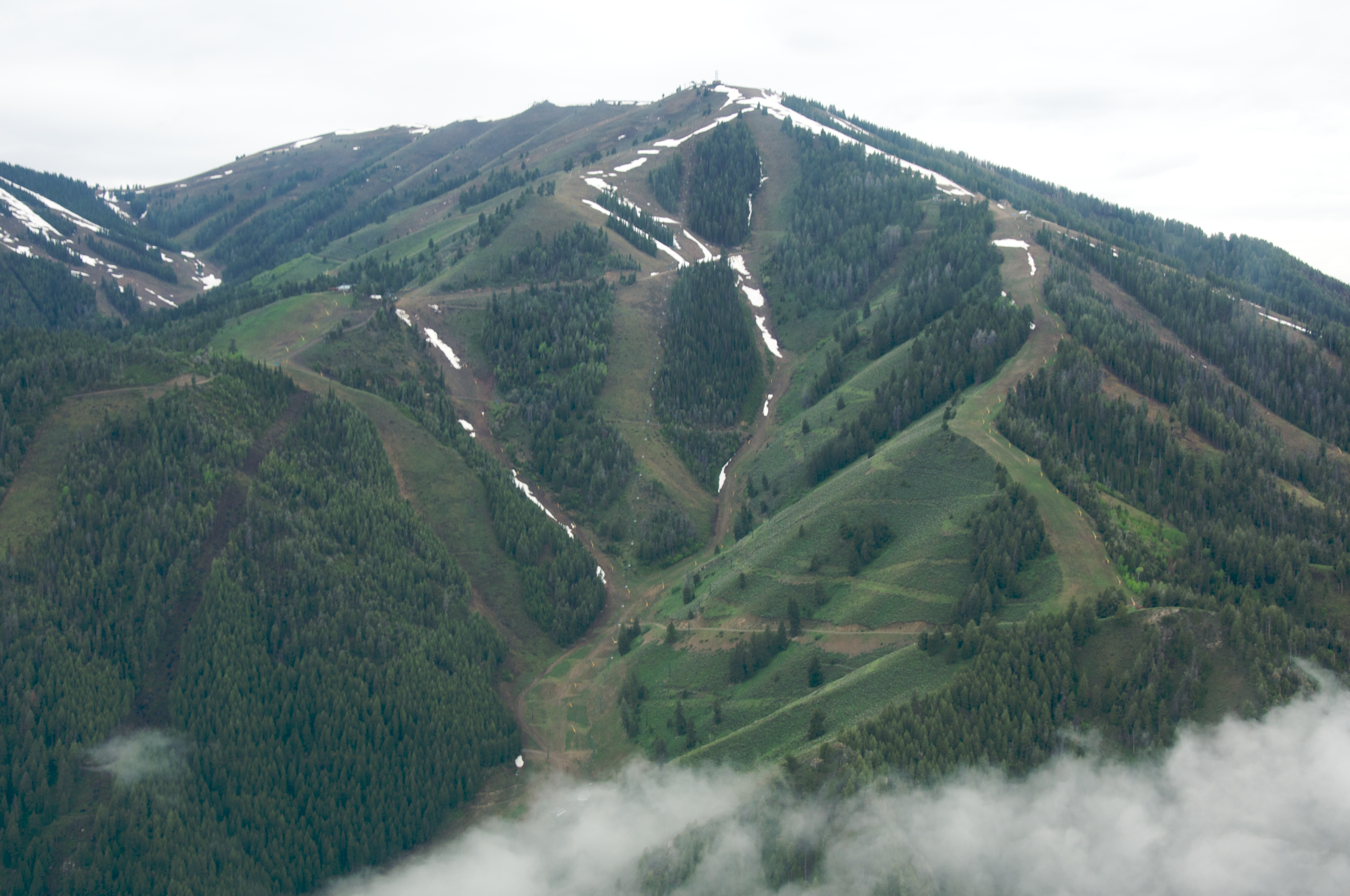
Bald Mountain

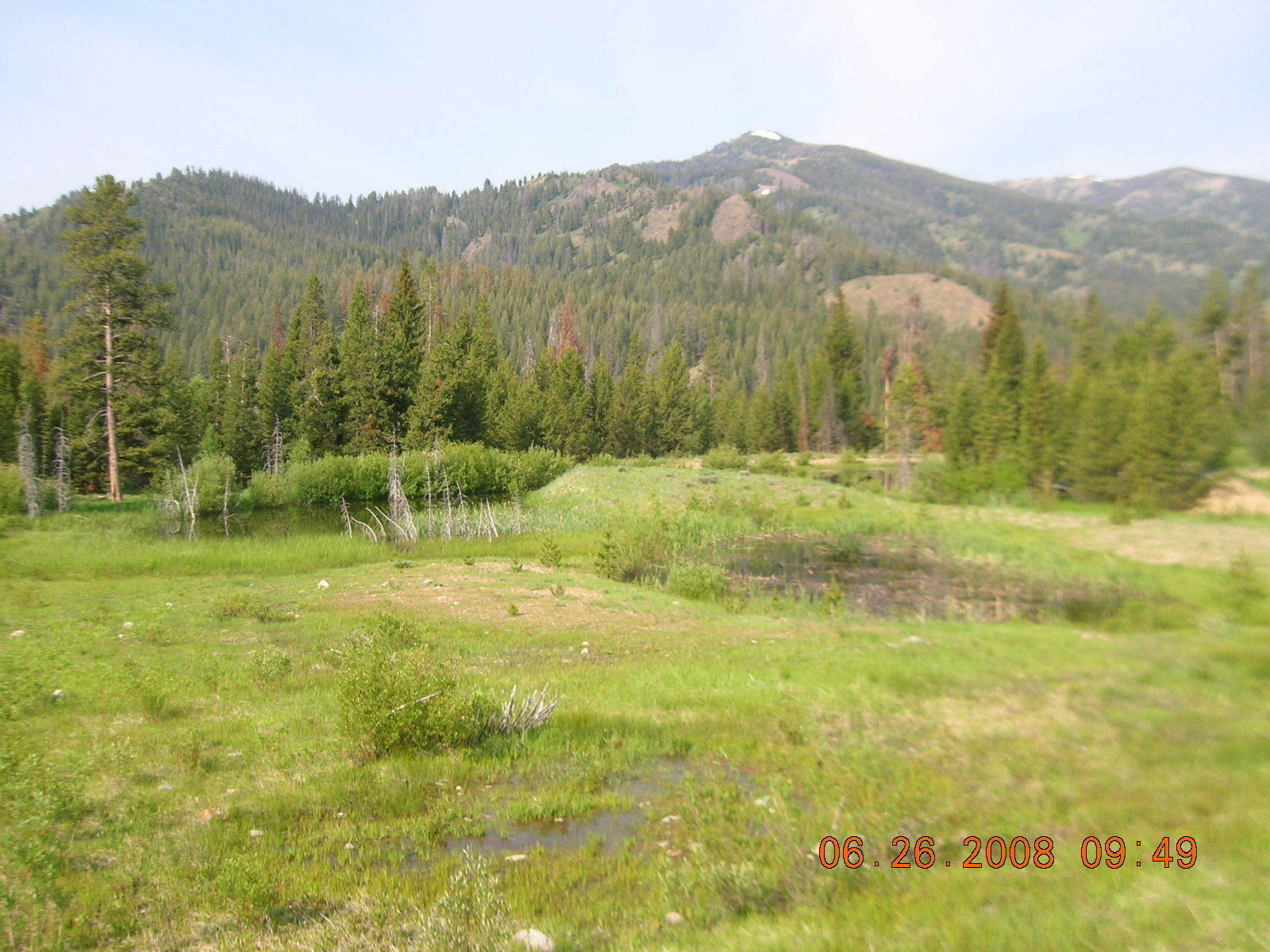
Smoky Mountains from Wood River Valley

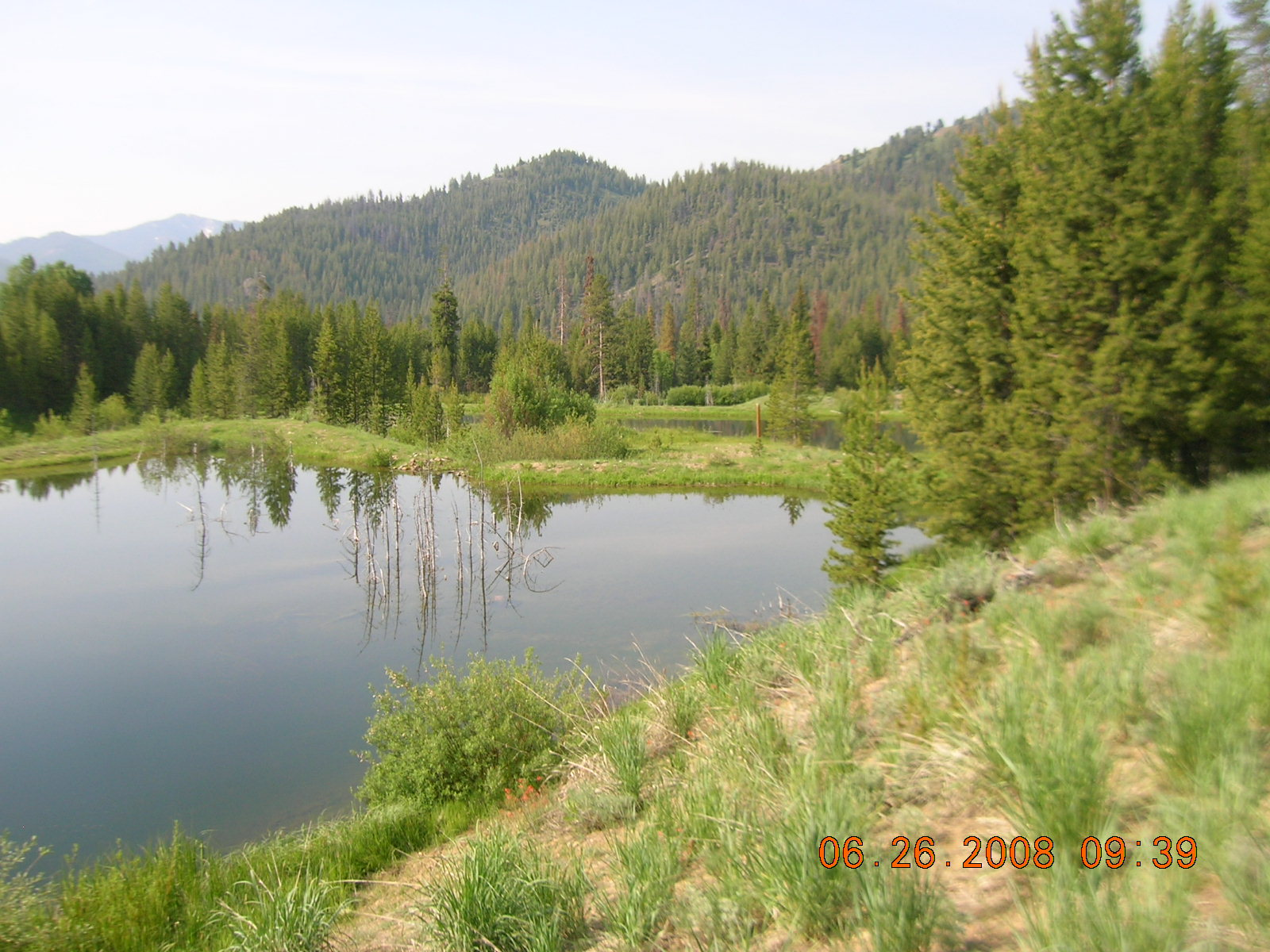
Smoky Mountains from Wood River Valley

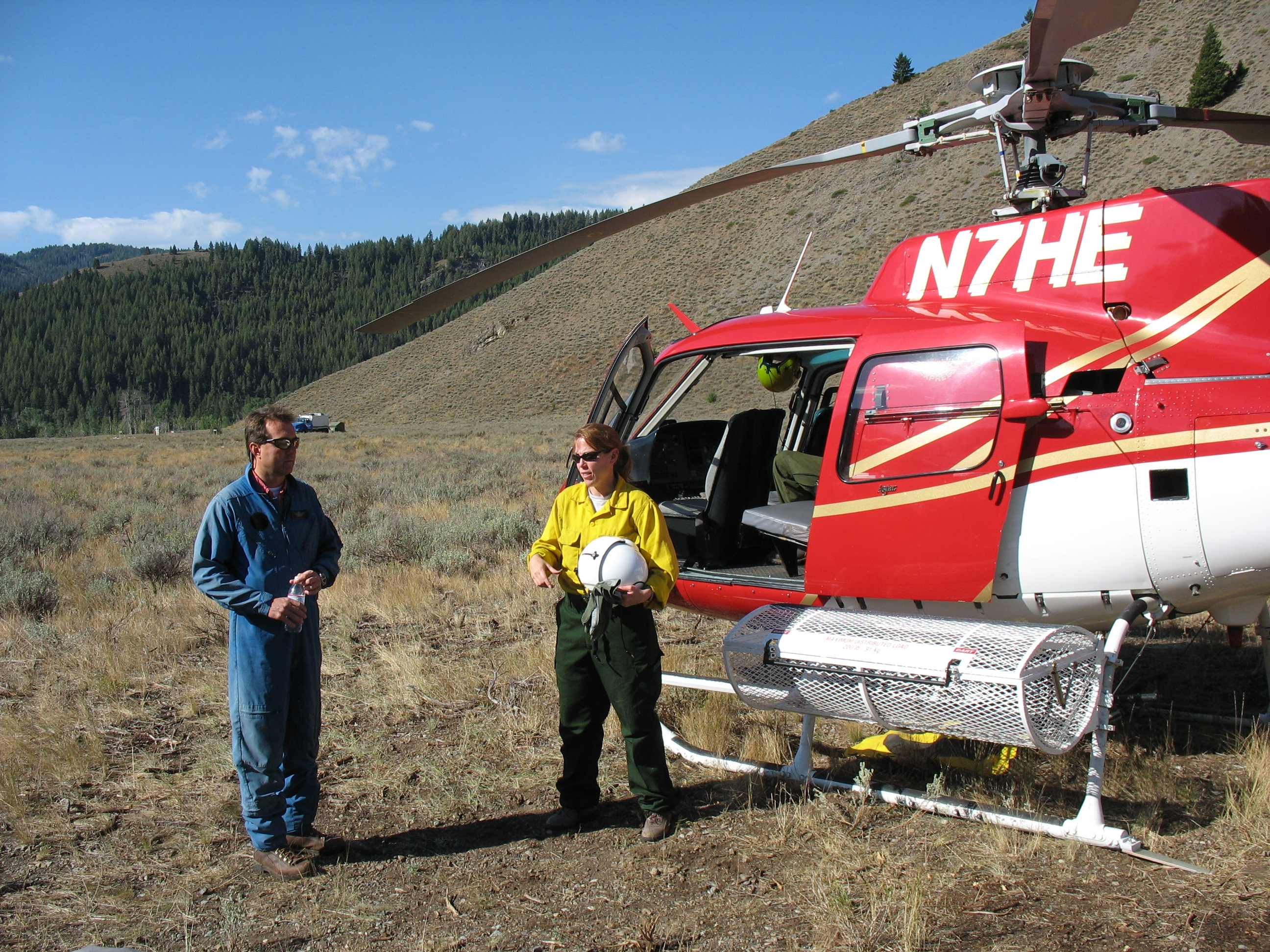
Castle Rock Fire fighters

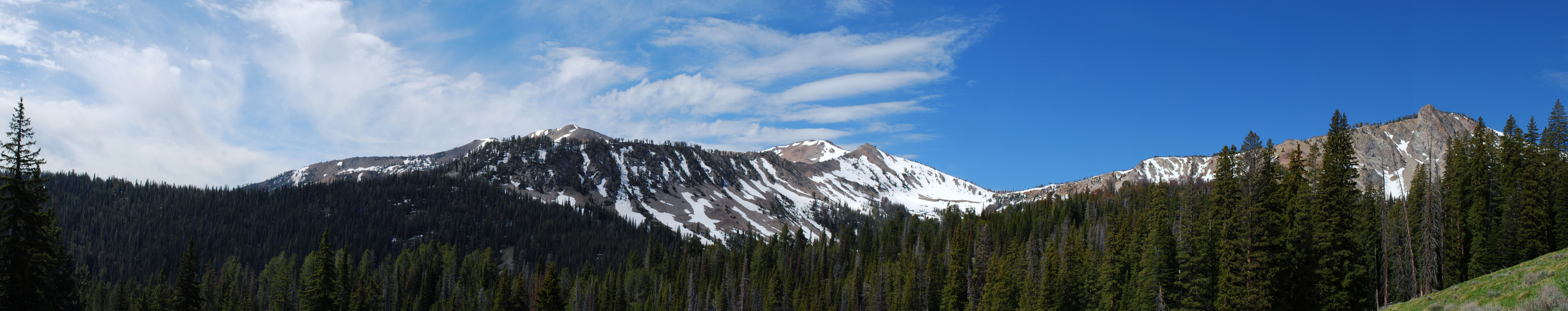
Along the trail to Baker Lake

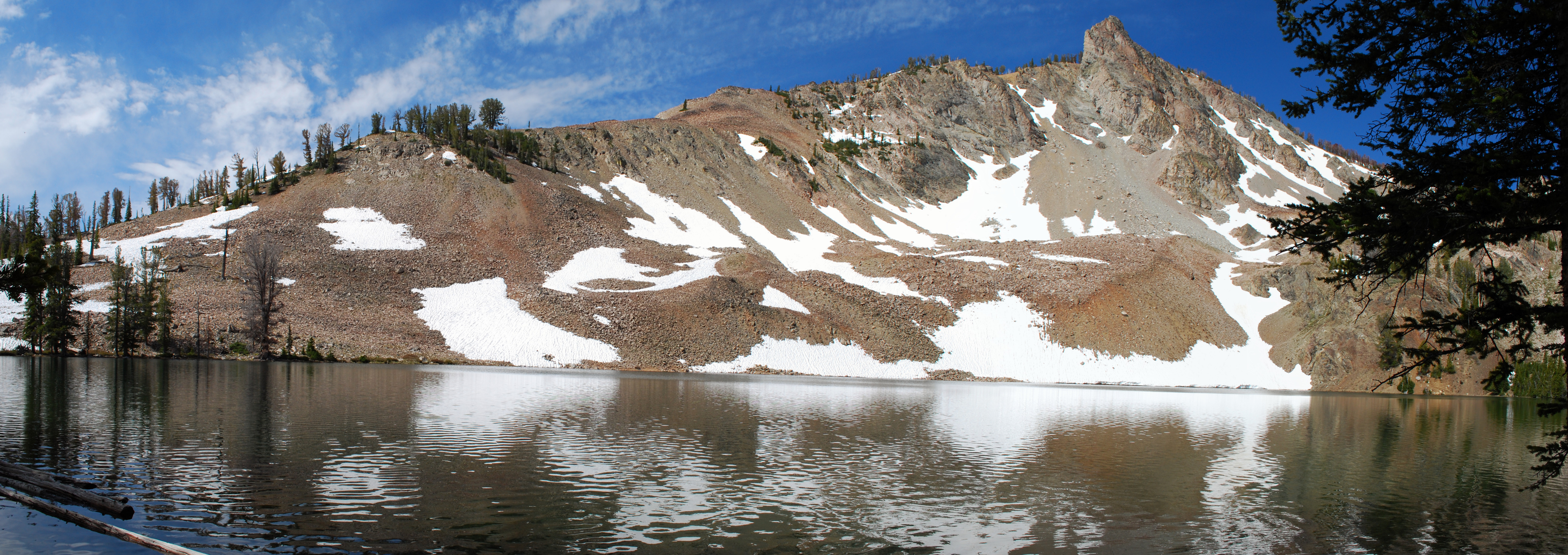
Baker Lake

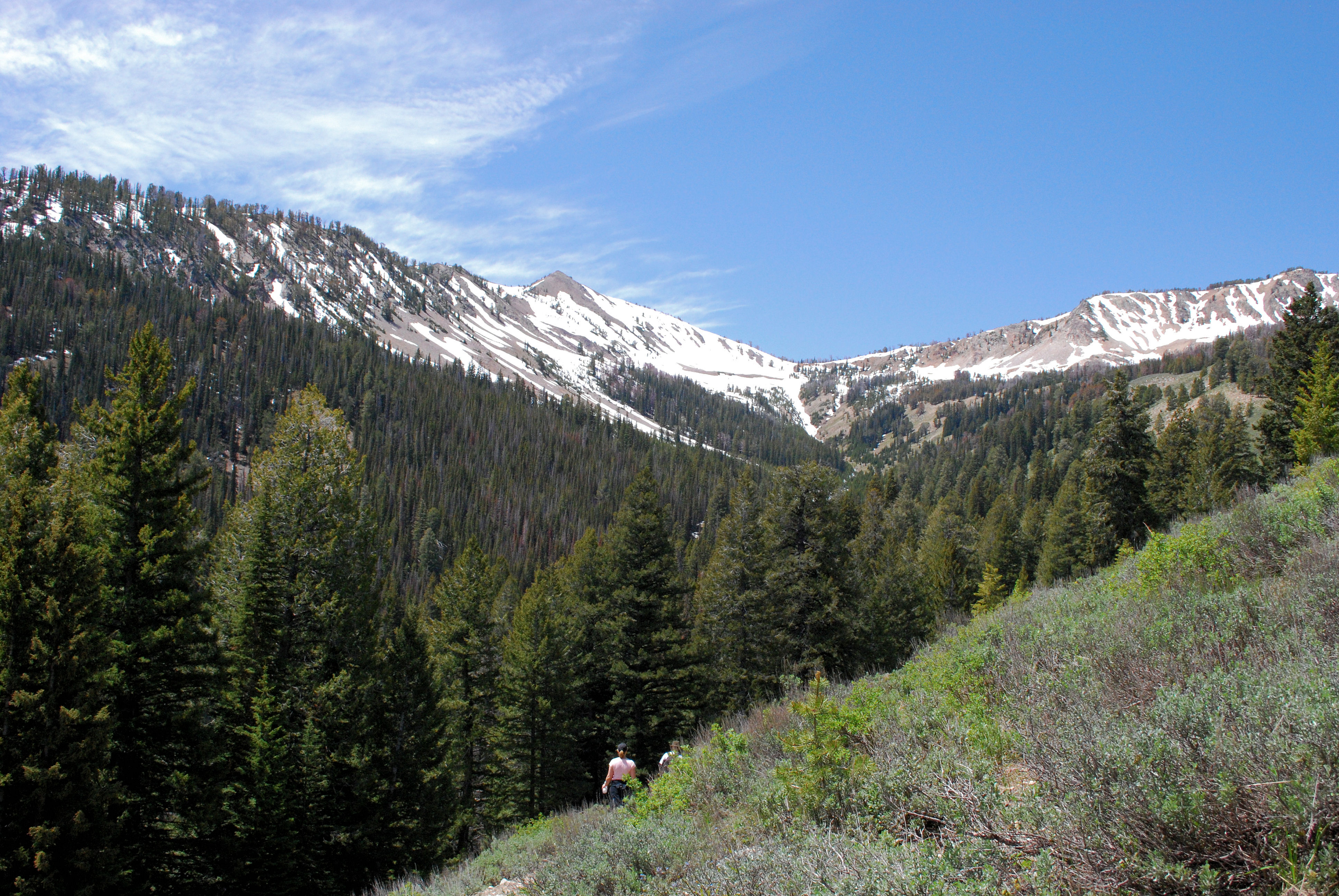
Along the trail to Baker Lake

== See also ==
- Sawtooth National Recreation Area
- Sawtooth National Forest
- Media related to Smoky Mountains (Idaho) at Wikimedia Commons
