= Buttercup Mountain =

Mountain in the state of Idaho

- Location within Idaho

Highest point
- Elevation: 9,079 ft (2,767 m)
- Prominence: 580 ft (180 m)
- Parent peak: Cup Benchmark
- Coordinates: 43°30′56″N 114°34′37″W

Geography
- Location: Blaine and Camas counties, Idaho, U.S.
- Parent range: Smoky Mountains
- Topo map: USGS Buttercup Mountain

Climbing
- Easiest route: Simple scramble, class 2

Buttercup Mountain is a peak in the Smoky Mountains of Idaho, United States. The peak is 9,079 feet (2,767 m) above sea level in Sawtooth National Forest on the border of Blaine and Camas counties. It is in the watersheds of Willow and Deer creeks. It is about 5.75 mi (9.25 km) northwest of Kelly Mountain and 8.3 mi (13.4 km) southeast of Dollarhide Mountain. No roads or trails go to the summit.
