= Salmon Brook (Merrimack River tributary) =

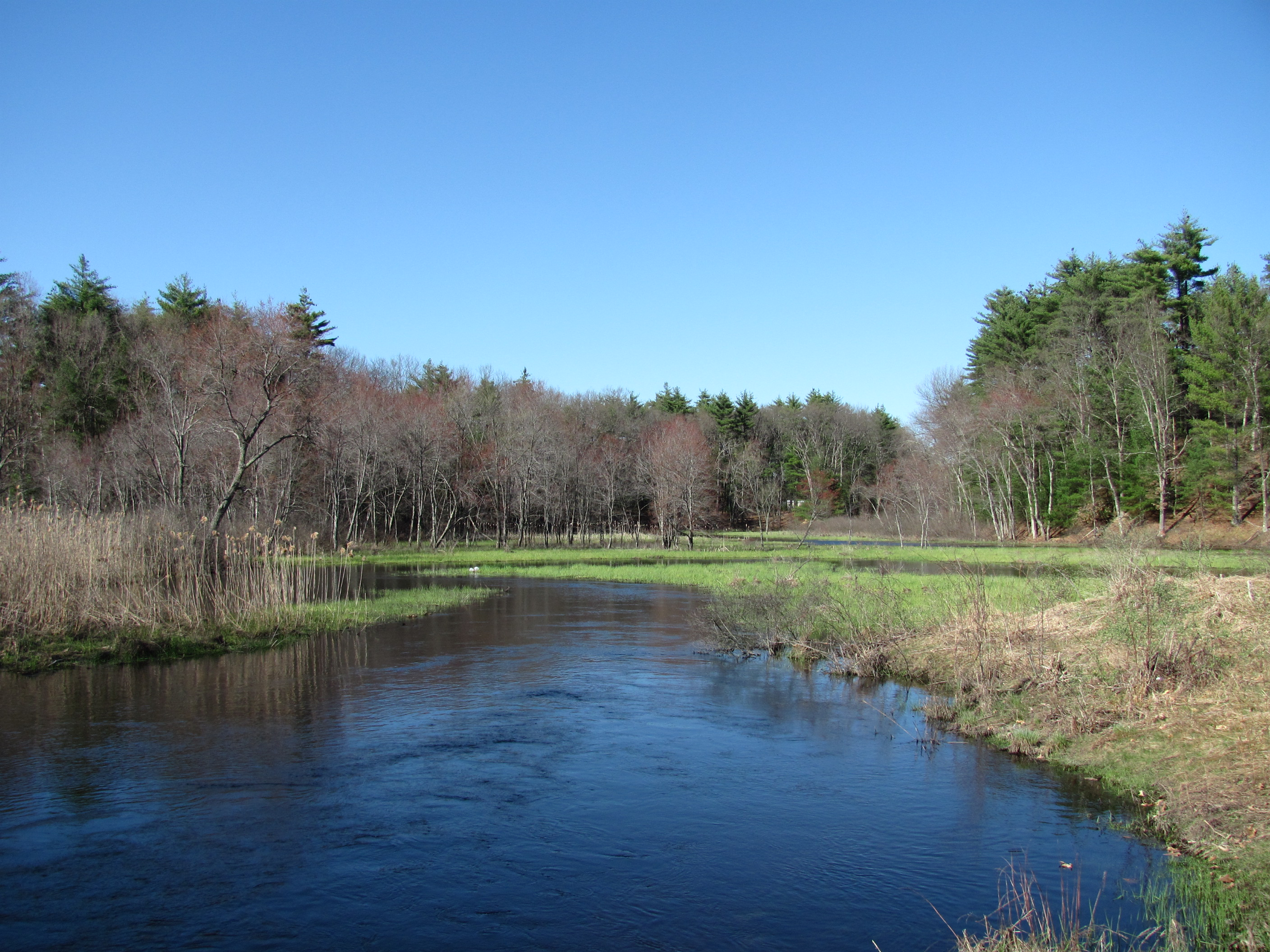
- Salmon Brook in Dunstable, Massachusetts

- Location within Massachusetts Location within New Hampshire Location within the United States

Location
- Country: United States
- States: Massachusetts, New Hampshire
- Counties: Middlesex, MA, Hillsborough, NH
- Communities: Dunstable, MA, Nashua, NH

Physical characteristics
- Source: Lower Massapoag Pond
  - location: Groton, MA
  - coordinates: 42°40′7″N 71°29′39″W
  - elevation: 154 ft (47 m)
- Mouth: Merrimack River
  - location: Nashua, NH
  - coordinates: 42°44′55″N 71°26′30″W
  - elevation: 95 ft (29 m)
- Length: 9.3 mi (15.0 km)
- Basin size: 36 square miles (93 km^{2})
- Discharge
  - average: 150 cu ft/s (4.2 m^{3}/s)

Basin features
- Tributaries
  - left: Hauk Brook, Joint Grass Brook, Hassells Brook
  - right: Black Brook, Old Maids Brook

Salmon Brook is one of the six major tributaries of the Merrimack River in northeastern Massachusetts in the United States. Its watershed is 31 square miles (80 km^{2}) and is one of the 14 subwatersheds of the Merrimack River. It passes through Dunstable, Massachusetts, and Nashua, New Hampshire.

== Route description ==
Salmon Brook begins at the outlet of Lower Massapoag Pond near the center of Dunstable. It then flows approximately 9.3 miles (15.0 km) north-northeast to the Merrimack River. The water body farthest upstream in the watershed is Martins Pond just east of the center of the town of Groton. The outlet, Martins Pond Brook, runs southeast to Lost Lake/Knops Pond, the start of a chain of lakes that includes Whitney Pond, Cow Pond, and Upper and Lower Massapoag ponds. All of these water bodies are dammed. Salmon Brook runs roughly parallel to the Nashua River for its entire course from Lower Massapoag Pond to the Merrimack River.

== See also ==
- List of rivers of Massachusetts
- List of rivers of New Hampshire
