= Kelly Mountain =

Kelly Mountain can refer to the following mountains:

== Other places ==
- Mount Kelly (Antarctica), peak in the Anare Mountains, Antarctica
- Kelly Mountain, near Mount Kelly, Queensland, Australia
- Kellys Mountain, in Victoria County, Nova Scotia, Canada

== United States ==
- Kelly Mountain (Alaska)
- Kelly Mountain (Arkansas)
- Kelly Mountain (California)
- Kelly Mountain (Georgia)
- Kelly Mountain (Blaine County, Idaho)
- Kelly Mountain (Bonneville County, Idaho)
- Kelly Mountain (Idaho County, Idaho)
- Kelly Mountain (Kootenai County, Idaho)
- Kelly Mountain (Washington County, Idaho)
- Kelly Mountain (Penobscot County, Maine)
- Kelly Mountain (Somerset County, Maine)
- Kelly Mountain (Montana), a mountain in Lake County
- Kelly Mountain (Oregon)
- Kelly Mountain (Chelan County, Washington)
- Kelly Mountain (Ferry County, Washington)
- Kelly Mountain (West Virginia)
