= Titus Peak =

Mountain in Idaho, United States

- Location within Idaho

Highest point
- Elevation: 10,110 ft (3,080 m)
- Prominence: 250 ft (76 m)
- Coordinates: 43°50′11″N 114°42′41″W

Geography
- Location: Blaine County, Idaho, U.S.
- Parent range: Smoky Mountains

Titus Peak, at 10,110 feet (3,080 m) above sea level is the seventh highest peak in the Smoky Mountains of Idaho. The peak is located in Sawtooth National Recreation Area in Blaine County. It is located about 0.6 mi (0.97 km) southeast of Lower Titus Peak and northeast of Saviers Peak. No roads or trails go to the summit.
