= Baker Lake (Blaine County, Idaho) =

Lake in Blaine County, Idaho, USA

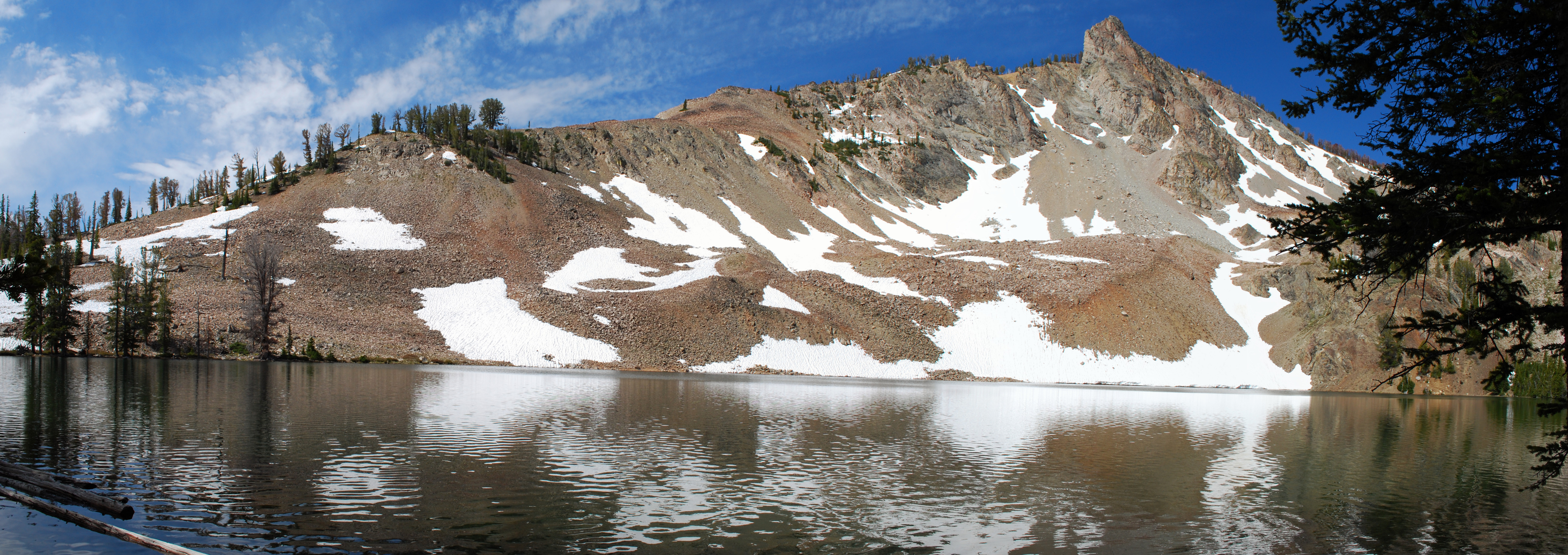

- Location in Idaho Location in the United States
- Location: Blaine County, Idaho
- Coordinates: 43°41′26″N 114°40′32″W
- Lake type: Glacial
- Primary outflows: Baker Creek to Big Wood River
- Basin countries: United States
- Max. length: 920 ft (280 m)
- Max. width: 490 ft (150 m)
- Surface area: 8.6 acres (3.5 ha)
- Surface elevation: 8,799 ft (2,682 m)

Baker Lake is an alpine lake in Blaine County, Idaho, United States, located in the Smoky Mountains in Sawtooth National Forest. The lake is most easily accessed via a trail from the end of forest road 162. The lake is located just east of Backdrop Peak and north of Baker Peak.
