= Big Peak =

Big Peak may refer to:

- Big Peak (Plumas County, California)
- Big Peak (Camas County, Idaho)
- Big Peak (Custer County, Montana), a mountain in Custer County, Montana
