= Smoky Lake (Blaine County, Idaho) =

Alpine lake in the state of Idaho

- Location within Idaho Location within the United States
- Location: Blaine County, Idaho
- Coordinates: 43°44′22″N 114°39′34″W
- Type: Glacial
- Primary outflows: Norton Creek to Baker Creek to Big Wood River
- Basin countries: United States
- Max. length: 330 ft (100 m)
- Max. width: 310 ft (94 m)
- Surface elevation: 9,040 ft (2,760 m)

Smoky Lake is an alpine lake in Blaine County, Idaho, United States, located in the Smoky Mountains in Sawtooth National Forest. While no trails lead to the lake, it is most easily accessed from the end of forest road 170. The lake is located just southeast of Prairie Creek Peak. It is also near Little Lost Lake, Big Lost Lake, and Upper and Lower Norton lakes.
