= Griffin Butte =

Mountain in the state of Idaho

- Location within Idaho

Highest point
- Elevation: 8,411 ft (2,564 m)
- Prominence: 871 ft (265 m)
- Coordinates: 43°43′48″N 114°25′11″W

Geography
- Location: Blaine County, Idaho, U.S.
- Parent range: Smoky Mountains
- Topo map: USGS Griffin Butte

Climbing
- Easiest route: Simple scramble, class 2

Griffin Butte, at 8,411 feet (2,564 m) above sea level is a peak in the Smoky Mountains of Idaho. The peak is located in Sawtooth National Forest in Blaine County northwest of Ketchum. It is located in the watershed of the Big Wood River. It is about 1.75 mi (2.82 km) west of Idaho State Highway 75. No roads or trails go to the summit.
