= Mahoney Butte =

Mountain in Idaho, United States

- Location within Idaho

Highest point
- Elevation: 7,904 ft (2,409 m)
- Prominence: 484 ft (148 m)
- Coordinates: 43°35′49″N 114°27′15″W

Geography
- Location: Blaine County, Idaho, U.S.
- Parent range: Smoky Mountains
- Topo map: USGS Mahoney Butte

Mahoney Butte, at 7,904 feet (2,409 m) above sea level is a peak in the Smoky Mountains of Idaho. The peak is located in Sawtooth National Forest in Blaine County. It is located in the watershed of Greenhorn Creek, a tributary of the Big Wood River. It is about 4.6 mi (7.4 km) southwest of Bald Mountain. No roads or trails go to the summit, although the peak is most easily accessed from trails at the end of road 117.
