= Camas County Highpoint =

Mountain in Idaho, United States

- Location within Idaho

Highest point
- Elevation: 10,337 ft (3,151 m)
- Prominence: 240 ft (73 m)
- Coordinates: 43°48′53″N 114°43′10″W

Geography
- Location: Blaine and Camas counties, Idaho, U.S.
- Parent range: Smoky Mountains
- Topo map: USGS Galena

Climbing
- Easiest route: Simple scramble, class 2

Camas County Highpoint, at 10,337 feet (3,151 m) above sea level is the second highest peak in the Smoky Mountains of Idaho and the highest point in Camas County. Located on the border of Blaine and Camas counties, Camas County Highpoint is about 0.6 miles (970 m) south-southwest of the range's highest point, Saviers Peak. The peak is also on the border of Sawtooth National Recreation Area and the Fairfield Ranger District of Sawtooth National Forest.
