= Dollar Lake (Blaine County, Idaho) =

Lake in Idaho, United States

- Location in Idaho Location in the United States
- Location: Blaine County, Idaho
- Coordinates: 43°41′18″N 114°25′06″W
- Primary outflows: Warm Springs Creek to Big Wood River
- Basin countries: United States
- Max. length: 175 ft (53 m)
- Max. width: 150 ft (46 m)
- Surface area: 0.7 acres (0.28 ha)
- Surface elevation: 5,958 ft (1,816 m)

Dollar Lake is a lake in Blaine County, Idaho, United States, located in the Smoky Mountains in Sawtooth National Forest. The lake is located along Warm Springs Creek along forest road 227 just south of Penny Lake and east of the town of Ketchum.
