= Norton Peak =

Mountain in the state of Idaho

- Location within Idaho

Highest point
- Elevation: 10,336 ft (3,150 m)
- Prominence: 1,256 ft (383 m)
- Coordinates: 43°45′43″N 114°39′11″W

Geography
- Location: Blaine County, Idaho, U.S.
- Parent range: Smoky Mountains
- Topo map: USGS Galena

Climbing
- Easiest route: Simple scramble, class 2

Norton Peak, at 10,336 feet (3,150 m) above sea level is the third highest peak in the Smoky Mountains of Idaho. The peak is in Blaine County and Sawtooth National Recreation Area about 1.5 miles (2.4 km) northeast of the Camas County border. It is the 331st highest peak in Idaho. Miner Lake is on the west side of the peak, and Upper and Lower Norton lakes are south of the peak.
