= Bromaghin Peak =

Mountain in Idaho, United States

- Location within Idaho

Highest point
- Elevation: 10,225 ft (3,117 m)
- Prominence: 185 ft (56 m)
- Coordinates: 43°49′50″N 114°43′09″W

Geography
- Location: Blaine County, Idaho, U.S.
- Parent range: Smoky Mountains
- Topo map: USGS Galena

Climbing
- Easiest route: Scramble, class 3

Bromaghin Peak, at 10,225 feet (3,117 m) above sea level is the fourth highest peak in the Smoky Mountains of Idaho. The peak is in Sawtooth National Recreation Area about 0.6 miles (0.97 km) north-northwest of the range's highest point, Saviers Peak. The peak is named for Captain Ralph Bromaghin, who was a member of the 10th Mountain Division and a Sun Valley ski instructor who died in World War II.
