= Miner Lake =

Alpine lake in the state of Idaho

- Location within Idaho Location within the United States
- Location: Blaine County, Idaho
- Coordinates: 43°45′33″N 114°39′55″W
- Type: Glacial
- Primary outflows: Miner Creek to Prairie Creek to Big Wood River
- Basin countries: United States
- Max. length: 1,280 ft (390 m)
- Max. width: 790 ft (240 m)
- Surface elevation: 8,785 ft (2,678 m)

Miner Lake is an alpine lake in Blaine County, Idaho, United States, located in the Smoky Mountains in Sawtooth National Recreation Area of Sawtooth National Forest. The lake is most easily accessed via trail 135 from the end of forest road 179. The lake is located just west of Norton Peak and north of Prairie Cree Peak.
