= Bear Peak (Blaine County, Idaho) =

Mountain in Idaho, United States

- Location within Idaho

Highest point
- Elevation: 9,525 ft (2,903 m)
- Prominence: 505 ft (154 m)
- Coordinates: 43°40′32″N 114°35′22″W

Geography
- Location: Blaine County, Idaho, U.S.
- Parent range: Smoky Mountains
- Topo map: USGS Boyle Mountain

Bear Peak, at 9,525 feet (2,903 m) above sea level is a peak in the Smoky Mountains of Idaho. The peak is located in Sawtooth National Forest in Blaine County. It is located about 4.6 mi (7.4 km) east of Baker Peak. No roads or trails go to the summit.
