= Titus Lake =

Alpine lake in Blaine County, Idaho, United States

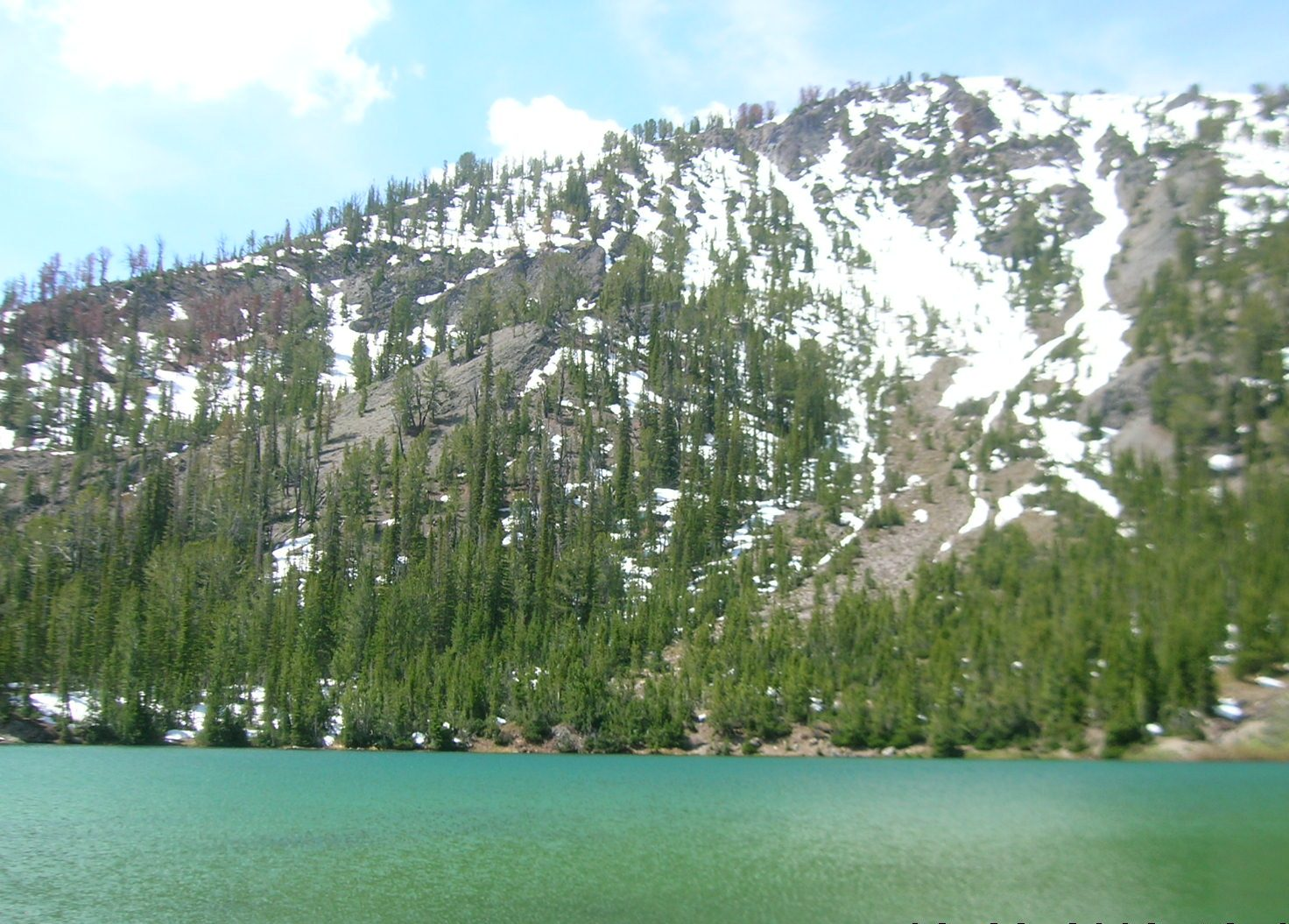

- Location within Idaho Location within the United States
- Location: Blaine County, Idaho
- Coordinates: 43°51′18″N 114°42′38″W
- Type: Glacial
- Primary outflows: Titus Creek to Big Wood River
- Basin countries: United States
- Max. length: 345 ft (105 m)
- Max. width: 305 ft (93 m)
- Surface elevation: 8,920 ft (2,720 m)

Titus Lake is an alpine lake in Blaine County, Idaho, United States, located in the Smoky Mountains in Sawtooth National Recreation Area of Sawtooth National Forest. The lake is most easily accessed via a trail from just below Galena Summit on Idaho State Highway 75.
