= Snowslide Lake =

Body of water in Idaho, United States

- Location within Idaho Location within the United States
- Location: Camas County, Idaho
- Coordinates: 43°44′19″N 114°49′31″W
- Type: Glacial
- Primary outflows: Snowslide Creek to Big Smoky Creek to South Fork Boise River
- Basin countries: United States
- Max. length: 335 ft (102 m)
- Max. width: 200 ft (61 m)
- Surface elevation: 8,760 ft (2,670 m)

Snowslide Lake is an alpine lake in Camas County, Idaho, United States, located in the Smoky Mountains in Sawtooth National Forest. The lake is most easily accessed via trail 070. The lake is located east of Paradise Peak.
