= Paradise Lake (Camas County, Idaho) =

Alpine lake in the state of Idaho

- Location within Idaho Location within the United States
- Location: Camas County, Idaho
- Coordinates: 43°44′00″N 114°50′46″W
- Type: Glacial
- Primary outflows: unnamed Creek to Paradise Creek to South Fork Boise River
- Basin countries: United States
- Max. length: 580 ft (180 m)
- Max. width: 275 ft (84 m)
- Surface elevation: 8,990 ft (2,740 m)

Paradise Lake is an alpine lake in Camas County, Idaho, United States, located in the Smoky Mountains in the Sawtooth National Forest. While no trails lead directly to the lake, it is most easily accessed via trail 070. The lake is located just south of Paradise Peak.
