= Dollarhide Mountain =

Mountain in Idaho, United States

- Location within Idaho

Highest point
- Elevation: 9,301 ft (2,835 m)
- Prominence: 481 ft (147 m)
- Coordinates: 43°50′11″N 114°42′41″W

Geography
- Location: Blaine and Camas counties, Idaho, U.S.
- Parent range: Smoky Mountains
- Topo map: USGS Dollarhide Mountain

Climbing
- Easiest route: Simple scramble, class 2

Dollarhide Mountain, at 9,301 feet (2,835 m) above sea level is a peak in the Smoky Mountains of Idaho. The peak is located in Sawtooth National Forest on the border of Blaine and Camas counties. It is located about 4.2 mi (6.8 km) south of Baker Peak. Forest Road 227 travels near the peak over a road pass known as Dollarhide Summit. No roads or trails go to the summit.
