= Backdrop Peak =

Mountain in the state of Idaho

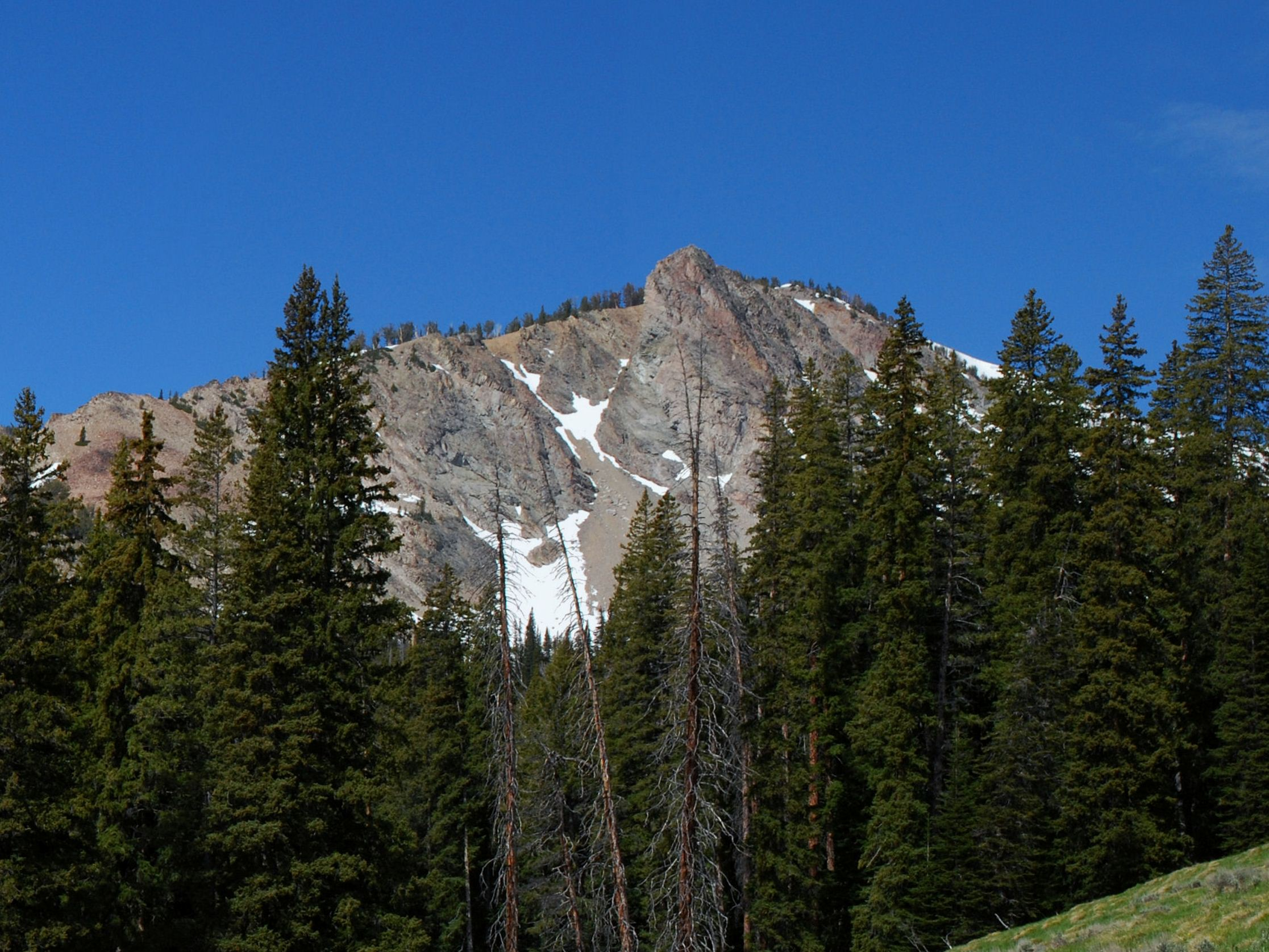
- Backdrop Peak from the Baker Lake Trail

Highest point
- Elevation: 10,099 ft (3,078 m)
- Prominence: 639 ft (195 m)
- Coordinates: 43°41′20″N 114°41′12″W

Geography
- Location within Idaho
- Location: Blaine and Camas counties, Idaho, U.S.
- Parent range: Smoky Mountains
- Topo map: USGS Baker Peak

Climbing
- Easiest route: Scramble, class 3

Backdrop Peak, at 10,099 feet (3,078 m) above sea level is a peak in the Smoky Mountains of Idaho. Located in Sawtooth National Forest on the border of Blaine and Camas counties, Backdrop Peak is about 1.45 miles (2,330 m) north of Baker Peak. Baker Lake is just east of the peak.

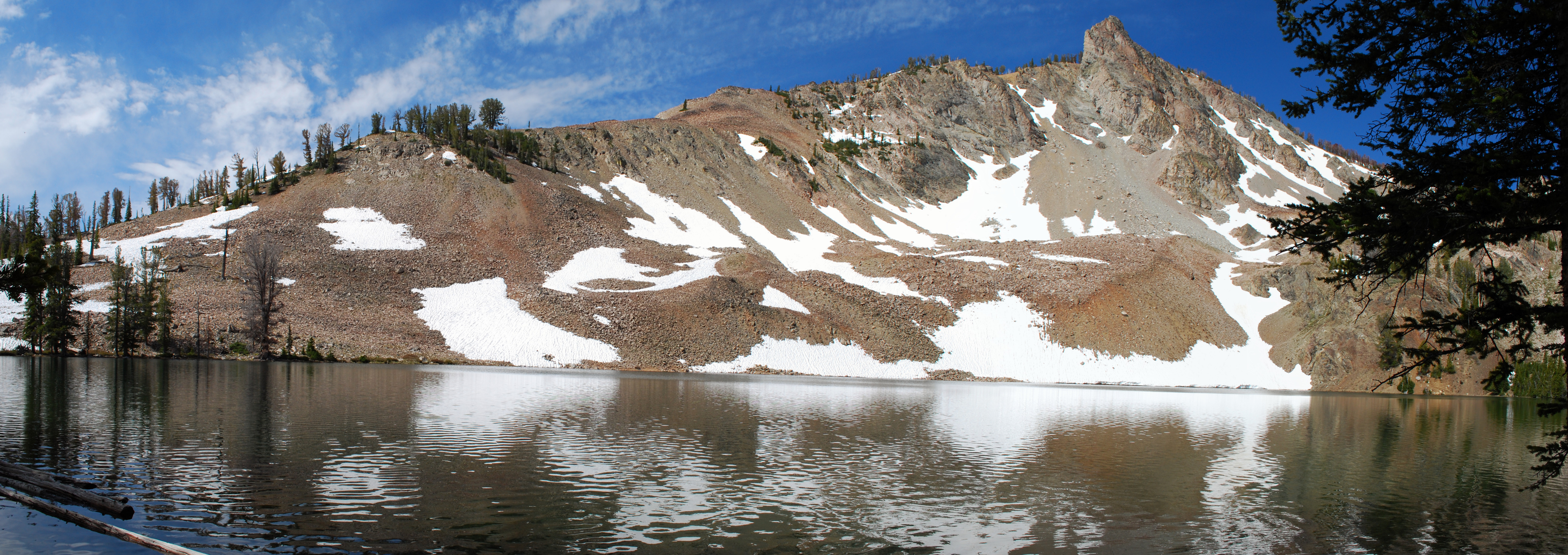
Backdrop Peak and Baker Lake
