= Paradise Peak (Idaho) =

Mountain in the Smoky Mountains of Idaho

- Location within Idaho

Highest point
- Elevation: 9,798 ft (2,986 m)
- Prominence: 818 ft (249 m)
- Coordinates: 43°44′19″N 114°50′57″W

Geography
- Location: Camas County, Idaho, U.S.
- Parent range: Smoky Mountains
- Topo map: USGS Paradise Peak

Climbing
- Easiest route: Scramble, class 3

Paradise Peak, at 9,798 feet (2,986 m) above sea level is a peak in the Smoky Mountains of Idaho. The peak is located in Sawtooth National Forest in Camas County. It is located in the watersheds of Paradise and Emma creeks and the South Fork of the Boise River. It is about 4 mi (6.4 km) northwest of Skillern Peak, 0.35 mi (0.56 km) northwest of Paradise Lake, and 1.2 mi (1.9 km) west of Snowslide Lake. No roads or trails go to the summit.
