= Carbonate Mountain (Idaho) =

Mountain in Idaho, United States

- Location within Idaho

Highest point
- Elevation: 6,714 ft (2,046 m)
- Prominence: 294 ft (90 m)
- Coordinates: 43°32′13″N 114°20′34″W

Geography
- Location: Blaine County, Idaho, U.S.
- Parent range: Smoky Mountains

Carbonate Mountain, at 6,714 feet (2,046 m) above sea level is a peak in the Smoky Mountains of Idaho. The peak is located on the west side of the Wood River Valley northwest of downtown Hailey in Blaine County. Much of the mountain is located on private land, but three small parcels are managed by the Bureau of Land Management.
