= Kelly Mountain (Blaine County, Idaho) =

Mountain in the state of Idaho

- Location within Idaho

Highest point
- Elevation: 8,826 ft (2,690 m) NAVD 88
- Prominence: 1,446 ft (441 m)
- Parent peak: Buttercup Mountain
- Coordinates: 43°29′33″N 114°28′01″W

Geography
- Location: Blaine County, Idaho, U.S.
- Parent range: Smoky Mountains
- Topo map: USGS Richardson Summit

Kelly Mountain, with a summit elevation of 8,826 feet (2,690 m), is a peak in the Smoky Mountains of Idaho. The peak is located in Blaine County on the border of Sawtooth National Forest and Bureau of Land Management land. It is located in the watersheds of Elk, Kelly, and Wolftone creeks, all in the watershed of the Big Wood River. It is about 5.8 mi (9.3 km) southeast of Buttercup Mountain. No roads or trails go to the summit.
