= Knops Pond =

Lake in Middlesex County, Massachusetts

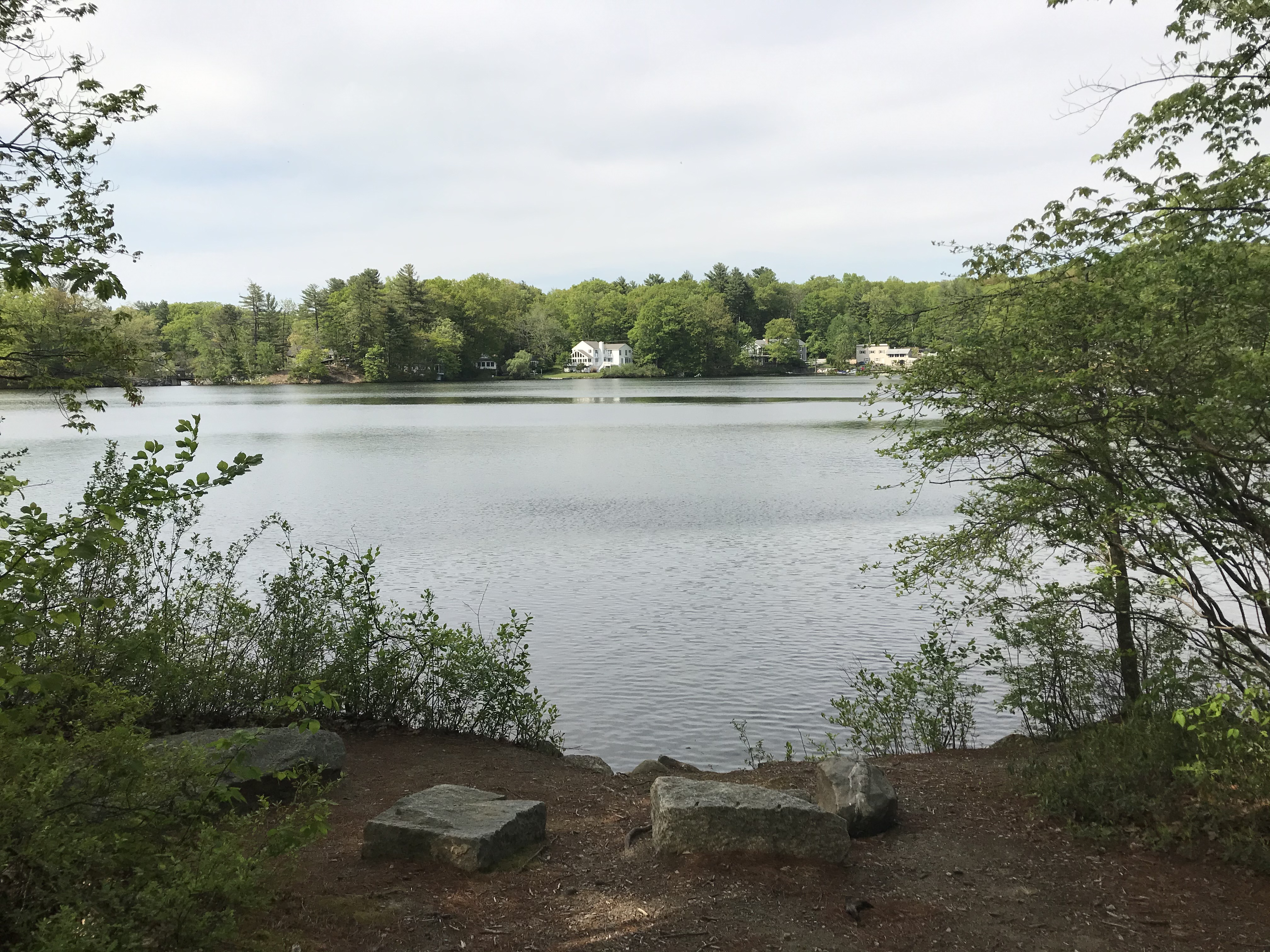
- Knops Pond

- Location within Massachusetts
- Location: Middlesex County, Massachusetts
- Coordinates: 42.5871396°N 71.5232789°W
- Type: lake

Knops Pond is a lake in Middlesex County, in the U.S. state of Massachusetts.

Knops Pond was named after James Knapp (or Knop), a pioneer citizen.

== See also ==
- Lost Lake (Groton)
