= Big Lost Lake =

Alpine lake in the state of Idaho

- Location in Idaho Location in the United States
- Location: Blaine County, Idaho
- Coordinates: 43°44′38″N 114°39′44″W
- Lake type: Glacial
- Primary outflows: Norton Creek to Baker Creek to Big Wood River
- Basin countries: United States
- Max. length: 968 ft (295 m)
- Max. width: 690 ft (210 m)
- Surface area: 8.6 acres (3.5 ha)
- Surface elevation: 9,163 ft (2,793 m)

Big Lost Lake is an alpine lake that is found in Blaine County, Idaho, United States. It is located in the Smoky Mountains, in the Sawtooth National Forest.

The lake is most easily accessed via trail 135 from the end of forest road 170. The lake is located just east of Prairie Creek Peak. It is also near Smoky Lake, Little Lost Lake, and Upper and Lower Norton lakes.
