= Lost Lake (Groton) =

Lake in Massachusetts, United States

- Location within Massachusetts Location within the United States
- Location: Groton, Massachusetts
- Coordinates: 42°35′36″N 71°31′41″W
- Type: lake
- Basin countries: United States
- Surface area: 204 acres (83 ha)
- Average depth: 6 to 8 ft (1.8 to 2.4 m)
- Max. depth: 30 ft (9.1 m)
- Surface elevation: 213 ft (65 m)

Lost Lake, also known as Knop/p/s Pond, is a reservoir in Groton, Massachusetts, United States. It was formed from three lakes by the headwaters of Salmon Brook. The southern part of the lake is known as Knops Pond where it is near 30 feet (9.1 m) deep. It is stocked with rainbow, brown and brook trout every spring and fall and is home to several species of warm water fish. A boat launch is located on the northeastern side of the lake.
