= Upper Norton Lake =

Alpine lake in the state of Idaho

- Location within Idaho Location within the United States
- Location: Blaine County, Idaho
- Coordinates: 43.751912°N 114.656145°W
- Type: Glacial
- Primary outflows: Norton Creek to Baker Creek to Big Wood River
- Basin countries: United States
- Max. length: 915 ft (279 m)
- Max. width: 350 ft (110 m)
- Surface elevation: 9,120 ft (2,780 m)

Upper Norton Lake is an alpine lake in Blaine County, Idaho, United States, located in the Smoky Mountains in Sawtooth National Forest. It is most easily accessed from trail 135 from the end of forest road 170. The lake is located northeast of Prairie Creek Peak. It is also near Smoky Lake, Big Lost Lake, Little Lost Lake, and Lower Norton Lake.
