= Lost Lake (Clare County, Michigan) =

Lake in the state of Michigan, United States

- Location within Michigan Location within the United States
- Location: Clare County, Michigan
- Coordinates: 43°54′55″N 85°02′08″W
- Type: Lake
- Basin countries: United States
- Max. length: 0.20 mi (0.32 km)
- Max. width: 0.35 mi (0.56 km)
- Surface area: 66 acres (27 ha)
- Shore length^{1}: c. 0.90 miles (1.45 km)
- Surface elevation: 1,040 ft (320 m)
- ^{1} Shore length is not a well-defined measure.

Lost Lake is a lake in Clare County, Michigan, United States. It is 66-acre (27 ha) large and focal point for Boy Scout activities on the Lost Lake Scout Reservation.

== See also ==
- List of lakes in Michigan
