= Titus Creek =

Stream in the U.S. state of Missouri

Coordinates: 40.028925°N 92.403798°W

Titus Creek is a stream in Adair and Macon Counties in the U.S. state of Missouri.

Titus Creek has the name of William Titus, the proprietor of a local watermill.

== See also ==
- List of rivers of Missouri
