= Great Lakes Field Service Council =

American Boy Scout organization

- Owner: Boy Scouts of America
- Headquarters: Detroit, Michigan
- Location: Wayne, Oakland, and Macomb counties
- Country: United States
- Founded: October 1, 2009
- Defunct: 2021
- Scout Executive: Vic Pooler
- Commissioner: Jody Batten
- President: Jim Huttenlocher
- Website www.michiganscouting.org

The Great Lakes Field Service Council was a field service council of the Michigan Crossroads Council, a local council of the Boy Scouts of America. It served the Detroit metropolitan area and covers all of Wayne, Oakland and Macomb counties. The council had eight districts, one council service center, and four camp properties.

The Great Lakes Field Service Council was the result of a 2012 merger of nine local councils into a statewide council due to an initiative to reorganize the administrative structure of the Boy Scouts of America.

The Great Lakes Field Service Council was merged into the Eastern Division of the Michigan Crossroads Council in 2020 and as a result the Noquet Lodge #29 was officially merged into the Mishigami Lodge #29. Any references to the Council and/or Lodge are accurate to their final form before their respective mergers.

== Organization ==
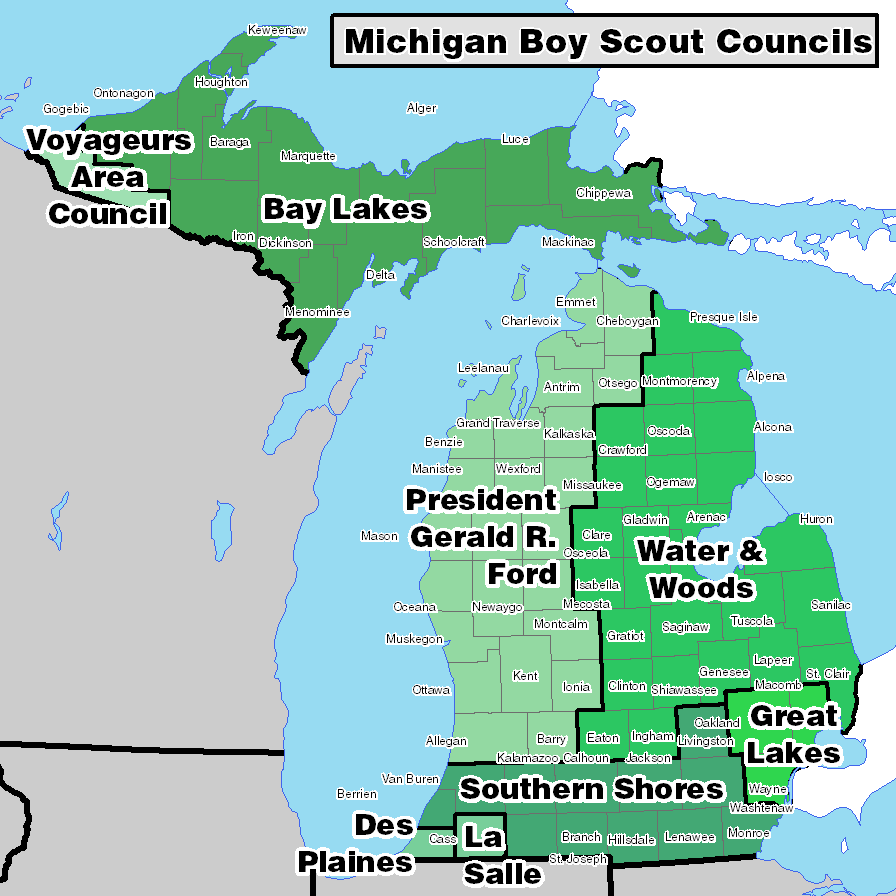
BSA Councils in Michigan. The Great Lakes FSC serves Scouts in Metro Detroit.

The Great Lakes Field Service Council is divided into eight districts divided by the school and religious districts they serve.

- Chippewa District serves the school districts of Anchor Bay, Armada, Avondale, Chippewa Valley, Clintondale, Lanse Cruse, Mt Clemens, New Haven, Richmond, Rochester, Romeo, and Utica.
- Mahican District serves the school districts of Allen Park, Crestwood, Dearborn, Dearborn Hts No. 7, Ecorse, Flat Rock, Gibraltar, Grosse Ile, Huron, Lincoln Park, Melvindale/North Allen Park, River Rouge, Riverview, Southgate, Taylor, Trenton, Westwood, Woodhaven, and Wyandotte covering the vast majority of the area known as Downriver.
- North Star District serves the Berkley, Birmingham, Bloomfield Hills, Clawson, Troy, Lamphere, Royal Oak, and Madison School Districts and the Bloomfield Hills Stake (LDS).
- Ottawa District serves the school districts of Farmington, Huron Valley, Northville, Novi, South Lyon, Walled Lake, and West Bloomfield.
- Pontiac-Manito District serves the school districts of Brandon, Clarkston, Holly, Lake Orion, Oxford, Pontiac, Waterford, and the Grand Blanc Stake (LDS).
- Renaissance District serves the school districts of Detroit, Ferndale, Hamtramck, Hazel Park, Highland Park, Oak Park, and Southfield covering the entire city of Detroit (except LDS units in the city which are grouped in either the Bloomfield Hills or Westland Stakes).
- Sunrise District serves the school districts of Center Line, Eastpointe, Fitzgerald, Fraser, Grosse Pointe, Harper Woods, Lakeshore, Lakeview, Roseville, South Lake, Van Dyke, Warren Consolidated, and Warren Woods.
- Sunset District serves the school districts of Clarenceville, Garden City, Inkster, Livonia, Plymouth/Canton, Redford, Romulus, South Redford, Van Buren, Wayne/Westland, and the Westland Stake (LDS).

== History ==
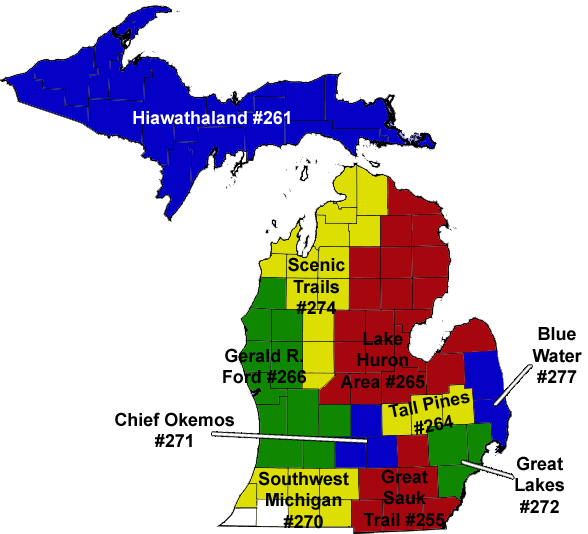
Michigan Boy Scout Councils prior to the Michigan Crossroads Council

The Great Lakes Council was a product of merging the Detroit Area Council and the Clinton Valley Council. On August 4, 2009, the two councils voted to merge and the new Council officially came into existence on October 1, 2009. On November 10, 2009, after a month-long contest, the new name Great Lakes Council was selected to represent the new council.

In 2020, Michigan Crossroads Council made a decision to merge their Field Service Councils to create one central Council.

== Camps ==
Note: while these camps have historically been connected to Scouting in the Metro Detroit area, since 2012 they are all owned and/or operated by the Michigan Crossroads Council rather than the Great Lakes Field Service Council.

=== Camp Agawam ===
Camp Agawam
- Founded: 1918
- Defunct: 2014

Camp Agawam is a 140-acre (0.6 km^{2}) camp located in northern Oakland County, Michigan. Camp Agawam is a Boy Scout Camp and is the third of four pieces of property owned by the Great Lakes Field Service Council. It was purchased in 1918 as Camp Pontiac and renamed in 1938. Camp Agawam features 9 campsites, 3 lodges, and 2 lakes. In 2009, Chippewa 29 received a National OA Grant and will redo the docks on one of the 2 lakes.

There is a living history themed campsite called Fort Pontiac. Fort Pontiac was created by the Chief Pontiac Trail Committee (CPT) as a resource for Scout units to conduct primitive skills training. It includes a blacksmith shoppe, carpentry shoppe and brick oven that may be used by units that have a leader who has taken the FORT Skills training conducted by the CPT. The CPT also conducts living history themed weekends during which the CPT committee members are in attendance in period clothing representing 1775. During these times the CPT fort staff are demonstrating period crafts and providing hands-on activities to those in camp.

Effective January 1, 2013, the camp is closed. With the closure of Camp Agawam, the Chief Pontiac Village has relocated the living history site to Kensington Metropark's Farm Center.

=== Edward N. Cole Canoe Base ===
Edward N. Cole Canoe Base
- Location: Alger, MI
- Founded: 1964

Edward N. Cole Canoe Base is a Boy Scout Camp and Canoe Base for the Great Lakes Field Service Council in Ogemaw County, Michigan. Edward N. Cole Canoe Base is the second of four pieces of property owned by the Great Lakes Field Service Council.

The base was first opened in 1968 as the Rifle River Canoe base. It was renamed Edward N. Cole Canoe Base in honor of Edward N. Cole, VP General Motors Corp., and Detroit Area Council President in 1962. That same year, the service building and Bosco Lake were completed.

Cole has been a Nationally Accredited "A" Rated summer camp facility since 1980, and it boasts one of the highest unit return rates in the nation.

=== D-bar-A Scout Ranch ===
D-bar-A Scout Ranch
- Location: Lapeer, Michigan
- Founded: 1950
- Website michiganscouting.org/outdooradventures/properties/d-bar-a-scout-ranch/

D-bar-A Scout Ranch (Formally known as D-A Scout Ranch) is a Boy Scout ranch located in Metamora, Michigan. The ranch is a 1,700-acre (6.9 km^{2}) piece of wilderness, located on the southern border of Lapeer County, Michigan. The Flint River runs through the northeast corner of camp through the camporee field. It was opened in 1950 and since then has offered Boy Scout summer camp in addition to its other year-round activities, including equestrian and aquatics activities. D-Bar-A has 28 heated cabins and 13 tent sites, along with its 3 lakes.

=== Lost Lake Scout Reservation ===
Lost Lake Scout Reservation
- Founded: 1965
- Founder: Harry Bennett

Lost Lake Scout Reservation (LLSR) was a 2,385-acre (10 km^{2}) camp located in Freeman Township, Clare County in Northern Michigan. LLSR was a Boy Scout Camp and was the fourth of four pieces of property owned by the Great Lakes Field Service Council. It was purchased for $350,000 in 1964. Lost Lake features the very popular week-long summer camp. Scouts from around the United States could attend this camp. The camp has three lakes, the largest is 66-acre (270,000 m^{2}) Lost Lake. The site is also the home of Bennett's Lodge, formerly a retreat owned by Ford Motor Company executive Harry Bennett. Throughout the year, especially summer camp, tours were offered of Bennett Lodge. In 2003, Chippewa Lodge, the former service lodge to the camp, unveiled a new 10-mile trail, dubbed Chippewa "Chippy" Trail, in Lost Lake's back forty. Lost Lake closed at the end of 2012.

== Order of the Arrow - Noquet Lodge 29 ==
Noquet Lodge
- Totem: Bear Claw
- Founded: 2011
- Defunct: 2020

The council was served by the Noquet Lodge 29. The word Noquet means Bear Claw in the Ojibwa language. The lodge used bears and bears claws as symbols on its insignia. Noquet Lodge performed service to all Great Lakes Council Camps, hosted fellowship activities, promoted camping among council Boy Scout Troops and Cub Scout Packs, and attended regional and national Order of the Arrow events.

Noquet Lodge was divided into administrative units called chapters. There were five chapters, each corresponding to one or more of the council's eight districts. Chapters coordinate their own service and fellowship activities, as well as train teams which conduct the membership induction process.

Like all Order of the Arrow programs, the Noquet Lodge had youth leaders who were advised by appointed adults. The seven lodge officers (Chief, Executive Vice-Chief, Vice-Chief of Administration, Vice-Chief of Activities, Vice-Chief of Unit Relations, Treasurer, and Lodge Secretary) were elected annually. The lodge's work was performed by committees which had youth chairmen and adult advisers.

A volunteer Lodge Adviser is appointed by the Scout Executive. The lodge adviser appoints other adults to serve as advisers to specific lodge officers and committees. The Scout Executive also appoints a member of the professional staff to serve a Staff Adviser to the lodge.

When the Great Lakes Council formed in November 2009 through the merger of the Clinton Valley and Detroit Area Council, each council had an Order of the Arrow Lodge. Those two lodges, Chippewa Lodge 29 and Migisi Opawgan Lodge 162, continued to operate while members of both lodges set up the structure for the Noquet Lodge. The Noquet Lodge became the council's Order of the Arrow Lodge in May 2011.

The lodge was part of the Section C-2. Noquet Lodge was divided into five Chapters: Chippewa, Lalai Haki, Migisi Opawgan, Ottawa, Pontiac-Manito. Noquet Lodge was the home lodge of 2012 Central Region Chief Marty Opthoff

After the duration of Mishigami Lodge merger, Noquet Lodge was no longer chartered by the National Order of the Arrow Committee and beginning in late January 2022, after a vote by the Michigan Crossroads Council Executive Committee, the 5 chapters that made up Noquet were split between the East and South Lodge Service Areas of Mishigami as part of a larger realignment

=== Noquet Lodge Chiefs ===
- Jon McCormick: 2011-2012
- Charles Coutteau: 2012-2014
- Andrew Larkin: 2014
- Tyler James: 2015
- John McCoy: 2015-2016
- Nick Meier: 2016-2017
- Jameson Cavanaugh: 2017-2018
- Matthew Sanker: 2018-2019
- Ryan Stults: 2019-2020
- Peter Stavropoulos: 2020-2021

=== Migisi Opawgan Chapter ===
The Detroit Area Council received a charter to create an Order of the Arrow lodge in the summer of 1939. Inductions for the new lodge were held at the Detroit Area Council's two summer camps – Charles Howell Scout Reservation and Camp Brady. The initial inductions were assisted by the Munhake Lodge in Ann Arbor and the Chippewa Lodge in Pontiac. Throughout the summer, the lodge continued to initiate its own members.

The new lodge selected its name and totem as Migisi Opawgan, meaning "Eagle" and "Peace Pipe" respectively, in 1941. The name comes from the Ojibwa Language. The hyphens were removed from the lodge's name in the 1980s. Eagles and Peace Pipes figured prominently in most lodge insignia during its many years. The Lodge was assigned number 162.

Continuing on its initial foundation at Boy Scout Summer Camp, Migisi Opawgan continued to provide service to the Detroit Area Camps. Although camps Brady and Howell were closed in 1959 in 1986, the council acquired different camps which the lodge served. The lodge worked to support the summer camps at D-bar-A Scout Ranch starting in 1951 and Cole Canoe Base starting in 1969.

Migisi Opawgan was involved in the construction and funding of many major projects and Detroit Area Camps. Charles Howell Scout Reservation's O-A Cabin was funded by Migisi Opawgan and its members. At D-bar-A Scout Ranch, the lodge was responsible for the construction and maintenance of a 10-mile hiking trail, the funding, construction, and staffing of the Thomas D. Trainor Scout Museum, and provided the labor for many other projects. Many of the lodge's projects were developed over many years. The initial six-mile loop of the Pedro Trail was completed in 1991. It was expanded to 10 miles ten years later. A fire bowl at D-bar-A's Trout Lake was completed in 1995 and expanded in 2003.

Migisi Opawgan had many administrative structures in place, each representing the needs of the Council and its members. As the lodge grew, the initial camp based chapters were replaced by divisions of the council's territory. At times, each chapter served one or more of the council's districts. In 1974, a clan structure was adopted to provide a layer of administration between chapters and the lodge. When lodge membership declined this level of organization was no longer necessary.

In addition to providing service to Council Camps, Migisi Opawgan participated in regional and national Order of the Arrow Activities, beginning as the host of the first Michigan State Conclave, held in 1947. Nine members of Migisi Opawgan have been presented with the Order of the Arrow's Distinguished Service Award.

Migisi Opawgan also hosted annual Pilgrimages to the council's Abraham Lincoln statue which was on display at Charles Howell Scout Reservation and later moved to D-bar-A Scout Ranch. The Lodge and its chapters also hosted fellowship events for its members. This event was continued by the Noquet Lodge which is the successor to Migisi Opawgan after its merger with the Chippewa Lodge.

Migisi Opawgan became a chapter within the Noquet Lodge in 2011. Migisi Opawgan Chapter recognizes its members at an Annual Awards banquet. Awards were presented to youth and adult leaders, lodge and chapter officers and committee members, and those who had distinguished themselves in outstanding ways. Awards included the Robert Rutherford Service Award, the Russell Neynaber Award, the Harold Oatley Service Award (formerly Arrowman of the Year Award), and the Extended Elangomat Award. After the merger of the 4 lodges of Michigan’s lower peninsula in 2021, Migisi Opawgan Chapter became part of the Noquet Area of Mishigami Lodge 29. On February 1, 2022, in the Mishigami Lodge Area Realignment, the chapter became part of the South Service Area of Mishigami Lodge.

== See also ==
- Scouting in Michigan
