= Penny Lake (Blaine County, Idaho) =

Lake in Idaho, United States

Dollar Lake
- Location within Idaho Location within the United States
- Location: Blaine County, Idaho
- Coordinates: 43°41′10″N 114°25′08″W
- Primary outflows: Warm Springs Creek to Big Wood River
- Basin countries: United States
- Max. length: 235 ft (72 m)
- Max. width: 135 ft (41 m)
- Surface elevation: 5,940 ft (1,810 m)

Penny Lake is a lake in Blaine County, Idaho, United States, located in the Smoky Mountains in Sawtooth National Forest. The lake is located along Warm Springs Creek along forest road 227 just west of Dollar Lake and west of the town of Ketchum.
