= Little Lost Lake =

Lake in the state of Idaho

- Location in Idaho Location in the United States
- Location: Blaine County, Idaho
- Coordinates: 43°44′12″N 114°39′37″W
- Type: Glacial
- Primary outflows: Norton Creek to Baker Creek to Big Wood River
- Basin countries: United States
- Max. length: 246 ft (75 m)
- Max. width: 92 ft (28 m)
- Surface area: 1.8 acres (0.73 ha)
- Surface elevation: 9,068 ft (2,764 m)

Little Lost Lake is an alpine lake in Blaine County, Idaho, United States, located in the Smoky Mountains in Sawtooth National Forest. While no trails lead to the lake, it is most easily accessed from the end of forest road 170. The lake is located just east of Prairie Creek Peak. It is also near Smoky Lake, Big Lost Lake, and Upper and Lower Norton lakes.

== See also ==
- List of lakes in Idaho
