= Penny Lake (Portage County, Wisconsin) =

Lake in the state of Wisconsin, United States

- Location within Wisconsin Location within the United States
- Location: Portage County, Wisconsin
- Coordinates: 44°40′12″N 89°16′14″W
- Type: lake
- Basin countries: United States
- Surface elevation: 1,145 ft (349 m)

Penny Lake is a lake in the U.S. state of Wisconsin.

According to tradition, Penny Lake was named after the dog owned by the proprietor of a lakeside resort.
