= Carbonate Mountain (Colorado) =

Mountain in Colorado, United States

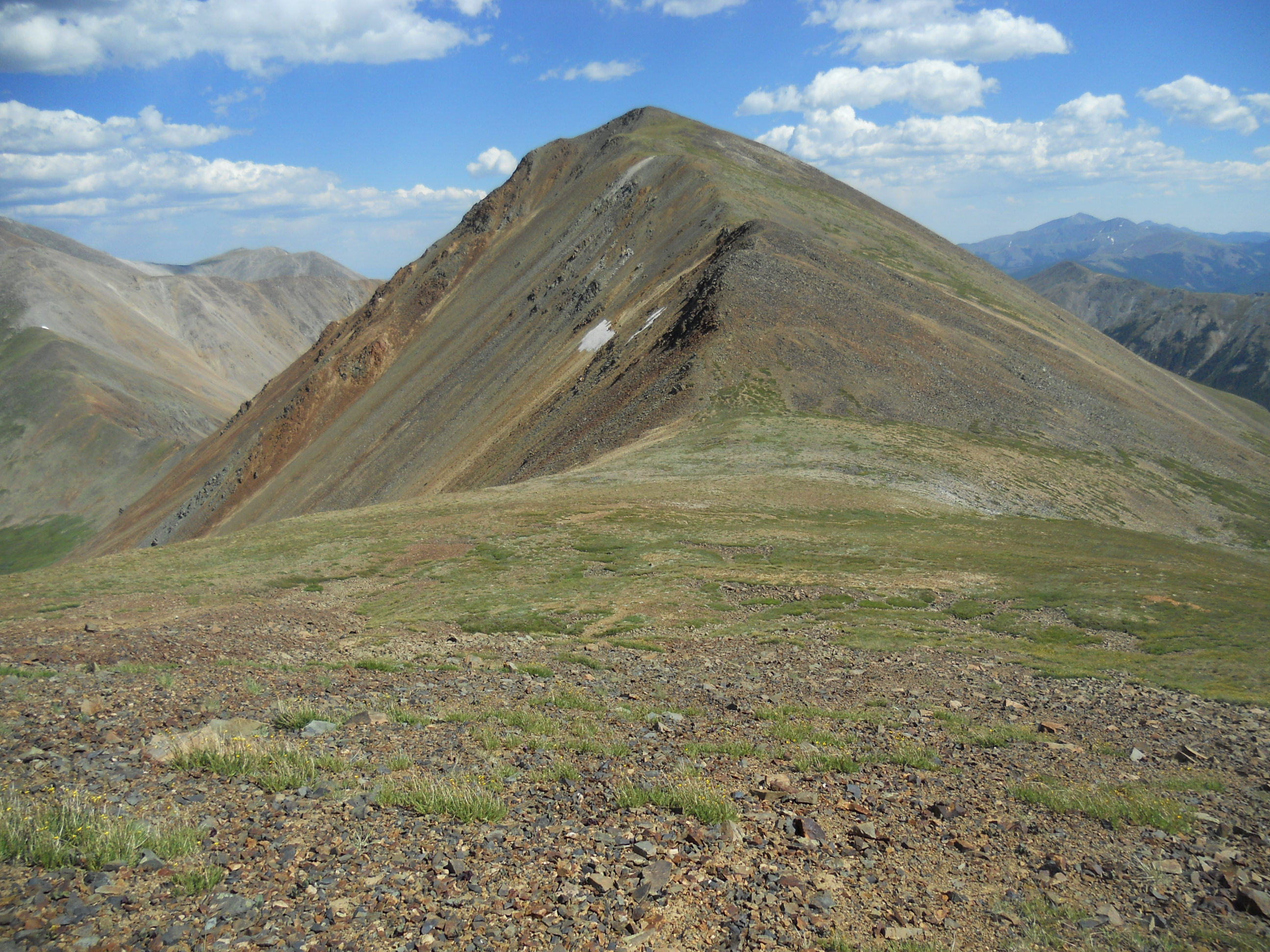
- Carbonate Mountain viewed from the northwest

Highest point
- Elevation: 13,670 ft (4,167 m)
- Prominence: 434 ft (132 m)
- Isolation: 1.88 mi (3.03 km)
- Coordinates: 38°37′40″N 106°17′02″W

Geography
- Location within Colorado
- Location: Chaffee County, Colorado, U.S.
- Parent range: Sawatch Range
- Topo map(s): USGS 7.5' topographic map Saint Elmo, Colorado

Carbonate Mountain is a high mountain summit in the southern Sawatch Range of the Rocky Mountains of North America. The 13,670-foot (4,167 m) thirteener is located in San Isabel National Forest, 5.4 miles (8.7 km) north (bearing 3°) of the community of Garfield in Chaffee County, Colorado, United States.

== See also ==
- List of Colorado mountain ranges
- List of Colorado mountain summits
  - List of Colorado fourteeners
  - List of Colorado 4000 meter prominent summits
  - List of the most prominent summits of Colorado
- List of Colorado county high points
