= Saviers Peak =

Mountain in Idaho, United States

- Location within Idaho

Highest point
- Elevation: 10,441 ft (3,182 m)
- Prominence: 1,761 ft (537 m)
- Coordinates: 43°49′19″N 114°42′47″W

Geography
- Location: Blaine County, Idaho, U.S.
- Parent range: Smoky Mountains
- Topo map: USGS Galena

Saviers Peak, at 10,441 feet (3,182 m) above sea level is the highest peak in the Smoky Mountains of Idaho. Located in Blaine County, Saviers Peak is about 0.5 miles (800 m) north of the Camas County border. The peak is also located in Sawtooth National Recreation Area south of Galena Summit. It is about 0.6 mi (0.97 km) northeast of Camas County Highpoint and 0.6 mi (0.97 km) southeast of Bromaghin Peak.

No trails lead near Saviers Peak, and it is most easily accessed from the north at the Titus Lake trailhead along Idaho State Highway 75.
