= Big Peak (Camas County, Idaho) =

Mountain in the state of Idaho

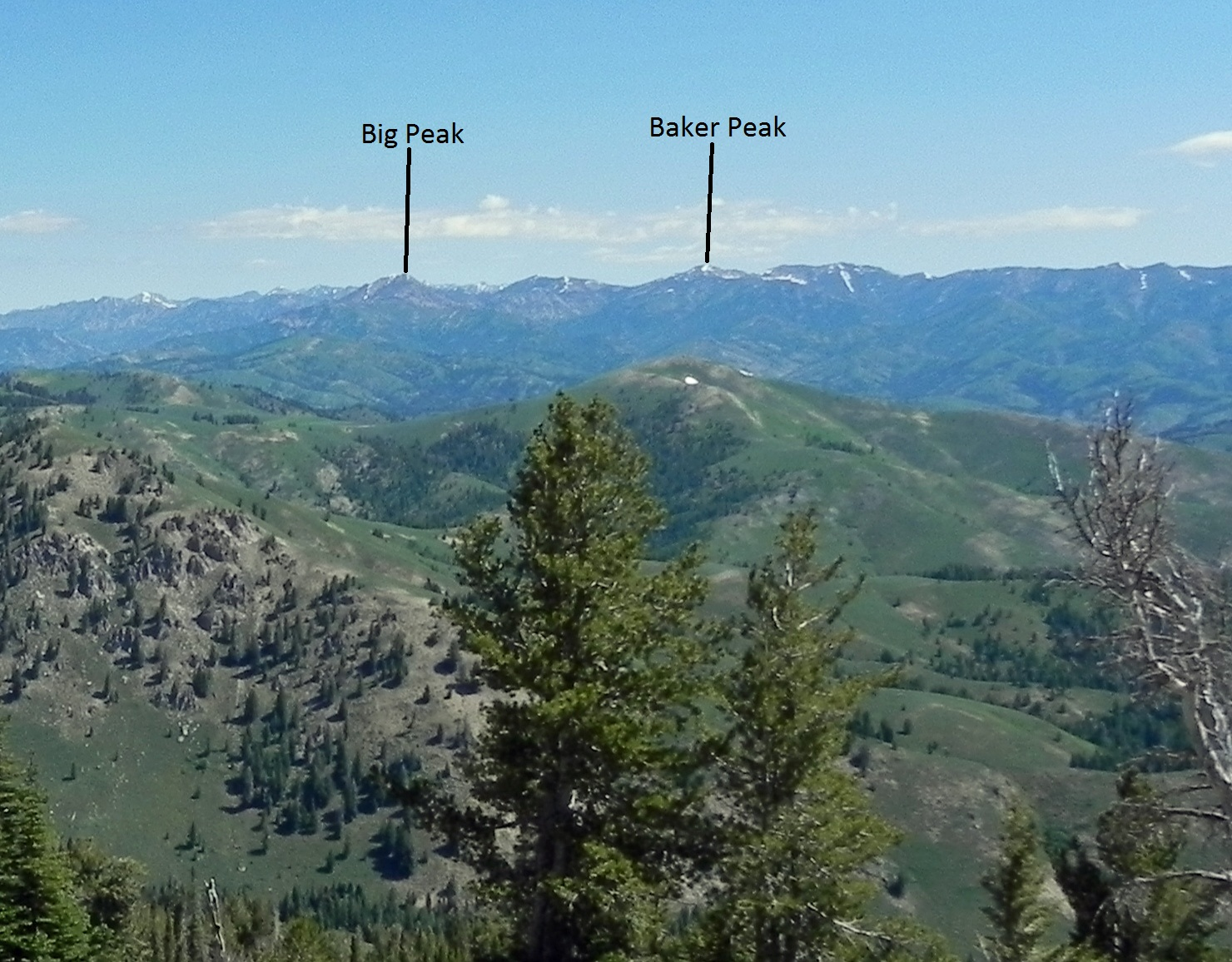
- Big Peak viewed from the Soldier Mountains

Highest point
- Elevation: 10,047 ft (3,062 m)
- Prominence: 987 ft (301 m)
- Coordinates: 43°40′07″N 114°43′43″W

Geography
- Location within Idaho
- Location: Camas County, Idaho, U.S.
- Parent range: Smoky Mountains

Climbing
- Easiest route: Scramble, class 3

Big Peak, at 10,047 feet (3,062 m) above sea level a peak in the Smoky Mountains of Idaho. The peak is located in Sawtooth National Forest in Camas County about 1.5 miles (2.4 km) west of Baker Peak.
