= Baker Peak (Idaho) =

Mountain

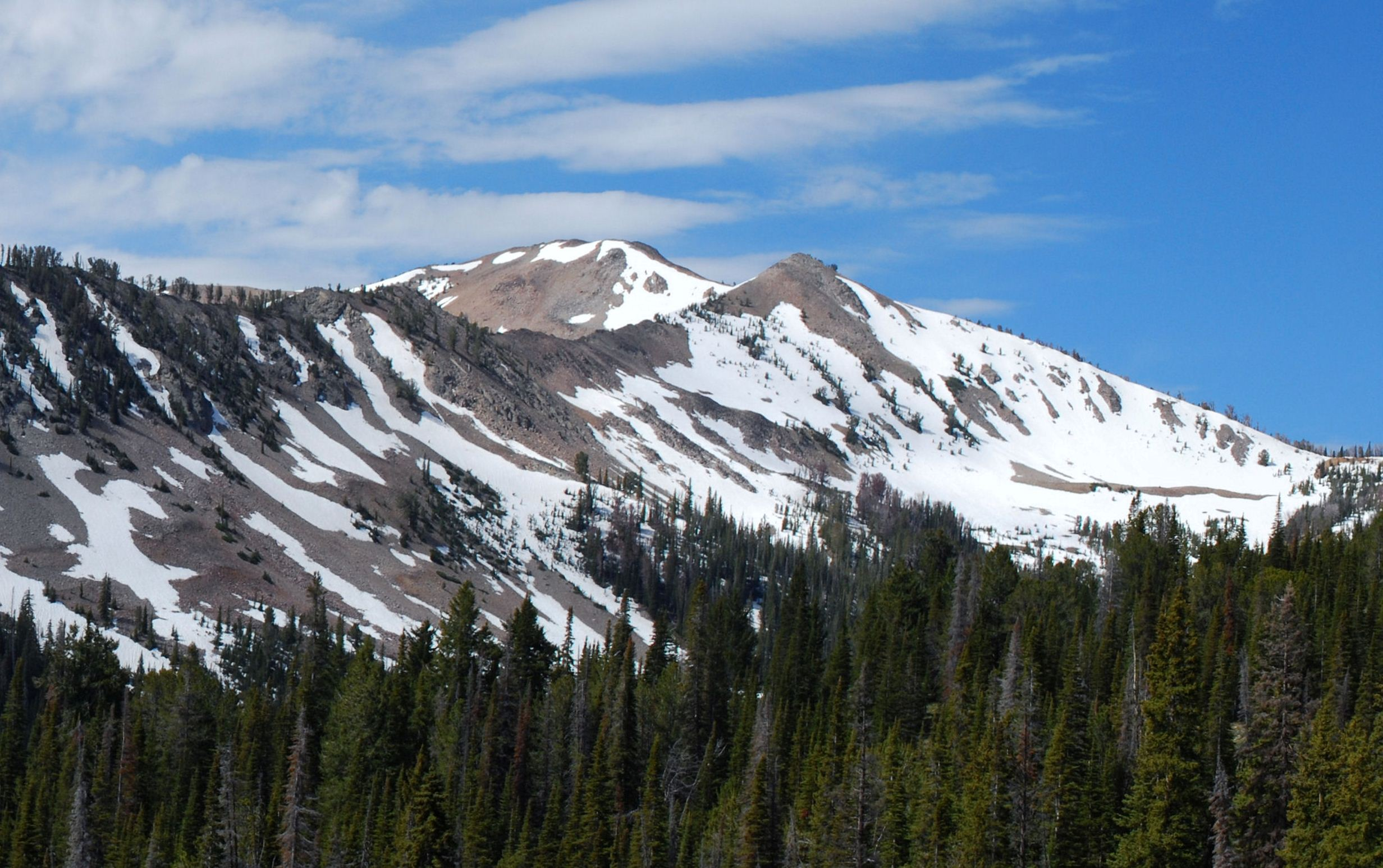
- Baker Peak viewed from the Baker Lake Trail

Highest point
- Elevation: 10,174 ft (3,101 m)
- Prominence: 1,074 ft (327 m)
- Coordinates: 43°40′12″N 114°40′47″W

Geography
- Location within Idaho
- Location: Blaine and Camas counties, Idaho, U.S.
- Parent range: Smoky Mountains
- Topo map: USGS Baker Peak

Climbing
- Easiest route: Simple scramble, class 2

Baker Peak, at 10,174 feet (3,101 m) above sea level, is the fifth-highest peak in the Smoky Mountains of the U.S. state of Idaho. Located in Sawtooth National Forest on the border of Blaine and Camas counties, Baker Peak is about 1.5 miles (2,400 m) east of Big Peak and 1.45 miles (2.33 kilometres) south of Backdrop Peak. It is the 407th-highest peak in Idaho.
