= List of crossings of the Snake River =

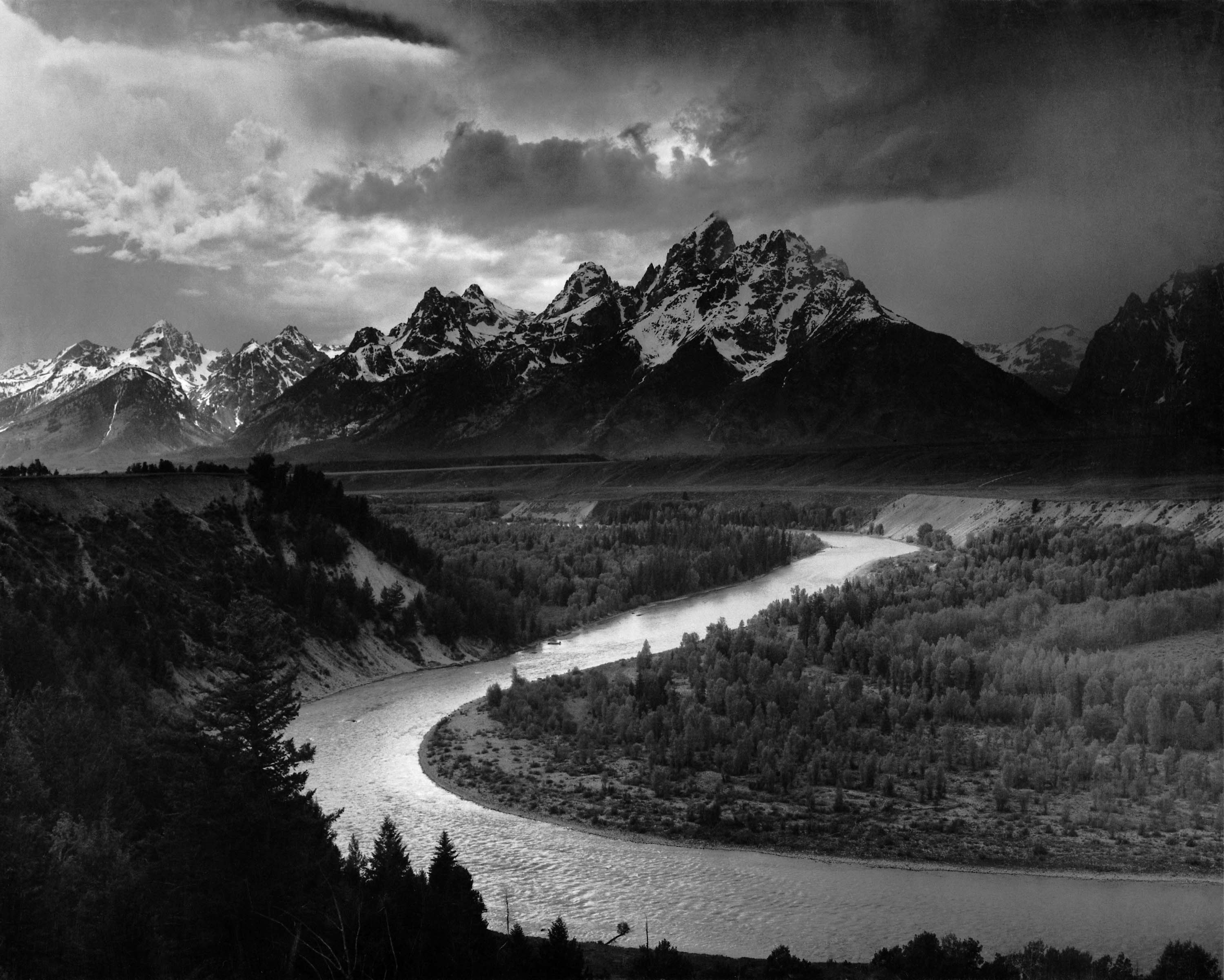
Tetons and Snake River, Ansel Adams, 1942

This is a list of bridges and other crossings of the Snake River, from the Columbia River upstream to its sources. Headwaters of the North Fork are at Big Springs near Island Park, Idaho, while Jackson Lake is at the head of the South Fork. These two forks of the Snake River come together at the base of the Menan Buttes.

== Crossings ==
| Crossing | Carries | Location | Coordinates |
=== Washington ===
| Railroad bridge | Burlington Northern Railroad | Pasco | |
| Vaughn Hubbard Bridge | U.S. Route 12 | Pasco | 46°12′56.68″N 119°1′21.19″W |
| Ice Harbor Lock and Dam | Ice Harbor Road/Monument Drive | Franklin/Walla Walla counties | 46°14′54.61″N 118°52′47.96″W |
| Lower Monumental Dam | Lower Monumental Road | Franklin/Walla Walla counties | 46.5623627°N 118.5374856°W |
| Railroad bridge | Union Pacific Railroad | Lyons Ferry, Franklin/Walla Walla counties | 46°35′36.79″N 118°13′42.64″W |
| Lyons Ferry Bridge | State Route 261 | Lyons Ferry, Franklin/Columbia counties | 46°35′22.88″N 118°13′9.89″W |
| Railroad bridge | Union Pacific Railroad | Whitman/Columbia counties | 46°33′53.97″N 118°10′56.83″W |
| Little Goose Lock and Dam | Little Goose Dam Road | Whitman/Columbia counties | 46°35′7.17″N 118°1′37.91″W |
| Elmer Huntley Bridge | State Route 127 | Central Ferry State Park, Whitman/Garfield counties | 46°37′33.85″N 117°47′53.75″W |
| Lower Granite Lock and Dam | Almota Road | Whitman/Garfield counties | 46°39′37.84″N 117°25′42.23″W |
| Red Wolf Crossing | State Route 128 | Clarkston | 46°25′28.37″N 117°4′18.38″W |
=== Washington - Idaho ===
| Interstate Highway Bridge | U.S. Route 12 | Clarkston, Washington–Lewiston, Idaho | 46°25′13.67″N 117°2′9.53″W |
| Southway Bridge | Fleshman Way (Clarkston)– Bryden Canyon Road (Lewiston) | Clarkston, Washington–Lewiston, Idaho | 46°23′44.51″N 117°2′26.99″W |
=== Oregon - Idaho ===
| Hells Canyon Dam | Local access road | Wallowa County, Oregon–Adams County, Idaho | 45°14′34.86″N 116°42′6.4″W |
| Oxbow Bridge | Local access road | Oxbow, Oregon–Adams County, Idaho | 44°58′30.87″N 116°51′21.11″W |
| Oxbow Dam | Local access road | Baker County, Oregon–Adams County, Idaho | 44°58′14.56″N 116°50′8.07″W |
| Baker-Adams Bridge | Brownlee-Oxbow Highway (Oregon) – Idaho State Highway 71 | Baker County, Oregon–Adams County, Idaho | 44°50′42.79″N 116°53′49.89″W |
| Brownlee Dam | No road | Baker County, Oregon–Adams County, Idaho | 44°50′11.93″N 116°54′5.3″W |
| Baker Railroad Bridge | Railroad | Baker County, Oregon–Washington County, Idaho | 44°21′48″N 117°14′20″W |
| Weiser Bridge | US 95 Spur | Baker County, Oregon-Weiser, Idaho | 44°14′40″N 116°58′47″W |
| Payette Bridge | State Highway 52 | Malheur County, Oregon-Payette, Idaho | 44°05′57″N 116°56′54″W |
| Railroad bridge | | Ontario, Oregon-Payette County, Idaho | 44°02′04″N 116°57′22″W |
| IOntario Bridge | U.S. Route 30 | Ontario, Oregon-Fruitland, Idaho | 44°01′30″N 116°56′10″W |
| Devo Bridge | Interstate 84 | Ontario, Oregon-Fruitland, Idaho | 44°00′25″N 116°56′29″W |
| Nyssa Bridge | U.S. Route 20, U.S. Route 26 | Nyssa, Oregon-Payette County, Idaho | 43°52′37″N 116°58′57″W |
| Railroad bridge | Union Pacific Railroad | Nyssa, Oregon-Payette County, Idaho | 43°51′50″N 116°59′38.5″W |
=== Oregon ===
| Adrian Bridge | Roswell Road | Adrian | 43°43′51″N 117°03′57″W |
=== Idaho ===
| Bridge | U.S. Route 95, State Highway 19 | Homedale | 43°37′16.5″N 116°55′45.0″W |
| Bridge | State Highway 55 | Marsing-Huston | 43°32′53″N 116°47′58″W |
| Bridge | State Highway 45 | Owyhee County-Canyon County | 43°20′31″N 116°36′08″W |
| Bridge | State Highway 167 | Grand View, Idaho | 42°59′44″N 116°06′18″W |
| C.J. Strike Dam | | Owyhee County-Elmore County | 42°56′54″N 115°58′36″W |
| Bridge | State Highway 51 | Bruneau-Elmore County | 42°56′18″N 115°45′03″W |
| Bridge | State Highway 78 | Hammett | 42°56′32″N 115°29′36″W |
| Bridge | Interstate 84, U.S. Route 26, U.S. Route 30 | Glenns Ferry | 42°57′07″N 115°17′21″W |
| Bridge | Interstate 84, U.S. Route 26, U.S. Route 30 | Glenns Ferry | 42°57′10″N 115°10′11″W |
| Bliss Dam | service road | Twin Falls County - Gooding County | 42°54′49″N 115°04′14″W |
| Dam | | Hagerman | 42°50′31″N 114°54′14″W |
| Bridge | U.S. Route 30 | Hagerman | 42°45′25″N 114°52′25″W |
| Bridge | Clear Lakes Lane | Twin Falls County - Gooding County | 42°40′15″N 114°45′35″W |
| Bridge | Blue Lakes Grade Road | Twin Falls | 42°36′24″N 114°28′32″W |
| Perrine Bridge | U.S. Route 93 | Twin Falls | 42°36′01″N 114°27′14″W |
| Hansen Bridge | State Highway 50 | Twin Falls | 42°34′00″N 114°18′03″W |
| Bridge | local road | Murtaugh | 42°29′58″N 114°09′08″W |
| Bridge | local road | Burley | 42°31′42″N 114°00′51″W |
| Milner Dam | service road | Burley | 42°31′31″N 114°00′35″W |
| Bridge | State Highway 27 | Burley - Heyburn | 42°32′17″N 113°48′29″W |
| Railroad bridge | | Burley - Heyburn | 42°32′54″N 113°45′53″W |
| Bridge | U.S. Route 30 | Burley - Heyburn | 42°32′42″N 113°45′51″W |
| Bridge | Interstate 84, U.S. Route 30 | Cassia County- Minidoka County | 42°34′08″N 113°37′46″W |
| Bridge | State Highway 25 | Cassia County- Minidoka County | 42°34′52″N 113°37′35″W |
| Bridge | Baseline Road | Cassia County- Minidoka County | 42°37′10″N 113°35′15″W |
| Minidoka Dam | no road | Cassia County- Minidoka County | 42°40′08″N 113°29′04″W |
| Railroad bridge | Oregon Short Line Railroad | American Falls | 42°46′38″N 112°52′32″W |
| Bridge | State Highway 39 (South) | American Falls | 42°46′42″N 112°52′32″W |
| American Falls Dam | State Highway 39 (North) | American Falls | 42°46′43″N 112°52′32″W |
| Bridge | local road | Pingree | |
| Bridge | local road | Blackfoot | |
| Railroad bridge | | Blackfoot | |
| Bridge | U.S. Route 26 | Blackfoot | 43°11′58″N 112°21′56″W |
| Bridge | Interstate 15 | Blackfoot | 43°13′20″N 112°20′36″W |
eastern Idaho
| Railroad bridge | Union Pacific Railroad | Idaho Falls | |
| Bridge | John's Hole | Idaho Falls | |
| Bridge | U.S. Route 20(Broadway Street) | Idaho Falls | |
| Railroad bridge | Eastern Idaho Railroad | Idaho Falls | |
| Bridge | Pancheri Drive | Idaho Falls | |
| Bridge | | Idaho Falls | |
| Palisades Dam | | Swan Valley | |
| Bridge | | Swan Valley | |
=== Wyoming ===
| Jackson Lake Dam | Teton Park Road | Grand Teton National Park | 43°51′27.53″N 110°35′22.34″W |
