= Idaho State Highway 167 =

State highway in Idaho, United States

State Highway 167
- SH-167 highlighted in red

Route information
- Maintained by ITD
- Length: 16.319 mi (26.263 km)

Major junctions
- South end: SH-78 in Grand View
- North end: SH-67 near Mountain Home AFB

Location
- Country: United States
- State: Idaho
- Counties: Owyhee, Elmore

Highway system
- Idaho State Highway System; Interstate; US; State
← SH-162	→ SH-200

State Highway 167 (SH-167) is a state highway in Idaho from SH-78 in Grand View to SH-67 near Mountain Home Air Force Base.

== Route description ==
SH-167 starts at the intersection with SH-78 in Grand View. As Roosevelt Avenue, the two-lane road travels north through Grand View and becomes Grandview Road when it crosses the Snake River into Elmore County. SH-167 provides access to the Simplot feed lot, the U.S. Air Force recreation area at C.J. Strike Dam, and properties on Simco Road as it continues north, and along the westernmost side of the base until the intersection with SH-67, about 1.5 miles (2.4 km) north of the base's main gate.

== History ==
SH-167 was originally part of SH-67. The history of these roads goes back to at least the 1930s, when the first all-weather gravel road connecting Grand View and Mountain Home was built (represented by today's SH-167, SH-67 and SH-51), and can be seen on a 1937 map of the area. When Idaho expanded SH-67 to four lanes for base-bound traffic, the segment south to Grand View was delisted and unsigned from the official state highway system, yet was still maintained by the Idaho Transportation Department (ITD), and still referred to in the milepoint log as "(SH-67)" twice.

The highway has since been relisted as SH-167, noting its heritage as part of the original SH-67.

== Major junctions ==
County	Location	mi	km	Destinations	Notes
Owyhee	Grand View	0.000	0.000	SH-78 – Marsing, Bruneau	
Elmore		16.305– 16.319	26.240– 26.263	SH-67 – Mountain Home AFB, Mountain Home	
1.000 mi = 1.609 km; 1.000 km = 0.621 mi

== See also ==
- List of state highways in Idaho
- List of highways numbered 167
