= Idaho State Highway 51 =

State highway in southwestern Idaho from Mountain Home south to the Nevada border

State Highway 51
- SH-51 highlighted in red

Route information
- Maintained by ITD
- Length: 93.598 mi (150.631 km)

Major junctions
- South end: SR 225 near Owyhee, NV
- SH-78 near Bruneau; SH-67 near Mountain Home
- North end: I-84 BL in Mountain Home

Location
- Country: United States
- State: Idaho
- Counties: Owyhee, Elmore

Highway system
- Idaho State Highway System; Interstate; US; State
← SH-50	→ SH-52

State Highway 51 (SH-51) is a state highway in southwestern Idaho from Mountain Home south to the Nevada border, where it continues as State Route 225 to Elko. It is the major north–south road in Owyhee County.

As currently configured in the state's official milepoint log, SH-51 terminates at the Business Loop 84 intersection with American Legion Boulevard, and is not otherwise officially concurrent/overlaid with BL-84 (where the signs at I-84's Exits 90 and 95 say "To SH-51/To SH-67") or the former section of US-20 that follows American Legion Boulevard to Interstate 84/U.S. Route 20 east at Exit 95. As of February 2015, some map products such as Google Maps still show SH-51's former overlay with American Legion Boulevard.

== Route description ==
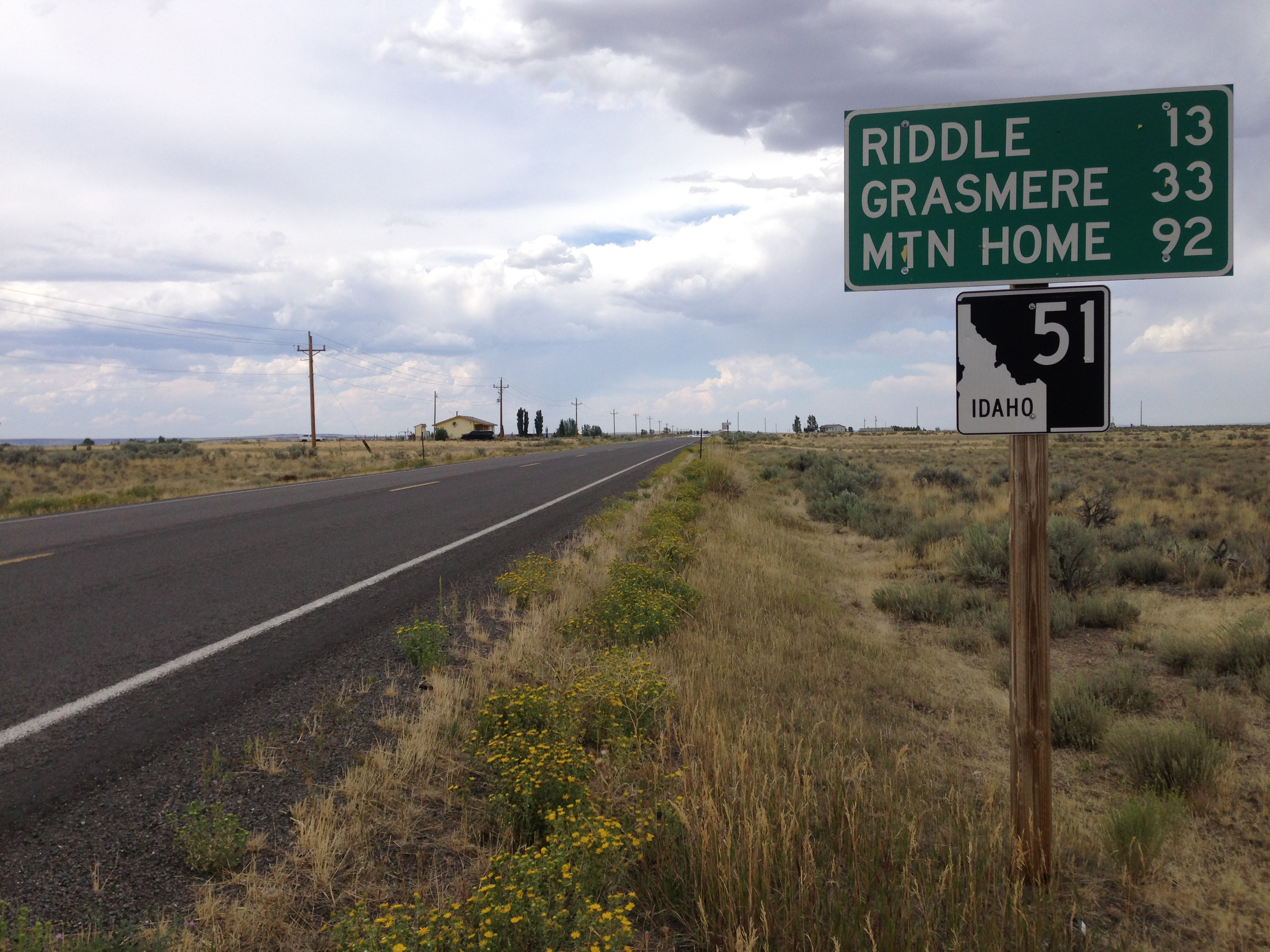
View north from the south end of SH-51

SH-51's northern terminus is in the city of Mountain Home in Elmore County. After turning south from Airbase Rd. and the intersection with SH-67, the road crosses the Snake River into Owyhee County and passes through the towns of Bruneau, Grasmere, and Riddle. About 11.5 miles (18.5 km) from the state border it enters the Duck Valley Indian Reservation.

As the road crosses into Nevada it becomes State Route 225. The reservation's only major town, Owyhee is about 4 miles (6.4 km) south of the state border. After another 95 miles (153 km) through Elko County, SR 225 connects with Interstate 80 in Elko.

== History ==
The basic route of today's SH-51 was in place as early as the 1930s, mostly as an all-weather gravel road from Mountain Home until it reached the northern boundary of the Duck Valley Indian Reservation, and as an unimproved road on through to the Nevada border and then-NV Route 11 as of the 1937 map.

== Major intersections ==
County	Location	mi	km	Destinations	Notes
Owyhee	Duck Valley Indian Reservation	0.000	0.000	SR 225 south to I-80 – Owyhee, Elko, Reno	Southern terminus of SH-51
Owyhee	Duck Valley Indian Reservation	1.458	2.346	BIA Road 7	
Owyhee	Duck Valley Indian Reservation	2.925	4.707	BIA Road 8	
Owyhee	Duck Valley Indian Reservation	7.260	11.684	BIA Road 211	
Owyhee		69.715– 69.916	112.195– 112.519	SH-78 west – Grand View, Marsing	Western end of SH-78 overlap
Owyhee		76.582	123.247	SH-78 east – Bruneau Dunes State Park, Hammett	Eastern end of SH-78 overlap
Snake River		76.979	123.886	Snake River bridge; Owyhee–Elmore county Line	
Elmore	Mountain Home	88.294	142.095	West 36th Street South	Old Grandview Road
Elmore	Mountain Home	90.785	146.104	SH-67 west – Mountain Home AFB, Grand View	
Elmore	Mountain Home	91.948– 93.598	147.976– 150.631	I-84 BL – Boise, Glenns Ferry, Twin Falls	Overlap on I-84 Bus. (old US-26/30) to official northern terminus at American Legion Blvd. (old US-20)
1.000 mi = 1.609 km; 1.000 km = 0.621 mi: Concurrency terminus

== Elevation ==
Elevation on the highway ranges from a low of 2461 feet (750 m) above sea level at the Snake River crossing,
to a high of 5400 feet (1646 m) at the Nevada border.

Location	Milepost	Elevation	GNIS Feature ID	(GNIS search)
Mountain Home	92	3146' - 959 m	374044	43°07′23″N 115°41′32″W
C.J. Strike Reservoir (Snake River)	76.98	2461' - 750 m	398659	42°56′54″N 115°58′30″W
Bruneau	71.49	2549' - 777 m	396181	42°52′50″N 115°47′50″W
Grasmere	32.50	5089' - 1551 m	376052	42°22′36″N 115°52′57″W
Riddle	13.49	5367' - 1636 m	398043	42°11′13″N 116°06′37″W
Miller Creek Settlement	6.0	5325' - 1623 m	396897	42°04′54″N 116°07′41″W
Owyhee, Nevada	(0)	5400' - 1646 m	842663	41°56′52″N 116°05′55″W
