= Idaho State Highway 67 =

State highway in Idaho, United States

State Highway 67
- SH-67 highlighted in red

Route information
- Maintained by ITD
- Length: 8.948 mi (14.400 km)

Major junctions
- West end: Mountain Home AFB Main Gate
- SH-167
- East end: SH-51 in Mountain Home

Location
- Country: United States
- State: Idaho
- Counties: Elmore

Highway system
- Idaho State Highway System; Interstate; US; State
← SH-66	→ SH-69

State Highway 67 (SH-67) is a state highway in Elmore County, Idaho. It connects the Mountain Home Air Force Base to SH-51 in the city of Mountain Home.

== Route description ==
SH-67 begins at the main entrance of the Mountain Home Air Force Base, located in southwestern Elmore County. The five-lane highway, named Airbase Road, travels due north from the base entrance to a junction with Grand View Road (signed as SH-167). From the junction, SH-67 turns northeast and travels through a section of the Morley Nelson Snake River Birds of Prey National Conservation Area in the barren outskirts of Mountain Home as a four-lane, undivided highway. The highway then enters the city of Mountain Home and turns east before passing a municipal airport. SH-67 terminates at an intersection with SH-51 near the east end of the airport, located approximately 5 miles (8.0 km) west of an interchange with Interstate 84. Except for a brief divided section at the intersection with SH-167, the entire highway is four-lane non-divided, with center lane-left turn only areas where needed.

== History ==
The history of SH-67 goes back to at least the 1930s, when the first all-weather gravel road connecting Grand View and Mountain Home was built (represented by today's SH-167, SH-67 and SH-51), and can be seen on a 1937 map of the area. A road from this road to the site of the base has existed since at least November 1942, when base construction began.

The route received its current number designation in the late 1960s in honor of the base's then-host unit, the 67th Tactical Reconnaissance Wing (1965-1971).

The original SH-67 also included the entirety of SH-167 from Grand View to where it currently intersects with SH-67 approximately 1.5 miles (2.4 km) from the base's main gate.

In order to improve the base's prospects to remain open during a round of base closures in the 1970s, Idaho's legislature voted to expand the highway to the base to four lanes, although it was an area noted for gusty winds and tumbling tumbleweeds and little else. The expansion project also realigned the highway to go directly to the base's main gate. The unexpanded two-lane section of SH-67 that passed to the west of the base was delisted and unsigned (even though it was still officially maintained by ITD for the Simplot feed lot and the base's recreation area at C. J. Strike Dam just north of the Snake River) prior to its redesignation as SH-167.

== Major intersections ==
The entire highway is in Elmore County.

Location	mi	km	Destinations	Notes
Mountain Home AFB	0.000	0.000	Main Gate	
	1.186– 1.773	1.909– 2.853	SH-167 – Grand View, C. J. Strike Dam	Originally part of SH-67
Mountain Home	8.948	14.400	SH-51 / Elmcrest Road – Mountain Home, Boise, Bruneau, Grasmere	
1.000 mi = 1.609 km; 1.000 km = 0.621 mi

== See also ==
- List of state highways in Idaho
