= Idaho State Highway 78 =

State highway in Idaho, United States

State Highway 78
- SH-78 highlighted in red

Route information
- Maintained by ITD
- Length: 99.720 mi (160.484 km)

Major junctions
- West end: SH-55 in Marsing
- SH-45 near Walters Ferry; SH-167 near Grand View; SH-51 near Bruneau
- East end: I-84 BL in Hammett

Location
- Country: United States
- State: Idaho
- Counties: Owyhee, Elmore

Highway system
- Idaho State Highway System; Interstate; US; State
← SH-77	→ SH-79

State Highway 78 (SH-78) is a state highway in Idaho from SH-55 in Marsing to I-84 Business Loop in Hammett

== Route description ==
SH-78 starts at the intersection with SH-55 in Marsing and provides access to sites south of the Snake River from there to Bruneau and a few along the north side via SH-167 from Grand View. SH-78 provides access to Bruneau Dunes State Park and itself crosses the Snake into Elmore County before reaching its eastern terminus at Hammett.

== History ==
The basic route of today's SH-78 from Marsing to Bruneau was in place as early as the mid-1930s, mostly as unimproved roads with a few all-weather gravel segments near Bruneau, Grand View and north of Murphy (a segment originally part of SH-45), and some paved segments near Marsing as of the 1937 map.

== Major junctions ==
County	Location	mi	km	Destinations	Notes
Owyhee	Marsing	0.000	0.000	SH-55 – Marsing, Nampa, Boise, Eagle	US-95 is about 2 miles (3.2 km) south on SH-55
Owyhee		19.775	31.825	SH-45 north – Nampa	
Owyhee	Murphy	34.105	54.887	Silver City Road	National historic mining district and former Owyhee County seat about 25 miles (40 km) south
Owyhee	Grand View	59.782	96.210	SH-167 north – Mountain Home AFB, Mountain Home	Access to Simplot feed lot, USAF Recreation Area at C. J. Strike Dam, Simco Road
Owyhee		76.004	122.317	SH-51 south – Grasmere, Elko	Southern end of SH-51 overlap
Owyhee	Bruneau	82.680	133.061	SH-51 north – Mountain Home	Northern end of SH-51 overlap
Owyhee	Bruneau	84.360	135.764	Bruneau Dunes State Park	protected sand dunes
Snake River		94.664	152.347	Snake River Bridge; Owyhee–Elmore county line	
Elmore	Hammett	98.640– 99.720	158.746– 160.484	I-84 BL – Mountain Home, Boise, Twin Falls	Overlap with I-84 Bus.
1.000 mi = 1.609 km; 1.000 km = 0.621 mi: Concurrency terminus
