= Rattlesnake Station =

Historical American stagecoach station

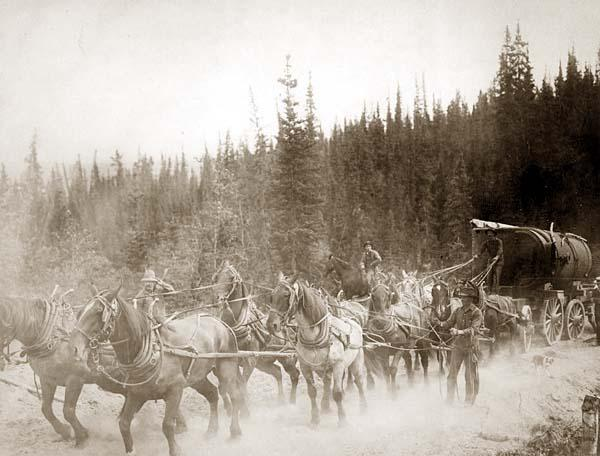
- Horse team on the Overland Trail

General information
- Location: northeast of Mountain Home, Idaho
- Coordinates: 43°11′53″N 115°33′17″W
- System: Stagecoach
- Owner: Ben Holladay
- Line: Overland Stage Line
- Connections: Salt Lake City, Walla Walla

History
- Opened: 1864
- Closed: 1914
- Former names: Mountain Home Post Office

Services
U.S. Post Office, Passengers
Location

Rattlesnake Station was a stagecoach station northeast of Mountain Home, Idaho, and the original site of the Mountain Home post office. Approximately seven miles from exit 95 on Interstate 84 in present-day Elmore County, a historical marker located at milepost 102.7 on U.S. Route 20 commemorates its location. The highway follows Rattlesnake Creek and the elevation of the site at the base of the grade is 3,820 feet (1,164 m) above sea level.

== History ==
Rattlesnake Station was established in 1864 by Ben Holladay as a stop on his new Overland Stage Line between Salt Lake City, Utah, and Walla Walla, Washington.

The Overland line was acquired by the Northwestern Stage Company in 1870, which made the station a stop for its weekly stage line from Boise to the South Boise mines and an overnight stop in 1875.

A post office named "Mountain Home" was established in 1876 at Rattlesnake Station. Fire destroyed several station buildings on October 12, 1878, but were rebuilt and continued to serve stages until 1914, when the route was abandoned. The post office was moved, dragged by mule teams, to the present location of Mountain Home in 1883, about 8 miles (13 km) southwest, to be closer to the recently completed Oregon Short Line Railroad.
