= Riddle, Idaho =

Unincorporated community in the state of Idaho, United States

- Unincorporated community
- Location within the state of Idaho Riddle, Idaho (the United States)
- Coordinates: 42°11′13″N 116°06′37″W
- Country: United States
- State: Idaho
- County: Owyhee
- Elevation: 5,367 ft (1,636 m)
- Time zone: UTC-7 (Mountain (MST))
  - Summer (DST): UTC-6 (MDT)
- ZIP codes: 83604
- Area code: 208
- GNIS feature ID: 398043

Riddle (Shoshoni language: Yakwahnim Paa) is an unincorporated community in the southwestern part of the U.S. state of Idaho, in Owyhee County. Located on SH-51, it is 13 miles (21 km) north of the border with Nevada and 79 miles (127 km) south of Mountain Home. The community lies at the north edge of the Duck Valley Indian Reservation.

The community has the name of the local Riddle family.

In 2000, the average median household income for the ZIP Code Tabulation Area that includes Grasmere and Riddle was $30,921. Riddle's elevation is 5,367 feet (1,636 m) above sea level.

Riddle was the fictional location for the beginning and end of the film Vanishing Point (1997 remake).
