= Dixie, Idaho =

Dixie, Idaho may refer to:

- Dixie, Elmore County, Idaho, an unincorporated community
- Dixie, Idaho County, Idaho, an unincorporated community
