= Wilson, Idaho =

Unincorporated community in the Ada County, Idaho, United States

- Unincorporated community
- Location within Idaho Location within the United States
- Coordinates: 43°21′41″N 116°39′10″W
- Country: United States
- State: Idaho
- County: Owyhee
- Elevation: 2,330 ft (710 m)
- Time zone: UTC-7 (Mountain (MST))
  - Summer (DST): UTC-6 (MDT)
- ZIP Code: 83641
- Area codes: 208, 986
- GNIS feature ID: 399717

Wilson is an unincorporated community in Owyhee County, Idaho, United States, roughly 25 miles (40 km) south-southwest of Nampa. Wilson is located along Idaho State Highway 78.
