= Elmore County Courthouse (Idaho) =

- U.S. National Register of Historic Places
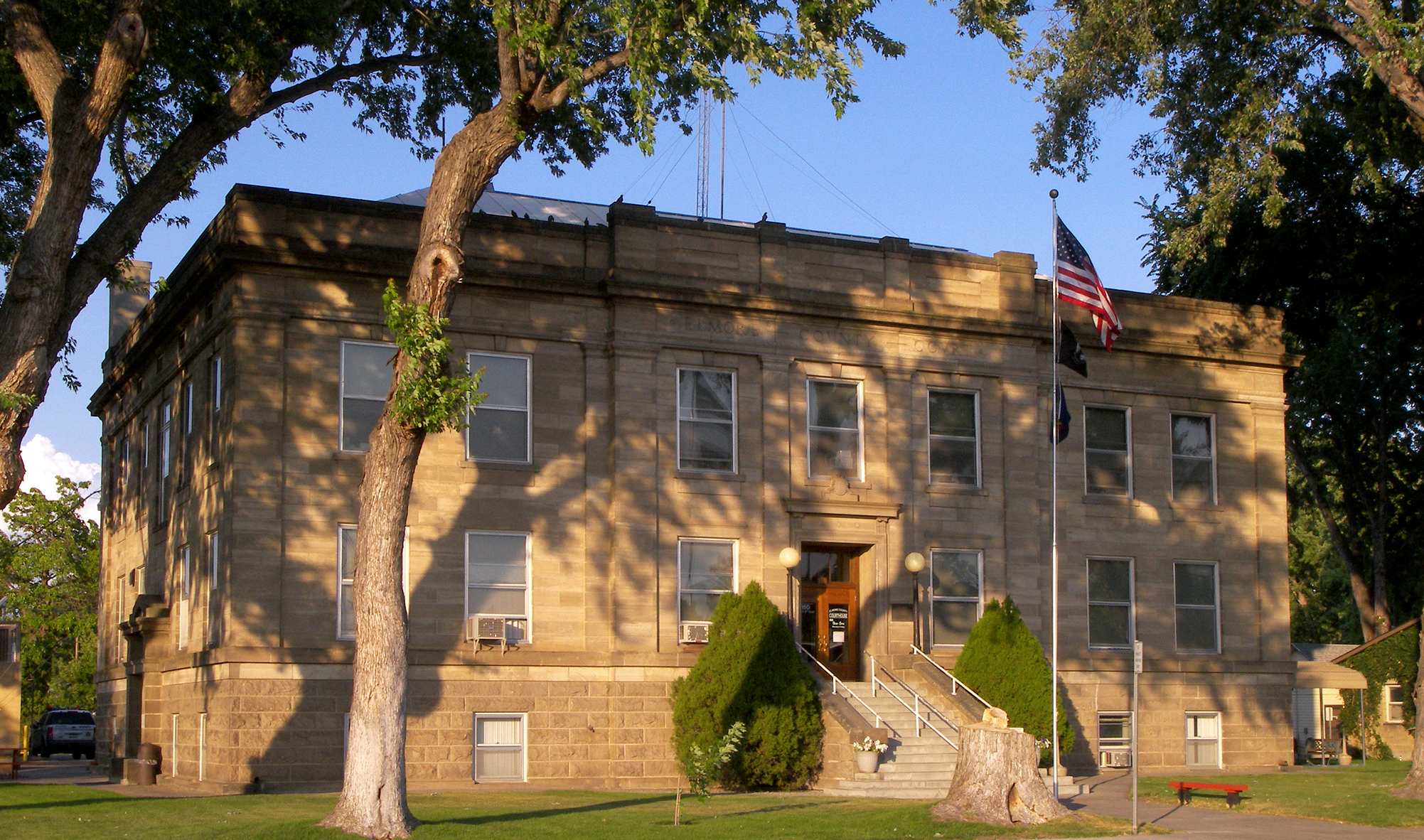
- The courthouse in 2009

- Location within Idaho Location within the United States
- Location: 150 South Fourth E, Mountain Home, Idaho
- Coordinates: 43°06′49″N 114°34′48″W
- Area: less than one acre
- Built: 1916
- Architect: Wayland & Fennell
- Architectural style: Classical Revival
- MPS: County Courthouses in Idaho MPS
- NRHP reference No.: 87001584
- Added to NRHP: September 22, 1987

The Elmore County Courthouse is a historic building in Mountain Home, Idaho, and the courthouse of Elmore County, Idaho. It was built in 1916 by C. E. Johnson with sandstone from Boise, and it was designed in the Classical Revival style by Wayland & Fennell. The construction was completed 17 years after the establishment of Elmore County. It has been listed on the National Register of Historic Places since September 22, 1987.
