= Charlotte Lamberton =

American deaf dancer

- Born: Frances Charlotte Lamberton; October 6, 1917; Idaho, U.S.
- Other names: Charlotte Frances Lamberton, Charlotte Drolet (married name)
- Spouse: Edwin Drolet

Frances Charlotte Lamberton (born October 6, 1917) was an American deaf vaudeville and ballroom dancer.

== Biography ==
Charlotte Lamberton was born in Idaho to Ethel (née Clark) Lamberton and Frank Lamberton, an insurance broker. At age 2, the family lived in Mountain Home, Idaho. She had two brothers, Henry (Charles) and Jack who was killed in a train accident in 1931. Both Charlotte and Charles were born deaf. They were not allowed to learn sign language but instead were homeschooled in oralism by their mother and attended Los Angeles Day School for the Deaf. Both learned to speak and sign as they got older.

Charlotte took dancing lessons starting at five years old because her mother wanted to "make [her] normal like other kids. She would often dance with her brother Charles but when he became a teenager he was diagnosed with a weak heart and Charlotte mostly danced alone. The family moved to Southern California and she started performing professionally in Hollywood when she was eleven. By 1930, the family lived in Long Beach. When she was fourteen, she was being billed in stage shows as "The Exquisite Charlotte."

Lamberton was booked for two weeks at the Hollywood Restaurant in New York which turned into a 28-week engagement. Charles, who had received a clean bill of health, joined her and they went on tour starring in Dave Apollon's Revue, touring the country and gaining national fame. Charles stopped dancing in 1940 again due to declining health and then to join the war effort. Charlotte later performed alone, and claimed to be "the only solo dancer in the country without the sense of hearing."

When asked how she could dance to music she could not hear, Lamberton explained "Do I feel it through my feet? No but that's what everyone asks. I feel it through my arms, my legs, my body. It comes to me in a faint sort of pulsation, in rhythmic beats that are like waves... Oh I can't explain it!"

Lamberton's last show was in Alaska in 1948, where she was on a four-month tour. She left show business to take care of her mother, who always accompanied her professionally. Lamberton's mother died of cancer in August 1948. She married Edwin Drolet on October 3, 1948, and they moved to Detroit, Michigan. He died of cancer in 1977.
