= Dixie, Elmore County, Idaho =

Unincorporated community in the state of Idaho, United States

Dixie, Idaho
- Unincorporated community
- Location within Idaho Location within the United States
- Coordinates: 43°19′02″N 115°26′49″W
- Country: United States
- State: Idaho
- County: Elmore
- Elevation: 4,761 ft (1,451 m)
- Time zone: UTC-7 (Mountain (MST))
  - Summer (DST): UTC-6 (MDT)
- Area codes: 208, 986
- GNIS feature ID: 396406

Dixie is an unincorporated community in Elmore County, Idaho, United States. Dixie is 18 miles (29 km) northeast of Mountain Home.

== History ==
Dixie's population was 25 in 1909.
