= Idaho State Highway 45 =

State highway in Idaho

State Highway 45
- SH-45 highlighted in red

Route information
- Maintained by ITD
- Length: 17.839 mi (28.709 km)

Major junctions
- South end: SH-78 near Walters Ferry
- North end: I-84 BL in Nampa

Location
- Country: United States
- State: Idaho
- Counties: Owyhee, Canyon

Highway system
- Idaho State Highway System; Interstate; US; State
← SH-44	→ SH-46

State Highway 45 (SH-45) is a 17.985-mile-long (28.944 km) state highway in Idaho. It runs from SH-78 to Interstate 84 Business (I-84 Bus.) in Nampa.

== Route description ==
SH-45 begins at an intersection with SH-78 before crossing the Snake River and heading northeast. The highway continues north into the city of Nampa as 12th Avenue Road, passing by Mercy Medical Center and Northwest Nazarene University. Then, SH-45 turns northeast on 12th Avenue before forming a one-way couplet with 11th Avenue before ending at 2nd Street South. The highway is a major freight corridor.

== History ==
In 2011, the Nampa Development Corporation requested a realignment of SH-45 to redirect freight traffic away from downtown Nampa. The city government began studying a realignment in 2021 that would use one of several existing roads that lead to I-84 from the south side of downtown Nampa.

== Major intersections ==
County	Location	mi	km	Destinations	Notes
Owyhee		0.000	0.000	SH-78 – Murphy, Marsing	
Owyhee		0.366	0.589	SH-45 Conn.	
Snake River		0.688– 0.819	1.107– 1.318	New Cleo's Ferry Bridge	
Canyon	Nampa	17.839	28.709	I-84 BL (2nd Street, 11th Avenue) – Caldwell, Boise	
1.000 mi = 1.609 km; 1.000 km = 0.621 mi

== Connector route ==
State Highway 45 Connector
- Location: Near the Snake River
- Length: 0.250 mi (402 m)

State Highway 45 Connector (SH-45 Conn.) is a short route connecting SH-78 and SH-45.
