= Mountain Home School District 193 =

School district in Idaho, US

Mountain Home School District 193 is a school district headquartered in Mountain Home, Idaho.

Located in Elmore County, the district includes Mountain Home and Mountain Home Air Force Base.

== History ==
Jack Jones began working for the Mountain Home district in 1971 and became the superintendent. In 1978 the board of trustees reassigned Jones to three different positions and increased his salary, and another individual became acting superintendent.

In 1977, there was a dispute between the board and the Mountain Home Education Association over teacher pay.

== Schools ==
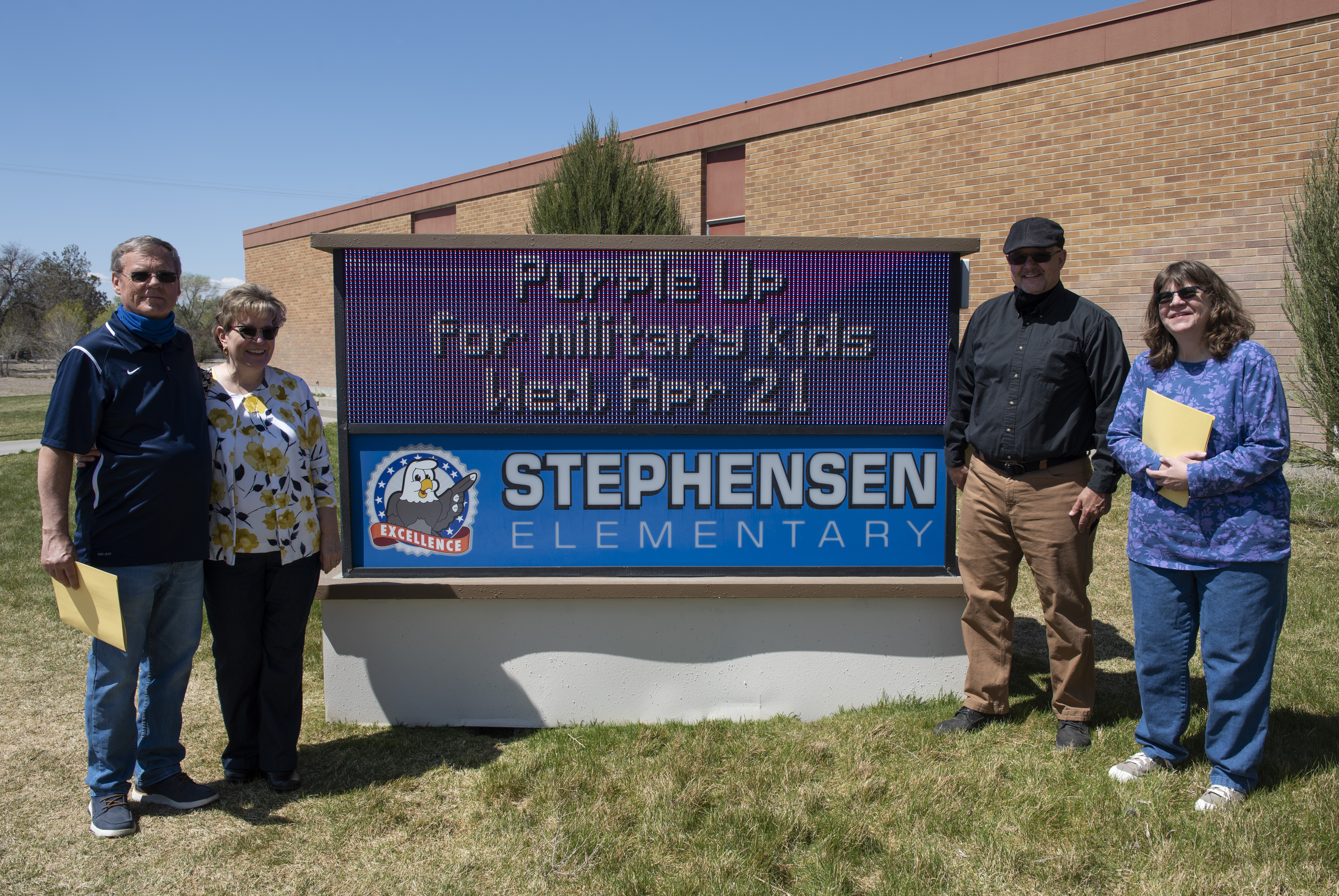
Stephenson Elementary School

=== Secondary ===
- Mountain Home Senior High School (grades 9-12)
- Mountain Home Junior High School (grades 7-8)
- Hacker Middle School (grades 5-6)

=== Elementary (PK-4) ===
- East Elementary School
- North Elementary School
- Stephenson Elementary School (on-post at Mountain Home Air Force Base)
  - The elementary school, in 2014, was renamed after Mark L. Stephensen, a USAF colonel based at MHAFB who, in April 1967, went missing while on his military duties. The school's previous name was Mountain Home Air Force Base Primary School. In 2026 Mike Simpson, a member of Congress, lobbied to have $6,409,000 in federal funding for a new building.
- West Elementary School

=== Alternative ===
- Bennett Mountain High School (6-12)
