= Bruneau, Idaho =

Unincorporated community in the state of Idaho, United States

- Census-designated place
- Location within the state of Idaho Bruneau, Idaho (the United States)
- Coordinates: 42°52′25″N 115°47′50″W
- Country: United States
- State: Idaho
- County: Owyhee
- Elevation: 2,510 ft (770 m)
- Time zone: UTC-7 (Mountain (MST))
  - Summer (DST): UTC-6 (MDT)
- ZIP codes: 83604
- Area codes: 208, 986
- GNIS feature ID: 2806611

Bruneau is a Census-designated place in Owyhee County in the southwestern part of the U.S. state of Idaho. The mouth of the Bruneau River is to the northwest and Bruneau Sand Dunes State Park is to the east. As of the 2020 census, Bruneau had a population of 121.

== History ==
Bruneau's population was 105 in 1909, and was estimated at 200 in 1960.

== Geography ==
=== Climate ===
According to the Köppen Climate Classification system, Bruneau has a semi-arid climate, abbreviated "BSk" on climate maps. Bruneau is the hottest city in the entire state of Idaho, with a yearly average high temperature of 69 °F (21 °C). Its winters are short and mild, and summers are hot and dry.

== Highways ==
State Highway 51 northbound crosses the Snake River and continues to Mountain Home in Elmore County; southbound it becomes Nevada Route 225 at the border and continues to Elko. State Highway 78 heads northwest within Owyhee County to Grand View, Murphy, and Marsing. Eastbound SH-78 crosses the Snake River and links through Hammett to Interstate 84.

Historical population
Census	Pop.	Note	%±
1880	75		—
1890	63		−16.0%
1900	105		66.7%
1910	150		42.9%
1920	490		226.7%
1930	300		−38.8%
1940	300		0.0%
1950	300		0.0%
1960	200		−33.3%
1970	100		−50.0%
1980	190		90.0%
1990	190		0.0%

== Education ==
The school district is Bruneau-Grand View Joint School District 365.
