= Rodney A. Hawes Jr. =

- Born: 1938 (age 87–88); Marsing, Idaho, U.S.
- Occupations: Business executive; investor; philanthropist
- Spouse: Beverly Hawes
- Children: 6

Rodney A. Hawes Jr. (born 1938) is an American business executive, investor, and philanthropist. He served as the chairman and chief executive officer of Life Re Corporation, a reinsurance corporation traded on the New York Stock Exchange, from 1992 until its 1998 merger with Swiss Re. He has made large charitable contributions to the Harvard Business School, where Hawes Hall was named in his honor.

== Early life ==
Rodney A. Hawes Jr. was born in 1938 and grew up in Marsing, Idaho, near Boise. His father was a newspaper editor. His mother was a schoolteacher.

Hawes graduated from Stanford University. He received a master in business administration from the Harvard Business School in 1969, where he was a Baker Scholar.

== Career ==
Prior to his MBA, Hawes worked for the Mutual Life Insurance Company of New York (now AXA) for five years.

Hawes founded Insurance Investment Associates, a mergers and acquisitions advisory firm for the insurance industry, in 1972.

With coworkers, Hawes acquired the Life Re Corporation, a reinsurance corporation headquartered in Connecticut, in 1988. Hawes served as its chairman and chief executive officer. The corporation was listed on the New York Stock Exchange in 1992. It merged with Swiss Re in 1998.

Hawes served on the board of directors of W. R. Berkley Corporation.

== Philanthropy ==
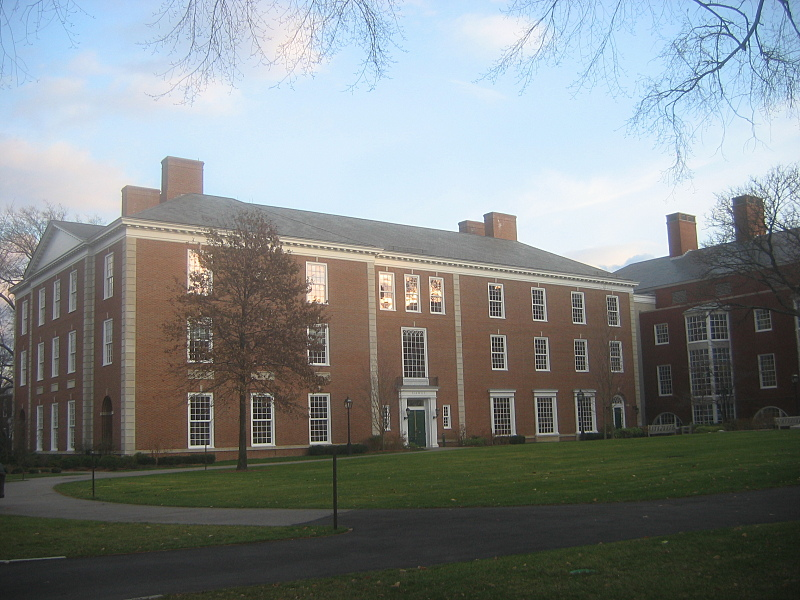
Hawes Hall on the campus of the Harvard Business School.

Hawes made a large donation to the Harvard Business School for the construction of Hawes Hall, named in his honor and completed in 2002. He also endowed the Beverly & Rodney Hawes Jr. Endowed Scholarship at Charter Oak State College.

Hawes has served on the National Advisory Council of the Marriott School of Management at Brigham Young University since 1997.

== Personal life ==
Hawes is married to Beverly. They have six children. Hawes was raised as a Presbyterian. He converted to the Church of Jesus Christ of Latter-day Saints (LDS Church) in 1966.
