= Hansen Bridge =

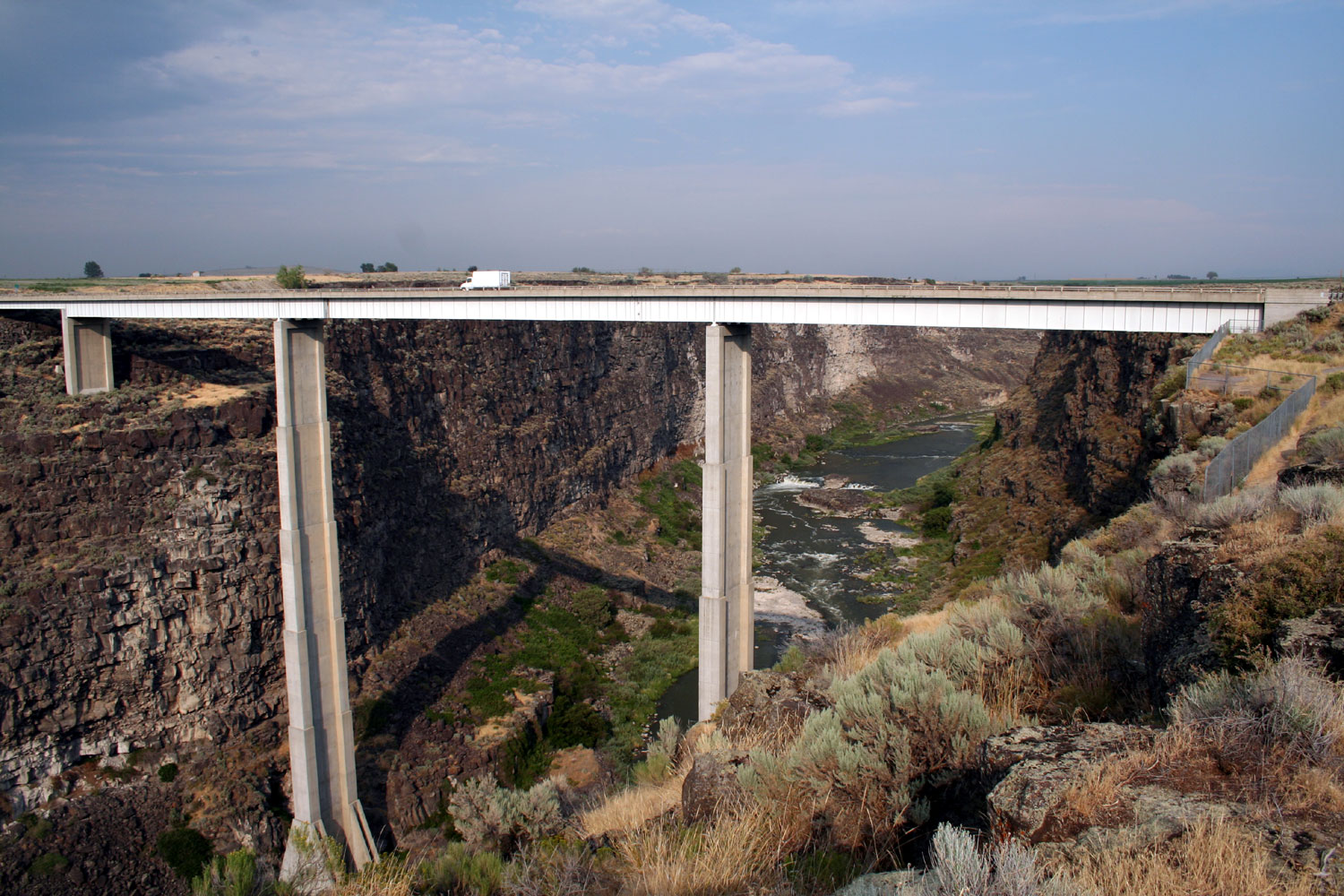
- Coordinates: 42.5664°N 114.2998°W
- Carries: Idaho State Highway 50
- Crosses: Snake River
- Locale: Near Twin Falls, Idaho

Characteristics
- Material: Concrete and steel
- Total length: 762 ft (232 m)
- Width: 27.9 ft (8.5 m)
- Height: 350 ft (110 m)
- Longest span: 258 ft (79 m)
- No. of spans: 3

History
- Construction end: 1966

Statistics
- Daily traffic: 9,000

Location
- Interactive map of Hansen Bridge

The Hansen Bridge is a 350-foot (110 m) high concrete deck girder bridge that carries Idaho State Highway 50 over the Snake River Canyon near Twin Falls, Idaho. The bridge spans the border of Jerome and Twin Falls Counties.

The original bridge constructed at this location was a steel suspension bridge 325 feet (99 m) high, with a wooden deck just 14 feet (4.3 m) wide. It was constructed by Midland Bridge Co. of Kansas City and the chief engineer was R.M. Murray. Completed in 1919 at a cost of $100,000, it was the first bridge to span the Snake River Canyon in southern Idaho, and provided a needed connection between the two halves of the Magic Valley region once split by the canyon. Because the 1919 Hansen bridge was capable only of supporting light wagon traffic, the Perrine Bridge was opened in 1927 at a location several miles farther west. The Hansen Bridge is located just north of, and is named after, the town of Hansen in Twin Falls County.

The current bridge was constructed in 1966 to replace the aging original structure, which was subsequently demolished. The new bridge is also known as the Veterans Memorial Bridge.

== See also ==
- List of crossings of the Snake River
- List of bridges in the United States by height
