= Bruneau Dunes State Park =

State park in Idaho, United States

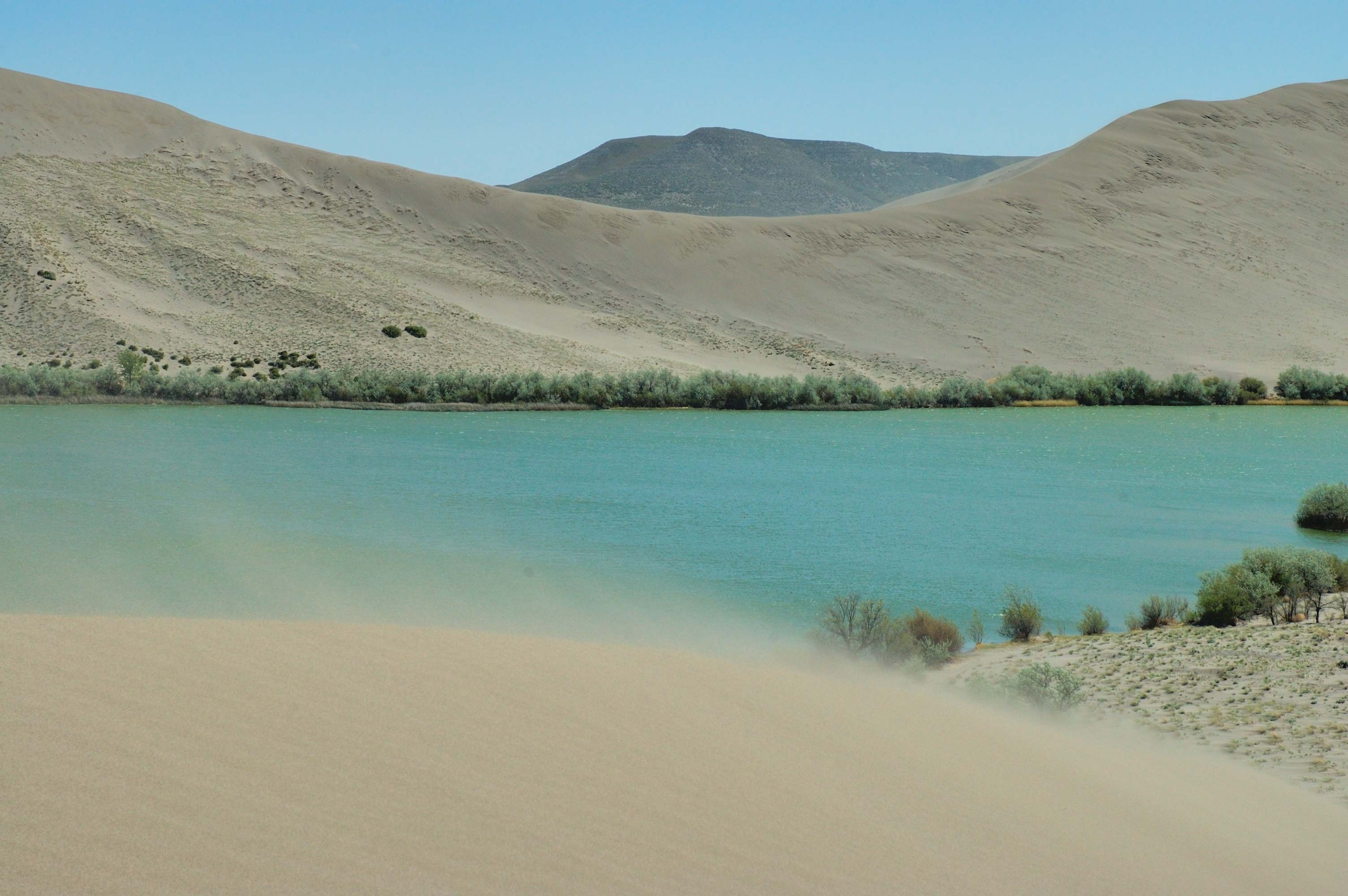

- Location within Idaho Location within the United States
- Location: Owyhee County, Idaho, United States
- Nearest city: Mountain Home, Idaho
- Coordinates: 42°54′36″N 115°42′35″W
- Area: 4,800 acres (1,900 ha)
- Elevation: 2,470 ft (750 m)
- Established: 1967
- Administrator: Idaho Department of Parks and Recreation
- Website: Official website

Bruneau Dunes State Park is a public recreation and geologic preservation area in the western United States, located in Owyhee County in southwestern Idaho. It is northeast of Bruneau and fifteen miles (25 km) south of Mountain Home.

Featuring large sand dunes and small lakes, the state park is the site of North America's tallest single-structured sand dune, which is approximately 470 feet (140 m) in height. (Note: The highest multistructured dune in North America is at Great Sand Dunes National Park and Preserve in Colorado and is approximately 750 feet (230 m) high.) The park encompasses 4,800 acres (7.5 mi^{2}; 19 km^{2}) and features the Bruneau Dunes Observatory, where visitors can use a telescope for stargazing. The Sand Dunes, the visible dunes within the dune field itself, encompass appx 576 acres (0.900 mi^{2}; 2.33 km^{2}).

== Natural history ==
View of the main dune

Geology

The park's dunes are unique in the Western Hemisphere: where others in the Americas form at the edge of a natural basin, the Bruneau dunes form near the center. The basin has acted as a natural trap for over 12,000 years. The dunes may have started with sands from the Bonneville Flood about 15,000 years ago. With prevailing winds blowing from the southeast 28 percent of the time and from the northwest 32 percent of the time, the dunes stay fairly stable, and unlike most dunes, do not drift far.

Flora and fauna

The state park includes desert, dune, prairie, lake and marsh habitat. Desert wildlife, including coyotes, is prominent along with birds of prey and waterfowl.

== Park history ==
Land for the park was purchased under the Recreation and Public Purposes Act in May 1967. Additional acreage was acquired in 1980 and in 1984, bringing the park's total area to 4,800 acres (19 km^{2}).

== Recreation ==
Activities include sandboarding, fishing, birdwatching, camping, hiking, swimming, and viewing the stars at the public observatory. No motorized vehicles are allowed on the dunes; climbing and sledding are permitted. There are seven-mile (11 km) and nine-mile (14 km) horseback riding trails around the dunes. An educational center offers natural history displays. The astronomical observatory is open Friday and Saturday evenings mid-March through mid-October.

== See also ==
- List of Idaho state parks
- National Parks in Idaho
