= Grasmere, Idaho =

- Ghost town
- Location within the state of Idaho
- Coordinates: 42°22′36″N 115°52′57″W
- Country: United States
- State: Idaho
- County: Owyhee
- Elevation: 5,089 ft (1,551 m)
- Time zone: UTC-7 (Mountain (MST))
  - Summer (DST): UTC-6 (MDT)
- ZIP codes: 83604
- Area code: 208
- GNIS feature ID: 376052

Airfield information
- IATA: none; ICAO: none; FAA LID: U91

Summary
- Elevation AMSL: 5,134 ft (1,565 m)
- Coordinates: 42°22′23.9″N 115°52′46″W
- Interactive map of Airfield information

Runways
Direction	Length		Surface
Direction	ft	m	Surface
05/23	2,750	838	Turf/dirt (150 ft or 46 m wide)
- Sources: Federal Aviation Administration

Grasmere is an abandoned service stop in the southwestern part of the U.S. state of Idaho, in Owyhee County. Located on State Highway 51, it is 32.5 miles (52.3 km) north of the border with Nevada and 58.5 miles (94.1 km) south of Mountain Home. Grasmere was the former site of a small gas station/bar&grill/post office.

The site is now occupied by a remote United States Air Force station staffed by active duty aviators from the nearby Mountain Home Air Force Base and Idaho Air National Guard aviators from Gowen Field in Boise. The station operates the flight training range over Bruneau Canyon of the Bruneau River just east of here for aircraft from their bases and other nearby bases in the region (such as Hill Air Force Base and Fairchild Air Force Base). There is also an unattended general aviation airport in service since April 1956, owned by the Idaho Transportation Department.

In 2000, the average median household income for the ZIP Code Tabulation Area that includes Grasmere and Riddle was $30,921. Grasmere's elevation is 5,089 feet (1,551 m) above sea level.
