= Walters Ferry, Idaho =

Unincorporated community in Canyon County, Idaho, United States

- Unincorporated community
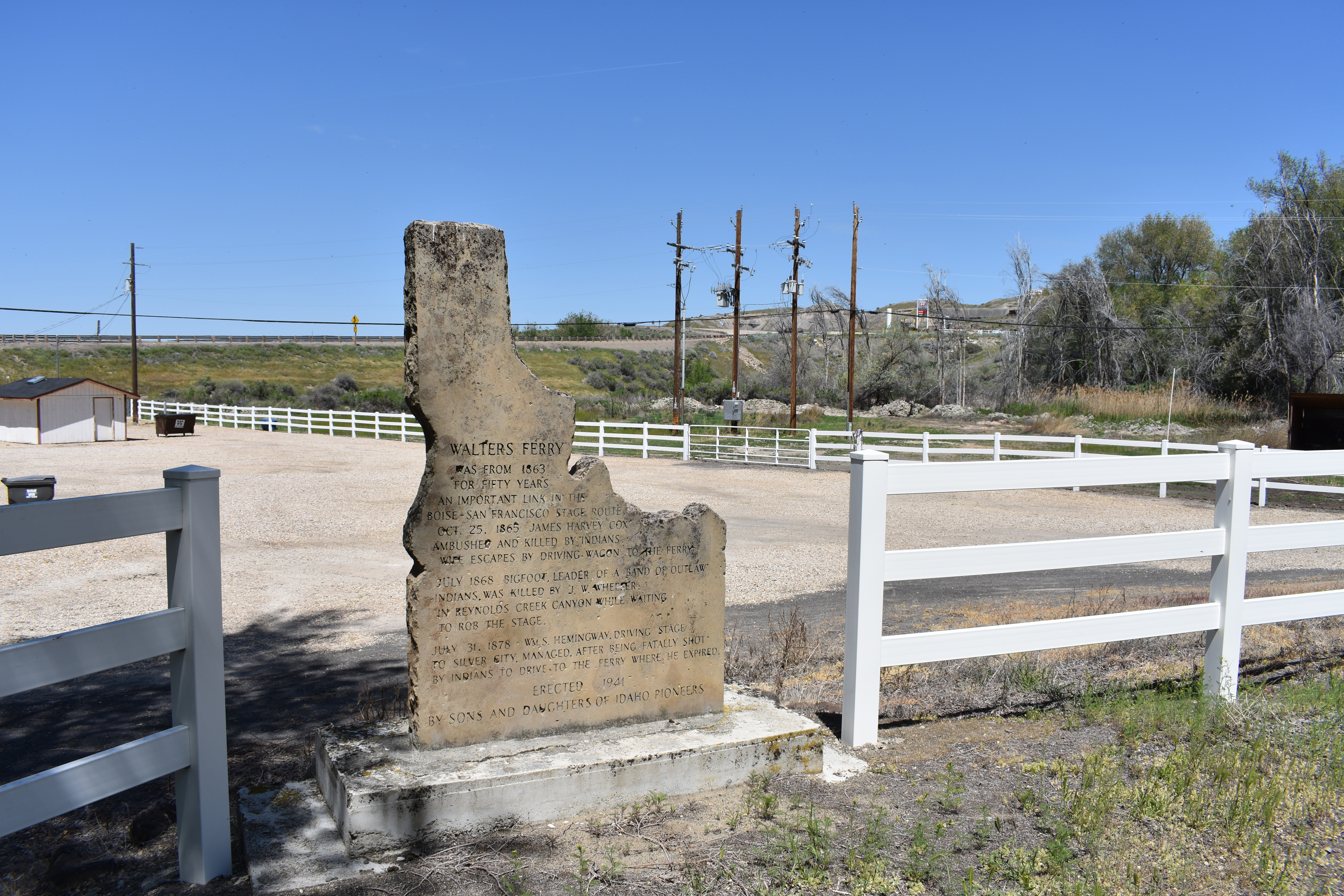

- Location within Idaho Location within the United States
- Coordinates: 43°20′26″N 116°35′58″W
- Country: United States
- State: Idaho
- County: Canyon
- Elevation: 2,264 ft (690 m)
- Time zone: UTC-7 (Mountain (MST))
  - Summer (DST): UTC-6 (MDT)
- ZIP Code: 83641
- GNIS feature ID: 400160

Walters Ferry is an unincorporated community along the Snake River in Canyon County, Idaho, United States, roughly 16.5 miles (26.6 km) south of Nampa. Walters Ferry had a post office ("Walters") 1888–1898. The community is located along State Highway 45, near its southern terminus.
