= Grand View, Idaho =

City in Owyhee County, Idaho, United States

- City
- Location of Grand View in Owyhee County, Idaho.
- Coordinates: 42°59′02″N 116°05′30″W
- Country: United States
- State: Idaho
- County: Owyhee

Area
  - Total: 0.60 sq mi (1.56 km^{2})
  - Land: 0.58 sq mi (1.49 km^{2})
  - Water: 0.027 sq mi (0.07 km^{2})
- Elevation: 2,385 ft (727 m)

Population (2020)
  - Total: 440
  - Density: 765/sq mi (295/km^{2})
- Time zone: UTC-7 (Mountain (MST))
  - Summer (DST): UTC-6 (MDT)
- ZIP code: 83624
- Area codes: 208, 986
- FIPS code: 16-32770
- GNIS feature ID: 2410635
- Website: www.grandview.id

Grand View is a city along the Snake River in Owyhee County, Idaho, United States. The population was 440 at the 2020 census. It is part of the Boise City–Nampa, Idaho Metropolitan Statistical Area.

== Geography ==
Grand View is on the Snake River, which is the border with Elmore County.

According to the United States Census Bureau, the city has a total area of 0.60 square miles (1.55 km^{2}), of which, 0.57 square miles (1.48 km^{2}) is land and 0.03 square miles (0.08 km^{2}) is water.

== Demographics ==
Historical population
Census	Pop.	Note	%±
1980	366		—
1990	330		−9.8%
2000	470		42.4%
2010	452		−3.8%
2020	440		−2.7%
U.S. Decennial Census

=== 2010 census ===
As of the census of 2010, there were 452 people, 172 households, and 110 families living in the city. The population density was 793.0 inhabitants per square mile (306.2/km^{2}). There were 198 housing units at an average density of 347.4 per square mile (134.1/km^{2}). The racial makeup of the city was 84.7% White, 0.7% African American, 2.4% Native American, 0.2% Asian, 8.8% from other races, and 3.1% from two or more races. Hispanic or Latino of any race were 16.8% of the population.

There were 172 households, of which 35.5% had children under the age of 18 living with them, 48.3% were married couples living together, 9.3% had a female householder with no husband present, 6.4% had a male householder with no wife present, and 36.0% were non-families. 30.8% of all households were made up of individuals, and 13.3% had someone living alone who was 65 years of age or older. The average household size was 2.5,8 and the average family size was 3.26.

The median age in the city was 33.8 years. 31% of residents were under the age of 18; 7.5% were between the ages of 18 and 24; 21.1% were from 25 to 44; 24.1% were from 45 to 64; and 16.4% were 65 years of age or older. The gender makeup of the city was 52.7% male and 47.3% female. The City of Grand View website is at http://www.grandview.id.gov/

=== 2000 census ===
As of the census of 2000, there were 470 people, 187 households, and 126 families living in the city. The population density was 856.7 inhabitants per square mile (330.8/km^{2}). There were 228 housing units at an average density of 415.6 per square mile (160.5/km^{2}). The racial makeup of the city was 92.77% White, 1.91% Native American, 4.04% from other races, and 1.28% from two or more races. Hispanic or Latino of any race were 16.60% of the population.

There were 187 households, out of which 34.8% had children under the age of 18 living with them, 49.7% were married couples living together, 12.8% had a female householder with no husband present, and 32.6% were non-families. 28.3% of all households were made up of individuals, and 13.4% had someone living alone who was 65 years of age or older. The average household size was 2.5,1 and the average family size was 3.08.

In the city, the population was spread out, with 30.9% under the age of 18, 11.5% from 18 to 24, 24.5% from 25 to 44, 17.9% from 45 to 64, and 15.3% who were 65 years of age or older. The median age was 34 years. For every 100 females, there were 95.8 males. For every 100 females age 18 and over, there were 91.2 males.

The median income for a household in the city was $21,417, and the median income for a family was $26,000. Males had a median income of $25,417 versus $27,917 for females. The per capita income for the city was $11,402. About 25.0% of families and 28.6% of the population were below the poverty line, including 34.9% of those under age 18 and 28.9% of those age 65 or over.

== Highways ==
The city is served by State Highway 167, which connects eastward to Mountain Home in Elmore County. Within Owyhee County, State Highway 78 heads northwest to Murphy and Marsing, and southeast to Bruneau.

== Education ==
The school district is Bruneau-Grand View Joint School District 365.

== See also ==
- List of cities in Idaho
