= Hammett, Idaho =

Unincorporated community in the Elmore County, Idaho, United States

- Unincorporated community
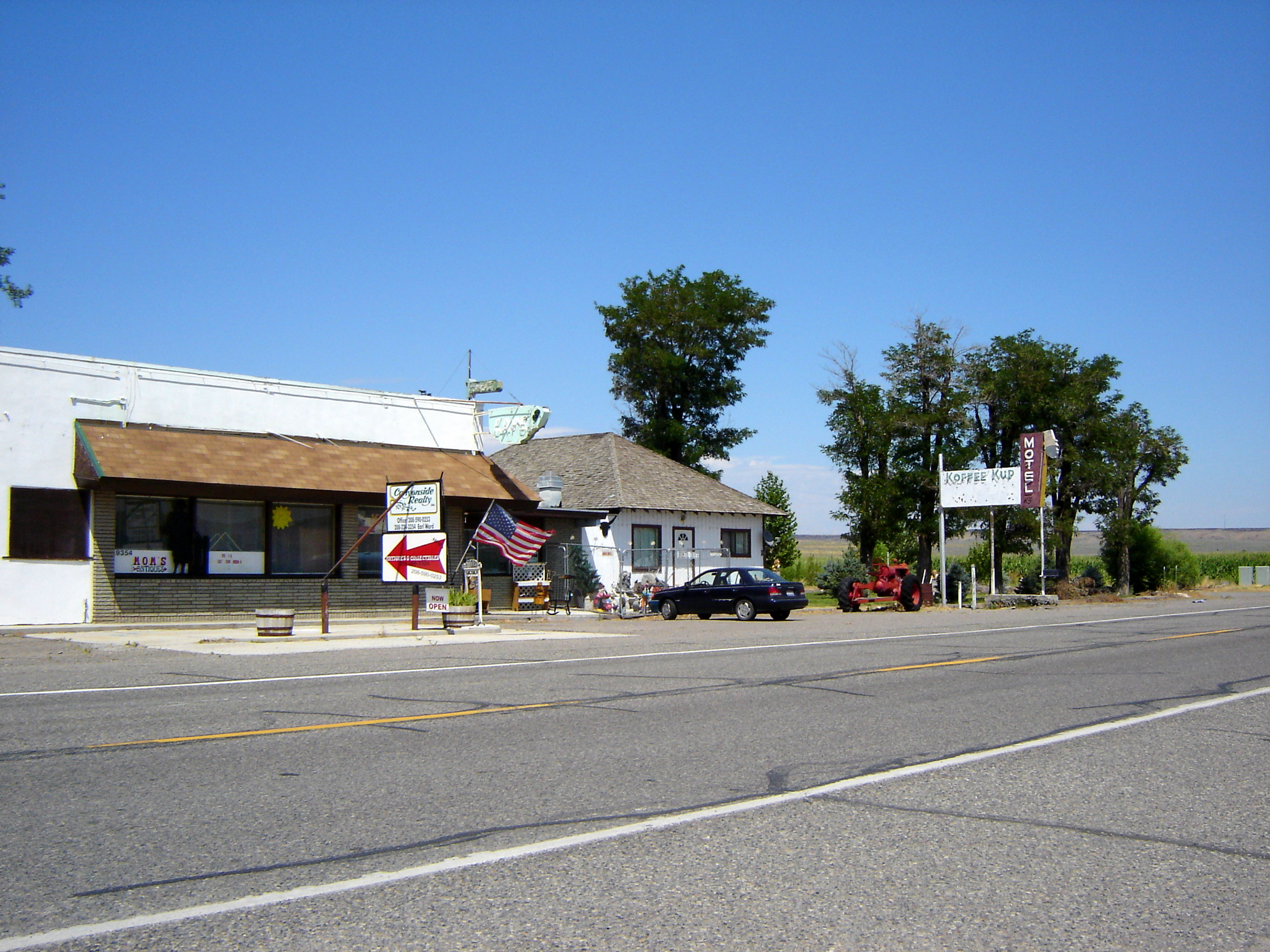
- Shop in Hammett, July 2009

- Location within Idaho Location within the United States
- Coordinates: 42°56′39″N 115°27′56″W
- Country: United States
- State: Idaho
- County: Elmore
- Elevation: 2,533 ft (772 m)
- Time zone: UTC-7 (Mountain (MST))
  - Summer (DST): UTC-6 (MDT)
- ZIP Code: 83627
- Area codes: 208, 986
- GNIS feature ID: 2804063

Hammett is an unincorporated community in Elmore County, Idaho, United States. As of the 2020 census, Hammett had a population of 332. Hammett is located along Interstate 84 Business and Idaho State Highway 78, about 8.5 miles (13.7 km) west of Glenns Ferry. Hammett has a post office with ZIP Code 83627.

== History ==
Hammett's population was 75 in 1960.

== Education ==
It is in the Glenns Ferry Joint School District 192.
