= C. J. Strike Dam =

C.J. Strike Dam
- Location in the United States Location in Idaho
- Country: United States
- Location: Elmore / Owyhee counties, Idaho
- Coordinates: 42°56′54″N 115°58′30″W
- Construction began: 1950
- Opening date: 1952; 74 years ago
- Operator: Idaho Power Company

Dam and spillways
- Impounds: Snake River
- Height: 115 feet (35 m)
- Length: 3,220 feet (981 m)

Reservoir
- Creates: C. J. Strike Reservoir
- Total capacity: 247,000 acre-feet (305,000,000 m^{3})
- Catchment area: 40,800 square miles (105,700 km^{2})
- Surface area: 7,500 acres (30 km^{2})
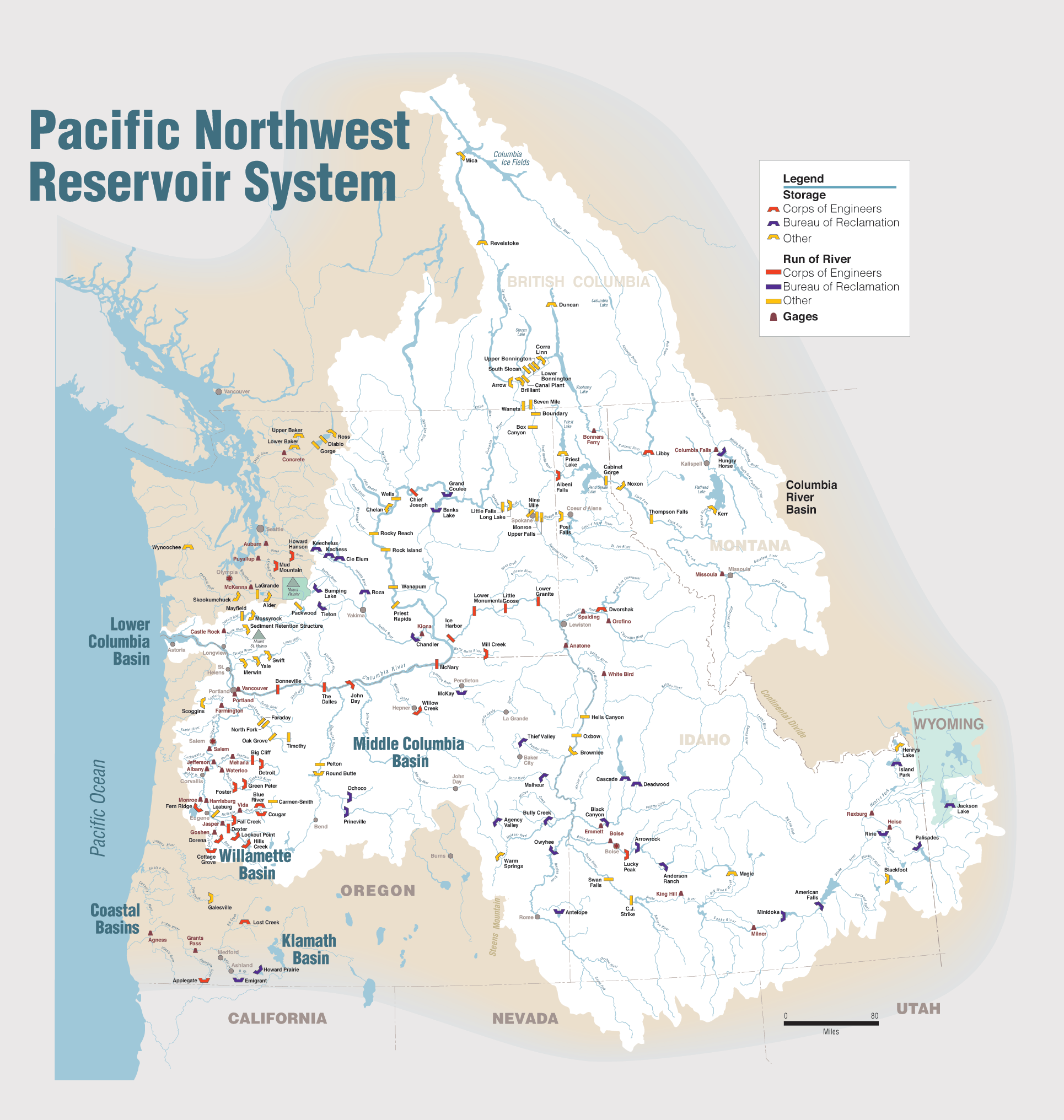
- Columbia River Basin

C. J. Strike Dam is an earth-fill type hydroelectric dam in the western United States, on the Snake River in southwestern Idaho. Located just below the Bruneau River confluence near Grand View, its impoundment extends 36 miles (58 km) up the Snake River and twelve miles (19 km) up the Bruneau River.

Named after Clifford J. Strike, the general manager of Idaho Power Company from 1938 to 1948, the dam's powerplant has a nameplate capacity of 82.8 MW.

Due to the poor fish passage performance of Swan Falls Dam, the C.J. Strike Dam, upriver from Swan Falls, was built without fish passage facilities. Thus the two dams combined became the first artificial barrier to anadromous fish migration up the Snake River. Today, Hells Canyon Dam (1967) is the first total barrier to fish migration on the Snake.

Surrounding the dam and its reservoir are a number of campgrounds, boat launches, docks, and hiking trails. It is a popular destination for fishermen. Trout, Small and Large Mouth Bass, Crappie, Perch, Bluegill, Sturgeon and many other kinds of fish can be caught in the waters around the dam. Fishing tournaments are held there during the season.

As of 2009, many of the campgrounds surrounding the dam have been improved, adding designated RV camp sites, docks, improving accessibility, parking, and the restrooms in the many campgrounds.

== See also ==
- List of dams in the Columbia River watershed
