= Elmore County, Idaho =

County in Idaho, United States

- County
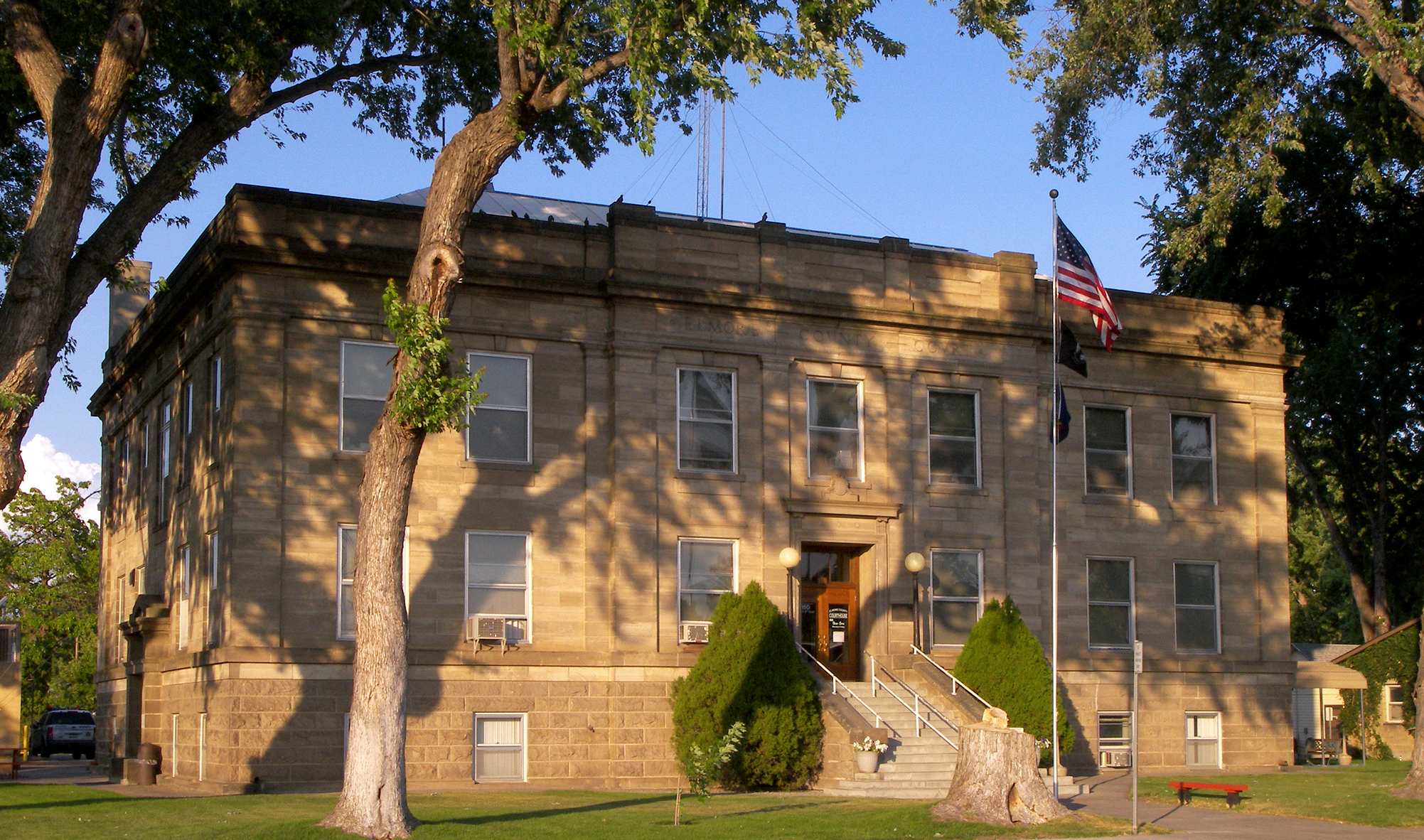
- Elmore County Courthouse

- Seal

- Location within the U.S. state of Idaho
- Coordinates: 43°20′N 115°28′W
- Country: United States
- State: Idaho
- Founded: February 7, 1889
- Named for: The Ida Elmore mines, producer of silver and gold in the 1860s
- Seat: Mountain Home
- Largest city: Mountain Home

Area
  - Total: 3,101 sq mi (8,030 km^{2})
  - Land: 3,075 sq mi (7,960 km^{2})
  - Water: 26 sq mi (67 km^{2}) 0.8%

Population (2020)
  - Total: 28,666
  - Estimate (2025): 29,465 ▲
  - Density: 9.322/sq mi (3.599/km^{2})
- Time zone: UTC−7 (Mountain)
  - Summer (DST): UTC−6 (MDT)
- Congressional district: 2nd
- Website: elmorecounty.org

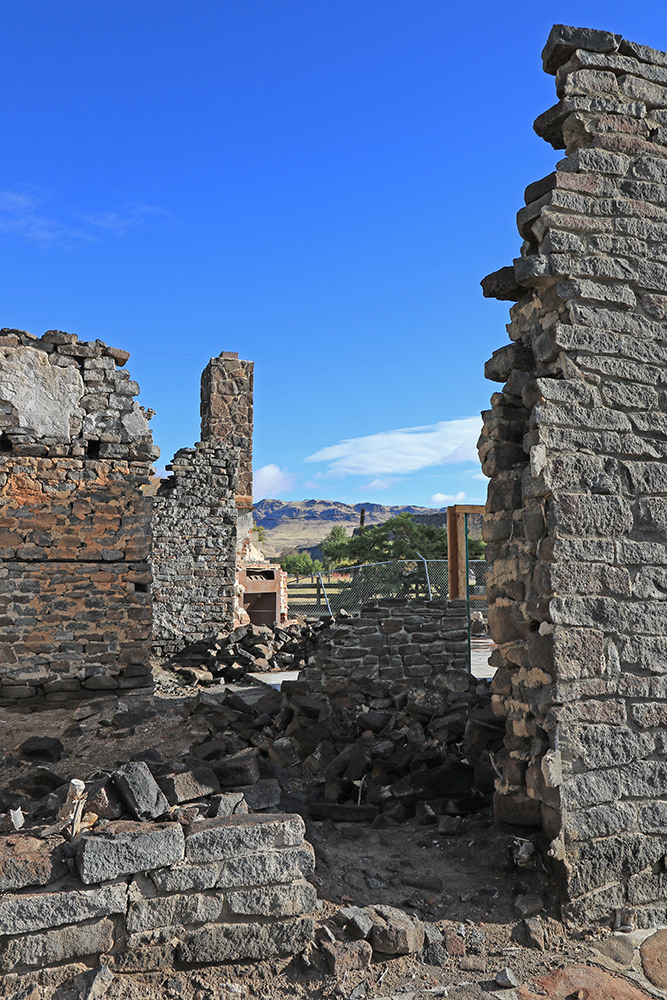
Canyon Creek Station on the Oregon Trail, Elmore County

Elmore County is a county in the U.S. state of Idaho. As of the 2020 census, the population was 28,666. The largest city and county seat is Mountain Home.

Elmore County comprises the Mountain Home, ID Micropolitan Statistical Area, which is also included in the Boise-Mountain Home-Ontario, ID-OR Combined Statistical Area.

== History ==
Elmore County was established February 7, 1889, with its county seat at Rocky Bar. It is named after the Ida Elmore mines, the area's greatest silver and gold producer of the 1860s, located near Silver City in Owyhee County.

While the Oregon Trail crossed the Snake River in Elmore County, at Three Island Crossing near Glenns Ferry, the significant early settlements of Elmore County were mining settlements located primarily in northern Elmore County surrounding the ghost town of Rocky Bar. Settlement at Rocky Bar commenced in 1863 with the settlement having 560 residents at the Territorial Census of that year. Nearby, Atlanta was settled in 1864. Elmore County north of the Snake River was originally part of Alturas County when it was created in 1864 and Rocky Bar became its county seat. The portion of Elmore County south of the Snake River was within Owyhee County until 1930. A small portion of Ada County was also annexed in 1948, bringing Elmore to its present boundary. The settlement at Rocky Bar was impacted by poor management by mining companies, mining lawsuits, and its geographic remoteness between 1869 and 1880. The Wood River experienced a surge in settlement at Hailey starting in 1880 that led to Rocky Bar's loss of the county seat to Hailey in 1882. Rocky Bar would briefly become a county seat upon the creation of Elmore County in 1889.

A station on the overland stage route, originally named Rattlesnake, was moved west to the railroad line and became Mountain Home. On February 4, 1891, the county seat was moved to Mountain Home.

Construction of Mountain Home Air Force Base began in October 1942, twelve miles (19 km) southwest of Mountain Home. The base officially opened in August 1943 as a training base for bombers, and was an operational base under the Strategic Air Command (SAC) through 1965. It became a fighter base in 1966 under Tactical Air Command (TAC), which became Air Combat Command (ACC) in 1992.

Anderson Ranch Dam is east of Mountain Home on the South Fork of the Boise River. At the time of its completion in 1950, it was the world's highest earthfill dam.

== Geography ==
According to the U.S. Census Bureau, the county has a total area of 3,101 square miles (8,030 km^{2}), of which 3,075 square miles (7,960 km^{2}) is land and 26 square miles (67 km^{2}) (0.8%) is water. Elmore County's highest point is Snowyside Peak at 10,651 feet (3,246 m) above sea level, located in the northeast corner of the county in the Sawtooth Wilderness. The lowest elevation in the county is the Snake River in the southwest corner, at less than 2,500 feet (760 m).

=== Adjacent counties ===
- Boise County - north
- Ada County - west
- Owyhee County - south
- Twin Falls County - southeast
- Gooding County - east
- Camas County - east
- Blaine County - northeast
- Custer County - northeast

=== Major highways ===
- I-84
- I-84 BL
- US 20
- US 26
- US 30
- SH-51
- SH-67
- SH-78
- SH-167

=== National protected areas ===
- Boise National Forest (part)
- Sawtooth National Forest (part)
- Sawtooth National Recreation Area (part)
  - Sawtooth Wilderness (part)
- Snake River Birds of Prey National Conservation Area (part)

== Demographics ==
Historical population
Census	Pop.	Note	%±
1890	1,870		—
1900	2,286		22.2%
1910	4,785		109.3%
1920	5,087		6.3%
1930	4,491		−11.7%
1940	5,518		22.9%
1950	6,687		21.2%
1960	16,719		150.0%
1970	17,479		4.5%
1980	21,565		23.4%
1990	21,205		−1.7%
2000	29,130		37.4%
2010	27,038		−7.2%
2020	28,666		6.0%
2025 (est.)	29,465	▲	2.8%
U.S. Decennial Census; 1790–1960, 1900–1990, 1990–2000, 2010–2020

=== Racial and ethnic composition ===
Elmore County, Idaho – Racial and ethnic composition Note: the US Census treats Hispanic/Latino as an ethnic category. This table excludes Latinos from the racial categories and assigns them to a separate category. Hispanics/Latinos may be of any race.
Race / Ethnicity (NH = Non-Hispanic)	Pop 1980	Pop 1990	Pop 2000	Pop 2010	Pop 2020	% 1980	% 1990	% 2000	% 2010	% 2020
White alone (NH)	18,383	18,250	23,218	20,305	19,996	85.24%	86.06%	79.70%	75.10%	69.76%
Black or African American alone (NH)	795	763	914	696	688	3.69%	3.60%	3.14%	2.57%	2.40%
Native American or Alaska Native alone (NH)	115	144	231	224	234	0.53%	0.68%	0.79%	0.83%	0.82%
Asian alone (NH)	328	425	479	748	766	1.52%	2.00%	1.64%	2.77%	2.67%
Native Hawaiian or Pacific Islander alone (NH)	x	x	51	101	101	x	x	0.18%	0.37%	0.35%
Other race alone (NH)	168	26	69	52	145	0.78%	0.12%	0.24%	0.19%	0.51%
Mixed race or Multiracial (NH)	x	x	676	794	1,639	x	x	2.32%	2.94%	5.72%
Hispanic or Latino (any race)	1,776	1,597	3,492	4,118	5,097	8.24%	7.53%	11.99%	15.23%	17.78%
Total	21,565	21,205	29,130	27,038	28,666	100.00%	100.00%	100.00%	100.00%	100.00%

=== 2020 census ===
As of the 2020 census, the county had a population of 28,666. The median age was 32.7 years. 25.2% of residents were under the age of 18 and 13.9% of residents were 65 years of age or older. For every 100 females there were 107.7 males, and for every 100 females age 18 and over there were 108.5 males age 18 and over.

The racial makeup of the county was 75.0% White, 2.6% Black or African American, 1.2% American Indian and Alaska Native, 2.8% Asian, 0.4% Native Hawaiian and Pacific Islander, 7.5% from some other race, and 10.5% from two or more races. Hispanic or Latino residents of any race comprised 17.8% of the population.

62.1% of residents lived in urban areas, while 37.9% lived in rural areas.

There were 10,663 households in the county, of which 33.3% had children under the age of 18 living with them and 20.1% had a female householder with no spouse or partner present. About 24.7% of all households were made up of individuals and 9.4% had someone living alone who was 65 years of age or older.

There were 12,049 housing units, of which 11.5% were vacant. Among occupied housing units, 63.3% were owner-occupied and 36.7% were renter-occupied. The homeowner vacancy rate was 1.8% and the rental vacancy rate was 4.2%.

=== 2010 census ===
As of the 2010 United States census, there were 27,038 people, 10,140 households, and 7,135 families living in the county. The population density was 8.8 inhabitants per square mile (3.4/km^{2}). There were 12,162 housing units at an average density of 4.0 units per square mile (1.5 units/km^{2}). The racial makeup of the county was 82.2% white, 2.8% Asian, 2.7% black or African American, 1.0% American Indian, 0.4% Pacific islander, 6.8% from other races, and 4.1% from two or more races. Those of Hispanic or Latino origin made up 15.2% of the population. In terms of ancestry, 20.4% were German, 13.5% were English, 12.4% were Irish, and 9.0% were American.

Of the 10,140 households, 38.6% had children under the age of 18 living with them, 56.6% were married couples living together, 9.4% had a female householder with no husband present, 29.6% were non-families, and 23.8% of all households were made up of individuals. The average household size was 2.60 and the average family size was 3.11. The median age was 30.0 years.

The median income for a household in the county was $43,089 and the median income for a family was $50,840. Males had a median income of $34,126 versus $25,999 for females. The per capita income for the county was $20,388. About 9.2% of families and 12.0% of the population were below the poverty line, including 19.3% of those under age 18 and 7.8% of those age 65 or over.

=== 2000 census ===
As of the census of 2000, there were 29,130 people, 9,092 households, and 6,846 families living in the county. The population density was 10 people per square mile (3.9 people/km^{2}). There were 10,527 housing units at an average density of 3 units per square mile (1.2 units/km^{2}). The racial makeup of the county was 85.37% White, 3.25% Black or African American, 0.89% Native American, 1.66% Asian, 0.19% Pacific Islander, 5.39% from other races, and 3.25% from two or more races. 11.99% of the population were Hispanic or Latino of any race. 16.8% were of German, 12.0% English, 9.2% American and 8.3% Irish ancestry.

There were 9,092 households, out of which 43.00% had children under the age of 18 living with them, 64.10% were married couples living together, 7.50% had a female householder with no husband present, and 24.70% were non-families. 20.70% of all households were made up of individuals, and 6.40% had someone living alone who was 65 years of age or older. The average household size was 2.76 and the average family size was 3.21.

In the county, the population was spread out, with 28.00% under the age of 18, 13.90% from 18 to 24, 36.00% from 25 to 44, 15.00% from 45 to 64, and 7.10% who were 65 years of age or older. The median age was 29 years. For every 100 females there were 123.20 males. For every 100 females age 18 and over, there were 130.60 males.

The median income for a household in the county was $35,256, and the median income for a family was $37,823. Males had a median income of $26,248 versus $21,309 for females. The per capita income for the county was $16,773. About 8.80% of families and 11.20% of the population were below the poverty line, including 15.00% of those under age 18 and 10.80% of those age 65 or over.

== Communities ==
=== Cities ===
- Glenns Ferry
- Mountain Home

=== Census-designated place ===
- Hammett
- Mountain Home Air Force Base

=== Unincorporated communities ===
- Atlanta
- Dixie
- Featherville
- King Hill
- Pine
- Tipanuk

=== Ghost town ===
- Rocky Bar

== Politics ==
United States presidential election results for Elmore County, Idaho
Year	Republican		Democratic		Third party(ies)	
Year	No.	%	No.	%	No.	%
1892	188	34.81%	0	0.00%	352	65.19%
1896	124	18.79%	535	81.06%	1	0.15%
1900	393	41.02%	565	58.98%	0	0.00%
1904	593	53.14%	433	38.80%	90	8.06%
1908	662	42.54%	660	42.42%	234	15.04%
1912	415	27.09%	536	34.99%	581	37.92%
1916	658	35.53%	1,104	59.61%	90	4.86%
1920	1,065	55.12%	867	44.88%	0	0.00%
1924	789	38.01%	381	18.35%	906	43.64%
1928	1,125	59.94%	739	39.37%	13	0.69%
1932	794	31.94%	1,615	64.96%	77	3.10%
1936	688	28.91%	1,567	65.84%	125	5.25%
1940	1,077	39.70%	1,632	60.15%	4	0.15%
1944	1,030	38.62%	1,627	61.00%	10	0.37%
1948	854	34.12%	1,589	63.48%	60	2.40%
1952	1,653	52.66%	1,484	47.28%	2	0.06%
1956	1,849	51.25%	1,759	48.75%	0	0.00%
1960	2,226	47.71%	2,440	52.29%	0	0.00%
1964	1,857	44.56%	2,310	55.44%	0	0.00%
1968	1,908	50.62%	1,230	32.63%	631	16.74%
1972	3,078	66.55%	1,153	24.93%	394	8.52%
1976	2,808	55.46%	2,164	42.74%	91	1.80%
1980	3,994	64.87%	1,760	28.59%	403	6.55%
1984	4,595	75.27%	1,458	23.88%	52	0.85%
1988	3,756	63.46%	2,078	35.11%	85	1.44%
1992	3,087	44.80%	1,858	26.97%	1,945	28.23%
1996	3,668	53.13%	2,324	33.66%	912	13.21%
2000	4,891	70.21%	1,840	26.41%	235	3.37%
2004	6,011	74.57%	1,959	24.30%	91	1.13%
2008	5,665	66.76%	2,591	30.53%	230	2.71%
2012	5,227	65.31%	2,513	31.40%	263	3.29%
2016	5,816	68.25%	1,814	21.29%	892	10.47%
2020	7,246	70.95%	2,601	25.47%	366	3.58%
2024	7,791	73.00%	2,611	24.47%	270	2.53%

== Education ==
School districts include:

- Bliss Joint School District 234
- Bruneau-Grand View Joint School District 365
- Glenns Ferry Joint School District 192
- Mountain Home School District 193
- Prairie Elementary School District 191

Residents in a portion of the county are in the area (but not the taxation zone) for College of Western Idaho. In the remainder, it is in the area (but not the taxation zone) for College of Southern Idaho.

== See also ==
- National Register of Historic Places listings in Elmore County, Idaho
