= Mountain Home, Idaho =

- City
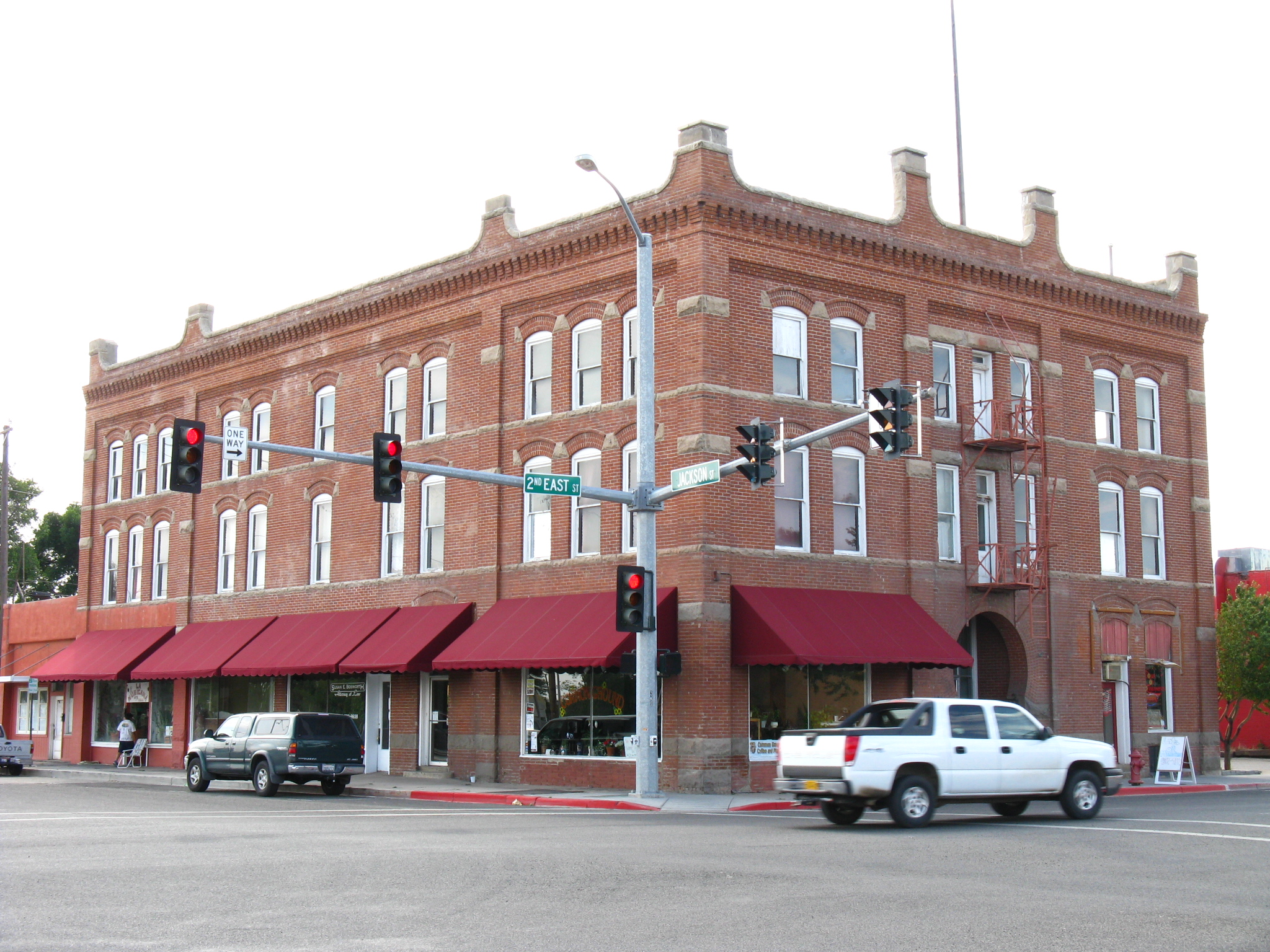
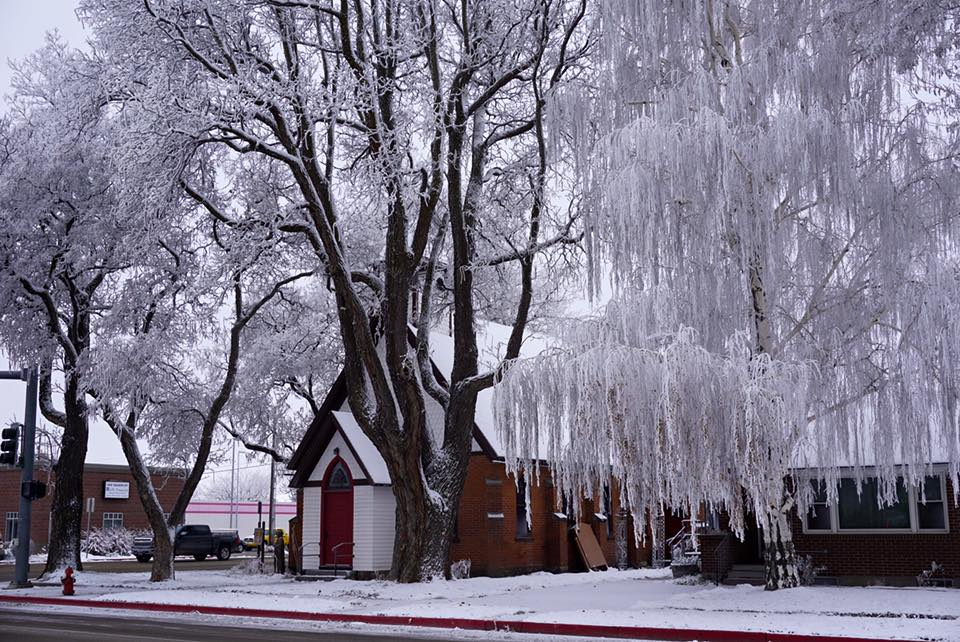
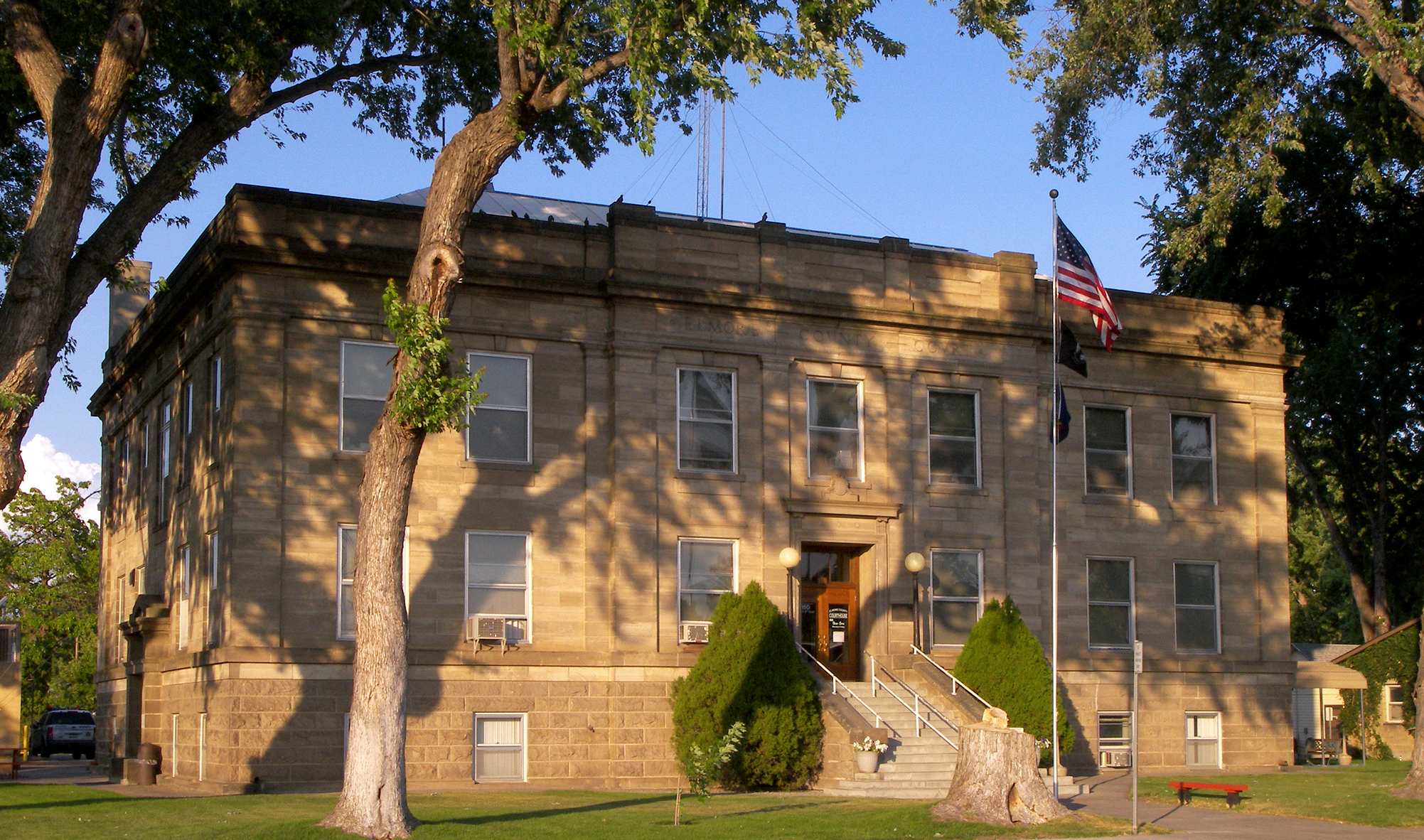
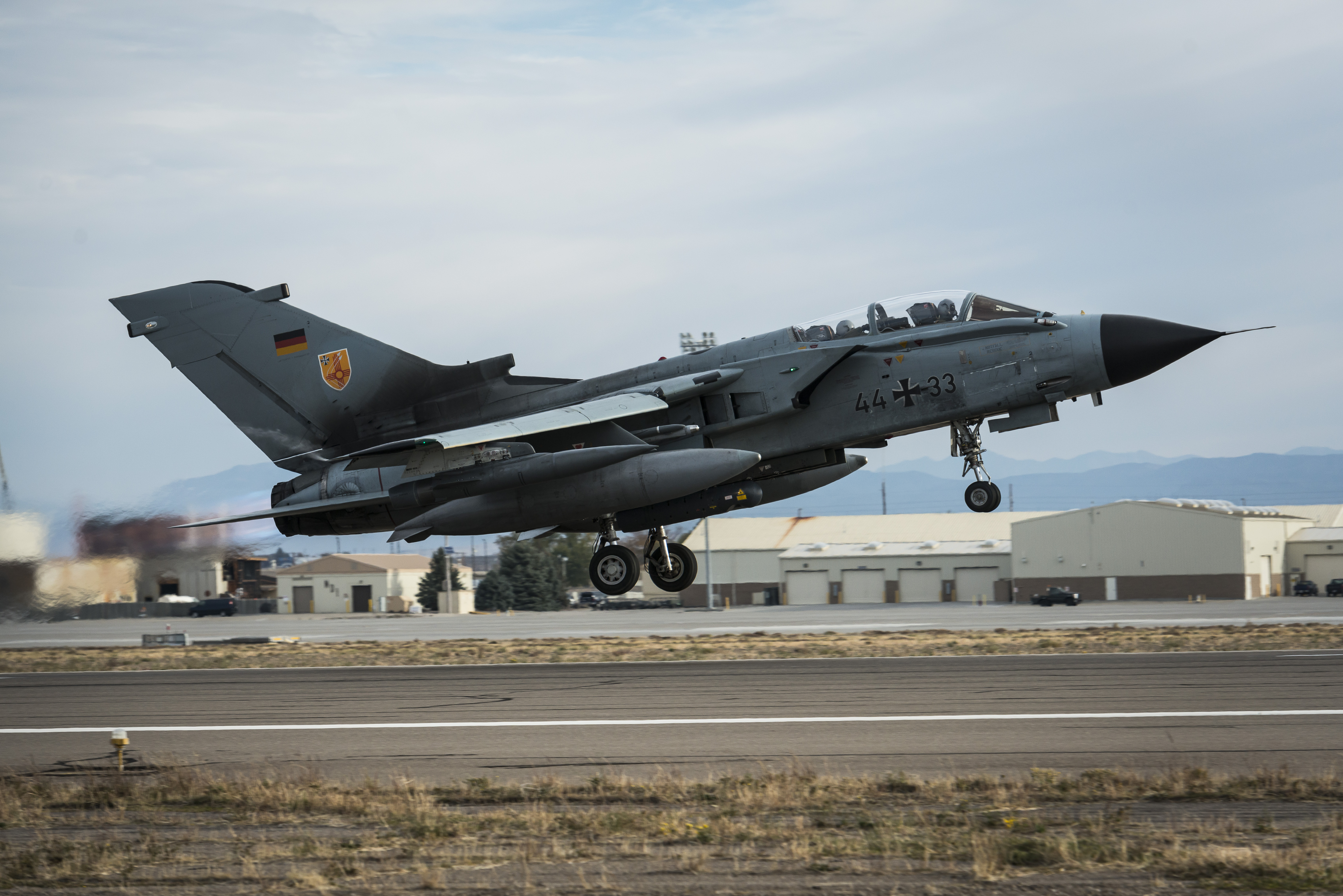
- Clockwise from top: Historic Turner Hotel, Elmore County Courthouse, Mountain Home Air Force Base, St. James Episcopal Church

- Location of Mountain Home in Elmore County, Idaho
- Coordinates: 43°07′30″N 115°41′53″W
- Country: United States
- State: Idaho
- County: Elmore

Area
  - Total: 6.35 sq mi (16.45 km^{2})
  - Land: 6.06 sq mi (15.70 km^{2})
  - Water: 0.29 sq mi (0.75 km^{2})
- Elevation: 3,150 ft (960 m)

Population (2020)
  - Total: 15,979
  - Density: 2,637/sq mi (1,018.1/km^{2})
- Time zone: UTC−7 (Mountain (MST))
  - Summer (DST): UTC−6 (MDT)
- ZIP code: 83647
- Area code: 208
- FIPS code: 16-54730
- GNIS feature ID: 2411185
- Website: mountain-home.us

Mountain Home is the largest city in and the county seat of Elmore County, Idaho, United States. The population was 15,979 in the 2020 census. The population in 2024 is projected to be 16,921. It is the principal city of the Mountain Home Micropolitan Statistical Area, which includes Elmore County.

Mountain Home was originally a post office at Rattlesnake Station, a stagecoach stop on the Overland Stage Line, about seven miles (11 km) east of the city, on present-day US-20 towards Fairfield. With the addition of the Oregon Short Line Railroad in 1883, the post office was moved downhill and west to the city's present site.

Mountain Home Air Force Base, an Air Combat Command installation, is located 12 miles (20 km) southwest of the city. Opened in 1943 during World War II, it was originally a bomber training base and later an operational Strategic Air Command bomber and missile base (1953–65). It switched to Tactical Air Command and fighters in January 1966, which was succeeded by Air Combat Command in 1992.

== Geography ==
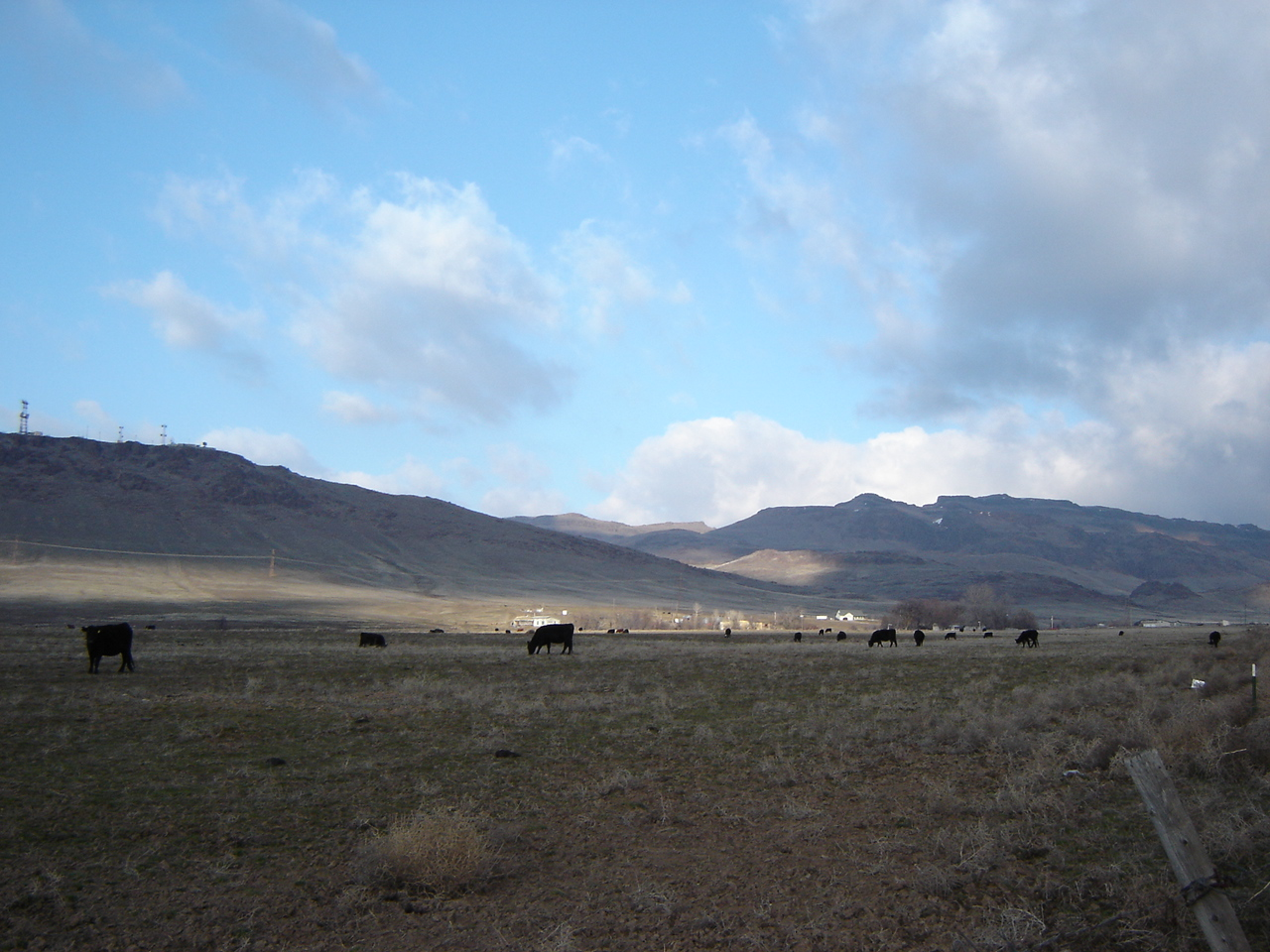
Foothills bordering the Danskin Mountains and Mount Bennett Hills. Rattlesnake Station was founded in this area.

According to the United States Census Bureau, the city has a total area of 6.36 square miles (16.47 km^{2}), of which 6.07 square miles (15.72 km^{2}) is land and 0.29 square miles (0.75 km^{2}) is water.

About 8 mi (13 km) to the northwest are the Crater Rings, a National Natural Landmark.

Mountain Home experiences a semi-arid climate (Köppen BSk) with short, cold winters and hot, dry summers.

Climate data for Mountain Home, Idaho, 1991–2020 normals, extremes 1906–present
Month	Jan	Feb	Mar	Apr	May	Jun	Jul	Aug	Sep	Oct	Nov	Dec	Year
Record high °F (°C)	66 (19)	72 (22)	82 (28)	94 (34)	107 (42)	109 (43)	115 (46)	109 (43)	107 (42)	94 (34)	79 (26)	67 (19)	115 (46)
Mean maximum °F (°C)	52.0 (11.1)	59.5 (15.3)	71.6 (22.0)	81.9 (27.7)	91.9 (33.3)	99.9 (37.7)	106.6 (41.4)	103.7 (39.8)	97.4 (36.3)	84.3 (29.1)	64.8 (18.2)	54.4 (12.4)	107.0 (41.7)
Mean daily maximum °F (°C)	40.0 (4.4)	46.6 (8.1)	55.7 (13.2)	62.8 (17.1)	73.7 (23.2)	84.1 (28.9)	95.0 (35.0)	93.2 (34.0)	81.9 (27.7)	67.1 (19.5)	50.1 (10.1)	39.1 (3.9)	65.8 (18.8)
Daily mean °F (°C)	31.7 (−0.2)	36.2 (2.3)	43.0 (6.1)	49.4 (9.7)	59.1 (15.1)	68.0 (20.0)	77.3 (25.2)	75.4 (24.1)	64.9 (18.3)	51.9 (11.1)	39.3 (4.1)	31.2 (−0.4)	52.3 (11.3)
Mean daily minimum °F (°C)	23.4 (−4.8)	25.9 (−3.4)	30.4 (−0.9)	35.9 (2.2)	44.6 (7.0)	51.9 (11.1)	59.6 (15.3)	57.6 (14.2)	48.0 (8.9)	36.7 (2.6)	28.4 (−2.0)	23.4 (−4.8)	38.8 (3.8)
Mean minimum °F (°C)	7.1 (−13.8)	11.9 (−11.2)	18.4 (−7.6)	23.1 (−4.9)	29.9 (−1.2)	37.3 (2.9)	48.0 (8.9)	45.2 (7.3)	33.8 (1.0)	21.4 (−5.9)	12.4 (−10.9)	6.5 (−14.2)	1.1 (−17.2)
Record low °F (°C)	−29 (−34)	−18 (−28)	4 (−16)	1 (−17)	15 (−9)	20 (−7)	29 (−2)	26 (−3)	9 (−13)	7 (−14)	−10 (−23)	−36 (−38)	−36 (−38)
Average precipitation inches (mm)	1.14 (29)	0.86 (22)	1.20 (30)	1.03 (26)	1.26 (32)	0.59 (15)	0.21 (5.3)	0.13 (3.3)	0.50 (13)	0.81 (21)	1.26 (32)	1.56 (40)	10.55 (268.6)
Average snowfall inches (cm)	1.8 (4.6)	1.7 (4.3)	0.4 (1.0)	0.0 (0.0)	0.0 (0.0)	0.0 (0.0)	0.0 (0.0)	0.0 (0.0)	0.0 (0.0)	trace	1.8 (4.6)	4.6 (12)	10.3 (26.5)
Average precipitation days (≥ 0.01 in)	8.3	6.9	9.1	7.4	5.8	4.5	1.9	1.4	3.3	4.9	9.6	9.4	72.5
Average snowy days (≥ 0.1 in)	1.7	1.4	0.3	0.0	0.0	0.0	0.0	0.0	0.0	0.0	1.3	2.3	7.0
Source 1: NOAA (snow/snow days 1981–2010)
Source 2: XMACIS2

=== Highways ===
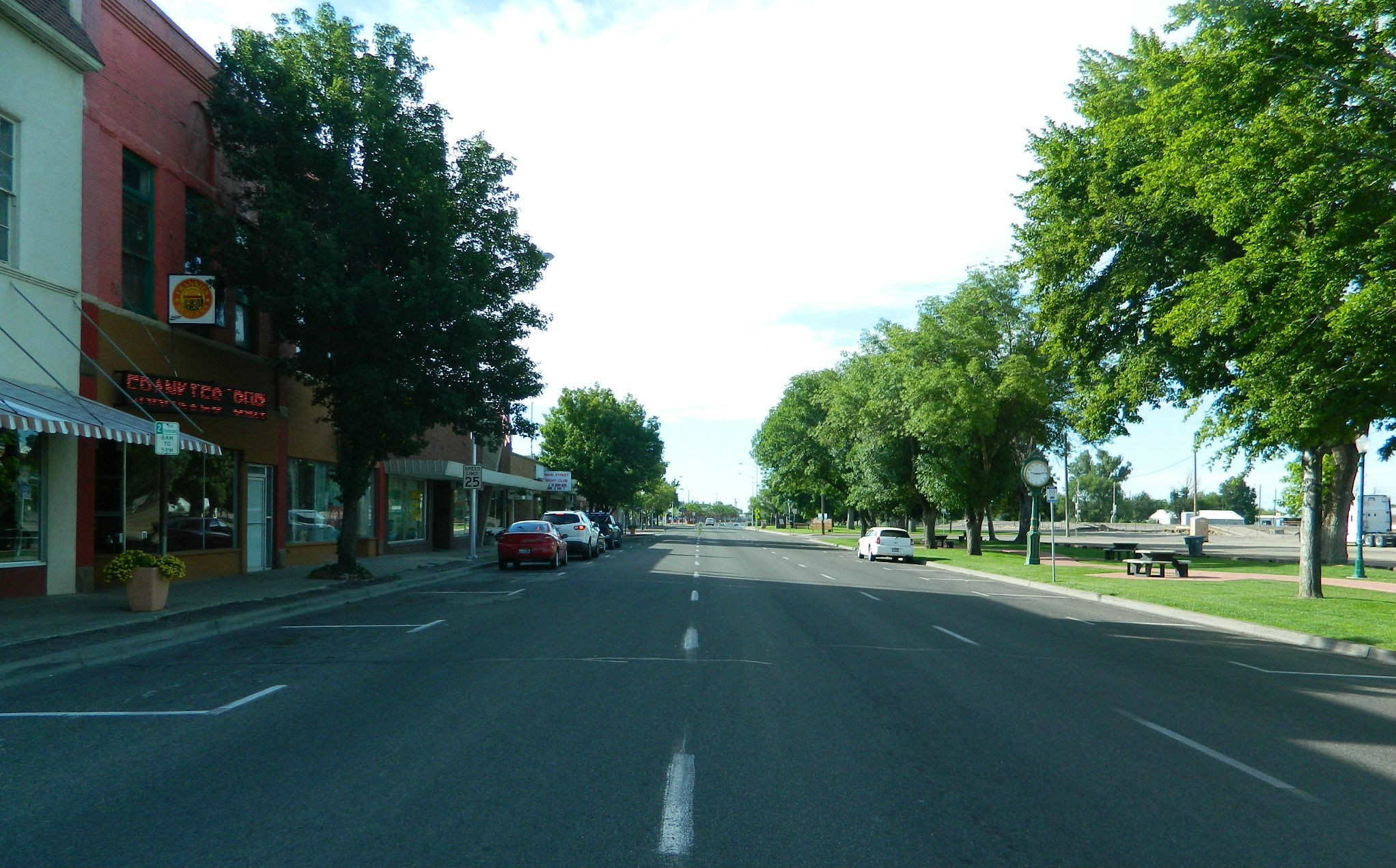
A main street in the city

- - Interstate 84 bypasses the city, running about a mile east; it links with Boise 45 miles (72 km) to the northwest and Twin Falls 86 miles (138 km) to the southeast.
- - US 20 splits from I-84 at exit 95, heading eastbound toward Fairfield and over to Idaho Falls in eastern Idaho.
- - US 26 and US 30 follow Interstate 84 through the city.
- - SH-51 heads south-southwest towards Bruneau and on to Elko, Nevada, changing to Nevada State Route 225 midway through the Duck Valley Indian Reservation.
- - SH-67 heads west-southwest toward the air base and on to Grand View via SH-167.

== Demographics ==
Historical population
Census	Pop.	Note	%±
1890	233		—
1900	529		127.0%
1910	1,411		166.7%
1920	1,644		16.5%
1930	1,243		−24.4%
1940	1,193		−4.0%
1950	1,887		58.2%
1960	5,984		217.1%
1970	6,451		7.8%
1980	7,540		16.9%
1990	7,913		4.9%
2000	11,143		40.8%
2010	14,206		27.5%
2020	15,979		12.5%
U.S. Decennial Census

=== 2020 census ===
As of the 2020 census, Mountain Home had a population of 15,979. The median age was 32.5 years. 25.5% of residents were under the age of 18 and 13.5% of residents were 65 years of age or older. For every 100 females there were 105.4 males, and for every 100 females age 18 and over there were 104.5 males age 18 and over.

99.5% of residents lived in urban areas, while 0.5% lived in rural areas.

There were 6,248 households in Mountain Home, of which 33.2% had children under the age of 18 living in them. Of all households, 48.0% were married-couple households, 22.2% were households with a male householder and no spouse or partner present, and 22.7% were households with a female householder and no spouse or partner present. About 27.5% of all households were made up of individuals and 9.7% had someone living alone who was 65 years of age or older.

There were 3,358 families in the city. The average household size was 2.31 and the average family size was 3.01.

There were 6,597 housing units, of which 5.3% were vacant. The homeowner vacancy rate was 2.0% and the rental vacancy rate was 3.9%.

The population density was 2,636.8 inhabitants per square mile (1,018.1/km^{2}), and there were 1,088.6 per square mile (420.3/km^{2}) housing units per square mile.

Racial composition as of the 2020 census
Race	Number	Percent
White	11,979	75.0%
Black or African American	416	2.6%
American Indian and Alaska Native	194	1.2%
Asian	474	3.0%
Native Hawaiian and Other Pacific Islander	59	0.4%
Some other race	1,056	6.6%
Two or more races	1,801	11.3%
Hispanic or Latino (of any race)	2,540	15.9%

=== 2010 census ===
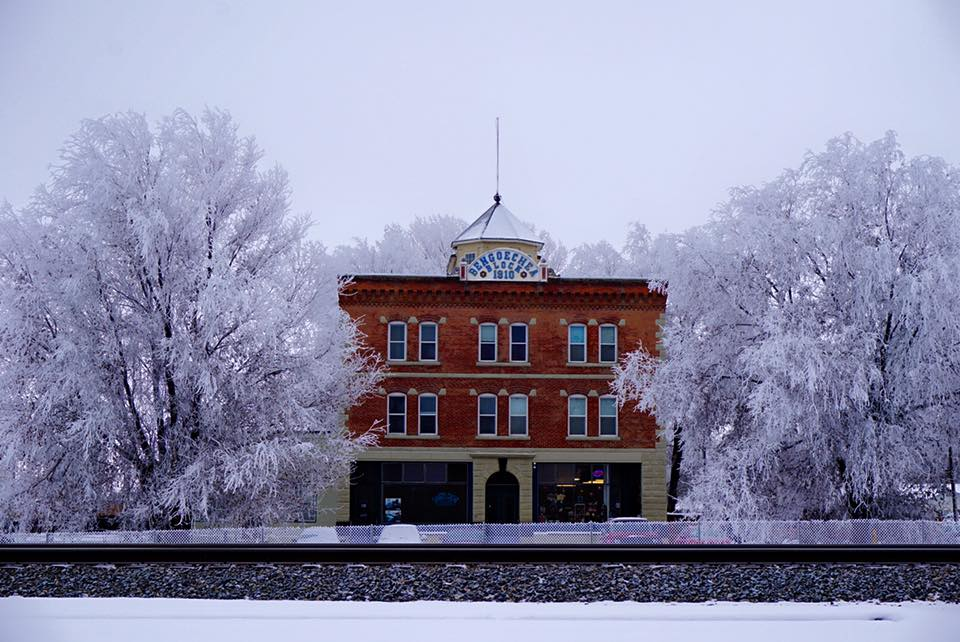
Bengoechea Hotel

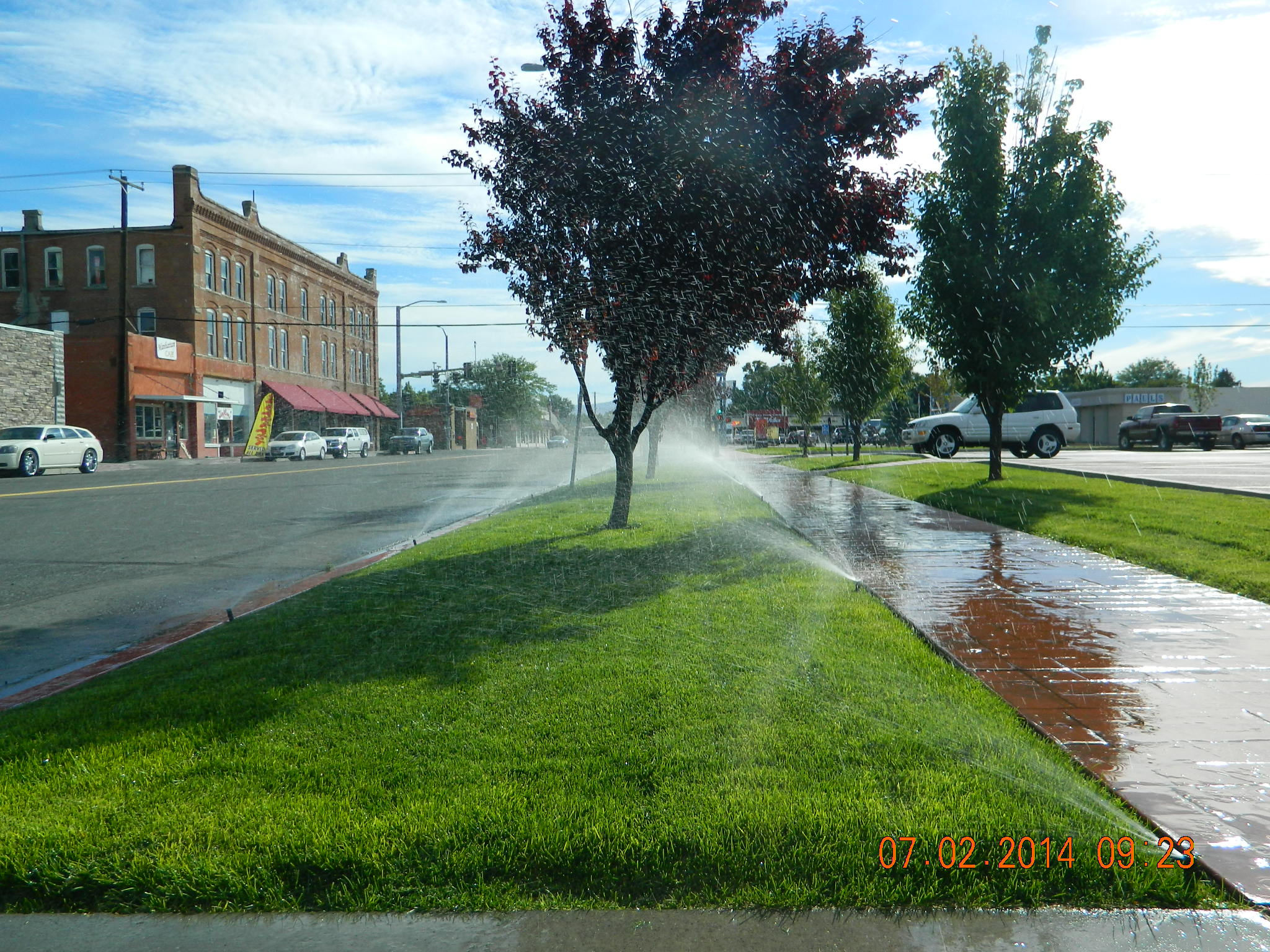
East Jackson Street, Mountain Home

At the 2010 census, there were 14,206 people, 5,648 households and 3,686 families living in the city. The population density was 2,340.4 inhabitants per square mile (903.6/km^{2}). There were 6,249 housing units at an average density of 1,029.5 per square mile (397.5/km^{2}). The racial makeup of the city was 75.0% White, 2.6% African American, 1.2% Native American, 3.0% Asian, 0.6% Pacific Islander, 4.8% from other races, and 4.4% from two or more races. Hispanic or Latino people of any race were 11.9% of the population.

There were 5,648 households, of which 36.9% had children under the age of 18 living with them, 50.0% were married couples living together, 10.9% had a female householder with no husband present, 4.4% had a male householder with no wife present, and 34.7% were non-families. 27.6% of all households were made up of individuals, and 8.1% had someone living alone who was 65 years of age or older. The average household size was 2.49 and the average family size was 3.06.

The median age in the city was 29.8 years. 27.9% of residents were under the age of 18; 12.4% were between the ages of 18 and 24; 29.1% were from 25 to 44; 20.7% were from 45 to 64; and 9.9% were 65 years of age or older. The gender makeup of the city was 51.3% male and 48.7% female.

=== 2000 census ===
At the 2000 census, there were 11,143 people, 4,337 households and 2,957 families living in the city. The population density was 2,150.8 inhabitants per square mile (830.4/km^{2}). There were 4,738 housing units at an average density of 914.5 per square mile (353.1/km^{2}). The racial makeup of the city was 87.89% White, 2.61% African American, 0.94% Native American, 1.73% Asian, 0.31% Pacific Islander, 3.41% from other races, and 3.11% from two or more races. Hispanic or Latino people of any race were 8.33% of the population.

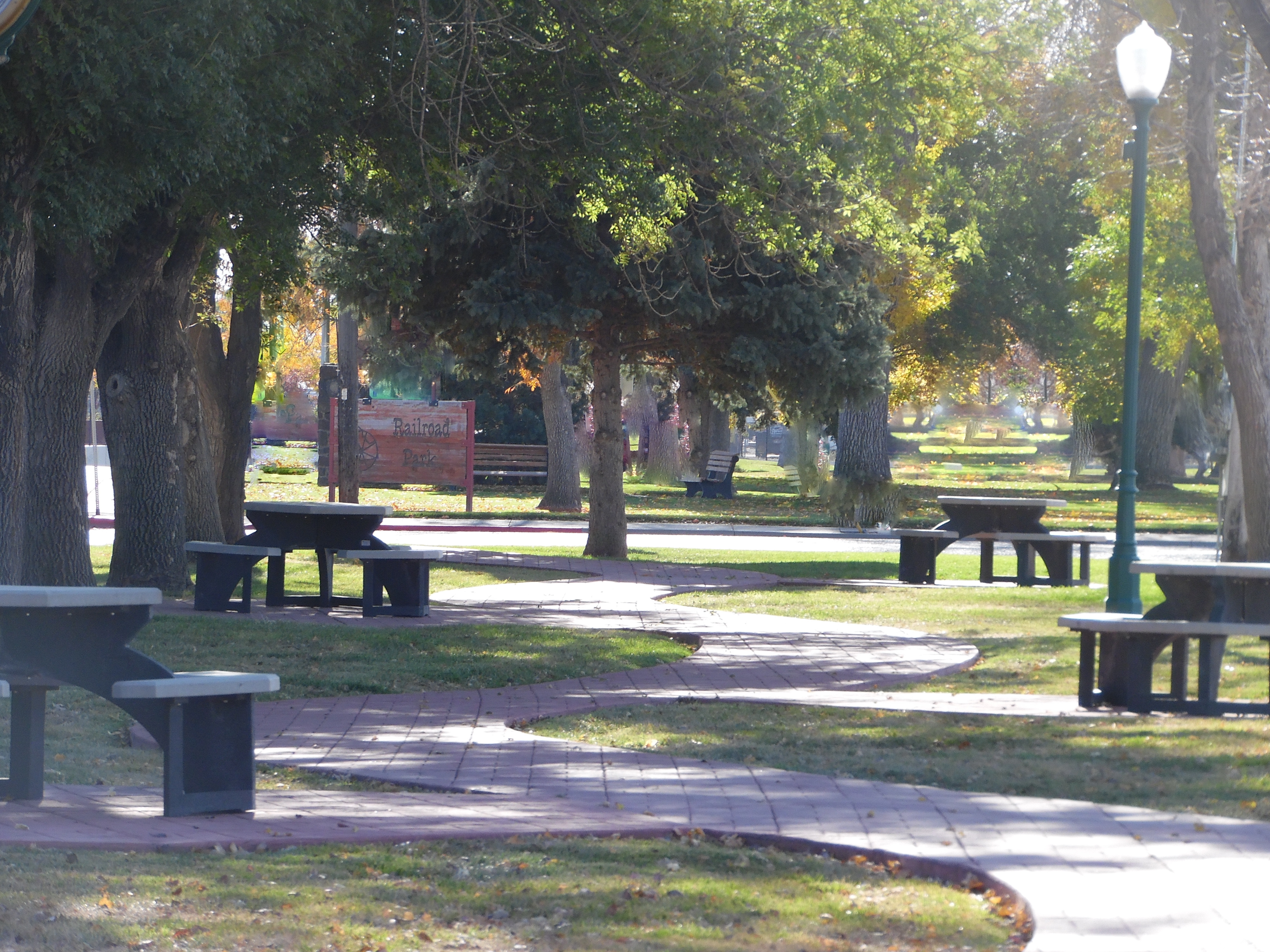
Railroad Park

There were 4,337 households, of which 36.8% had children under the age of 18 living with them, 55.7% were married couples living together, 9.0% had a female householder with no husband present, and 31.8% were non-families. 26.6% of all households were made up of individuals, and 7.4% had someone living alone who was 65 years of age or older. The average household size was 2.54 and the average family size was 3.11.

29.6% of the population were under the age of 18, 9.8% from 18 to 24, 32.8% from 25 to 44, 18.1% from 45 to 64, and 9.7% who were 65 years of age or older. The median age was 32 years. For every 100 females, there were 101.0 males. For every 100 females age 18 and over, there were 99.5 males.

The median household income was $37,307 and the median family income was $41,485. Males had a median income of $28,724 and females $21,905. The per capita income was $17,029. About 8.6% of families and 10.4% of the population were below the poverty line, including 13.9% of those under age 18 and 11.8% of those age 65 or over.

== Education ==
The school district is Mountain Home School District 193. Mountain Home High School is the comprehensive high school.

== Transportation ==
Mountain Home Municipal Airport is in the community.

== Notable people ==
- Korey Hall – NFL player
- Charlotte Lamberton – deaf vaudeville and ballroom dancer
- Richard McKenna – novelist
- Ford Rainey – actor
- James F. Reilly – former NASA astronaut and geologist
- Victor Wooten – musician
