= Marsing, Idaho =

City in Owhyee County, Idaho, United States

- City
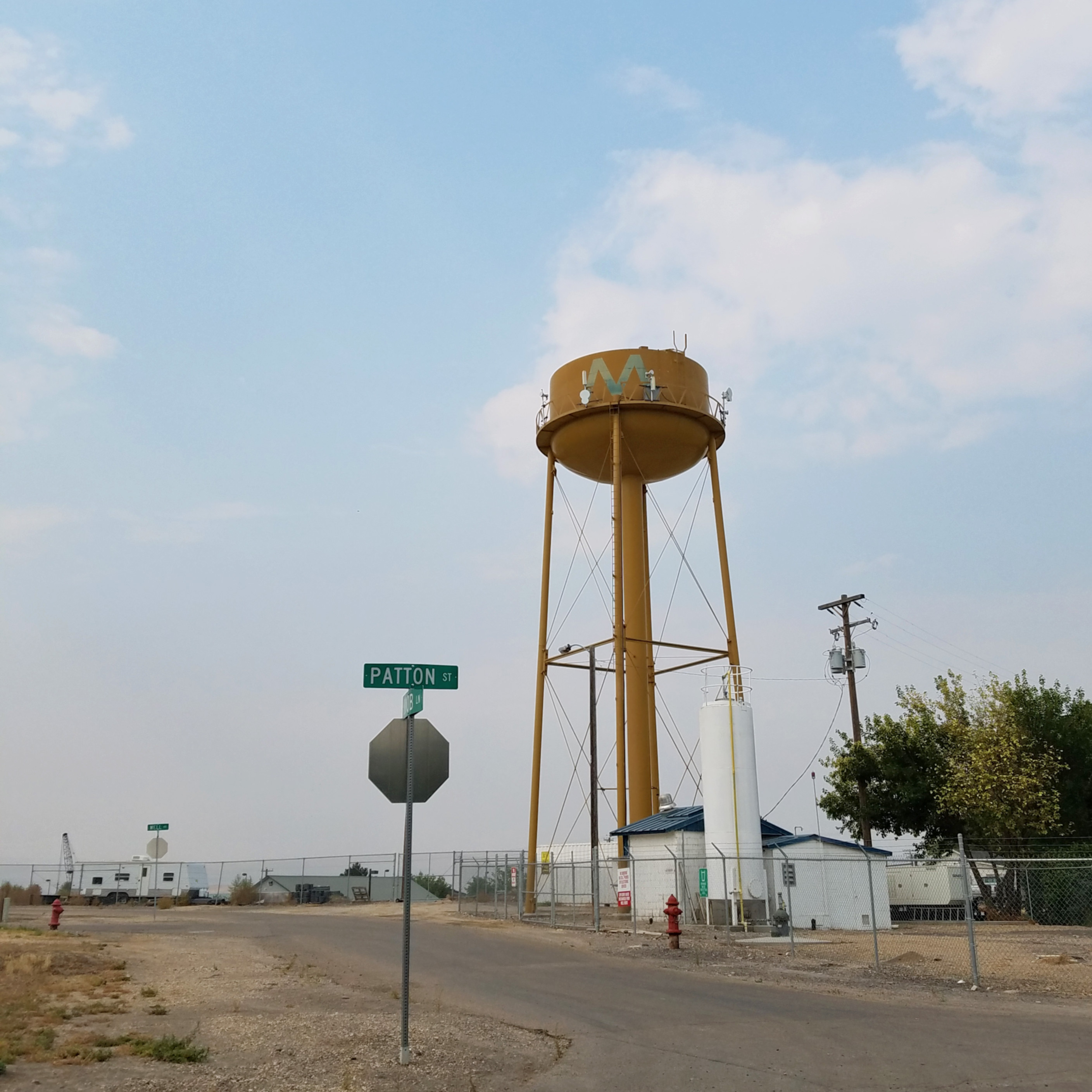
- Marsing water tower, August 2018

- Location of Marsing in Owyhee County, Idaho
- Coordinates: 43°32′48″N 116°48′34″W
- Country: United States
- State: Idaho
- County: Owyhee

Area
  - Total: 0.69 sq mi (1.79 km^{2})
  - Land: 0.68 sq mi (1.76 km^{2})
  - Water: 0.012 sq mi (0.03 km^{2})
- Elevation: 2,267 ft (691 m)

Population (2020)
  - Total: 1,229
  - Density: 1,936.5/sq mi (747.69/km^{2})
- Time zone: UTC-7 (Mountain (MST))
  - Summer (DST): UTC-6 (MDT)
- ZIP code: 83639
- Area codes: 208, 986
- FIPS code: 16-50950
- GNIS feature ID: 2411042
- Website: cityofmarsing.org

Marsing is a city in Owyhee County, Idaho, United States. As of the 2020 census, Marsing had a population of 1,229. It is part of the Boise metropolitan area.

== Geography ==
Marsing is on the Snake River, which forms the border with Canyon County.

According to the United States Census Bureau, the city has a total area of 0.69 square miles (1.79 km^{2}), of which 0.68 square miles (1.76 km^{2}) is land and 0.01 square miles (0.03 km^{2}) is water.

== Highways ==
State Highway 55 connects the city with Canyon County and continues to Nampa to the northeast. Two miles (3 km) west of Marsing, Highway 55 connects with U.S. Route 95, the primary north–south route for the state and its primary connection to western Nevada and northern California. State Highway 78 heads southeast to Murphy and Grand View within Owyhee County.

== Demographics ==
Historical population
| Census | Pop. | Note | %± |
|---|---|---|---|
| 1950 | 643 | | — |
| 1960 | 555 | | −13.7% |
| 1970 | 610 | | 9.9% |
| 1980 | 786 | | 28.9% |
| 1990 | 798 | | 1.5% |
| 2000 | 890 | | 11.5% |
| 2010 | 1,031 | | 15.8% |
| 2020 | 1,229 | | 19.2% |
| 2019 (est.) | 1,318 | | 27.8% |
U.S. Decennial Census

=== 2020 census ===
As of the 2020 census, Marsing had a population of 1,229. The median age was 34.7 years. 29.0% of residents were under the age of 18 and 13.1% of residents were 65 years of age or older. For every 100 females there were 105.2 males, and for every 100 females age 18 and over there were 99.1 males age 18 and over.

0.0% of residents lived in urban areas, while 100.0% lived in rural areas.

There were 419 households in Marsing, of which 43.0% had children under the age of 18 living in them. Of all households, 52.0% were married-couple households, 17.9% were households with a male householder and no spouse or partner present, and 24.6% were households with a female householder and no spouse or partner present. About 21.0% of all households were made up of individuals and 9.1% had someone living alone who was 65 years of age or older.

There were 487 housing units, of which 14.0% were vacant. The homeowner vacancy rate was 6.0% and the rental vacancy rate was 9.3%.

Racial composition as of the 2020 census
| Race | Number | Percent |
|---|---|---|
| White | 728 | 59.2% |
| Black or African American | 8 | 0.7% |
| American Indian and Alaska Native | 9 | 0.7% |
| Asian | 2 | 0.2% |
| Native Hawaiian and Other Pacific Islander | 1 | 0.1% |
| Some other race | 253 | 20.6% |
| Two or more races | 228 | 18.6% |
| Hispanic or Latino (of any race) | 534 | 43.4% |

=== 2010 census ===
As of the census of 2010, there were 1,031 people, 371 households, and 266 families living in the city. The population density was 1,516.2 inhabitants per square mile (585.4/km^{2}). There were 403 housing units at an average density of 592.6 per square mile (228.8/km^{2}). The racial makeup of the city was 74.9% White, 1.6% Native American, 0.4% Asian, 20.6% from other races, and 2.6% from two or more races. Hispanic or Latino of any race were 33.8% of the population.

There were 371 households, of which 39.9% had children under the age of 18 living with them, 54.4% were married couples living together, 12.7% had a female householder with no husband present, 4.6% had a male householder with no wife present, and 28.3% were non-families. 24.8% of all households were made up of individuals, and 10.5% had someone living alone who was 65 years of age or older. The average household size was 2.78, and the average family size was 3.37.

The median age in the city was 35.4 years. 29.5% of residents were under the age of 18; 8.4% were between the ages of 18 and 24; 22.8% were from 25 to 44; 26.1% were from 45 to 64; and 13.1% were 65 years of age or older. The gender makeup of the city was 49.8% male and 50.2% female.

=== 2000 census ===
As of the census of 2000, there were 890 people, 332 households, and 235 families living in the city. The population density was 1,331.0 inhabitants per square mile (513.9/km^{2}). There were 366 housing units at an average density of 547.4 per square mile (211.4/km^{2}). The racial makeup of the city was 74.04% White, 0.45% African American, 1.12% Native American, 0.22% Asian, 0.11% Pacific Islander, 22.36% from other races, and 1.69% from two or more races. Hispanic or Latino of any race were 26.97% of the population.

There were 332 households, out of which 32.8% had children under the age of 18 living with them, 52.7% were married couples living together, 14.5% had a female householder with no husband present, and 29.2% were non-families. 24.4% of all households were made up of individuals, and 12.0% had someone living alone who was 65 years of age or older. The average household size was 2.68 and the average family size was 3.24.

In the city, the population was spread out, with 29.0% under the age of 18, 10.2% from 18 to 24, 24.6% from 25 to 44, 19.3% from 45 to 64, and 16.9% who were 65 years of age or older. The median age was 35 years. For every 100 females, there were 105.1 males. For every 100 females age 18 and over, there were 94.5 males.

The median income for a household in the city was $27,639, and the median income for a family was $32,667. Males had a median income of $23,036 versus $16,786 for females. The per capita income for the city was $13,273. About 12.5% of families and 17.0% of the population were below the poverty line, including 27.2% of those under age 18 and 13.9% of those age 65 or over.

== Notable people ==
- Rodney A. Hawes Jr., business executive, philanthropist, and investor
- Shea McClellin, former NFL player

== Education ==
The school district is Marsing Joint School District 363.

== See also ==
- List of cities in Idaho
