= Boise metropolitan area =

Boise Metropolitan Area
- Metropolitan Statistical Area
- Boise City, ID Metropolitan Statistical Area
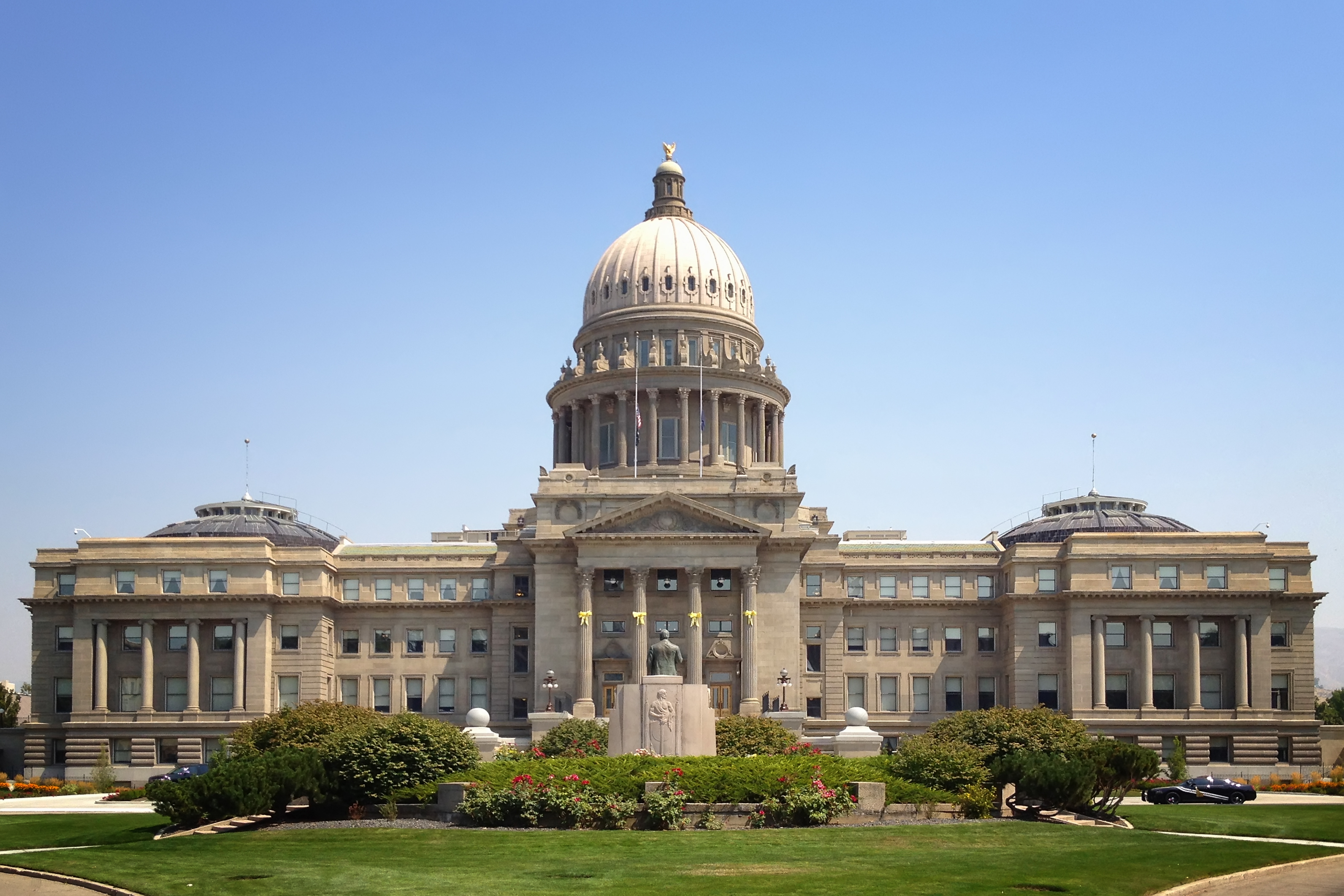
- Idaho State Capitol 2024
Map of Boise–Mountain Home–Ontario, ID–OR CSA
Boise, ID MSA
City of Boise
City of Meridian
City of Nampa
City of Caldwell
Ontario, OR–ID µSA
Mountain Home, ID µSA
- Coordinates: 43°30′N 116°30′W
- Country: United States
- State: Idaho; Oregon
- Largest city: Boise
- Other cities: Meridian; Nampa; Caldwell; Eagle; Kuna; Mountain Home; Ontario, OR; Payette

Area
  - Total: 11,833.06 sq mi (30,647.5 km^{2})
- Highest elevation: 10,751 ft (3,277 m)
- Lowest elevation: 2,000 ft (610 m)

Population (2024)
  - Total: 865,000
  - Rank: 74th in the U.S.
  - Density: 52.11/sq mi (20.118/km^{2})

GDP
  - MSA: $49.947 billion (2022)
- Time zone: UTC-7 (MST)
  - Summer (DST): UTC-6 (MDT)

Historical population
Census	Pop.	Note	%±
1900	27,034		—
1910	63,705		135.6%
1920	75,088		17.9%
1930	82,224		9.5%
1940	108,917		32.5%
1950	141,059		29.5%
1960	168,270		19.3%
1970	191,090		13.6%
1980	280,035		46.5%
1990	319,596		14.1%
2000	464,840		45.4%
2010	616,561		32.6%
2020	764,718		24.0%
2024 (est.)	865,000		13.1%

The Boise, Idaho Metropolitan Statistical Area (MSA) (commonly known as the Boise Metropolitan Area or the Treasure Valley) is an area that encompasses Ada, Boise, Canyon, Gem, and Owyhee counties in southwestern Idaho, anchored by the cities of Boise and Nampa. It is the main component of the wider Boise–Mountain Home–Ontario, ID–OR Combined Statistical Area, which adds Elmore and Payette counties in Idaho and Malheur County, Oregon. It is the state's largest officially designated metropolitan area and includes Idaho's three largest cities: Boise, Nampa, and Meridian. Nearly 40 percent of Idaho's total population lives in the area.

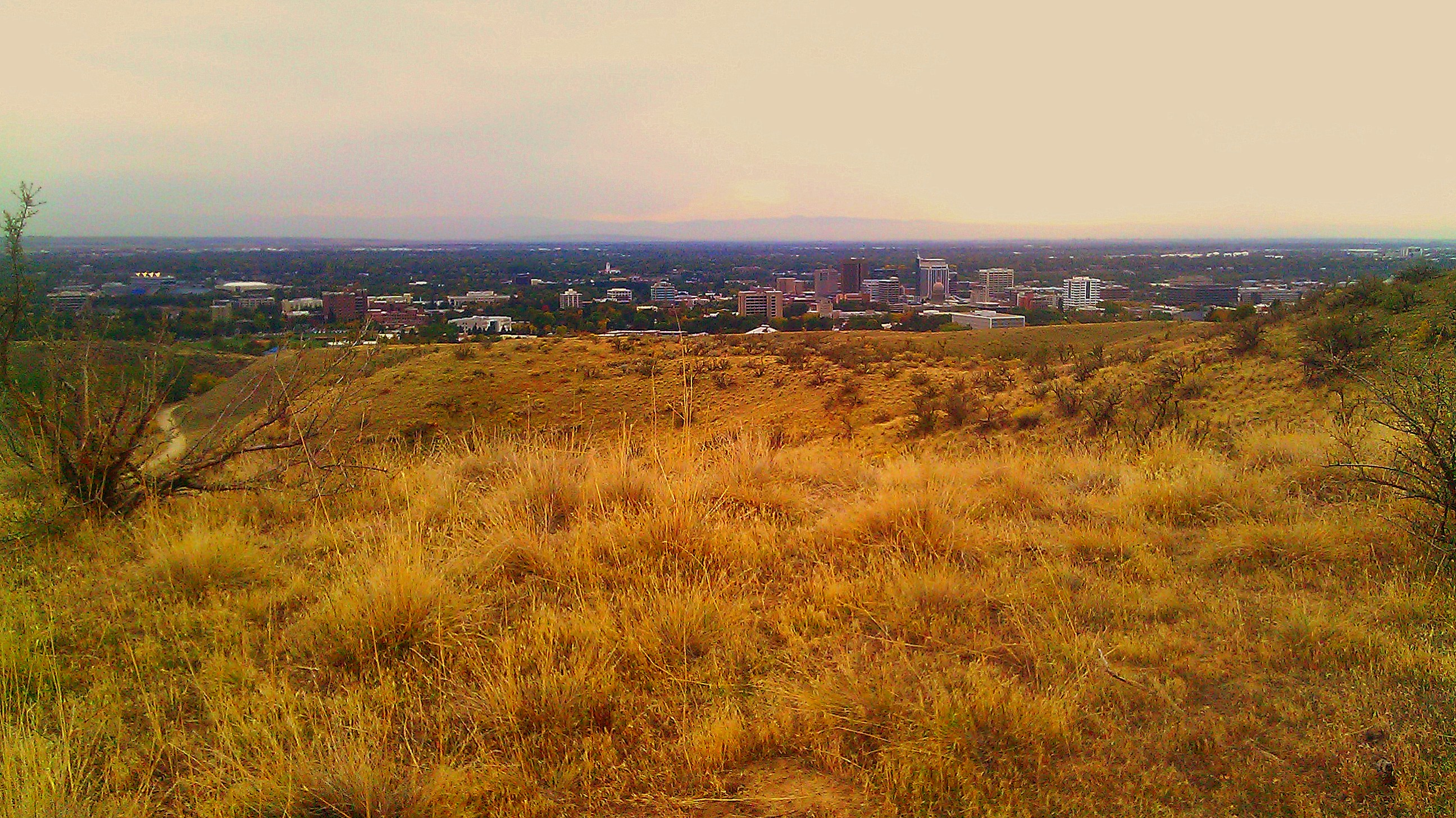
Boise, from its foothills

As of the 2021 estimate, the Boise–Nampa, Idaho Metropolitan Statistical Area (MSA) had a population of 795,268, while the larger Boise City–Mountain Home–Ontario, ID–OR Combined Statistical Area (CSA) had a population of 850,341. The metro area is currently the third largest in the U.S. section of the Pacific Northwest after Seattle and Portland, and is the 74th-largest metropolitan area in the United States.

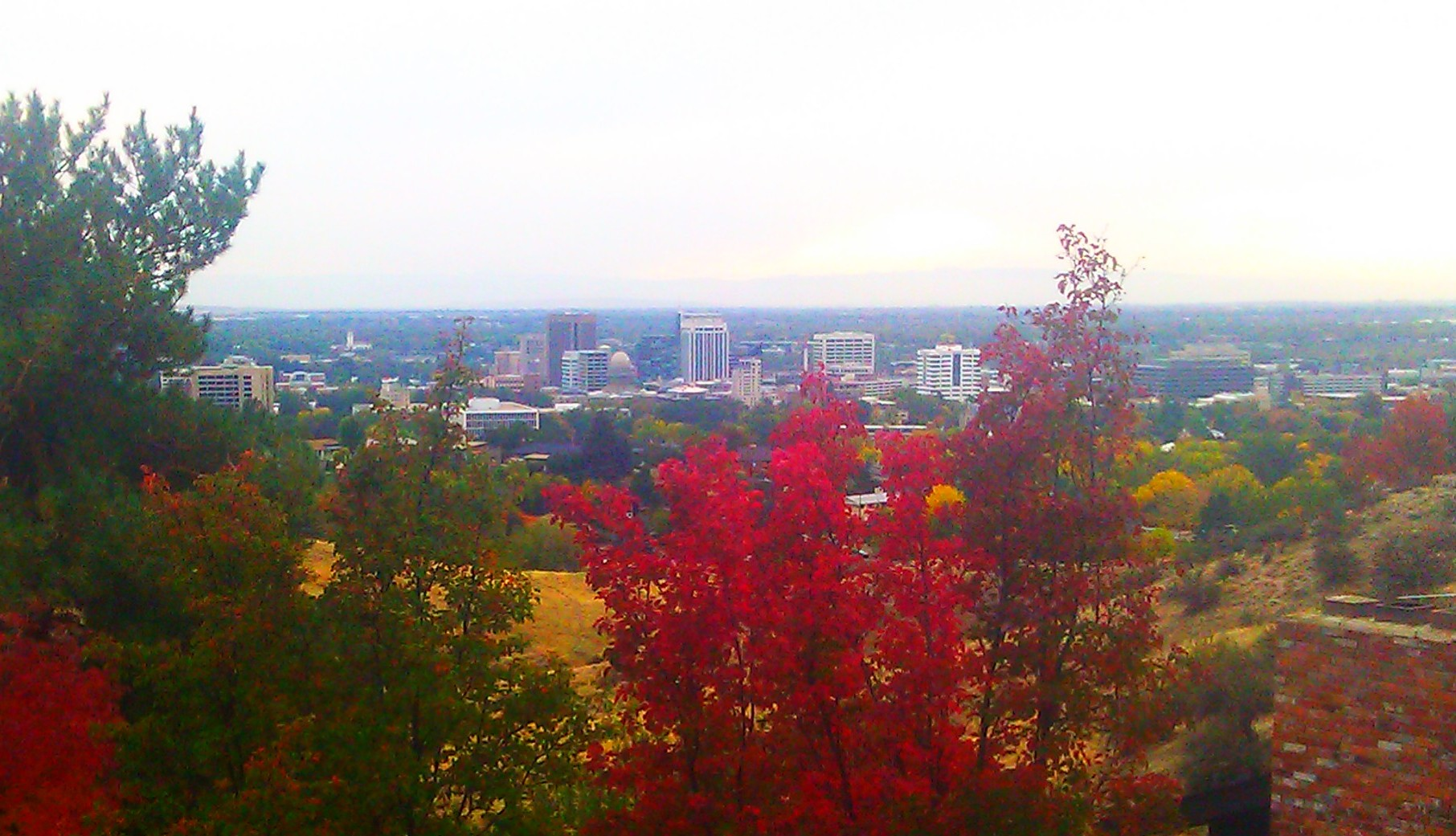
Downtown Boise in 2013

== Counties ==
- Ada
- Boise
- Canyon
- Elmore
- Gem
- Owyhee
- Payette
- Malheur (Oregon)

== Demographics ==
As of the 2010 census, there were 616,561 people, 170,291 households, and 120,118 families residing within the MSA. The racial makeup of the MSA was 89.80% White, 0.52% African American, 0.80% Native American, 1.38% Asian, 0.14% Pacific Islander, 5.02% from other races, and 2.35% from two or more races. Hispanic or Latino of any race were 8.96% of the population.

The median income for a household in the MSA was $36,695, and the median income for a family was $42,196. Males had a median income of $31,854 versus $23,244 for females. The per capita income for the MSA was $17,041.

Population
County	2025	2020	2010	2000	1990	1980	1970	1960	1950	1940	1930	1920	1910
Ada	546,141	494,967	392,365	300,904	205,775	173,036	112,230	93,460	70,649	50,401	37,925	35,213	29,088
Boise	8,545	7,610	7,028	6,670	3,509	2,999	1,763	1,646	1,776	2,333	1,847	1,822	5,250
Canyon	275,123	231,105	188,923	131,441	90,076	83,756	61,288	57,662	53,597	40,987	30,930	26,932	25,323
Gem	21,773	19,123	16,719	15,181	11,844	11,972	9,387	9,127	8,730	9,544	7,419	6,427	–
Owyhee	12,661	11,913	11,526	10,624	8,392	8,272	6,422	6,375	6,307	5,652	4,103	4,694	4,044
Total	864,243	764,718	616,561	464,840	319,596	280,035	191,030	168,270	141,059	108,917	82,224	75,088	63,705

== Communities ==
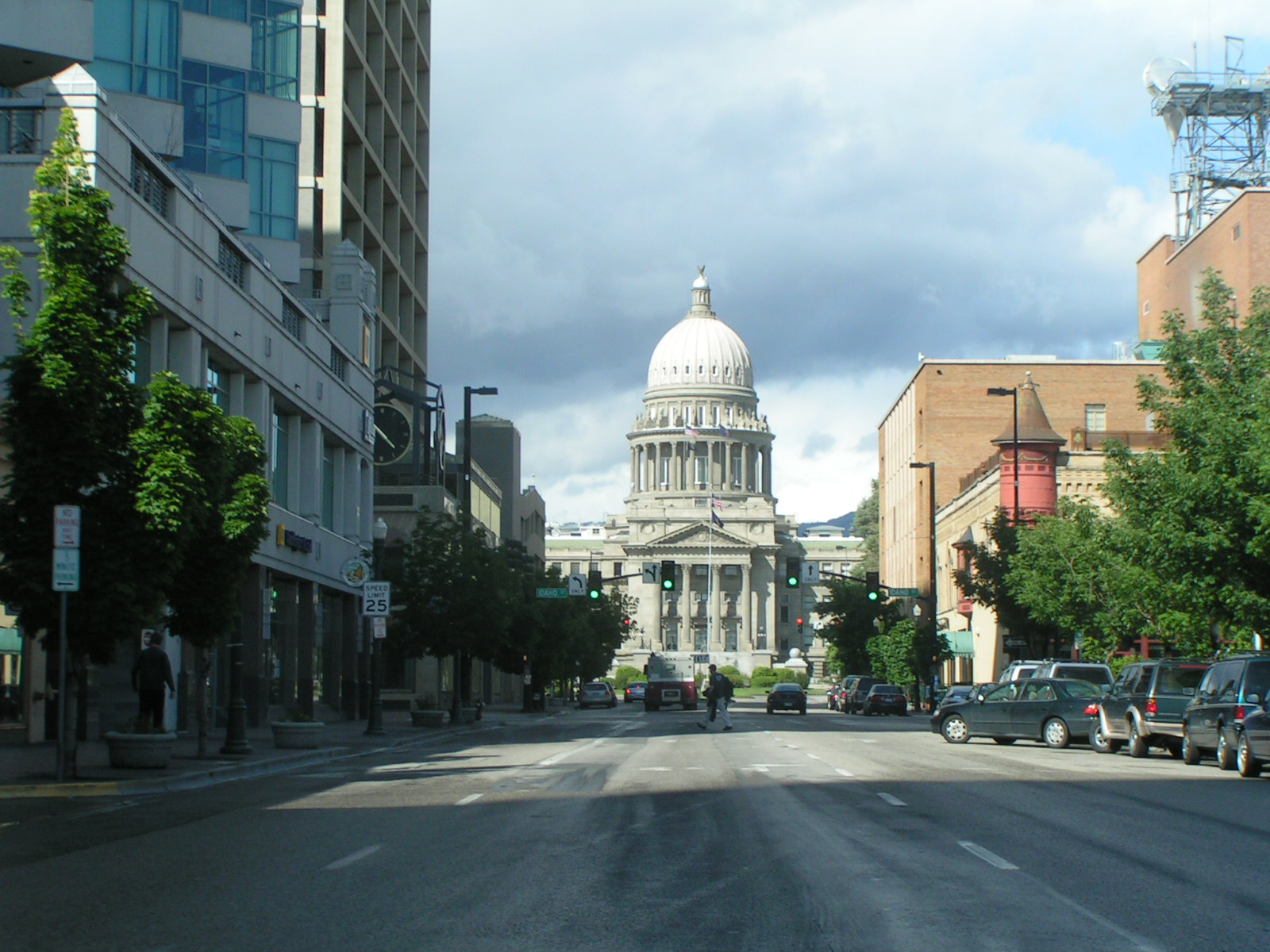
Boise's Capitol Boulevard

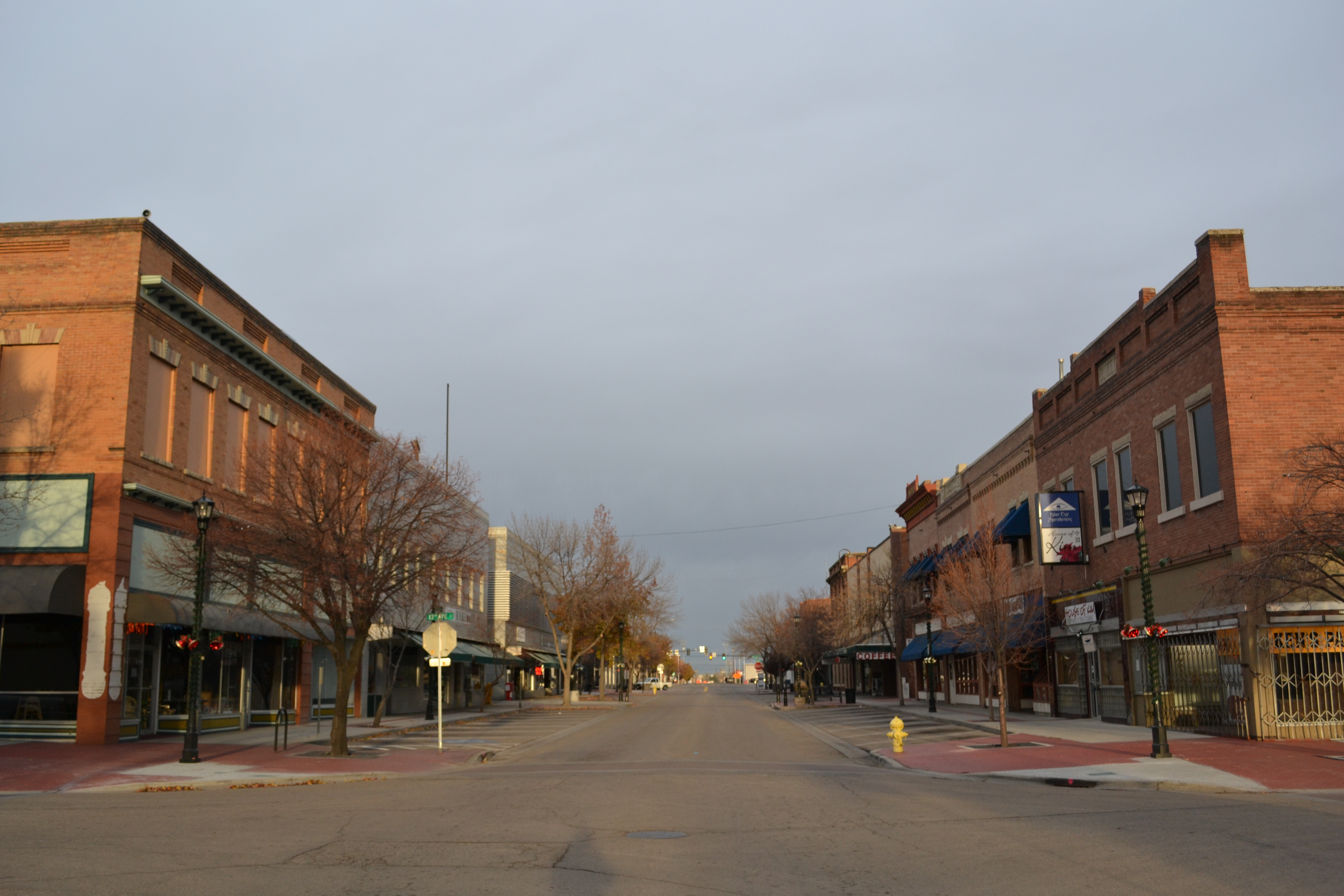
Nampa

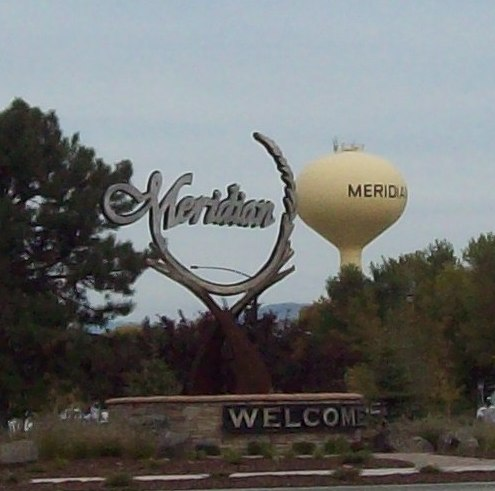
Meridian

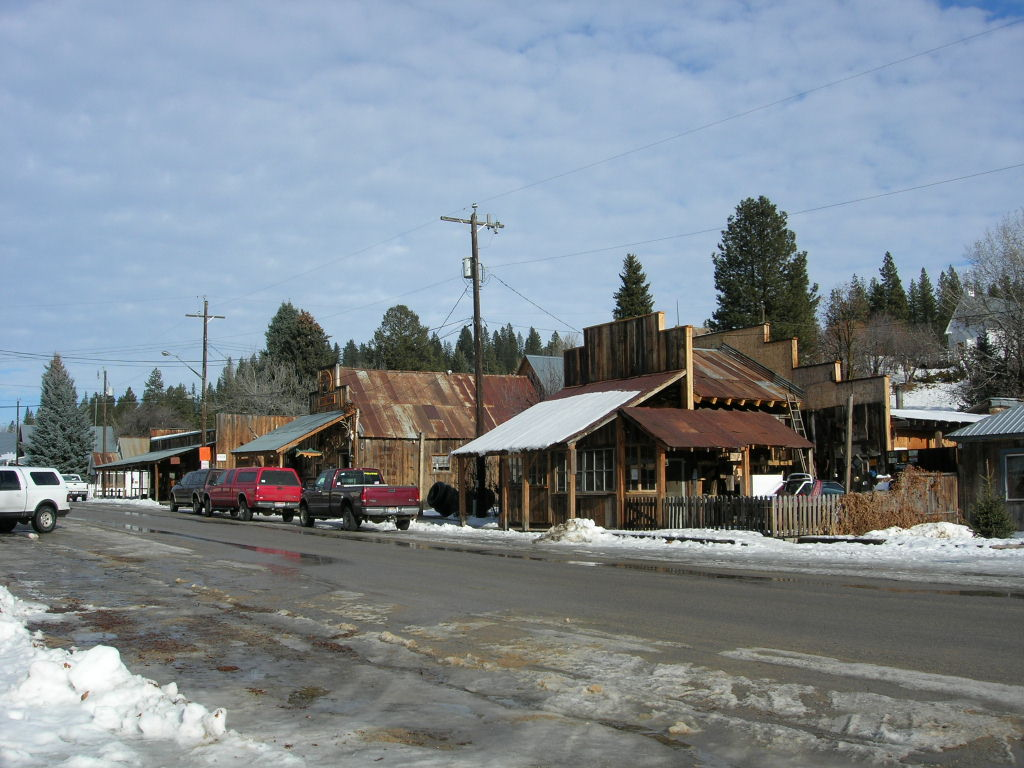
Idaho City

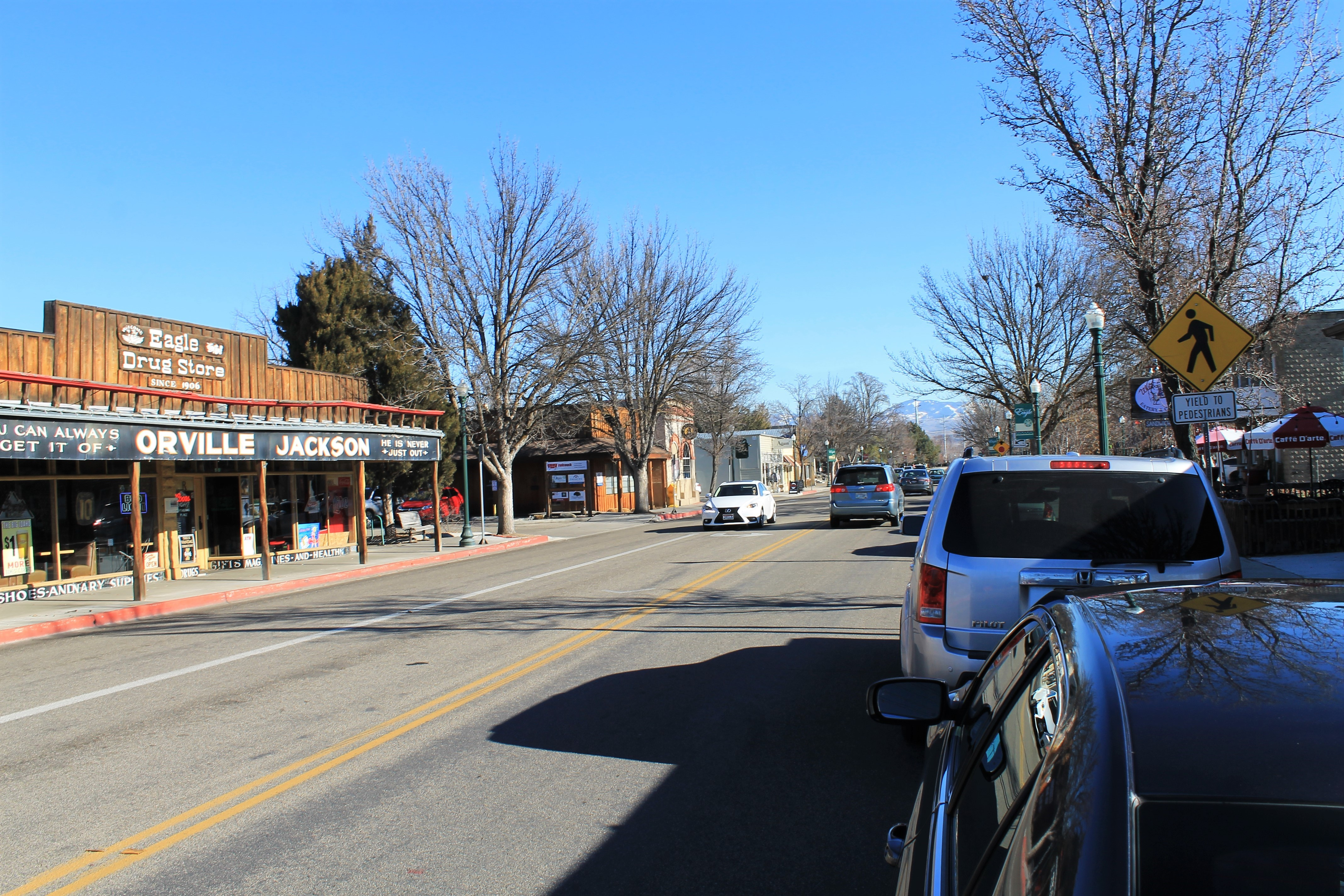
Eagle, Idaho

=== Over 200,000 inhabitants ===
- Boise (principal city)

=== 50,001 to 200,000 inhabitants ===
- Caldwell
- Meridian
- Nampa

=== 10,001 to 50,000 inhabitants ===
- Eagle
- Kuna
- Middleton
- Mountain Home
- Garden City
- Star
- Ontario, Oregon

=== 5,001 to 10,000 inhabitants ===
- Emmett
- Fruitland
- Payette

=== 1,001 to 5,000 inhabitants ===
- Hidden Springs
- Homedale
- Marsing
- New Plymouth
- Nyssa, Oregon
- Parma
- Wilder
- Vale, Oregon

=== 1,000 inhabitants or fewer ===
- Adrian, Oregon
- Crouch
- Greenleaf
- Horseshoe Bend
- Idaho City
- Jordan Valley, Oregon
- Melba
- Notus
- Placerville

=== Unincorporated places ===
- Annex, Oregon
- Arock, Oregon
- Banks
- Basque, Oregon
- Beulah, Oregon
- Bowmont
- Bruneau
- Burns Junction, Oregon
- Cairo, Oregon
- Crowley, Oregon
- Danner, Oregon
- Garden Valley
- Hamilton Corner
- Harper, Oregon
- Huston
- Ironside, Oregon
- Jamieson, Oregon
- Jonesboro, Oregon
- Juntura, Oregon
- Letha
- Lowman
- McDermitt, Nevada-Oregon
- Murphy
- Ola
- Owyhee, Oregon
- Payette Junction, Oregon
- Riddle
- Riverside, Oregon
- Rome, Oregon
- Roswell
- Sunnyslope
- Sweet

== Transportation ==
=== Airports ===
- Boise Airport
- Nampa Municipal Airport
- Caldwell Executive Airport
- Mountain Home Municipal Airport

=== Interstates ===
- Interstate 84
- Interstate 184

=== U.S. highways ===
- U.S. Route 20
- U.S. Route 26
- U.S. Route 30
- U.S. Route 95

=== State highways ===
- State Highway 16
- State Highway 19
- State Highway 21
- State Highway 44
- State Highway 45
- State Highway 51
- State Highway 52
- State Highway 55
- State Highway 67
- State Highway 69
- State Highway 72
- State Highway 78
- State Highway 167
- Oregon Route 52
- Oregon Route 78
- Oregon Route 201
- Oregon Route 451
- Oregon Route 452
- Oregon Route 453
- Oregon Route 454

=== Mass transit ===
- ValleyRide

== Colleges and universities ==
=== Major universities ===
- Boise State University (BSU), Boise, Idaho

=== Four-year colleges and universities ===
- Northwest Nazarene University (NNU), Nampa, Idaho
- The College of Idaho (C of I), Caldwell, Idaho
- University of Idaho (U of I), Boise; Extension Campus
- Idaho State University (ISU), Meridian, Idaho; Extension Campus

=== Community colleges and trade schools ===
- College of Western Idaho, Nampa, Idaho (CWI) Nampa; Main Campus, Aspen Classroom Bldg., Canyon County Extension Boise; Ada County Campus
- Treasure Valley Community College, Caldwell, Idaho (TVCC) Ontario, Oregon; Main Campus Caldwell, Idaho; Caldwell Campus
- Northwest Lineman College (NLC), Kuna, Idaho
- Heavy Equipment Operator School of Idaho, Boise
- Carrington College, Boise
- Broadview University, Meridian, Idaho
- University of Phoenix Meridian; Main Campus
- Boise Bible College, Boise

== Major valley employers ==
- Micron Technology Boise, Nampa
- Saint Luke's Medical Centers Boise, Meridian, Eagle, Nampa
- Saint Alphonsus Regional Medical Centers Boise, Nampa, Caldwell, Ontario
- Simplot Boise, Caldwell
- Hewlett-Packard Garden City / Boise
- Blue Cross Blue Shield Association Meridian
- Union Pacific Railroad Nampa
- T-Mobile US Meridian
- DirecTV Boise
- Teleperformance Boise

== See also ==
- Idaho census statistical areas
