= GYS =

GYS may refer to:

== People ==
- Gys van Beek (1919–2015), Dutch resistance member during World War II
- Leda Gys (1892–1957), Italian film actress
- Robert Gys (1901–1977), French art director

== Other uses ==
- Glycogen synthase
- Great Yorkshire Show, an agricultural show in England
- Guangyuan Panlong Airport, Sichuan, China
- Operation GYS, an Israeli operation conducted during the 1948 Arab–Israeli War
