= Parma, Idaho =

City in Canyon County, Idaho, United States

- City
- Location of Parma in Canyon County, Idaho.
- Coordinates: 43°47′11″N 116°56′34″W
- Country: United States
- State: Idaho
- County: Canyon

Area
  - Total: 1.10 sq mi (2.85 km^{2})
  - Land: 1.08 sq mi (2.80 km^{2})
  - Water: 0.019 sq mi (0.05 km^{2})
- Elevation: 2,238 ft (682 m)

Population (2020)
  - Total: 2,096
  - Density: 1,940/sq mi (749/km^{2})
- Time zone: UTC-7 (Mountain (MST))
  - Summer (DST): UTC-6 (MDT)
- ZIP code: 83660
- Area code: 208
- FIPS code: 16-60940
- GNIS feature ID: 2411377

Parma is a city in Canyon County, Idaho, United States. The population was 2,096 at the 2020 census, up from 1,983 in 2010. It is the fourth largest city in the county (behind Middleton, Caldwell, and Nampa all in the county's eastern portion) and the largest in the rural western portion. It is part of the Boise City–Nampa, Idaho Metropolitan Statistical Area.

The city was named after Parma, Italy.

== Geography ==
According to the United States Census Bureau, the city has a total area of 1.11 square miles (2.87 km^{2}), of which, 1.10 square miles (2.85 km^{2}) is land and 0.01 square miles (0.03 km^{2}) is water.

== Climate ==
According to the Köppen Climate Classification system, Parma has a cold semi-arid climate, abbreviated "BSk" on climate maps. The hottest temperature recorded in Parma was 110 °F (43.3 °C) on July 12–13, 2002, while the coldest temperature recorded was −35 °F (−37.2 °C) on December 25, 1924.

Climate data for Parma, Idaho, 1991–2020 normals, extremes 1922–present
Month	Jan	Feb	Mar	Apr	May	Jun	Jul	Aug	Sep	Oct	Nov	Dec	Year
Record high °F (°C)	65 (18)	67 (19)	84 (29)	94 (34)	100 (38)	106 (41)	110 (43)	107 (42)	103 (39)	95 (35)	78 (26)	68 (20)	110 (43)
Mean maximum °F (°C)	49.6 (9.8)	58.1 (14.5)	69.6 (20.9)	81.0 (27.2)	90.6 (32.6)	97.0 (36.1)	102.6 (39.2)	101.8 (38.8)	95.6 (35.3)	84.7 (29.3)	64.9 (18.3)	52.7 (11.5)	103.5 (39.7)
Mean daily maximum °F (°C)	37.2 (2.9)	45.7 (7.6)	56.9 (13.8)	64.2 (17.9)	73.3 (22.9)	81.4 (27.4)	92.4 (33.6)	91.3 (32.9)	81.6 (27.6)	66.3 (19.1)	48.9 (9.4)	38.2 (3.4)	64.8 (18.2)
Daily mean °F (°C)	30.0 (−1.1)	35.9 (2.2)	44.1 (6.7)	50.3 (10.2)	59.5 (15.3)	66.6 (19.2)	74.7 (23.7)	72.9 (22.7)	63.9 (17.7)	51.0 (10.6)	38.5 (3.6)	30.5 (−0.8)	51.5 (10.8)
Mean daily minimum °F (°C)	22.7 (−5.2)	26.0 (−3.3)	31.3 (−0.4)	36.4 (2.4)	45.7 (7.6)	51.7 (10.9)	57.0 (13.9)	54.6 (12.6)	46.1 (7.8)	35.7 (2.1)	28.0 (−2.2)	22.7 (−5.2)	38.2 (3.4)
Mean minimum °F (°C)	9.3 (−12.6)	13.7 (−10.2)	20.6 (−6.3)	25.2 (−3.8)	31.8 (−0.1)	39.8 (4.3)	46.4 (8.0)	44.0 (6.7)	35.0 (1.7)	22.9 (−5.1)	14.3 (−9.8)	9.2 (−12.7)	3.2 (−16.0)
Record low °F (°C)	−33 (−36)	−25 (−32)	2 (−17)	13 (−11)	22 (−6)	31 (−1)	33 (1)	34 (1)	15 (−9)	9 (−13)	−9 (−23)	−35 (−37)	−35 (−37)
Average precipitation inches (mm)	1.33 (34)	0.81 (21)	0.88 (22)	0.89 (23)	1.37 (35)	0.78 (20)	0.25 (6.4)	0.19 (4.8)	0.64 (16)	0.73 (19)	0.99 (25)	1.12 (28)	9.98 (254.2)
Average snowfall inches (cm)	3.3 (8.4)	1.8 (4.6)	0.4 (1.0)	0.0 (0.0)	0.0 (0.0)	0.0 (0.0)	0.0 (0.0)	0.0 (0.0)	0.0 (0.0)	0.0 (0.0)	1.2 (3.0)	4.8 (12)	11.5 (29)
Average precipitation days (≥ 0.01 in)	10.0	6.7	8.7	8.3	8.3	5.7	2.2	2.1	2.7	5.5	8.6	9.2	78.0
Average snowy days (≥ 0.1 in)	3.0	1.4	0.6	0.0	0.0	0.0	0.0	0.0	0.0	0.0	0.8	3.2	9.0
Source 1: NOAA
Source 2: National Weather Service

== Demographics ==
Historical population
Census	Pop.	Note	%±
1910	338		—
1920	583		72.5%
1930	750		28.6%
1940	1,085		44.7%
1950	1,369		26.2%
1960	1,295		−5.4%
1970	1,228		−5.2%
1980	1,820		48.2%
1990	1,597		−12.3%
2000	1,771		10.9%
2010	1,983		12.0%
2020	2,096		5.7%
U.S. Decennial Census

=== 2020 census ===
As of the 2020 census, Parma had a population of 2,096. The median age was 35.6 years. 28.3% of residents were under the age of 18 and 17.4% of residents were 65 years of age or older. For every 100 females there were 101.2 males, and for every 100 females age 18 and over there were 97.2 males age 18 and over.

0.0% of residents lived in urban areas, while 100.0% lived in rural areas.

There were 690 households in Parma, of which 37.7% had children under the age of 18 living in them. Of all households, 50.4% were married-couple households, 16.1% were households with a male householder and no spouse or partner present, and 25.1% were households with a female householder and no spouse or partner present. About 21.4% of all households were made up of individuals and 12.6% had someone living alone who was 65 years of age or older.

There were 741 housing units, of which 6.9% were vacant. The homeowner vacancy rate was 1.4% and the rental vacancy rate was 8.6%.

Racial composition as of the 2020 census
Race	Number	Percent
White	1,454	69.4%
Black or African American	4	0.2%
American Indian and Alaska Native	26	1.2%
Asian	20	1.0%
Native Hawaiian and Other Pacific Islander	5	0.2%
Some other race	346	16.5%
Two or more races	241	11.5%
Hispanic or Latino (of any race)	655	31.2%

=== 2010 census ===
As of the census of 2010, there were 1,983 people, 710 households, and 506 families living in the city. The population density was 1,802.7 inhabitants per square mile (696.0/km^{2}). There were 779 housing units at an average density of 708.2 per square mile (273.4/km^{2}). The racial makeup of the city was 75.4% White, 0.4% African American, 1.2% Native American, 0.7% Asian, 20.0% from other races, and 2.4% from two or more races. Hispanic or Latino of any race were 31.0% of the population.

There were 710 households, of which 37.3% had children under the age of 18 living with them, 51.7% were married couples living together, 13.5% had a female householder with no husband present, 6.1% had a male householder with no wife present, and 28.7% were non-families. 24.6% of all households were made up of individuals, and 10.2% had someone living alone who was 65 years of age or older. The average household size was 2.77 and the average family size was 3.31.

The median age in the city was 34.9 years. 30.1% of residents were under the age of 18; 7.8% were between the ages of 18 and 24; 24.1% were from 25 to 44; 24.2% were from 45 to 64; and 13.8% were 65 years of age or older. The gender makeup of the city was 50.6% male and 49.4% female.

=== 2000 census ===
As of the census of 2000, there were 1,771 people, 617 households, and 454 families living in the city. The population density was 1,919.5 inhabitants per square mile (741.1/km^{2}). In the 2010 census there were 1,983 There were 676 housing units at an average density of 732.7 per square mile (282.9/km^{2}). The racial makeup of the city was 83.91% White, 0.17% African American, 0.85% Native American, 0.96% Asian, 9.66% from other races, and 4.46% from two or more races. Hispanic or Latino of any race were 27.10% of the population.

There were 617 households, out of which 38.2% had children under the age of 18 living with them, 60.3% were married couples living together, 9.2% had a female householder with no husband present, and 26.4% were non-families. 23.0% of all households were made up of individuals, and 14.1% had someone living alone who was 65 years of age or older. The average household size was 2.85 and the average family size was 3.41.

In the city, the population was spread out, with 31.4% under the age of 18, 7.8% from 18 to 24, 26.9% from 25 to 44, 19.1% from 45 to 64, and 14.9% who were 65 years of age or older. The median age was 33 years. For every 100 females, there were 97.9 males. For every 100 females age 18 and over, there were 94.7 males.

The median income for a household in the city was $31,964, and the median income for a family was $36,336. Males had a median income of $26,167 versus $18,636 for females. The per capita income for the city was $11,861. About 11.7% of families and 15.0% of the population were below the poverty line, including 13.9% of those under age 18 and 28.9% of those age 65 or over.

== Education ==
It is in the Parma School District 137.

Residents of Canyon County are in the area (and the taxation zone) for College of Western Idaho.

== Notable people ==
- Edgar Rice Burroughs, creator of Tarzan and John Carter of Mars. Served as a city councilman for Parma.
- Jimmy Johnston, American football player, born in Parma
- Jerry Kramer, American football player; elected to the Pro Football Hall of Fame in 2018
- Jordan Kramer, American football player, born in Parma.
- C. Ben Ross, first native-born governor of Idaho, served as governor from 1931 until 1937; born in Parma.

== See also ==
- List of cities in Idaho
