= Bowmont, Idaho =

Unincorporated community in the state of Idaho, United States

Coordinates: 43°27′22″N 116°32′27″W

Bowmont is a small rural farming community in Canyon County, in the southwestern part of the U.S. state of Idaho. The community is located north of Melba and south of Nampa.

== History ==
Bowmont's population was 25 in 1960.
