= Caldwell Executive Airport =

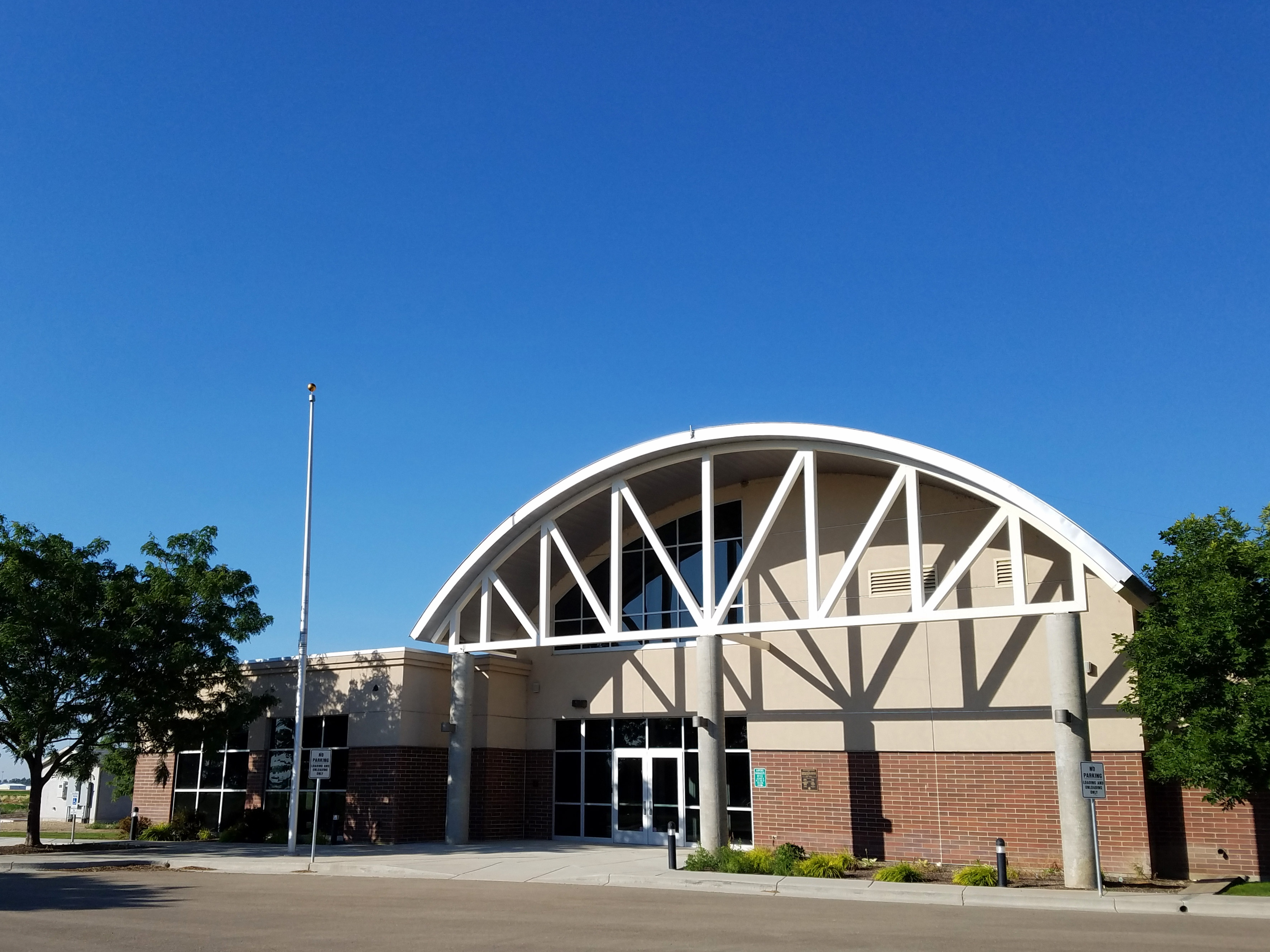
- Caldwell Executive Airport terminal building
- IATA: none; ICAO: KEUL; FAA LID: EUL

Summary
- Airport type: Public
- Owner: City of Caldwell
- Location: Caldwell, Idaho
- Elevation AMSL: 2,431 ft (741 m)
- Coordinates: 43°38′31″N 116°38′09″W
- Website: www.cityofcaldwell.org/departments/airport

Map
- Interactive map of Caldwell Executive Airport

Runways
Direction	Length		Surface
Direction	ft	m	Surface
12/30	5,500	1,676	Asphalt

Statistics (2024)
- Aircraft operations (year ending 3/30/2024): 147,325
- Based aircraft: 533
- Source: Federal Aviation Administration

Caldwell Executive Airport (formerly Treasure Valley Executive Airport at Caldwell) (ICAO: KEUL, FAA LID: EUL) is a city-owned public airport three miles (5 km) southeast of Caldwell, in Canyon County, Idaho, United States. The airport opened in 1976, replacing a smaller facility in downtown Caldwell.

Most U.S. airports use the same three-letter location identifier for the FAA and IATA, but Caldwell Executive Airport is assigned EUL by the FAA and has no IATA code.

== History ==
The Caldwell Industrial Airport was established on 460 acres (190 ha) in 1971, a contract for the construction awarded in 1975 and the facility opened in 1976.

The airport was renamed Treasure Valley Executive Airport at the start of 2022. The same year, it began soliciting bids for a new fixed-base operator to replace the airport restaurant. The following year, the Caldwell Executive Airport Advisory Board was created. A 12,000-square-foot (1,100 m^{2}) combination hangar and event venue was under construction in January 2026.

== Facilities and aircraft ==
Caldwell Executive Airport covers 154 acres (62 ha) and has one asphalt runway (12/30), 5,500 x 100 ft (1,676 x 30 m).

In the year ending March 30, 2024 the airport had 147,325 aircraft operations, average 403 per day: 99% general aviation, 1% air taxi and <1% military. 533 aircraft were then based at this airport: 473 single-engine, 25 multi-engine, 1 ultralight, 2 glider, 26 helicopter and 6 jet. Although the airport does not serve commercial airline passengers, its runway is Idaho's busiest site for takeoffs and landings.

An aircraft restoration company called Vintage Airframes is located at the airport.

== Airlines and destinations ==
There are no commercial airlines at this time.

== Accidents and incidents ==
On June 27, 2019, at 6:45 a.m., a Stinson plane, returning from a practice flight, lost engine power, and crashed into the south fence while attempting to land. The pilot was uninjured.

On August 26, 2022, around 4 p.m., a single engine aircraft crashed after losing power on take-off while attempting to circle back to the airport.

== See also ==
- List of airports in Idaho
