= Roswell, Idaho =

Unincorporated community in the state of Idaho, United States

- Unincorporated community
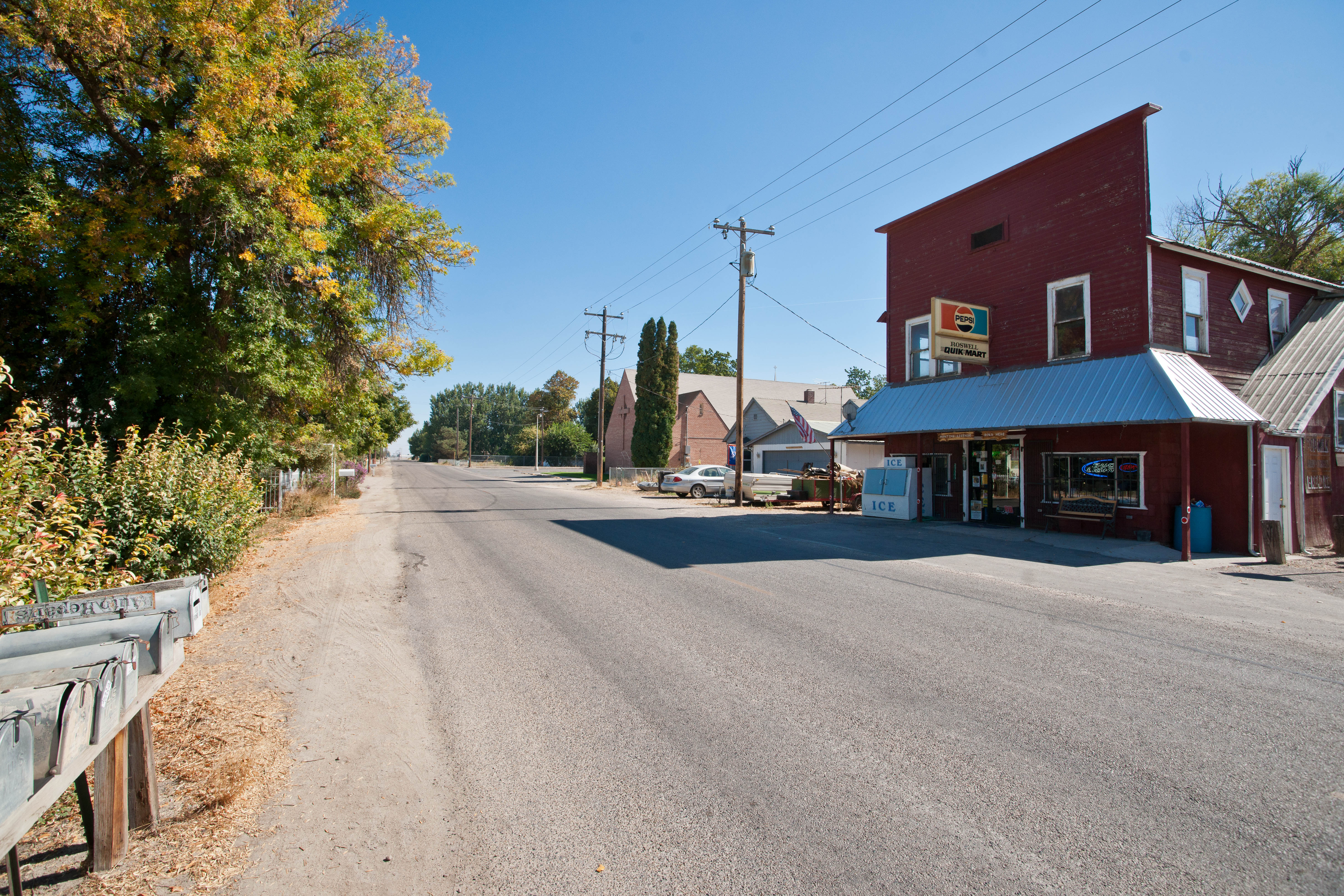
- State Highway 18 through Roswell

- Location within the state of Idaho Roswell, Idaho (the United States)
- Coordinates: 43°44′57″N 116°57′43″W
- Country: United States
- State: Idaho
- County: Canyon
- Elevation: 2,264 ft (690 m)
- Time zone: UTC-7 (Mountain (MST))
  - Summer (DST): UTC-6 (MDT)
- ZIP codes: 83660
- Area codes: 208, 986
- GNIS feature ID: 400062

Roswell is an unincorporated community in Canyon County in the U.S. state of Idaho.

Roswell is located 2 mi (3.2 km) south of Parma. Founded in 1889, it was named by and for an early settler and school teacher who dreamed of founding a town in that spot.

Roswell Grade School was added to the National Register of Historic Places in 1982.

== Gallery ==
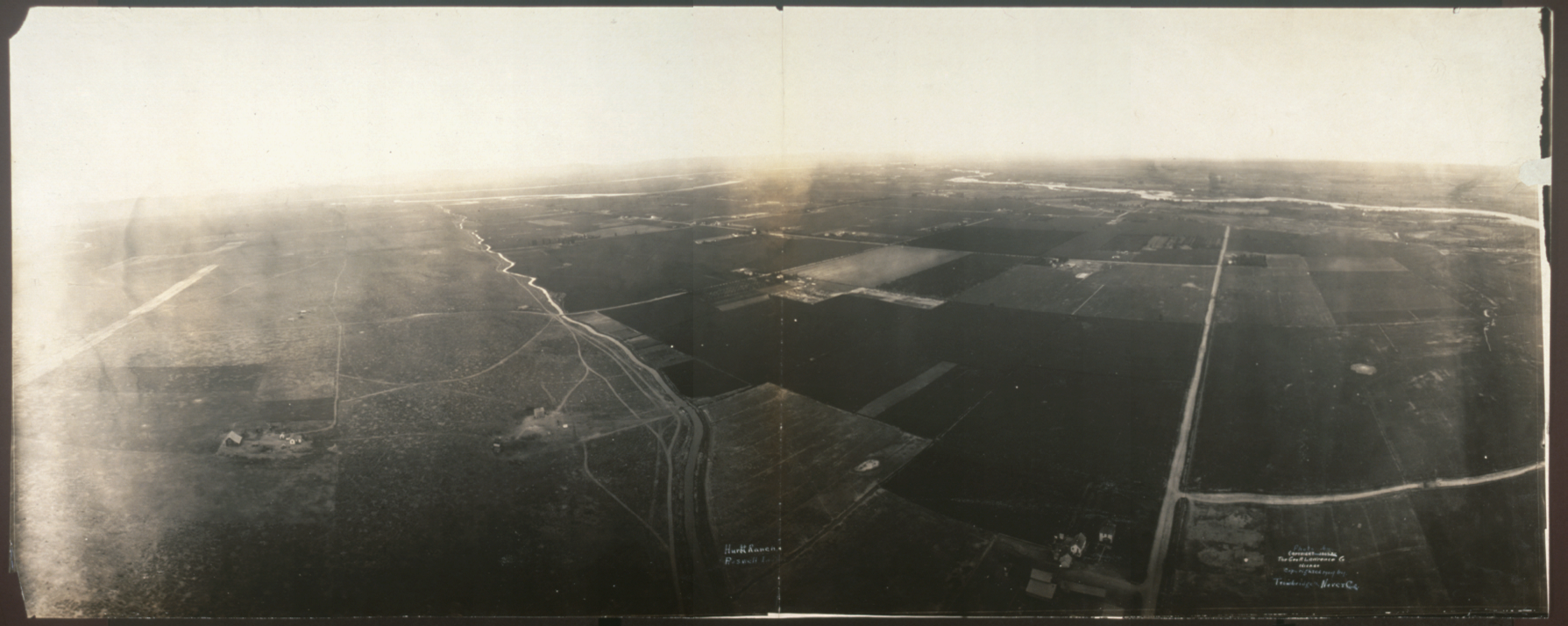
Hurtt Ranch in 1909

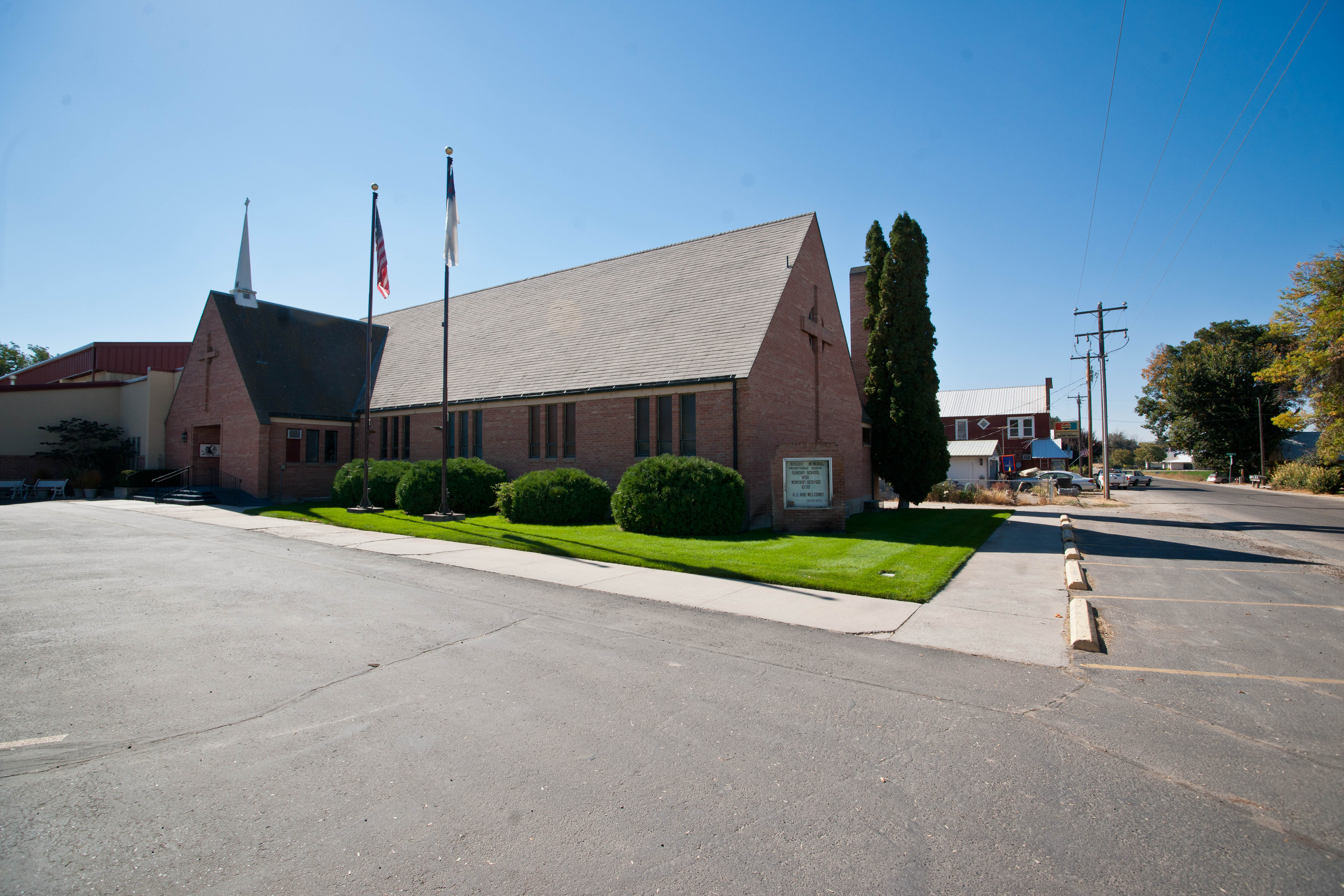
Sterry Memorial Presbyterian Church

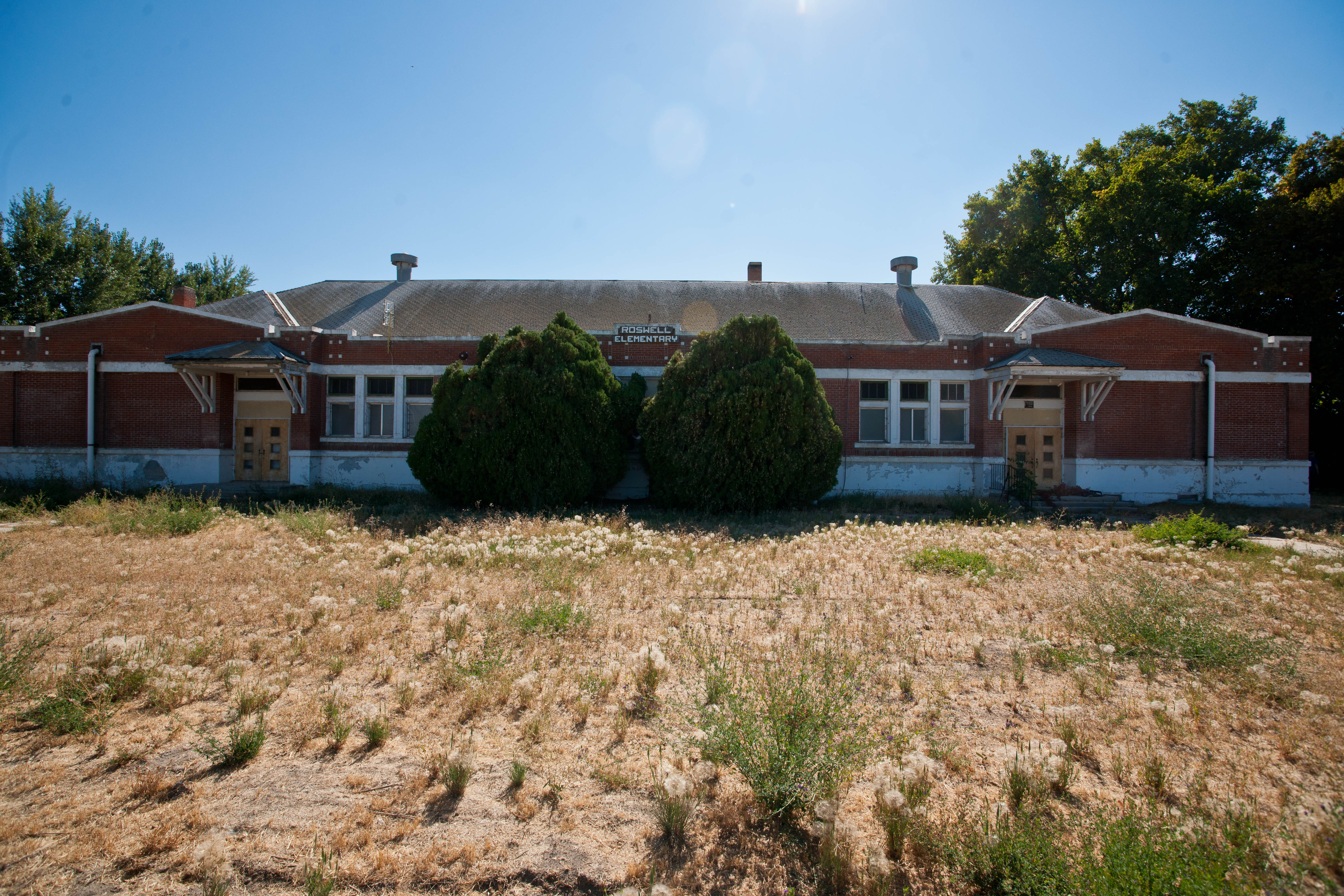
Roswell Grade School
