= Dennis Griffin =

American academic administrator

Dennis Griffin is an American academic administrator, who served as interim president of the College of Western Idaho. Prior to coming to the College of Western Idaho, Griffin had worked for fifteen years at Boise State University.

Preceded by (none)	President of College of Western Idaho; 2007–present	Incumbent
