= Caldwell, Idaho =

- City
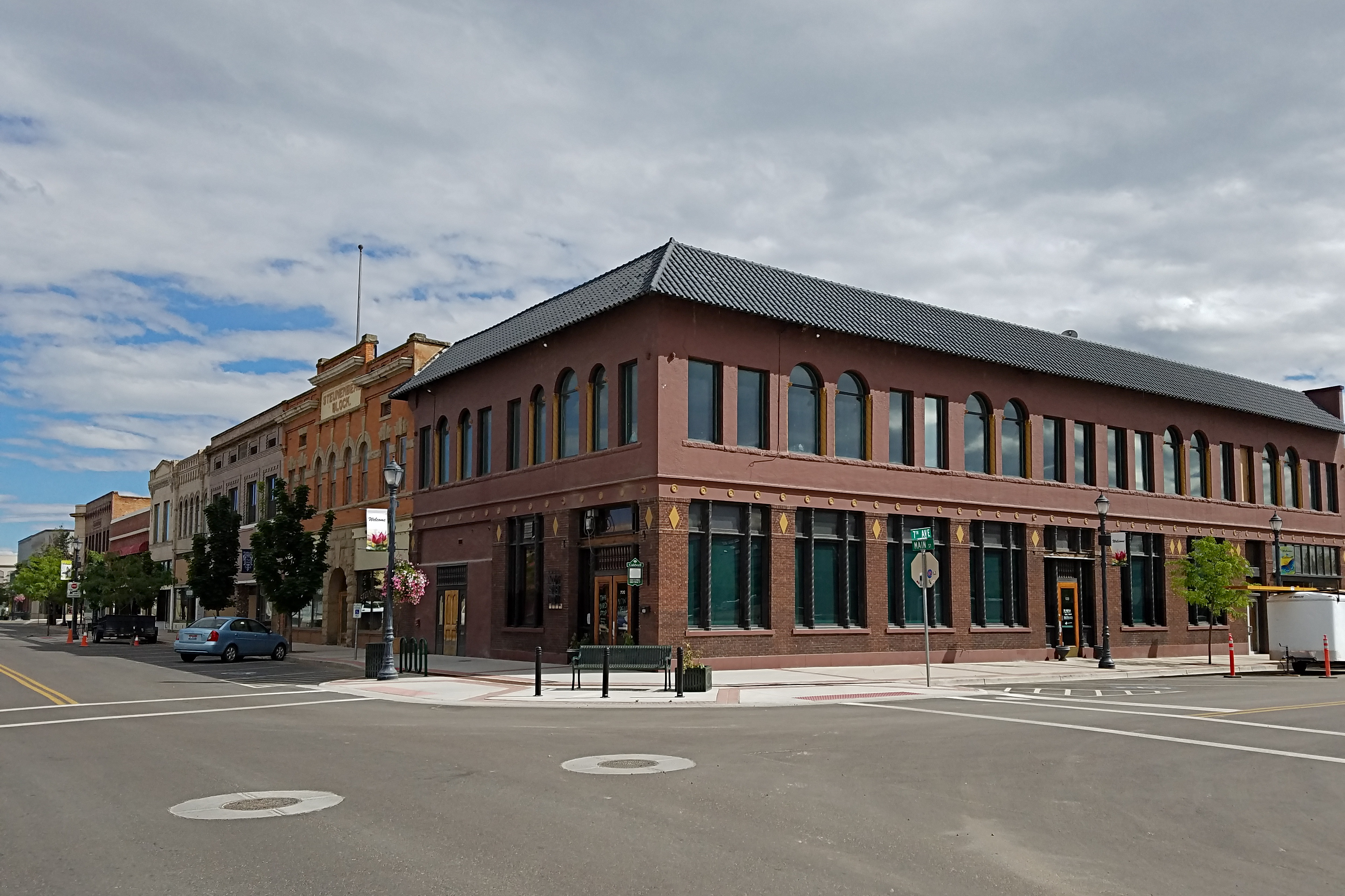
- Downtown Caldwell
- Nickname: The Treasure of the Valley
- Motto: More to Offer
- Location of Caldwell in Canyon County, Idaho

- Location in the United States
- Coordinates: 43°38′40″N 116°38′49″W
- Country: United States
- State: Idaho
- County: Canyon
- Established: 1883

Government
  - Mayor: Eric Phillips

Area
  - Total: 22.67 sq mi (58.71 km^{2})
  - Land: 22.61 sq mi (58.57 km^{2})
  - Water: 0.054 sq mi (0.14 km^{2})
- Elevation: 2,395 ft (730 m)

Population (2020)
  - Total: 59,996
  - Density: 2,586.0/sq mi (998.47/km^{2})
- Time zone: UTC−7 (Mountain)
  - Summer (DST): UTC−6 (Mountain)
- ZIP codes: 83605-83607
- Area codes: 208, 986
- FIPS code: 16-12250
- GNIS feature ID: 2409956
- Website: www.cityofcaldwell.org

Caldwell (locally CALL-dwel) is a city in and the county seat of Canyon County, Idaho, United States. Caldwell is the 5th most populous city in Idaho. As of the 2020 census, Caldwell had a population of 59,996.

Caldwell is considered part of the Boise metropolitan area, and is the location of the College of Idaho. The city is located approximately 24 miles (39 km) west of Boise, and approximately 17 miles (27 km) east of the Oregon border.

== History ==
The present-day location of Caldwell is along a natural passageway to the Inland and Pacific Northwest. Native American tribes from the west coast, north Idaho and as far away as Colorado came to the banks of the Boise River for annual trading fairs, or rendezvous. European and some Hawaiian explorers and traders soon followed the paths left by Native Americans and hopeful emigrants later forged the Oregon Trail and followed those paths to seek a better life in the Oregon Territory. Pioneers of the Trail traveled along the Boise River to Canyon Hill and forded the river close to the Silver Bridge on Plymouth Street.

During the Civil War, the discovery of gold in Idaho's mountains brought a variety of new settlers into the area. Many never made it to the mines but settled along the Boise River and run ferries, stage stations, and freighting businesses. These early entrepreneurs created small ranches and farms in the river valleys. Caldwell's inception occurred largely as a result of the construction of the Oregon Short Line Railroad, which connected Wyoming to Oregon through Idaho. Robert E. Strahorn came to the Boise River Valley in 1883 to select a route for the railroad. He rejected the grade into Boise City as too steep and chose a site 30 miles to the west. He drove a stake into an alkali flat of sagebrush and greasewood and the City of Caldwell was platted. Caldwell was named after one of Strahorn's business partners, Alexander Caldwell, a former senator from Kansas.

When Caldwell was platted in August 1883, its founder, the Idaho and Oregon Land Improvement Company, started persuading settlers and businessmen to move to the area. Within four months, Caldwell had 600 residents living in 150 dwellings, 40 businesses, a school, a telephone exchange, and two newspapers. On January 15, 1890, the Board of Commissioners of Ada County issued a handwritten order incorporating the City of Caldwell. The College of Idaho was founded in Caldwell in 1891. In 1892, Canyon County was established from a portion of Ada County, and Caldwell was named the county seat. Irrigation canals and waterways were constructed throughout Canyon County, providing the foundation for an agricultural economy. The Oregon Short Line Railroad became part of the larger Union Pacific Railroad network and in 1906 the Caldwell freight and passenger depot was constructed. Caldwell experienced moderate growth as an agricultural processing, commercial retail and educational center during the 20th century.

In 2009, the City of Caldwell completed a revitalization project to restore Indian Creek, which runs through downtown Caldwell, but had been used for sewage disposal by local industries and been covered over. The restored creek includes suspended bridges, walkways and picnic tables.

== Geography ==
According to the United States Census Bureau, the city has an area of 22.11 square miles (57.26 km^{2}), of which 22.06 square miles (57.14 km^{2}) is land and 0.05 square miles (0.13 km^{2}) is water.

=== Climate ===
Caldwell experiences a semi-arid climate (Köppen BSk) with cold and moderately wet winters and hot, dry summers.

Climate data for Caldwell, Idaho (1981-2010 normals)
Month	Jan	Feb	Mar	Apr	May	Jun	Jul	Aug	Sep	Oct	Nov	Dec	Year
Record high °F (°C)	66 (19)	70 (21)	84 (29)	94 (34)	102 (39)	106 (41)	110 (43)	112 (44)	104 (40)	94 (34)	79 (26)	69 (21)	112 (44)
Mean daily maximum °F (°C)	38.8 (3.8)	46.8 (8.2)	56.8 (13.8)	66.5 (19.2)	75.7 (24.3)	84.6 (29.2)	92.9 (33.8)	93.7 (34.3)	82.0 (27.8)	67.4 (19.7)	50.2 (10.1)	38.5 (3.6)	66.3 (19.1)
Daily mean °F (°C)	30.8 (−0.7)	36.5 (2.5)	45.7 (7.6)	52.2 (11.2)	61.0 (16.1)	68.8 (20.4)	76.8 (24.9)	74.9 (23.8)	64.4 (18.0)	52.3 (11.3)	39.7 (4.3)	30.4 (−0.9)	52.8 (11.6)
Mean daily minimum °F (°C)	22.9 (−5.1)	26.2 (−3.2)	32.9 (0.5)	38.0 (3.3)	46.2 (7.9)	53.1 (11.7)	59.9 (15.5)	57.0 (13.9)	46.8 (8.2)	37.3 (2.9)	29.3 (−1.5)	22.3 (−5.4)	39.3 (4.1)
Record low °F (°C)	−31 (−35)	−21 (−29)	−6 (−21)	12 (−11)	22 (−6)	29 (−2)	37 (3)	31 (−1)	23 (−5)	15 (−9)	−4 (−20)	−34 (−37)	−34 (−37)
Average precipitation inches (mm)	1.41 (36)	0.95 (24)	1.29 (33)	1.07 (27)	1.20 (30)	0.64 (16)	0.26 (6.6)	0.28 (7.1)	0.51 (13)	0.71 (18)	1.18 (30)	1.60 (41)	11.1 (281.7)
Average precipitation days (≥ 0.01 in)	9.2	8.4	10.1	8	6.5	4.4	2.6	2.5	3.1	4.8	11.1	10.4	81.1
Source 1: NOAA
Source 2: The Weather Channel (Records)

== Demographics ==
Historical population
Census	Pop.	Note	%±
1890	779		—
1900	997		28.0%
1910	3,543		255.4%
1920	5,106		44.1%
1930	4,974		−2.6%
1940	7,272		46.2%
1950	10,487		44.2%
1960	12,230		16.6%
1970	14,219		16.3%
1980	17,699		24.5%
1990	18,400		4.0%
2000	25,967		41.1%
2010	46,237		78.1%
2020	59,996		29.8%
U.S. Decennial Census

=== 2020 census ===
As of the 2020 census, Caldwell had a population of 59,996. The median age was 31.0 years. 30.4% of residents were under the age of 18, 9.2% were under age 5, and 11.9% were 65 years of age or older. For every 100 females there were 97.7 males, and for every 100 females age 18 and over there were 94.7 males age 18 and over.

99.6% of residents lived in urban areas, while 0.4% lived in rural areas.

There were 19,192 households in Caldwell, of which 43.1% had children under the age of 18 living in them. Of all households, 51.9% were married-couple households, 15.0% were households with a male householder and no spouse or partner present, and 24.3% were households with a female householder and no spouse or partner present. About 19.4% of all households were made up of individuals and 8.8% had someone living alone who was 65 years of age or older.

There were 19,884 housing units, of which 3.5% were vacant. The homeowner vacancy rate was 1.2% and the rental vacancy rate was 3.8%.

Racial composition as of the 2020 census
Race	Number	Percent
White	38,845	64.7%
Black or African American	537	0.9%
American Indian and Alaska Native	876	1.5%
Asian	554	0.9%
Native Hawaiian and Other Pacific Islander	140	0.2%
Some other race	9,954	16.6%
Two or more races	9,090	15.2%
Hispanic or Latino (of any race)	22,005	36.7%

=== 2010 census ===
As of the 2010 census, there were 46,237 people, 14,895 households and 10,776 families residing in the city. The population density was 2,096.0 inhabitants per square mile (809.3/km^{2}). There were 16,323 housing units at an average density of 739.9 per square mile (285.7/km^{2}). The racial makeup of the city was 77.5% White, 0.6% African American, 1.2% Native American, 0.9% Asian, 0.1% Pacific Islander, 16.1% from other races, and 3.6% from two or more races. Hispanic or Latino people of any race were 35.4% of the population.

There were 14,895 households, of which 46.5% had children under the age of 18 living with them, 50.5% were married couples living together, 15.5% had a female householder with no husband present, 6.4% had a male householder with no wife present, and 27.7% were non-families. 21.7% of all households were made up of individuals, and 8.5% had someone living alone who was 65 years of age or older. The average household size was 3.00 and the average family size was 3.51.

The median age in the city was 28.2 years. 33.1% of residents were under the age of 18; 11.5% were between the ages of 18 and 24; 28.4% were from 25 to 44; 18.2% were from 45 to 64; and 8.9% were 65 years of age or older. The gender makeup of the city was 49.4% male and 50.6% female.

The median household income was $37,336. The per capita income was $15,731. About 20.2% of the population was below the poverty line.

== Arts and culture ==
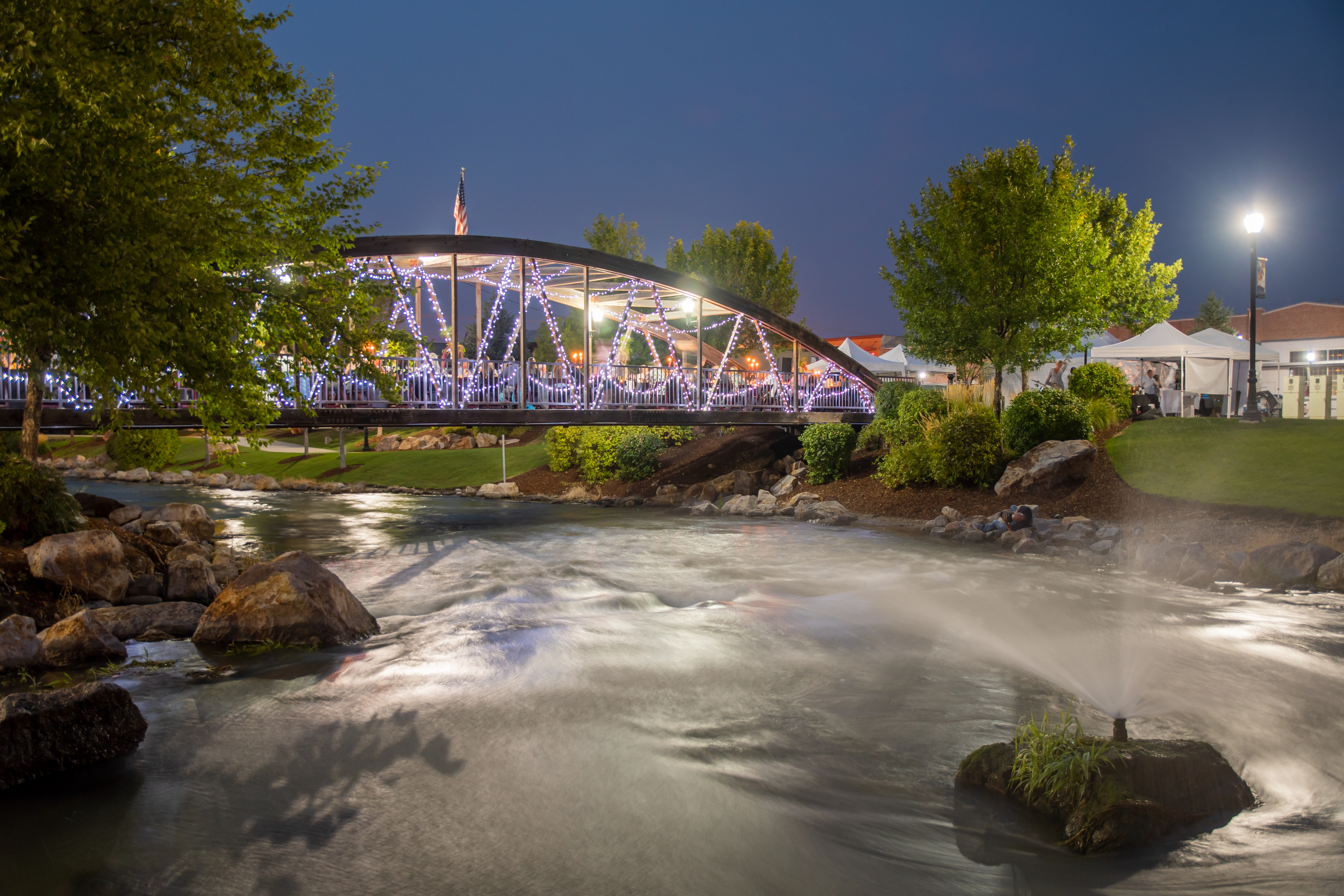
Restaurant on Indian Creek

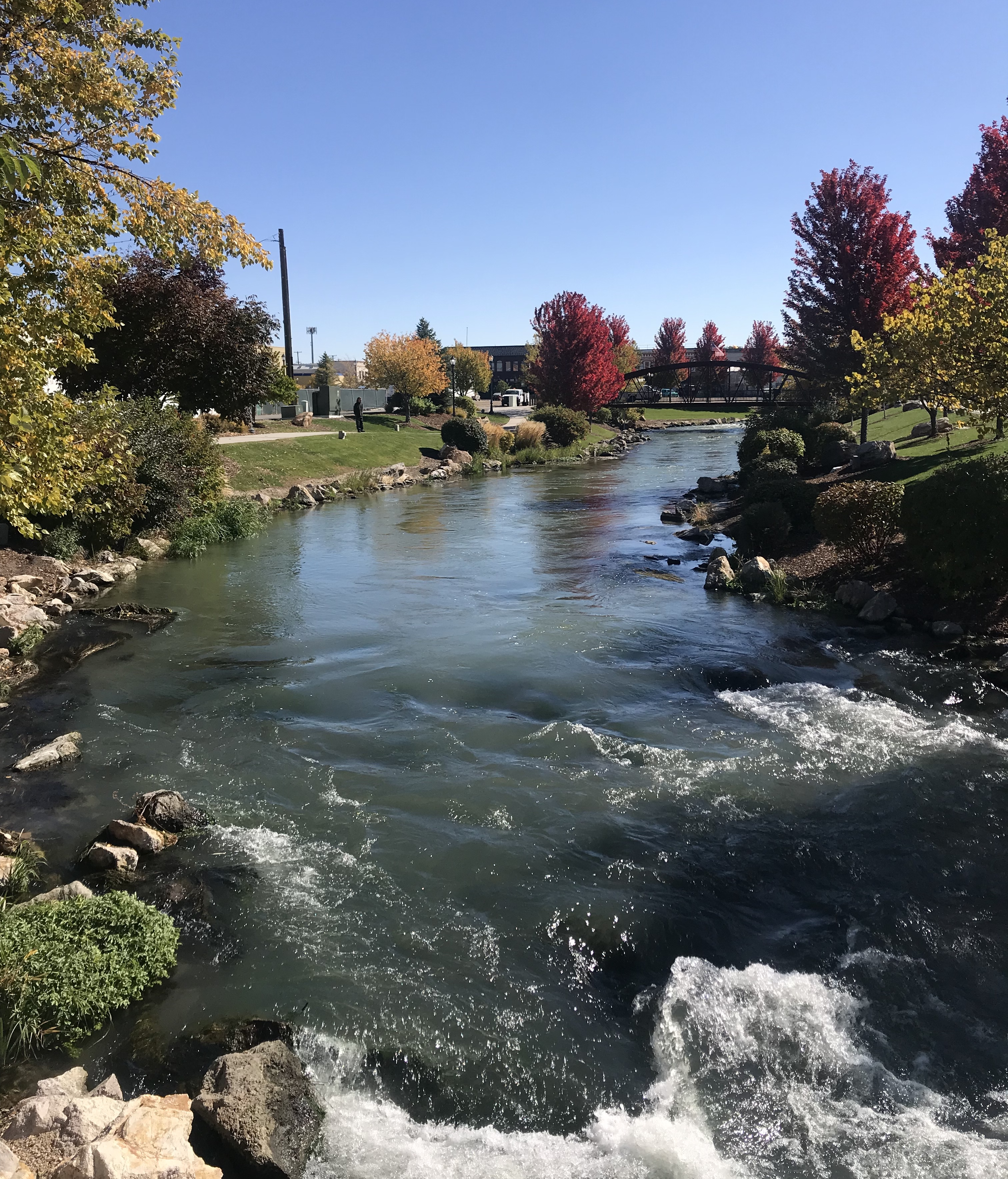
Indian Creek in downtown Caldwell

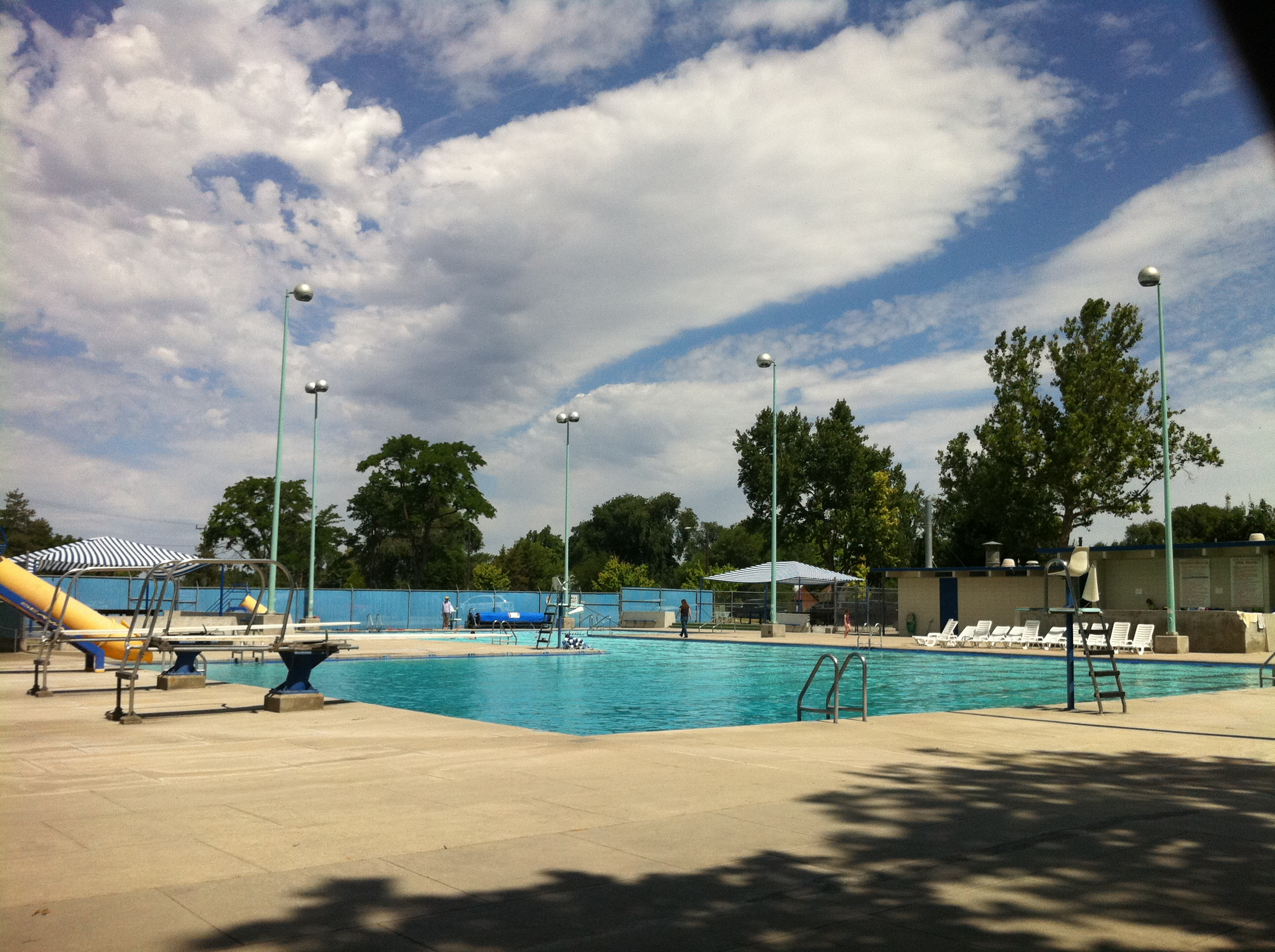
Public pool

Caldwell has held an Indian Creek Festival every September since 2003. The event includes a fun run and a tug of war. Indian Creek Plaza, in downtown Caldwell, includes an ice ribbon each winter, as well as many events during the year.

== Parks and recreation ==
Caldwell has 12 city parks, two golf courses (Purple Sage and Fairview), a city pool, and three skateparks.

== Education ==
Caldwell K-12 students are split between two school districts: Caldwell School District and Vallivue School District. The Caldwell district is the smallest school district geographically in the state, at just 22 square miles. The district is bordered on the west, south and east by the much larger Vallivue district, which also encompasses the northern parts of Nampa. Between the two districts, there are five middle schools and nine elementary schools.

=== High schools in Caldwell ===
- Caldwell High School
- Canyon Springs High School
- Thomas Jefferson Charter School
- Vallivue High School
- Vision Charter School

=== College ===
The College of Idaho, established in 1891, is on a 55-acre (22 ha) campus in Caldwell.

== Infrastructure ==
Caldwell Executive Airport is southeast of downtown.

== Notable people ==
- Joseph Albertson, founder of Albertson's grocery store chain
- Troy Beyer, actress; attended high school in Caldwell
- Ronee Blakley, actress and singer
- George Blankley, former BSU head basketball coach
- Daniel Carter, LDS composer
- Thomas C. Coffin, congressman
- Dame Darcy, cartoonist and performer
- Shirley Englehorn, LPGA golfer
- A. J. Feeley, NFL quarterback
- Mike Garman, Major League Baseball pitcher
- Lawrence H. Gipson, Pulitzer Prize winner
- Ron Hadley, NFL linebacker
- Maria Dahvana Headley, writer
- Sarah Hokom, professional disc golfer and 2012 PDGA World Champion
- Wayne Hooper, gospel music composer and singer
- Gary Hubler, champion of the Formula 1 class of the Reno Air Races
- David Kamo, motorcycle racer
- James Knight, former University of Washington football coach
- Mark Lindsay, musician
- Edward Lodge, U.S. District Court judge
- Larry Lujack, disc jockey
- Dean McAdams, NFL player
- Ray McDonald, NFL running back, graduated from Caldwell High School
- Jim McMillan, gridiron football player
- John T. Morrison, original faculty member of the College of Idaho; former Idaho governor
- Butch Otter, governor of Idaho and former congressman
- Cody Pickett, NFL quarterback
- Jay Pickett, actor
- Frank Reberger, Major League Baseball player and coach
- Paul Revere, musician
- Jim Rohn, entrepreneur, author and motivational speaker
- Frank Steunenberg, governor of Idaho
- Gary Stevens, jockey, won Kentucky Derby three times
- Steve Symms, former U.S. senator and congressman
- Renee Tenison, 1990 Playboy Playmate of the Year
- Rosie Tenison, actress and model
- Randy Trautman, Canadian football defensive lineman
- Gys van Beek, Dutch-American inventor and member of the Dutch resistance during World War II

== See also ==
- Bud, an early 20th-century dog from the Caldwell area
