= Boise River and Canal Bridge =

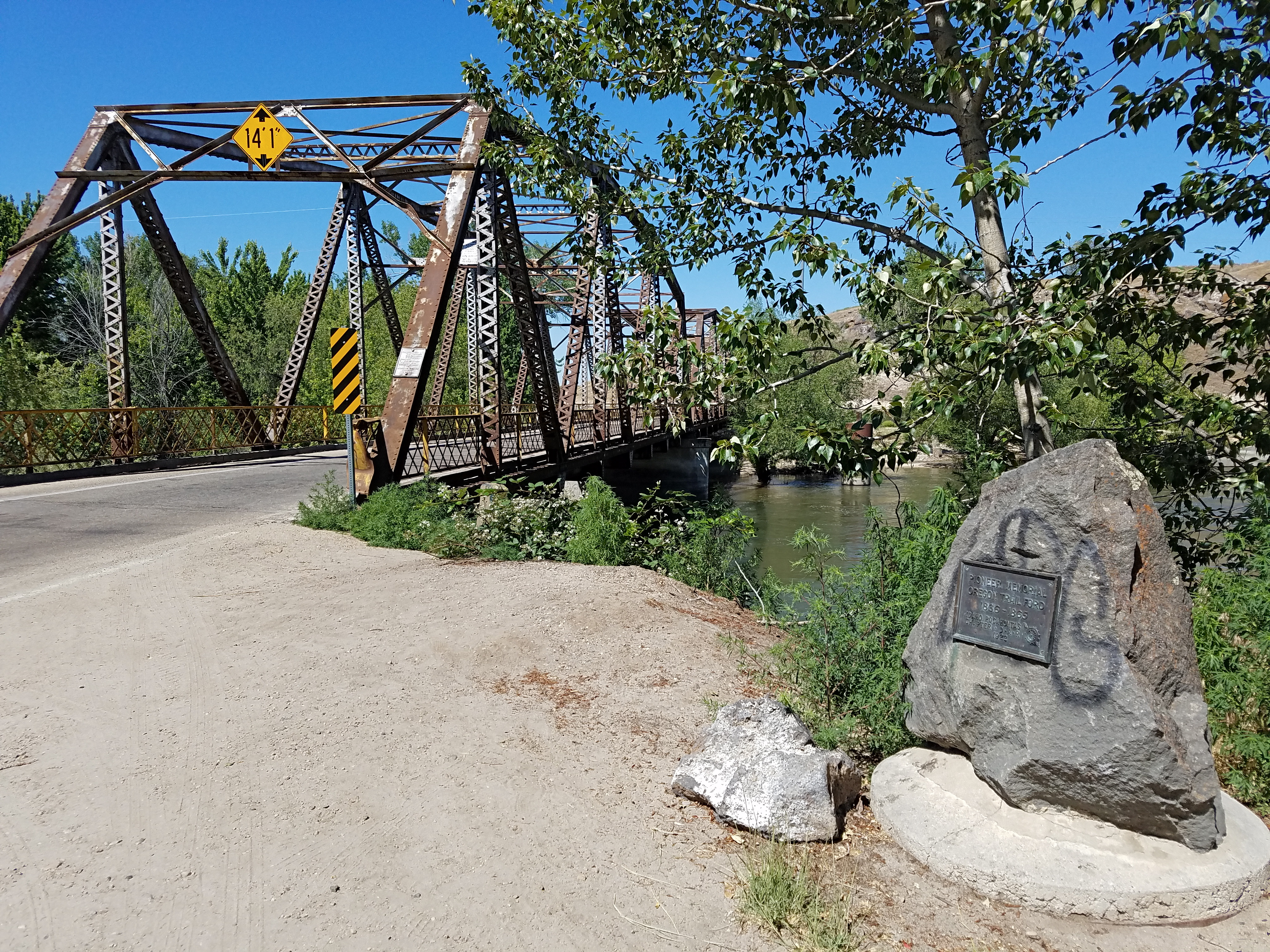
- Coordinates: 43°41′20″N 116°41′13″W
- Carries: One multi-direction lane of W. Plymouth St
- Crosses: Boise River, Caldwell, Idaho

Characteristics
- Design: Warren camelback through-truss

History
- Constructed by: American Bridge Company
- Opened: 1922; 104 years ago
- Boise River and Canal Bridge
- U.S. National Register of Historic Places
- NRHP reference No.: 07000003
- Added to NRHP: February 7, 2007; 19 years ago

Location
- Interactive map of Boise River and Canal Bridge

The Boise River and Canal Bridge, in Caldwell, Idaho, is a three-span, 390 ft (120 m) Warren camelback through-truss design constructed in 1922 by the American Bridge Company from plans submitted by Caldwell city engineer Fred H. McConnel. The site is where Oregon Trail pioneers forded the Boise River. The bridge was listed on the National Register of Historic Places in 2007.

The Boise River and Canal Bridge replaced an earlier bridge known as the Canyon Hill Bridge, and when the new bridge was commissioned by Canyon County officials, it continued under the same name. Later, the bridge became known as Idaho Pacific Highway Bridge, Highway 30 Bridge, or Silver Bridge.

The bridge road width, 19.5 ft (5.9 m), only allows for one automobile traffic lane, and vertical clearance is limited to 14.1 ft (4.3 m). These factors and that the bridge is beyond its functional lifespan have prompted Canyon County officials to consider refurbishing the Boise River and Canal Bridge as a pedestrian only bridge and building a new bridge for motorized traffic near the site.
