= Ola, Idaho =

Unincorporated community in the state of Idaho, United States

- Unincorporated community
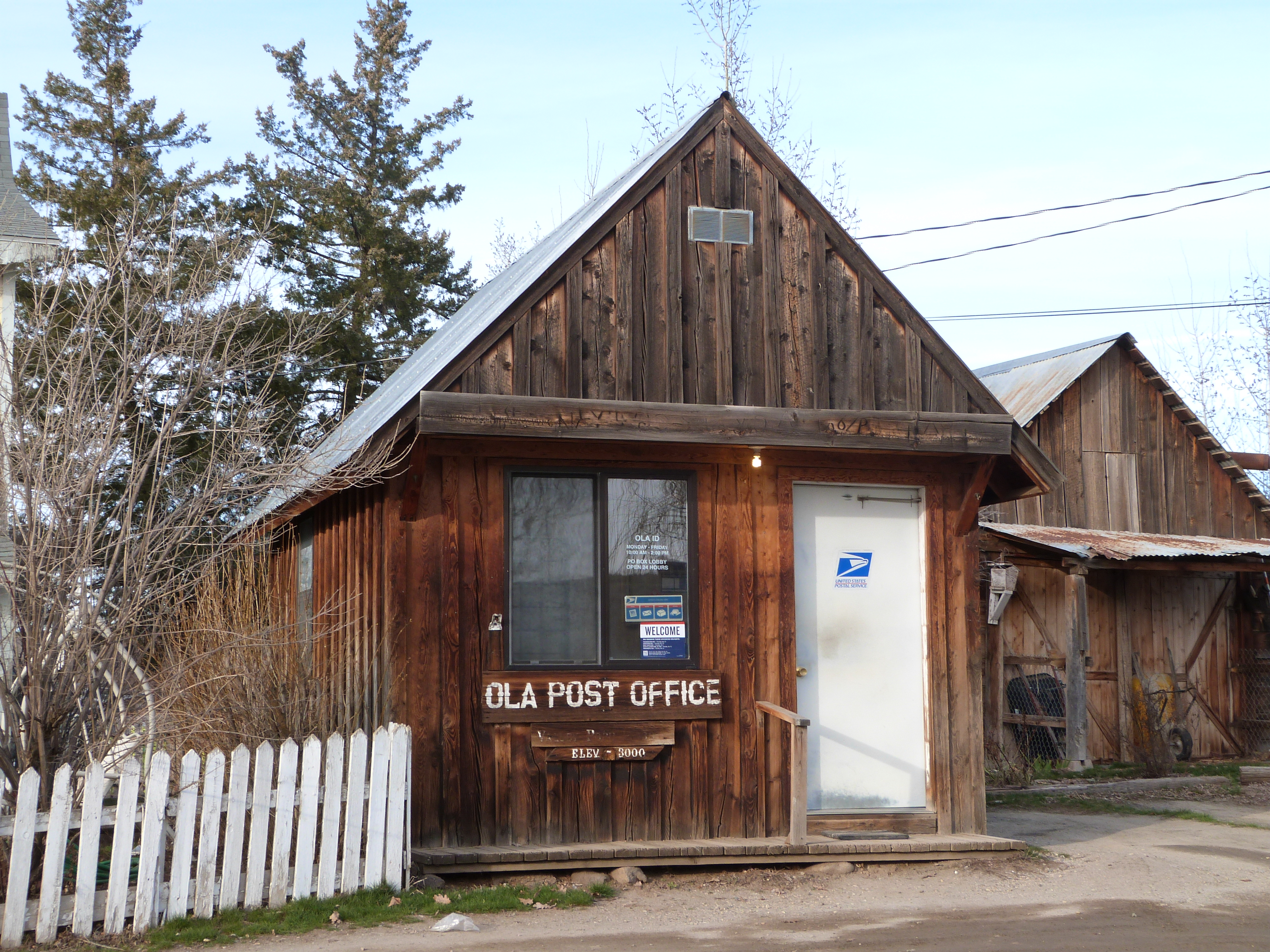
- Ola Post Office

- Location within the state of Idaho Ola, Idaho (the United States)
- Coordinates: 44°10′42″N 116°17′33″W
- Country: United States
- State: Idaho
- County: Gem
- Elevation: 3,008 ft (917 m)
- Time zone: UTC-7 (Mountain (MST))
  - Summer (DST): UTC-6 (MDT)
- ZIP codes: 83657
- Area codes: 208, 986
- GNIS feature ID: 393849

Ola is an unincorporated community in Gem County, Idaho, United States. It is located 23 mi (37 km) northeast of Emmett.

Ola was established as a post office July 22, 1882, by Carroll Baird. It serves the Upper Squaw Creek Valley.

== History ==
The first post office in this area was "Upper Squaw Creek", established in September 1875, by Carroll Baird. Baird homesteaded along Squaw Creek, less than half a mile west of the present-day site of Ola.

Nellie Ireton Mills writes that the Bairds built their cabin where the old Indian trail crosses the creek. The trail was also used by miners and others taking the short cut to, or from, Oregon and the Boise Basin. Prior to the 1875 post office, the mail was delivered by pack horse and snowshoes along the Brownlee Trail from Horseshoe Bend (Boise County) to Warren (Idaho County).

Six weeks after the post office was established, Bairds' bachelor neighbor to the north, Fred Hoffman, was appointed postmaster, a position he held until the post office closed the end of January 1877, when mail was sent to Cascade (Valley County). Mills writes that first wedding in the community was between Fred Hoffman (aka Huffman) and school teacher Ella Drake on March 6, 1879.

When the post office was re-established in July 1882, Baird chose the name of Ola, "for an old Swede that happened along." For a time, up until the late 1980s, the post office was housed inside the Ola General Store. While the store closed its doors at about 1987–1989, the Ola General Store has now re-opened its doors. A small one-room building was built on the property across the street of Ola School Road, on the "Matthew House" homesite, named for Ola blacksmith Archie Matthews. At that time the "Post Mistress" Elaine Waldner resided there, making it easy for her to work. The Matthew house was also the childhood home of boxer Harry "Kid" Matthews. Harry Matthews fought in the 1940s and 1950s. Among his most notable fights were a loss to Rocky Marciano, and a win over Ezzard Charles.

== Geography ==
=== Climate ===
This climatic region has large seasonal temperature differences, with warm to hot (and often humid) summers and cold (sometimes severely cold) winters. According to the Köppen Climate Classification system, Ola has a humid continental climate, abbreviated "Dfb" on climate maps.

Climate data for Ola, Idaho, 1991–2020 normals, extremes 1896–present
Month	Jan	Feb	Mar	Apr	May	Jun	Jul	Aug	Sep	Oct	Nov	Dec	Year
Record high °F (°C)	60 (16)	67 (19)	80 (27)	90 (32)	98 (37)	105 (41)	110 (43)	108 (42)	102 (39)	94 (34)	71 (22)	63 (17)	110 (43)
Mean maximum °F (°C)	47.7 (8.7)	55.1 (12.8)	68.7 (20.4)	78.0 (25.6)	88.3 (31.3)	96.2 (35.7)	102.9 (39.4)	100.6 (38.1)	94.3 (34.6)	82.9 (28.3)	62.9 (17.2)	50.7 (10.4)	103.2 (39.6)
Mean daily maximum °F (°C)	37.7 (3.2)	44.6 (7.0)	54.4 (12.4)	61.8 (16.6)	72.1 (22.3)	80.7 (27.1)	92.5 (33.6)	91.2 (32.9)	80.9 (27.2)	65.1 (18.4)	48.3 (9.1)	37.7 (3.2)	63.9 (17.7)
Daily mean °F (°C)	26.6 (−3.0)	31.9 (−0.1)	40.4 (4.7)	46.4 (8.0)	55.4 (13.0)	62.6 (17.0)	71.5 (21.9)	69.8 (21.0)	60.3 (15.7)	47.3 (8.5)	35.1 (1.7)	27.1 (−2.7)	47.9 (8.8)
Mean daily minimum °F (°C)	15.4 (−9.2)	19.2 (−7.1)	26.4 (−3.1)	31.0 (−0.6)	38.8 (3.8)	44.4 (6.9)	50.6 (10.3)	48.4 (9.1)	39.6 (4.2)	29.5 (−1.4)	21.9 (−5.6)	16.6 (−8.6)	31.8 (−0.1)
Mean minimum °F (°C)	−0.7 (−18.2)	5.4 (−14.8)	15.6 (−9.1)	21.4 (−5.9)	26.8 (−2.9)	32.9 (0.5)	40.6 (4.8)	38.1 (3.4)	28.9 (−1.7)	18.5 (−7.5)	8.2 (−13.2)	2.4 (−16.4)	−5.9 (−21.1)
Record low °F (°C)	−33 (−36)	−32 (−36)	−9 (−23)	11 (−12)	20 (−7)	25 (−4)	30 (−1)	31 (−1)	17 (−8)	7 (−14)	−20 (−29)	−31 (−35)	−33 (−36)
Average precipitation inches (mm)	3.44 (87)	2.26 (57)	2.34 (59)	2.00 (51)	2.18 (55)	1.24 (31)	0.41 (10)	0.34 (8.6)	0.54 (14)	1.63 (41)	2.26 (57)	3.89 (99)	22.53 (569.6)
Average precipitation days (≥ 0.01 in)	13.8	11.1	13.0	12.7	10.2	7.3	2.8	2.5	3.8	7.8	12.2	14.7	111.9
Source 1: NOAA
Source 2: National Weather Service
