= Canyon County, Idaho =

County in Idaho, United States

- County
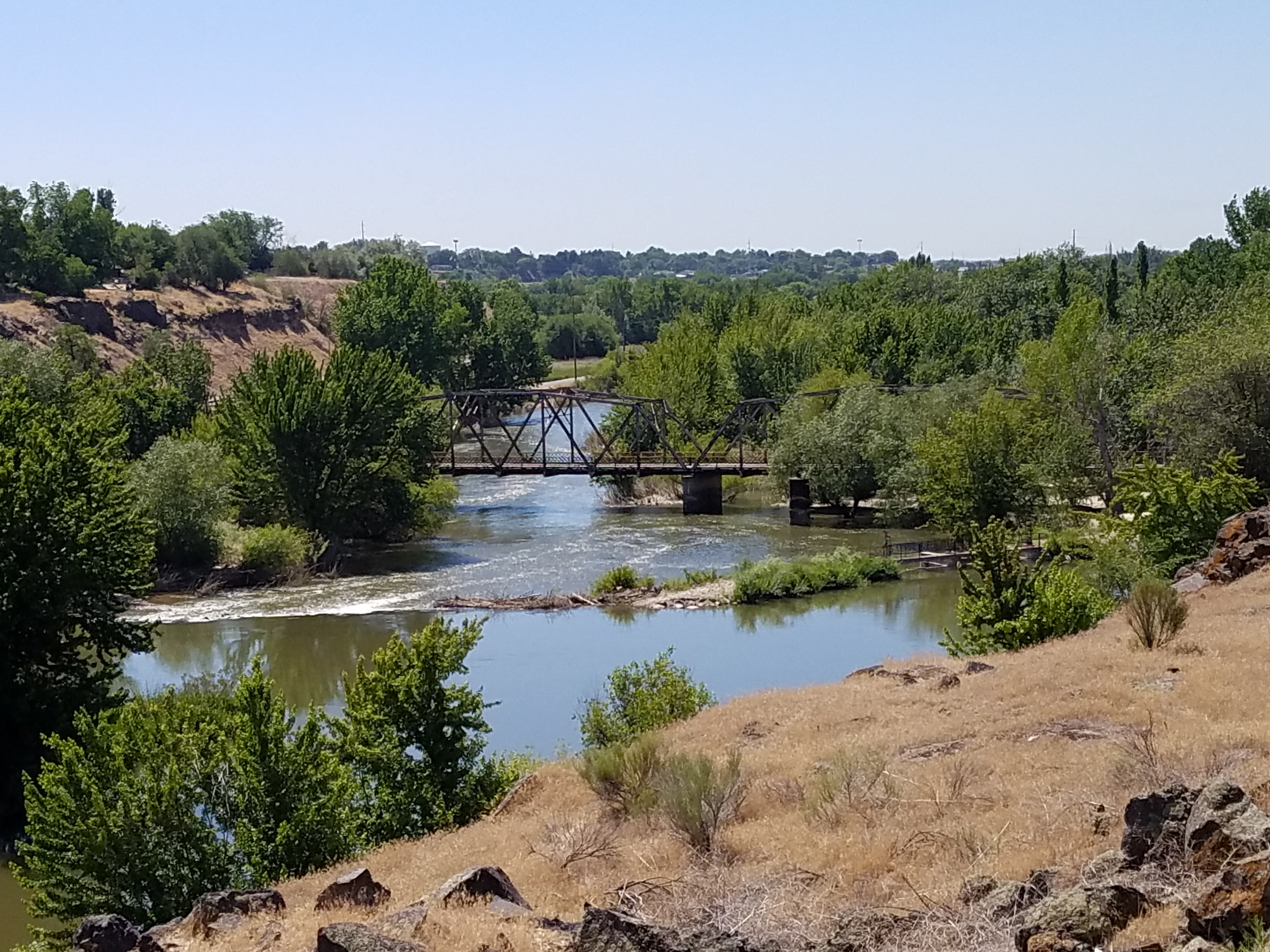
- Boise River and Canal Bridge in Caldwell

- Seal

- Location within the U.S. state of Idaho
- Coordinates: 43°38′N 116°43′W
- Country: United States
- State: Idaho
- Founded: March 7, 1891
- Seat: Caldwell
- Largest city: Nampa

Area
  - Total: 604 sq mi (1,560 km^{2})
  - Land: 587 sq mi (1,520 km^{2})
  - Water: 16 sq mi (41 km^{2}) 2.7%

Population (2020)
  - Total: 231,105
  - Estimate (2025): 275,123 ▲
  - Density: 394/sq mi (152/km^{2})
- Time zone: UTC−7 (Mountain)
  - Summer (DST): UTC−6 (MDT)
- Congressional district: 1st
- Website: www.canyoncounty.id.gov

Canyon County is located in the U.S. state of Idaho. As of the 2020 Census, the population was 231,105, which by 2025 was estimated to have risen to 275,123, making it the second-most populous county in Idaho. The county seat is Caldwell, and its largest city is Nampa. Canyon County is part of the Boise metropolitan area.

== History ==
Hudson's Bay Company established Fort Boise in 1834 near what is now Parma, but abandoned it in 1855. Emigrants traveled through Canyon County on the Oregon Trail.

Discovery of gold in the Boise Basin in 1862 brought settlement to the region again. The lower Boise River was fully contained within Boise County from 1863 until the formation of Ada County in 1864. Settlement of the lower Boise River west of Boise City was limited prior to the completion of the Oregon Short Line Railroad. Middleton was the first European settlement of Canyon County, starting in 1863. The 1870 Census for Ada County listed 76 residents of the Boise Valley, excluding Boise City and the 1880 Census listed 44 residents at Middleton. The arrival of the railroad at Caldwell led to the establishment of a town there as of August 1883.

Businessmen James A. McGee and Alexander Duffes filed the plat for nearby Nampa in 1886. Parma was settled around the same time, with the Old Fort Boise post office being moved to the town's location; it was incorporated in 1904. Ada County established precincts for each of the settlements with a combined 1890 Census population of 2,311. Significant settlement of Greenleaf and Notus started around 1904 with the two settlements listed as precincts at the 1910 census. Notus was incorporated in 1921 while Greenleaf was incorporated prior to 1980. Melba was incorporated in 1912 while Wilder was incorporated in 1919. The City of Star annexed a portion of territory in northeast Canyon County prior to 2007, becoming the county's ninth incorporated city. The majority of Star is located within Ada County.

The Idaho Legislature created Canyon County from Ada County in an act approved March 7, 1891, effective at the November 26, 1892, election. Caldwell was established as the county seat. The county originally contained all of Canyon and Payette counties and part of Gem; Gem County formed in 1915 and Payette County in 1917. Some sources attribute the name to the canyon of the Boise River near Caldwell, while western writers John Rees and Vardis Fisher believed it was named for the Snake River canyon, which forms a natural boundary with Owyhee County to the south and west.

== Geography ==
According to the United States Census Bureau, the county has a total area of 604 square miles (1,560 km^{2}), of which 587 sq mi (1,520 km^{2}) is land and 16 sq mi (41 km^{2}) (2.7%) is water.

=== Adjacent counties ===
- Payette County (north)
- Gem County (northeast)
- Ada County (east)
- Owyhee County (south)
- Malheur County, Oregon (west)

=== National protected areas ===
- Deer Flat National Wildlife Refuge (part)
- Snake River Birds of Prey National Conservation Area (part)

=== Major highways ===
- Interstate 84
- US 20
- US 26
- US 30
- US 95
- SH-19
- SH-44
- SH-45
- SH-55

== Demographics ==
Historical population
Census	Pop.	Note	%±
1900	7,497		—
1910	25,323		237.8%
1920	26,932		6.4%
1930	30,930		14.8%
1940	40,987		32.5%
1950	53,597		30.8%
1960	57,662		7.6%
1970	61,288		6.3%
1980	83,756		36.7%
1990	90,076		7.5%
2000	131,441		45.9%
2010	188,923		43.7%
2020	231,105		22.3%
2025 (est.)	275,123	▲	19.0%
U.S. Decennial Census; 1790–1960 1900–1990; 1990–2000 2010–2020

=== Racial and ethnic composition ===
Canyon County, Idaho – Racial and ethnic composition Note: the US Census treats Hispanic/Latino as an ethnic category. This table excludes Latinos from the racial categories and assigns them to a separate category. Hispanics/Latinos may be of any race.
Race / Ethnicity (NH = Non-Hispanic)	Pop 1980	Pop 1990	Pop 2000	Pop 2010	Pop 2020	% 1980	% 1990	% 2000	% 2010	% 2020
White alone (NH)	73,994	76,470	102,428	136,553	155,401	88.34%	84.89%	77.93%	72.28%	67.24%
Black or African American alone (NH)	138	165	337	877	1,455	0.16%	0.18%	0.26%	0.46%	0.63%
Native American or Alaska Native alone (NH)	466	595	838	1,229	1,176	0.56%	0.66%	0.64%	0.65%	0.51%
Asian alone (NH)	764	930	1,012	1,402	1,973	0.91%	1.03%	0.77%	0.74%	0.85%
Native Hawaiian or Pacific Islander alone (NH)	x	x	163	369	620	x	x	0.12%	0.20%	0.27%
Other race alone (NH)	259	78	150	212	1,120	0.31%	0.09%	0.11%	0.11%	0.48%
Mixed race or Multiracial (NH)	x	x	2,058	3,212	10,194	x	x	1.57%	1.70%	4.41%
Hispanic or Latino (any race)	8,135	11,838	24,455	45,069	59,166	9.71%	13.14%	18.61%	23.86%	25.60%
Total	83,756	90,076	131,441	188,923	231,105	100.00%	100.00%	100.00%	100.00%	100.00%

=== 2020 census ===
As of the 2020 census, the county had a population of 231,105. The median age was 34.5 years. 28.0% of residents were under the age of 18 and 14.8% of residents were 65 years of age or older. For every 100 females there were 98.3 males, and for every 100 females age 18 and over there were 95.9 males age 18 and over.

The racial makeup of the county was 73.3% White, 0.7% Black or African American, 1.2% American Indian and Alaska Native, 0.9% Asian, 0.3% Native Hawaiian and Pacific Islander, 11.4% from some other race, and 12.2% from two or more races. Hispanic or Latino residents of any race comprised 25.6% of the population.

81.3% of residents lived in urban areas, while 18.7% lived in rural areas.

There were 77,829 households in the county, of which 38.4% had children under the age of 18 living with them and 21.6% had a female householder with no spouse or partner present. About 19.3% of all households were made up of individuals and 9.0% had someone living alone who was 65 years of age or older.

There were 81,013 housing units, of which 3.9% were vacant. Among occupied housing units, 73.2% were owner-occupied and 26.8% were renter-occupied. The homeowner vacancy rate was 1.1% and the rental vacancy rate was 4.3%.

=== 2010 census ===
As of the 2010 census, there were 188,923 people, 63,604 households, and 47,481 families living in the county. The population density was 321.6 inhabitants per square mile (124.2/km^{2}). There were 69,409 housing units at an average density of 118.2 per square mile (45.6/km^{2}). The racial makeup of the county was 83.0% white, 1.1% American Indian, 0.8% Asian, 0.6% black or African American, 0.2% Pacific islander, 11.4% from other races, and 3.0% from two or more races. Those of Hispanic or Latino origin made up 23.9% of the population. In terms of ancestry, 18.8% were American, 17.4% were German, 13.0% were English, and 8.8% were Irish.

Of the 63,604 households, 42.7% had children under the age of 18 living with them, 56.7% were married couples living together, 12.3% had a female householder with no husband present, 25.3% were non-families, and 20.1% of all households were made up of individuals. The average household size was 2.92 and the average family size was 3.36. The median age was 31.6 years.

The median income for a household in the county was $43,218 and the median income for a family was $48,219. Males had a median income of $38,132 versus $28,356 for females. The per capita income for the county was $18,366. About 12.7% of families and 17.3% of the population were below the poverty line, including 23.8% of those under age 18 and 8.5% of those age 65 or over.

=== 2000 census ===
As of the 2000 census, there were 131,441 people, 45,018 households and 33,943 families living in the county. The population density was 223 people per square mile (86 people/km^{2}). There were 47,965 housing units at an average density of 81 units per square mile (31 units/km^{2}). The racial makeup of the county was 83.10% White, 0.32% Black or African American, 0.85% Native American, 0.80% Asian, 0.13% Pacific Islander, 12.17% from other races, and 2.62% from two or more races. Hispanic or Latino of any race were 18.61% of the population. 15.9% were of German, 12.7% English, 10.3% American and 7.6% Irish ancestry.

There were 45,018 households, of which 39.80% had children under the age of 18 living with them, 60.70% were married couples living together, 10.10% had a female householder with no husband present, and 24.60% were non-families. 19.80% of all households were made up of individuals, and 8.40% had someone living alone who was 65 years of age or older. The average household size was 2.85 and the average family size was 3.28.

30.90% of the population were under the age of 18, 10.70% from 18 to 24, 28.30% from 25 to 44, 19.10% from 45 to 64, and 11.00% who were 65 years of age or older. The median age was 30 years. For every 100 females, there were 98.70 males. For every 100 females age 18 and over, there were 96.30 males.

The median household income was $35,884 and the median family income was $40,377. Males had a median income of $29,418 compared with $22,044 for females. The per capita income for the county was $15,155. About 8.70% of families and 12.00% of the population were below the poverty line, including 14.50% of those under age 18 and 10.70% of those age 65 or over.

== Communities ==
=== Cities ===
- Caldwell
- Greenleaf
- Melba
- Middleton
- Nampa
- Notus
- Parma
- Star (partially)
- Wilder

=== Unincorporated communities ===
- Bowmont
- Huston
- Roswell
- Sunnyslope
- Walters Ferry, Idaho

== Politics ==
Like the majority of Idaho, Canyon County is reliably Republican by comfortable margins. The last time a Democratic candidate carried the county was in 1936 by Franklin D. Roosevelt. In elections, Republican candidates usually achieve approximately two-thirds of the vote from Canyon County.

United States presidential election results for Canyon County, Idaho
Year	Republican		Democratic		Third party(ies)	
Year	No.	%	No.	%	No.	%
1896	303	20.16%	1,178	78.38%	22	1.46%
1900	1,350	50.68%	1,314	49.32%	0	0.00%
1904	3,172	66.57%	1,025	21.51%	568	11.92%
1908	4,023	54.28%	2,783	37.55%	605	8.16%
1912	1,842	22.25%	2,432	29.38%	4,005	48.38%
1916	3,570	39.84%	4,478	49.98%	912	10.18%
1920	5,633	62.53%	3,375	37.47%	0	0.00%
1924	3,820	38.40%	965	9.70%	5,163	51.90%
1928	7,293	75.82%	2,187	22.74%	139	1.45%
1932	5,065	38.80%	6,940	53.16%	1,049	8.04%
1936	4,910	33.75%	8,290	56.99%	1,347	9.26%
1940	8,776	50.21%	8,639	49.43%	63	0.36%
1944	9,215	54.98%	7,306	43.59%	241	1.44%
1948	9,700	52.82%	7,903	43.04%	760	4.14%
1952	17,065	71.33%	6,810	28.47%	48	0.20%
1956	15,483	67.25%	7,540	32.75%	0	0.00%
1960	15,865	62.10%	9,681	37.90%	0	0.00%
1964	13,466	55.95%	10,601	44.05%	0	0.00%
1968	14,995	62.75%	5,717	23.92%	3,186	13.33%
1972	18,383	68.45%	5,630	20.96%	2,844	10.59%
1976	17,263	62.91%	9,460	34.47%	718	2.62%
1980	24,375	67.68%	9,172	25.47%	2,469	6.86%
1984	24,613	75.53%	7,527	23.10%	447	1.37%
1988	21,426	66.14%	10,207	31.51%	763	2.36%
1992	19,220	50.78%	9,095	24.03%	9,534	25.19%
1996	23,988	59.48%	11,800	29.26%	4,540	11.26%
2000	30,560	71.07%	10,588	24.62%	1,852	4.31%
2004	41,599	74.69%	13,415	24.09%	684	1.23%
2008	42,752	66.07%	20,147	31.14%	1,807	2.79%
2012	44,369	66.47%	19,866	29.76%	2,512	3.76%
2016	47,222	64.88%	16,883	23.20%	8,680	11.93%
2020	61,759	68.27%	25,881	28.61%	2,817	3.11%
2024	72,755	72.01%	25,669	25.41%	2,606	2.58%

== Education ==
School districts include:

- Caldwell School District 132
- Homedale Joint School District 370
- Kuna Joint School District 3
- Marsing Joint School District 363
- Melba Joint School District 136
- Middleton School District 134
- Nampa School District
- Notus School District 135
- Parma School District 137
- Vallivue School District
- West Ada School District (Meridian Joint School District 2)
- Wilder School District 133

Residents are in the area (and the taxation zone) for College of Western Idaho.

== Healthcare ==
The county is served by the Southwest Idaho Health District.

== See also ==
- National Register of Historic Places listings in Canyon County, Idaho
