= Sunnyslope, Idaho =

Unincorporated community in the state of Idaho, United States

- Unincorporated community
- Location within the state of Idaho Sunnyslope, Idaho (the United States)
- Coordinates: 43°35′19″N 116°47′36″W
- Country: United States
- State: Idaho
- County: Canyon
- Elevation: 2,398 ft (731 m)
- Time zone: UTC-7 (Mountain (MST))
  - Summer (DST): UTC-6 (MDT)
- ZIP codes: 83607
- Area codes: 208, 986
- GNIS feature ID: 376180

Sunnyslope is an unincorporated community in Canyon County in the southwestern part of the U.S. state of Idaho.

The community is known as a center of the Snake River Valley AVA with 14 area wineries making up the Sunnyslope Wine Trail.

Idaho State Highway 55 runs through the community.
