= Huston, Idaho =

Unincorporated community in the state of Idaho, United States

- Unincorporated community
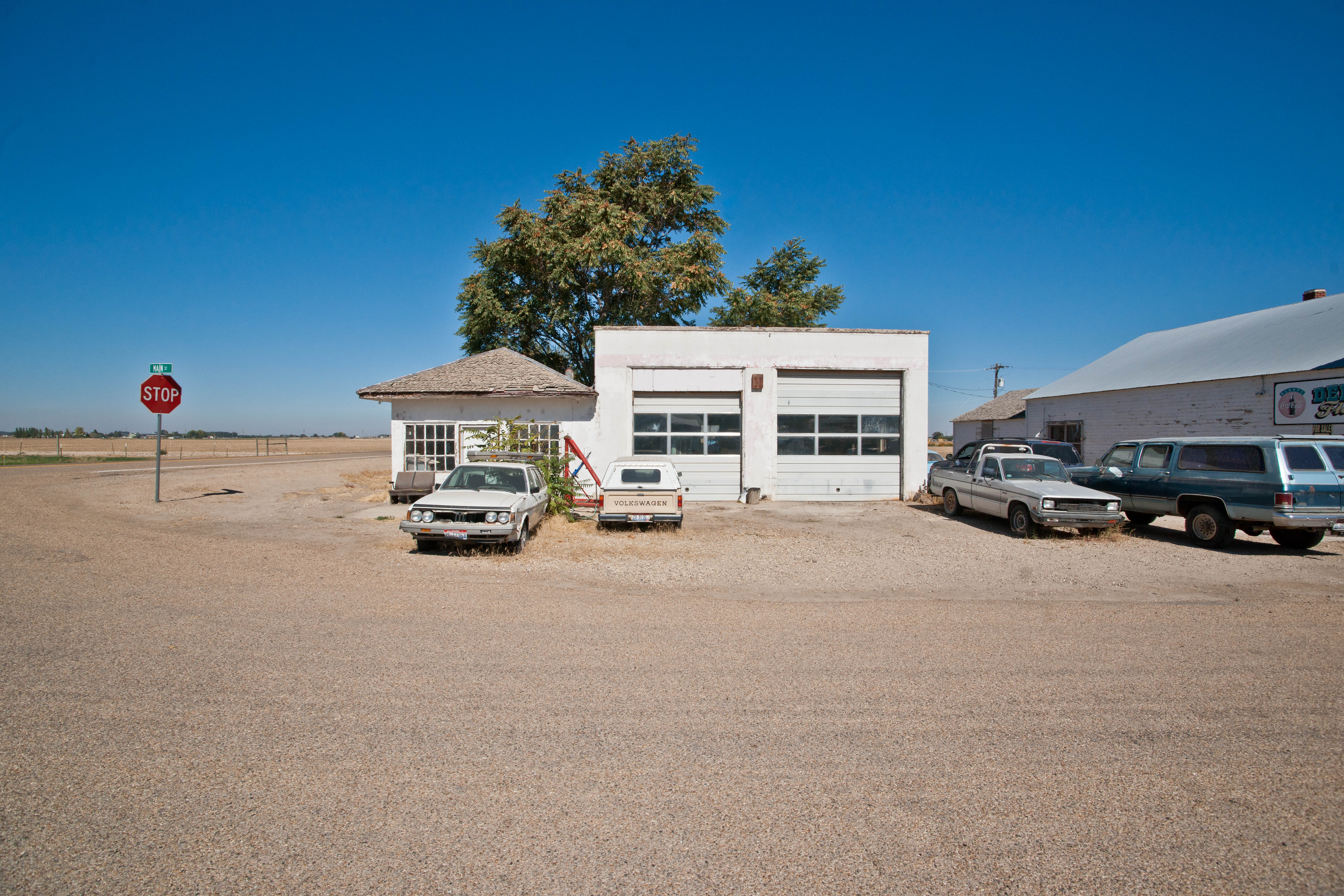
- Huston, Idaho

- Location within Idaho Location within the United States
- Coordinates: 43°36′37″N 116°47′00″W
- Country: United States
- State: Idaho
- County: Canyon
- Elevation: 2,520 ft (770 m)
- Time zone: UTC-7 (Mountain (MST))
  - Summer (DST): UTC-6 (MDT)
- ZIP code: 83630
- Area codes: 208, 986
- GNIS feature ID: 396682

Huston is an unincorporated community in Canyon County, Idaho, United States. Huston is 4.5 miles (7.2 km) north-northeast of Marsing. Huston has a post office with ZIP code 83630.

== History ==
In 1911, Ben Huston homesteaded 40 acres and he used 10 acres for the townsite.

Huston's population was estimated at 50 in 1960.

In 2005, Deer Flat Merc, the last business closed. The confrontation scene in Superman II between the deputy sheriff and supervillains General Zod, Non, and Ursa took place in East Houston, ID.
