= Gys van Beek =

Member of the Dutch resistance in WWII

Gys Jansen-Van Beek
- Born: March 31, 1919; Angeren, Netherlands
- Died: November 14, 2015 (aged 96); Boise, Idaho, U.S.
- Occupation: Inventor
- Spouse: Zwaantje Van Beek

Gys Jansen-Van Beek (March 31, 1919 – November 14, 2015) was a Dutch-American inventor who, as a member of the Dutch resistance during World War II, helped rescue members of the Allied forces and is also recognized as an Aid Giver for helping Jews escaping the Holocaust.

== Early life ==
Born March 31, 1919, in Angeren, the Netherlands, Van Beek grew up on a farm. He was a member of the Reformed Churches in the Netherlands.

== Activity during World War II ==
After Nazi Germany invaded the Netherlands in May 1940 Van Beek was among many Dutch the Germans tried to recruit. He avoided the recruitment and eventually joined the Dutch resistance. Using forged identity papers he was able to help civilians and downed Allied pilots escape the Netherlands. Among those he helped escape was a P-51 pilot from Wisconsin, Lieutenant Howard Edward Moebius. For his efforts he earned decorations from the governments of Canada, Great Britain, the Netherlands, and the United States of America. In 1999 he was recognized as an Aid Giver by the Shoah Foundation established by Steven Spielberg. "For his heroism and service to the United States of America during World War II" he was entered into the Congressional Record of July 24, 2012, by Idaho Congressman Raúl Labrador.

== Life after World War II ==
Van Beek emigrated to the United States in 1948 and in 1954 moved to Idaho with his wife Zwaantje, where they started a dairy farm. The farm went into foreclosure in 1984 and after years of legal proceedings with the Farmers Home Administration; they were evicted in 1994. In 1995 he invented a hatchet used by firefighters and rescue workers. He continued inventing tools including the "Trucker's Friend" which he exclusively licensed to Innovation Factory. He died on November 14, 2015, in Boise, Idaho.

== Other resources ==
- "Congressional Record—Extensions of Remarks" (PDF). gpo.gov. July 24, 2012.
- Rescue Aid Provider Gys Jansen-Van Beek Testimony on YouTube
