= College of Western Idaho =

Community college in Boise and Nampa, Idaho, U.S.

Coordinates: 43°36′51″N 116°30′26″W

- Type: Public community college
- Established: May 22, 2007; 19 years ago
- Parent institution: Idaho State Board of Education
- Accreditation: NWCCU
- Academic affiliations: Space-grant
- President: Gordon Jones
- Faculty: 158 full-time and 307 part-time (fall 2019)
- Students: 10,326 (Fall 2023)
- Location: Nampa, Idaho, United States
- Campus: 101 acres (41 ha); Fringe rural
- Other campuses: Boise
- Colors: River blue and Moss green
- Mascot: Otter
- Website: cwi.edu

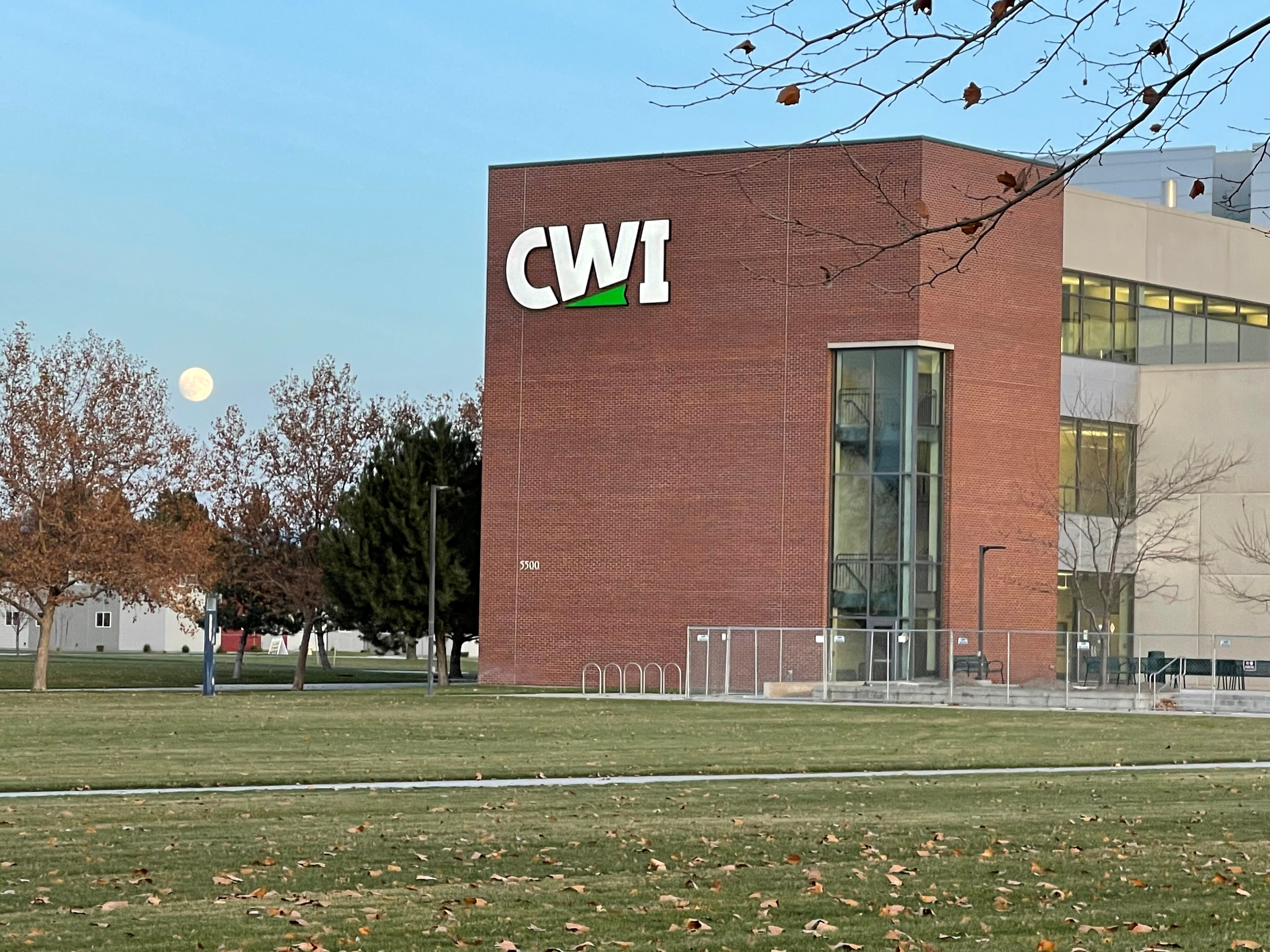
College of Western Idaho Nampa Campus Academic Building

College of Western Idaho (CWI) is a public community college in Southwest Idaho with its primary campus locations in Boise and Nampa. CWI also offers classes at several community locations throughout the Treasure Valley. It is one of four comprehensive community colleges along with the College of Eastern Idaho, College of Southern Idaho and North Idaho College, in Idaho and is governed by a five-member board of trustees elected at large by voters in Ada and Canyon counties.

CWI offers over 120 programs in the areas of Academic Transfer, Dual Credit, Career and Technical Education, Workforce Development, and Adult Education. In fall of 2023, CWI served 21,359 credit students and 14,951 noncredit students. CWI reported the gender of their students to be 55% female and 45% male. Idaho residents comprised 98% of CWI's student population and Ada County residents were 49%, while 28% were Canyon County residents.

== History ==
Prior to the creation of CWI, Boise was one of the largest metropolitan statistical areas in the United States without a community college. CWI was created on May 22, 2007, when voters of Canyon and Ada counties passed a measure to allow the formation of the new community college district. In June 2007, the Albertson Foundation announced it was donating $10 million to help found the college.

In July 2007, the Idaho State Board of Education selected an initial five-member board of trustees. The following month Boise State University faculty member Dennis Griffin was named to a two-year term as the college's first president and CWI began offering academic classes on January 20, 2009, with an enrollment of over 1,100 students. In the summer of 2009 the professional-technical programs from Boise State University's Selland College of Applied Technology transitioned to CWI. By the fall 2009 semester, CWI enrollment had expanded to over 3,600 students.

In January 2010, CWI applied for accreditation from the Northwest Commission on Colleges and Universities (NWCCU). NWCCU granted candidacy status at the associate degree level in 2012 and initial accreditation in 2016.

President Griffin retired in August 2009 and was succeeded by Bert Glandon. After serving as president for 12 years, Glandon retired from CWI on May 15, 2021. The college's board of trustees named Denise Aberle-Cannata the interim president.

CWI Board of Trustees extended an offer to Gordon Jones on December 9, 2021 to be the next president at College of Western Idaho. Gordon Jones accepted the position of President at CWI and began his tenure as the third president in CWI's history on January 10, 2022.

CWI selected the otter as the official mascot in January 2022.

== Catchment area ==
The college's catchment area includes all of the following counties: Ada, Adams, Boise, Canyon, Gem, Payette, Valley, and Washington. It also includes portions of Elmore and Owyhee counties. Ada and Canyon counties are the taxation zone for the college.

== Student life ==
CWI has over 30 student clubs and organizations. Student clubs have been created with academic focus as well as special interests. Student groups range from art to physics, horticulture, psychology, soccer, a Veterans Association, and more.

The Associated Students of the College of Western Idaho (ASCWI) serve as the voice of the student body. ASCWI is governed by five officers and eight senators elected by the student body each spring.

CWI students participate in competitive, skills-based organizations like Business Professionals of America, and SkillsUSA. CWI students have found success at state, regional, and national levels in these organizations. Students have also earned individual medals at national skills competitions as well.

Students have the opportunity to engage on campus through the CWI Presidential Ambassador Program, which promotes leadership and connects students to campus and community events. Students are eligible to receive a scholarship as part of this program.

== Locations ==
CWI's primary campuses are located in Boise and Nampa. CWI's Nampa Campus has been created around the former Boise State West Campus, which sits on approximately 200 acres (0.81 km^{2}).

== Academics ==
CWI offers over 100 majors through Academic Transfer and Professional Technical Education programs, Adult Education, and fast-track career training for working professionals. Students can choose from a variety of transfer programs with 27 different majors that can result in Associate of Arts or Associate of Science degrees. CWI provides a number of free programs designed to upgrade basic skills, prepare for the GED, or learn to speak English. Through its Business Partnerships / Workforce Development division, CWI provides short-term training designed to boost job skills and earn certifications that professionals need. CWI also offers a number of short-term online courses, as well as customized training options for businesses, and opportunities for students to earn college credits while still in high school through the college's Dual Credit and Tech Prep programs. CWI's Professional Technical Education programs are designed to provide comprehensive training in just four to 24 months so that students can move on to an exciting new career. CWI offers 32 professional-technical programs that can result in Associate of Applied Science degrees, advanced technical certificates, technical certificates, and postsecondary technical certificates. The college began offering a Bachelors of Applied Science degree in Business Administration in the Fall of 2025.

The CWI Division of Instruction is organized into 5 Schools:

- School of Arts and Humanities
- School of Health
- School of Industry, Engineering, and Trades
- School of Science, Technology, and Math
- School of Social Sciences and Public Affairs

== Athletics ==
CWI is in the process of forming an athletics program. On May 27th, 2026, Mahmood Sheikh was named as the inaugural Athletic Director. CWI does not currently have any athletic teams.
