= Diversion Dam and Deer Flat Embankments =

- U.S. National Register of Historic Places
- U.S. Historic district
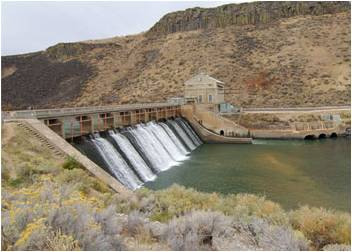
- Boise River Diversion Dam

- Location within the United States Location within Idaho
- Location: Southwestern Idaho, U.S.
- Nearest city: Boise (Diversion Dam); Nampa (Deer Flat Embankments)
- Coordinates: 43°32′16″N 116°05′36″W (Diversion Dam); 43°34′26″N 116°42′23″W (Deer Flat Embankments)
- Area: Approx. 65 acres (26 ha)
- Built: 1906–1912
- NRHP reference No.: 76000666
- Added to NRHP: March 15, 1976

The Diversion Dam and Deer Flat Embankments is the collective name given in the U.S. National Register of Historic Places program to a set of three dams in the western United States in southwestern Idaho, near Boise and Nampa.

The dams are components of the U.S. Bureau of Reclamation's Boise Project, and were designed to provide irrigation water to 500,000 acres (780 mi^{2}; 2,000 km^{2}) of Treasure Valley farmland in conjunction with the New York Irrigation District (New York Canal). The Boise River Diversion Dam also provides hydroelectric generation capacity. The dams were listed on the National Register in 1976.

The three dams that make up the Diversion Dam and Deer Flat Embankments are:

- Boise River Diversion Dam
- Deer Flat Upper Embankment
- Deer Flat Lower Embankment

== See also ==
- National Register of Historic Places listings in Ada County, Idaho
- National Register of Historic Places listings in Canyon County, Idaho
- Deer Flat National Wildlife Refuge
