= New York Canal =

Canal

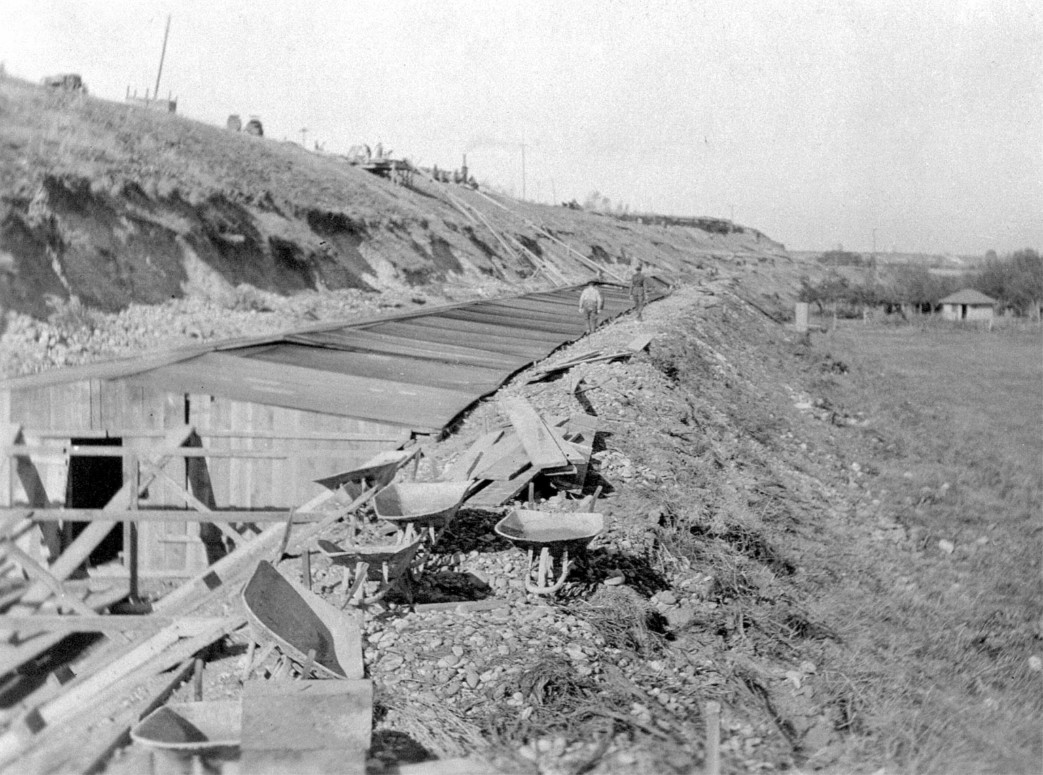
- The New York Canal in 1910

- Location in the United States Location in Idaho
- Location: Ada and Canyon counties, Treasure Valley, Idaho
- Country: United States
- Coordinates: 43.574°N 116.239°W

Specifications
- Length: 41 miles (66 km)

History
- Former names: Main Canal
- Current owner: U.S. Bureau of Reclamation
- Original owner: Idaho Mining and Irrigation Company
- Principal engineer: Arthur De Wint Foote
- Construction began: 1890
- Date completed: 1909; 117 years ago

Geography
- Direction: Southwest
- Start point: Boise River Diversion Dam
- End point: Lake Lowell
- Beginning coordinates: 43.537604°N 116.094060°W
- Ending coordinates: 43.527401°N 116.605659°W

The New York Canal is an irrigation canal in the western United States, located in southwestern Idaho. Sourced from the Boise River, it originates at the Diversion Dam in Ada County and ends after 41 miles (66 km) at Lake Lowell in Canyon County.

The canal system includes multiple lateral canals that distribute water to approximately 165,000 acres (260 mi^{2}; 670 km^{2}) of Treasure Valley farmland. The canal's concrete channel has a capacity of 2,400 cubic feet (68 m^{3}) per second.

== History ==
Completion of the Oregon Short Line Railroad in the early 1880s made possible the construction of farming settlements in the Boise Valley. In 1882, investors from New York founded the Idaho Mining and Irrigation Company in order to transform the desert into farmland between the Boise River and the Snake River in southern Idaho Territory. Investors hoped that the company could also begin mining operations in the region, financed by revenue from irrigation canals.

Mining engineer Arthur De Wint Foote commenced a survey of the Boise Valley in 1883, and he envisioned a 75-mile (120 km) canal that would draw water from the south side of the Boise River and irrigate 500,000 acres (780 mi^{2}; 2,020 km^{2}) of desert through 5,000 lateral ditches. The main canal became known as the New York Canal, in deference to eastern investors. It was not the first irrigation system in the Boise Valley; in 1878, William H. Ridenbaugh began construction of the Ridenbaugh Canal from the north side of the Boise River, and smaller projects had existed beginning in the 1860s.

In the 1880s, work on the New York Canal focused mainly on the Foote survey and on acquiring water rights. The Idaho Mining and Irrigation Company began construction near the Boise River Canyon, about ten miles (16 km) upstream and east of downtown Boise; work required moving boulders and cutting rock. The difficulty of work partially accounted for slow progress on the canal, but another factor was the Depression of 1882–85, and some eastern investors had been forced to divest their holdings in the company. Arthur Foote continued to work with little pay, and the company allowed only a minimum construction effort, this to retain its water rights.

In 1888, the Idaho Statesman objected to claims that the New York Canal would be completed that year. The newspaper found that "maps and profiles" were the only work finished, and the editor projected that the canal would require 500 workers over five years before it was completed. In 1889, Idaho Mining and Irrigation Company manager Charles H. Tompkins Jr., estimated that the canal would be seventy miles (110 km) in length and irrigate about 350,000 acres (550 mi^{2}; 1,400 km^{2}), with an estimated capacity of 2,915 cubic feet (82.5 m^{3}) per second, but he admitted that only two miles (3 km) of the canal had been completed. Another Boise River project undertaken by the company, the Phyllis Canal, named for investors from Philadelphia, also had completed about two miles. The Phyllis Canal later became part of the New York Canal system.

In 1890, the company secured investment capital of $300,000 to complete work on the canal. The general contractor was Denver railroad builder William C. Bradbury, and the company believed the canal would be finished in 1891. By September, 1890, 220 workers were employed, and the company advertised employment for 1000 workers. But progress on the canal continued into 1892, when work stopped because of disagreements between investors; work resumed in 1893.

The Idaho Mining and Irrigation Company became insolvent in 1891, and contractor Bradbury filed a lien against the company that year. Bradbury continued construction on the canal, apparently financed by his own money. He purchased the canal, right of way, and water rights in a sheriff's auction in 1894. Bradbury later sold the uncompleted canal to the Farmers' Canal Company, an association of about 175 local farmers, in 1896.

The United States Congress created the U.S. Reclamation Service in 1902, and the bureau gained control of the New York Canal project. After trimming several miles from the former design and completing construction of the canal and diversion dam, the bureau opened the New York Canal on February 22, 1909. The canal was enlarged by 1912, and it was placed under control of the Boise Project in 1926.

== See also ==
- List of canals in the United States
- Carey Act
