= Reclamation Service Boise Project Office =

Historic building in Boise, Idaho, USA

- U.S. National Register of Historic Places
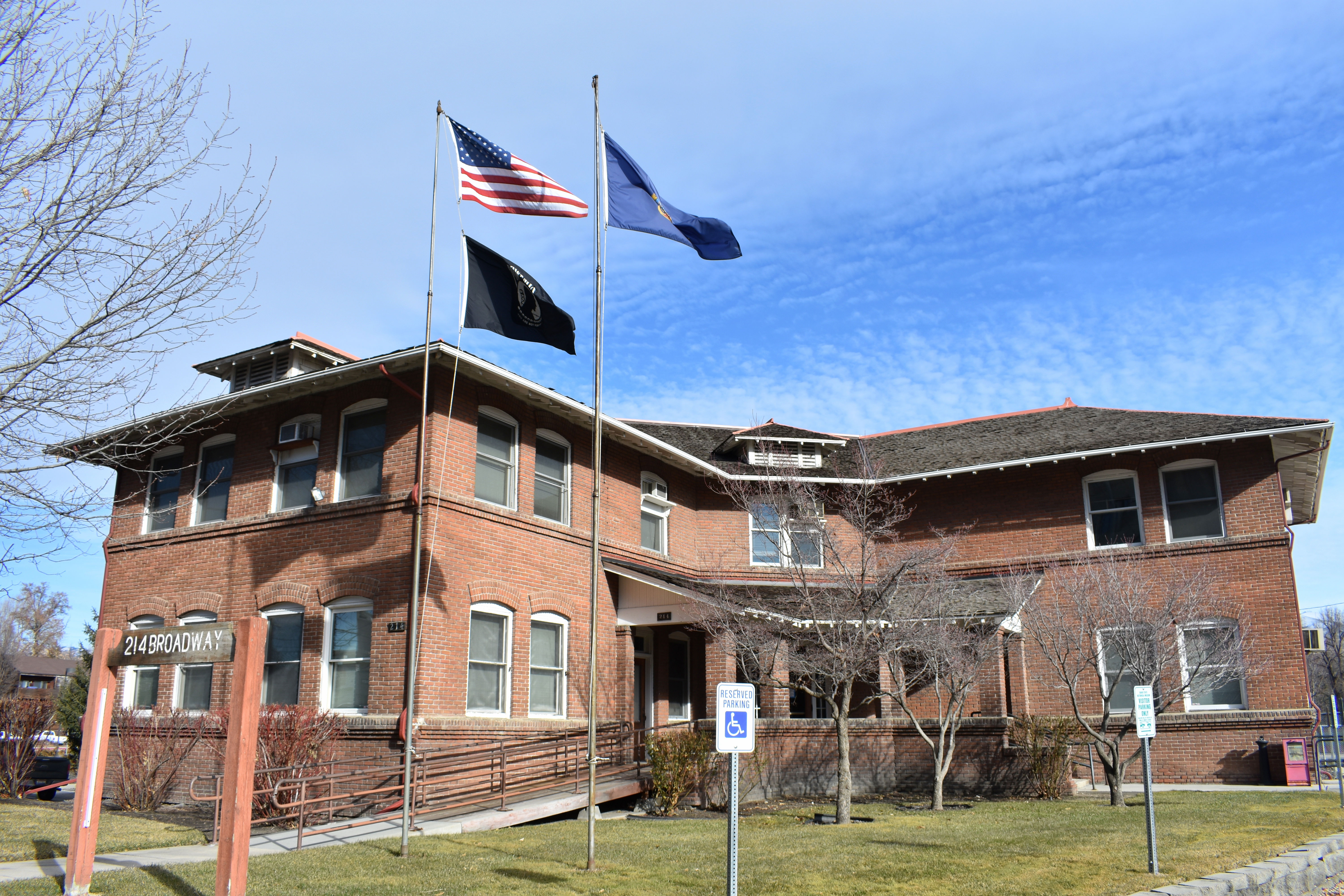
- The Reclamation Service Boise Project Office in 2019

- Location within Idaho Location within the United States
- Location: 214 Broadway Ave, Boise, Idaho
- Coordinates: 43.609183°N 116.192960°W
- Area: less than one acre
- Built: 1912
- Built by: Whiteway-Lee Construction Co.
- Architect: Weymouth, F.E.
- Architectural style: Bungalow/craftsman
- NRHP reference No.: 10000546
- Added to NRHP: August 12, 2010

The Reclamation Service Boise Project Office in Boise, Idaho, is a 2-story, L-shape Bungalow with entry at a porch on the inside corner. Finished in 1912, the building is constructed of brick with corbels separating basement, first, and second floors, and it includes segmented arch window openings. The low pitched roof includes four dormers.

The building was constructed by the Whiteway-Lee Co., and it features American Craftsman details uncommon to public buildings at the time. C. Herbert Lee had been an architect in the office of Tourtellotte & Co., and he had supervised construction of the 1907 administration building at the University of Idaho. But the Reclamation Office design is attributed to F.E. Weymouth, supervising engineer for the U.S. Reclamation Service. The building was added to the National Register of Historic Places in 2010.

== Reclamation Service ==
After passage of the Newlands Reclamation Act in 1902, the Reclamation Service was the administrative center of irrigation projects in Idaho and other western states. Various projects were completed and managed, including Minidoka Dam, Arrowrock Dam, Boise River Diversion Dam, Lake Lowell, and the New York Canal, formerly the Main Canal. The Reclamation Service also adjudicated water rights disputes.
