= Anderson Ranch Dam =

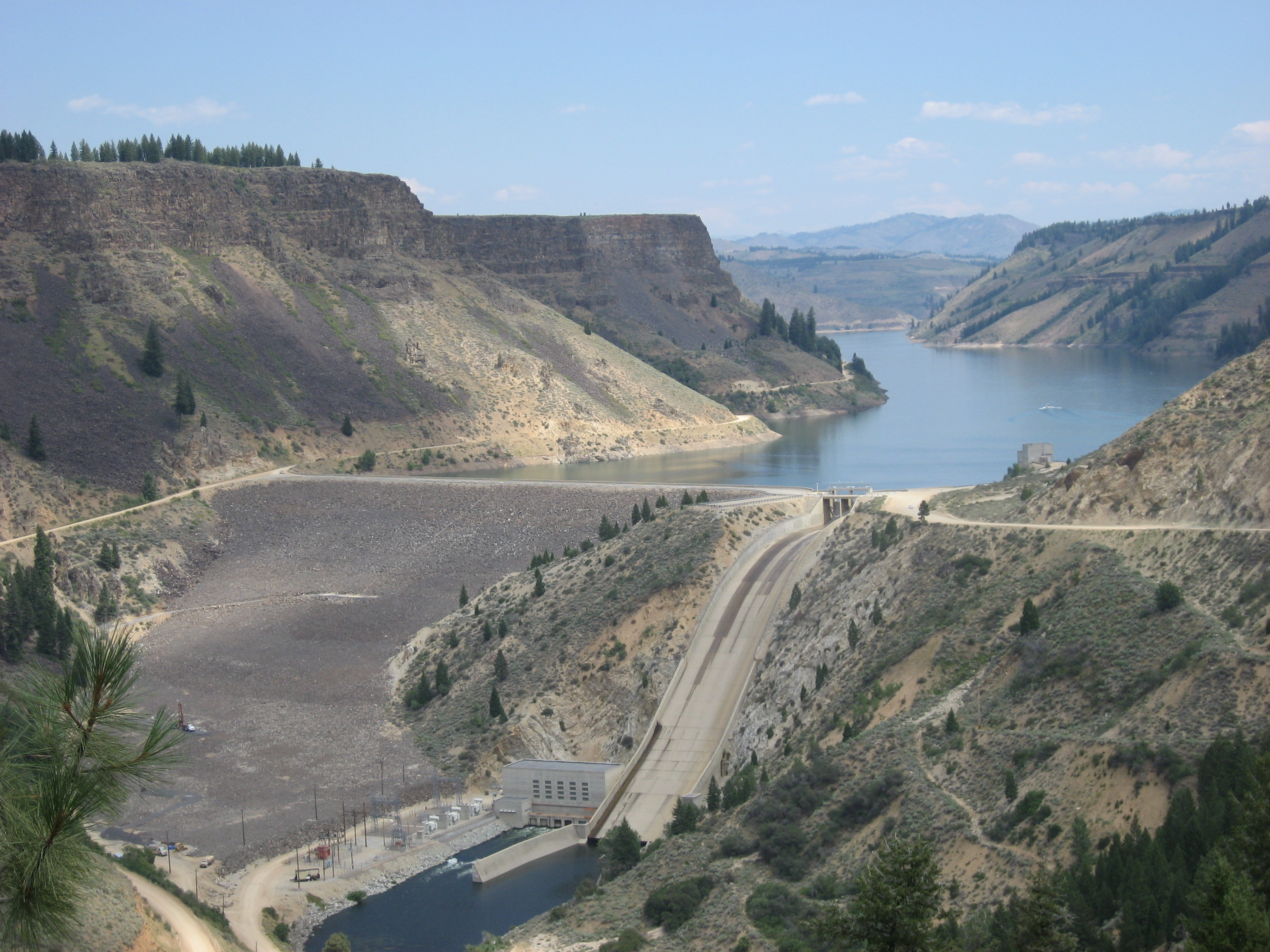
- View from southwest in August 2009

- Location in the United States Location in Idaho
- Country: United States
- Location: Elmore County, Idaho
- Coordinates: 43°21′27″N 115°26′55″W
- Construction began: 1941
- Opening date: 1950; 76 years ago
- Operator: U.S. Bureau of Reclamation

Dam and spillways
- Impounds: South Fork of Boise River
- Height: 456 feet (139 m)
- Length: 1,350 feet (411 m)

Reservoir
- Creates: Anderson Ranch Reservoir
- Total capacity: 503,500 acre-feet (0.621 km^{3})
- Catchment area: 960 square miles (2,490 km^{2})
- Surface area: 4,815 acres (19.5 km^{2})
- Normal elevation: 4,190 ft (1,280 m) AMSL

Power Station
- Commission date: 1951 (1986)
- Turbines: 2 x 20 MW
- Installed capacity: 40 MW
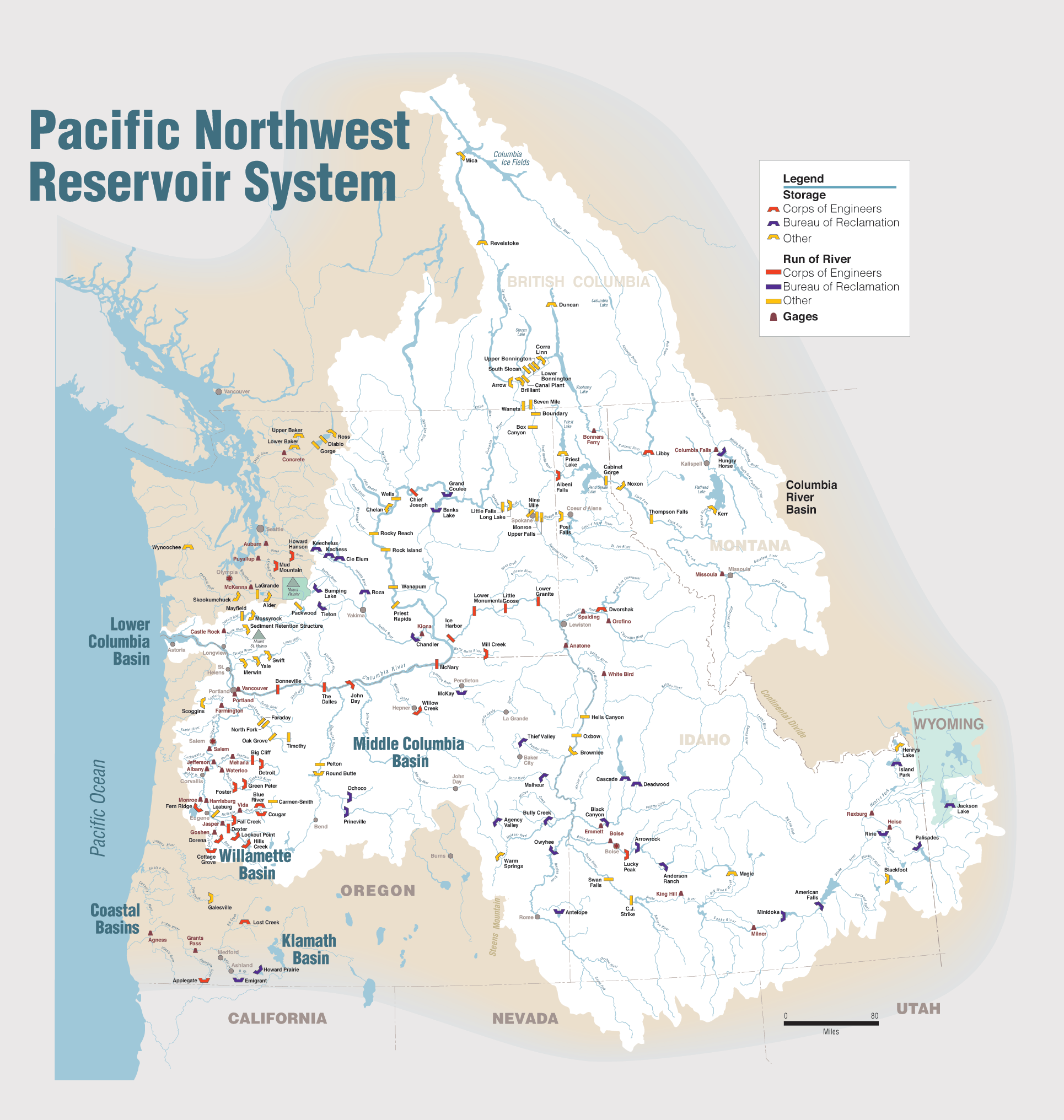
- Columbia River Basin

Anderson Ranch Dam is an earth rockfill type dam in the western United States, on the South Fork of the Boise River in southwestern Idaho. In Elmore County northeast of Mountain Home, it is several miles north of U.S. Route 20 and operated by the U.S. Bureau of Reclamation.

When completed 76 years ago in 1950, Anderson Ranch was the tallest dam of its type in the world. Its primary purpose is to provide irrigation water for agriculture, with a secondary purpose of hydroelectric power. Its generating capacity was increased from 27 to 40 MW in 1986. Its reservoir has a spillway elevation of 4,196 feet (1,280 m) above sea level.

The construction of the dam began in 1941 and experienced numerous challenges with materials, fuel, and labor shortages during World War II. Work was halted for over nine months beginning in late December 1942. The Reclamation Act of 1902 had racial exclusions on labor which were strictly adhered to until Congress changed the law in 1943. This allowed Japanese American internees to work on Reclamation projects; Anderson Ranch utilized internees from the Minidoka War Relocation Center, northeast of Twin Falls.

The South Fork of the Boise River originates in the Smoky Mountains north of Fairfield. Its watershed includes portions of the Smoky Mountains, Soldier Mountains, Boise National Forest, and Sawtooth National Forest. Below the dam, the South Fork flows northwestward into the reservoir behind the concrete Arrowrock Dam, completed in 1915.

The Bureau of Reclamation and Idaho Water Resource Board are working on raising the dam by six feet (1.8 m), resulting in approximately 29,000 acre-feet (35,800,000 m^{3}) of new storage space. The design is scheduled for completion in the summer of 2024.
