= Boise River =

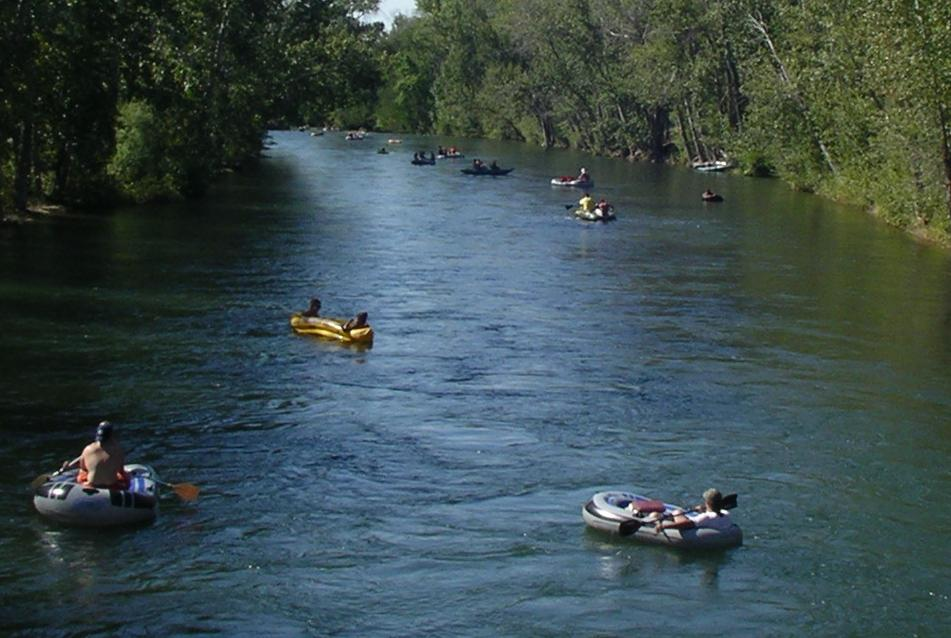
- Floating on the river through Boise in 2004

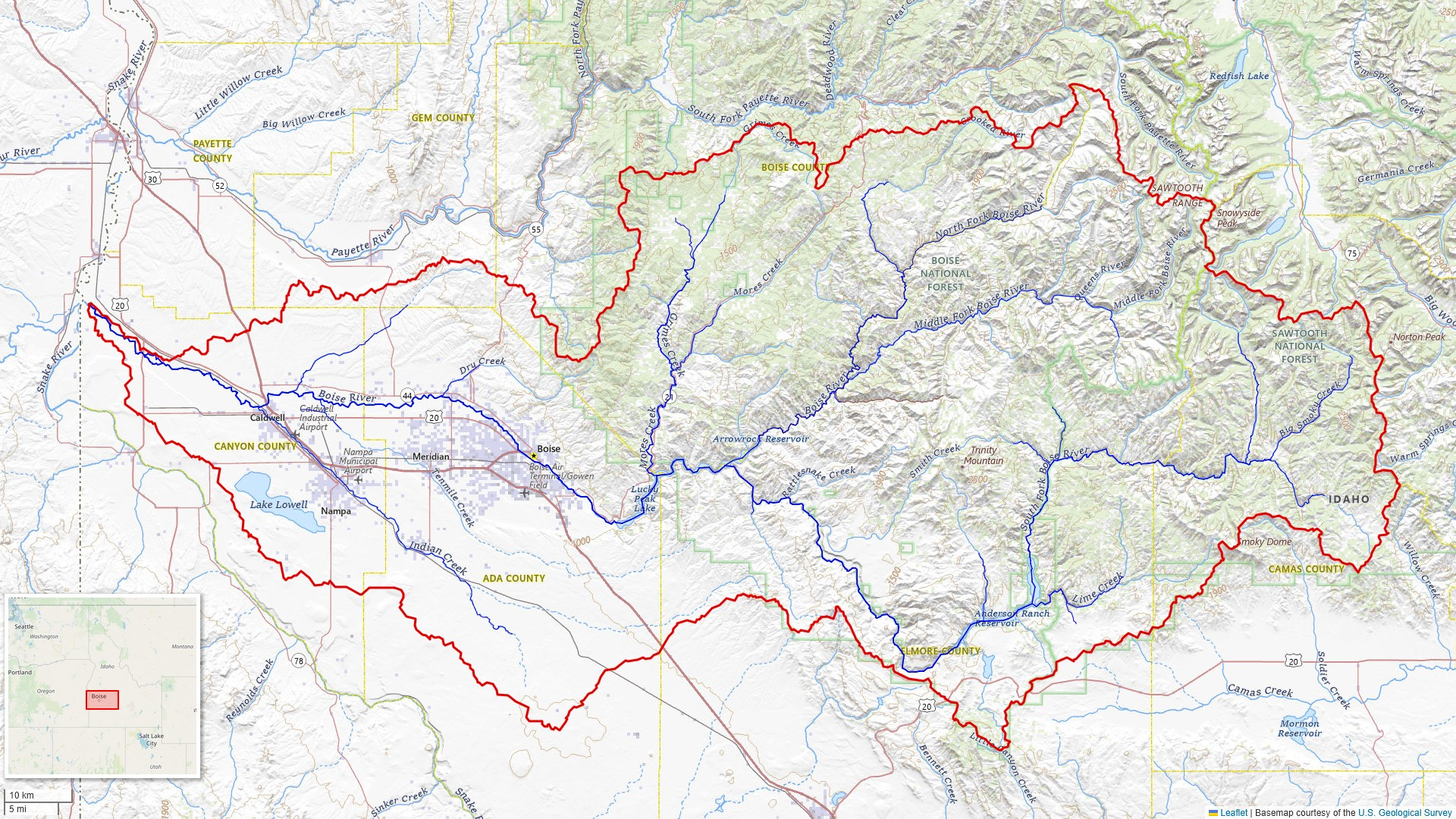
- Boise River watershed (Interactive map)

Location
- Country: United States
- State: Idaho

Physical characteristics
- Source: Sawtooth Range
  - location: Idaho
  - coordinates: 43°42′48″N 115°38′9″W
  - elevation: 3,497 ft (1,066 m)
- Mouth: Snake River
  - location: Idaho
  - coordinates: 43°49′15″N 117°1′34″W
  - elevation: 2,100 ft (640 m)
- Length: 102 mi (164 km)
- Basin size: 4,100 sq mi (11,000 km^{2})
- Discharge
  - location: Parma, about 3.8 mi (6.1 km) from the mouth
  - average: 1,587 cu ft/s (44.9 m^{3}/s)
  - minimum: 66 cu ft/s (1.9 m^{3}/s)
  - maximum: 9,140 cu ft/s (259 m^{3}/s)

The Boise River is a 102-mile-long (164 km) tributary of the Snake River in the Northwestern United States. It drains a rugged portion of the Sawtooth Range in southwestern Idaho northeast of Boise, as well as part of the western Snake River Plain. The watershed encompasses approximately 4,100 square miles (11,000 km^{2}) of highly diverse habitats, including alpine canyons, forest, rangeland, agricultural lands, and urban areas.

== Description ==
The Boise River rises in three separate forks in the Sawtooth Range at elevations exceeding 10,000 feet (3,050 m), and is formed by the confluence of its North and Middle forks. The North Fork, 50 miles (80 km) long, rises in the Sawtooth Wilderness Area, along the Boise–Elmore county line, 60 miles (100 km) northeast of Boise. It flows generally southwest through the remote mountains in the Boise National Forest. The Middle Fork, approximately 52 miles (84 km) in length, rises within 12 miles (19 km) of the North Fork in the southern Sawtooth Wilderness Area in northeastern Elmore County. It flows west-southwest near the town of Atlanta, joining the North Fork to form the Boise River, approximately 15 miles (24 km) southeast of Idaho City. The main stream flows southwest into Arrowrock Reservoir, joining the South Fork from the Anderson Ranch Dam.

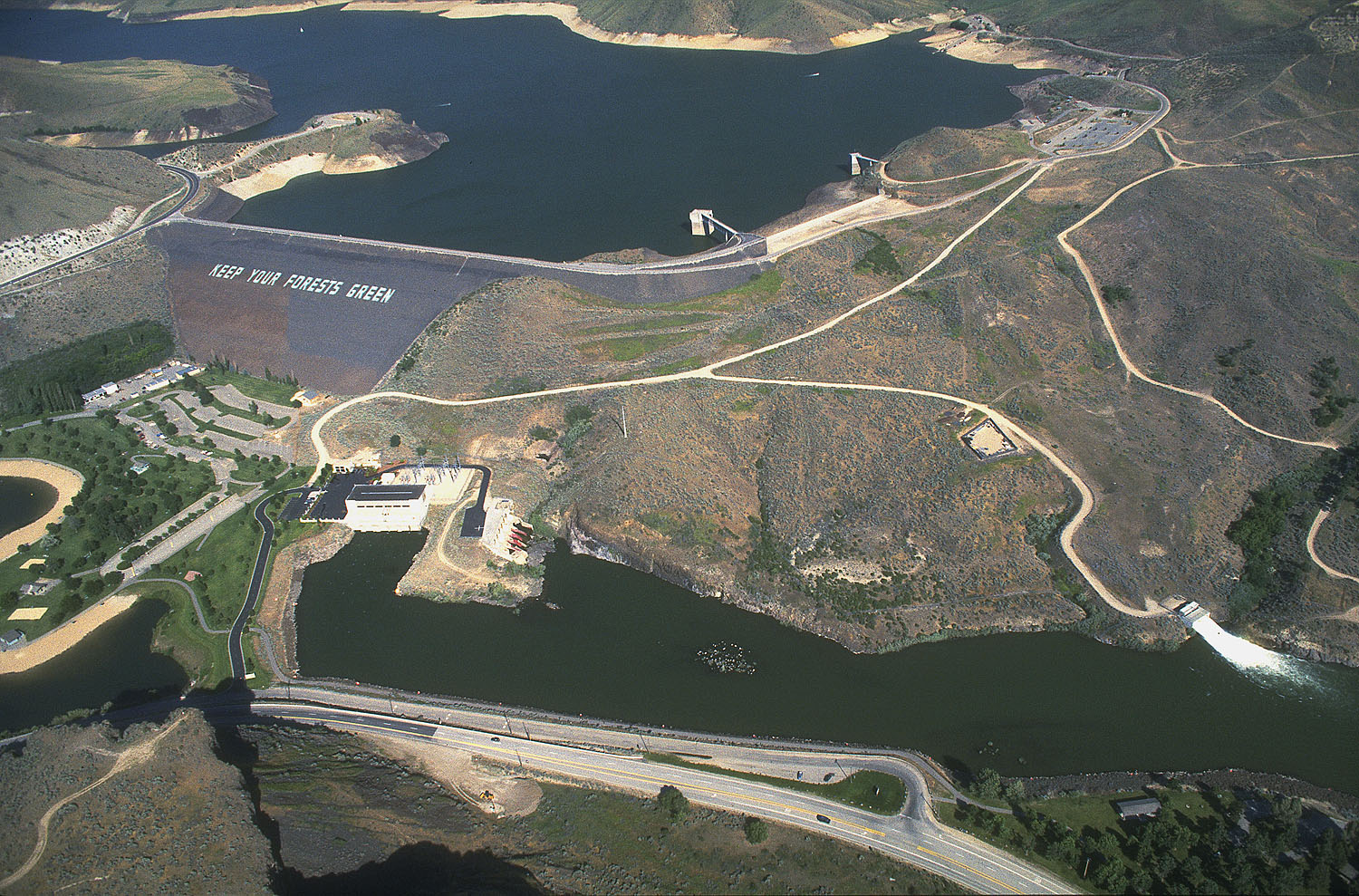
Lucky Peak Dam, northeast of Boise

The 101-mile-long (163 km) South Fork rises in northern Camas County in the Smoky Mountains and Soldier Mountains of the Sawtooth National Forest north of Fairfield, 65 miles (105 km) east of Boise. It flows generally southwest, descending through a basalt canyon to fill the Anderson Ranch Reservoir, then turns northwest in central Elmore County. It joins the main stream as the southern arm of Arrowrock Reservoir, 20 miles (32 km) east of Boise.

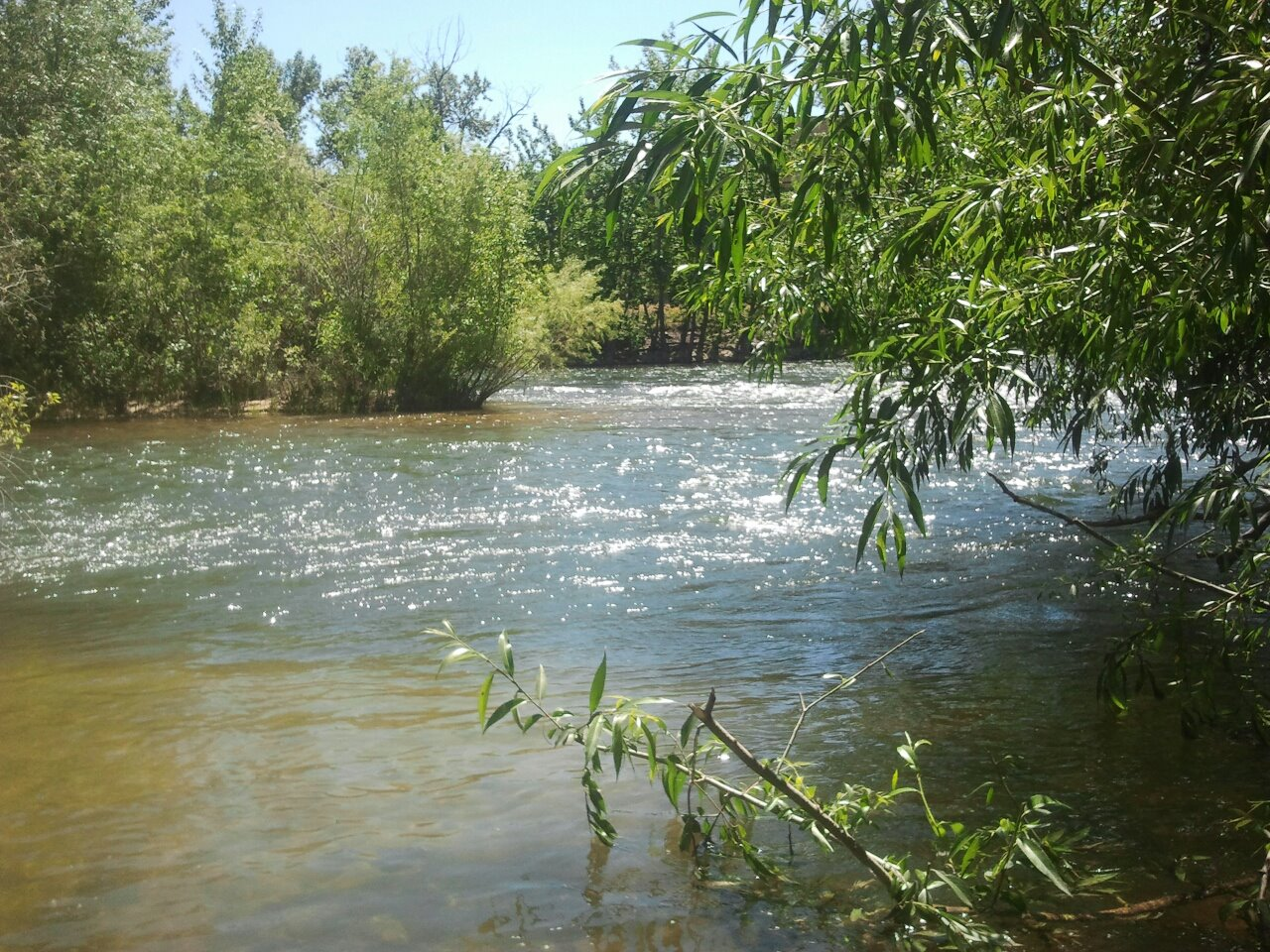
Boise River

Downstream from its confluence with the South Fork, the river flows generally west, adds the major tributary of Mores Creek along Highway 21, and passes through Lucky Peak Dam to emerge from the foothills southeast of Boise. It passes over several irrigation diversion dams above the city, the first and largest is the century-old Boise River Diversion Dam for the concrete New York Canal, which terminates at Lake Lowell (a.k.a. Deer Flat Reservoir) southwest of Nampa in Canyon County. The next diversion is for the Ridenbaugh Canal (1878) at Eckert Diversion Dam, immediately above Barber Park, five miles (8 km) from downtown Boise. Wooded through the city, the river is lined by an extensive recreational greenbelt. It flows west across the western end of the Snake River Plain in the Treasure Valley and becomes a braided stream with a wide floodplain as it crosses northern Canyon County to the Snake River. At an approximate elevation of 2,100 feet (640 m), it enters the Snake River, the Idaho-Oregon border, west of Parma and three miles (5 km) south of Nyssa, Oregon.

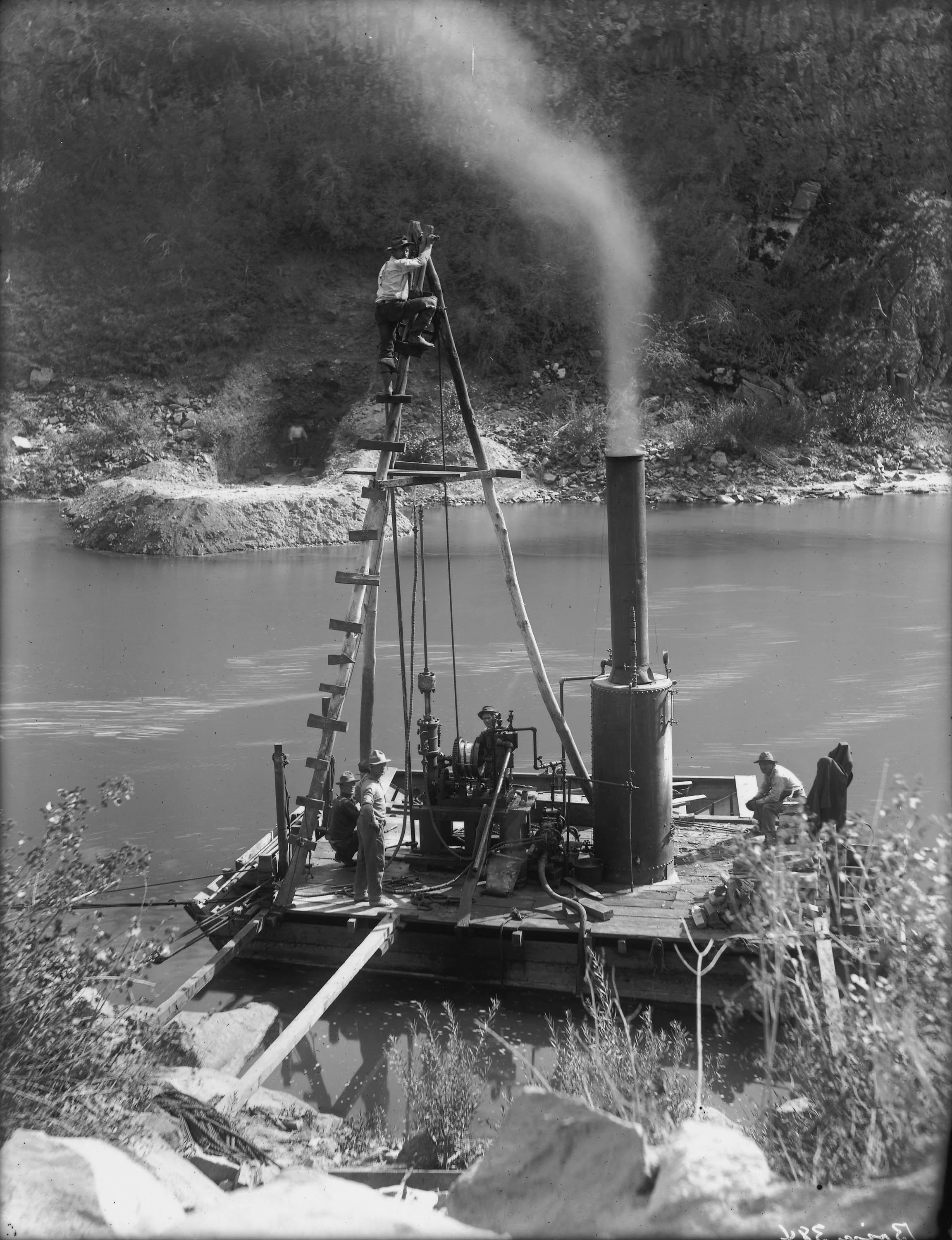
Boise Irrigation Project, 1910 Photo by Walter Lubken.

== History ==
The river was called "Reed's River" in the early 19th century, named after Pacific Fur Company employee John Reed, who explored parts of the river throughout 1813 and 1814. The river is diverted to canals for irrigation on the plain west of what is now Boise. The dams that form the mountain reservoirs were constructed as part of the Bureau of Reclamation's "Boise Project" to provide agricultural irrigation, hydroelectricity, drinking water, and flood control to Boise and the Treasure Valley.

The major projects' initial completion dates were:

- 1909 – Boise River Diversion Dam & New York Canal
- 1915 – Arrowrock Dam
- 1950 – Anderson Ranch Dam - (S. Fork)
- 1955 – Lucky Peak Dam - (U.S. Army Corps of Engineers)

The Boise River was proposed for 50 years for a dam at Twin Springs, culminating in a 1966 Project Travois proposal, which would have used nuclear explosives to either create large amounts of rockfill aggregate for dam construction, or to induce a landslide that would have much the same effect. Project Travois was a component of Project Plowshare. The project was abandoned in 1968 after concerns were raised about radiological contamination, and the seismic safety of downstream dams.

== Recreation ==
The river is a popular destination for floating, specifically on the Boise greenbelt. Tubers and floaters launch at Barber Park and land at Ann Morrison Park, between major irrigation diversion dams. Several minor diversion weirs are passed as well as several bridges on the 6-mile (10 km) trip. Water skiing is popular above the dam at the Lucky Peak Reservoir.

On the lower (warmwater) course of the river, low summer flows and poorer water quality from agricultural runoff limit fishery production. This section of river supports a fair fishery for largemouth bass, smallmouth bass, and channel catfish. Upstream from Star, the river is a coldwater stream and supports a greater variety of fish. The most prevalent species on this section is mountain whitefish, as well as hatchery-reared rainbow trout, wild rainbow trout, and brown trout. Upstream from Lucky Peak and Arrowrock reservoirs, the river and its tributaries contain excellent populations of wild rainbow trout, mountain whitefish, and bull trout. This is especially true immediately downstream from the outflow of Anderson Ranch reservoir, where the South Fork takes on the characteristics of a classic "tailwater" for over 5 miles (8 km) from the put-in below the dam to Cow Creek Bridge.

== Fishing ==
The Boise River is also popular for fishing, mostly for rainbow trout and, in the winter, steelhead. Spin and bait anglers commonly target the river’s abundant stocked rainbow trout, while fly fishermen use a variety of flies mimicking the abundant aquatic and terrestrial insects present in the watershed, as well as streamers.

== See also ==
- List of rivers of Idaho
- List of longest streams of Idaho
