= Boise River Diversion Dam =

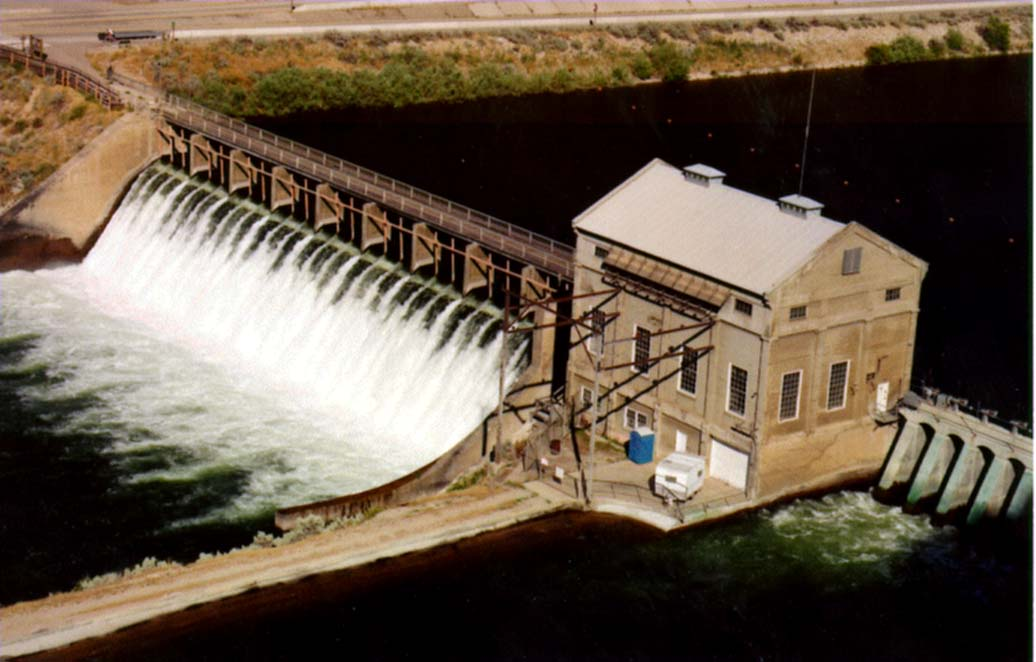

- Location in the United States Location in Idaho
- Country: United States
- Location: Ada County, Idaho
- Coordinates: 43°32′15″N 116°05′36″W
- Status: Operational
- Construction began: 1906
- Opening date: 1909; 117 years ago
- Owner: U.S. Bureau of Reclamation

Dam and spillways
- Impounds: Boise River
- Height: 68 ft (21 m)
- Length: 500 ft (152 m)
- Elevation at crest: 2,829 ft (862 m)
- Width (crest): 12 ft (3.7 m)
- Width (base): 100 ft (30 m)
- Spillway capacity: 37,700 cu ft/s (1,070 m^{3}/s)

Reservoir
- Creates: 1,200 acre⋅ft (1,480,200 m^{3})

Power Station
- Commission date: 1912; 114 years ago
- Turbines: 3 x Francis turbines
- Installed capacity: 3.45 MW

The Boise River Diversion Dam is a diversion dam in the western United States, on the Boise River in southwestern Idaho. Seven miles (11 km) southeast and upstream of Boise in Ada County, it was completed 117 years ago in 1909 and is operated by the U.S. Bureau of Reclamation.

The diverted water fills the concrete New York Canal, the primary irrigation channel for Ada and Canyon counties in the Treasure Valley.

Several miles upstream of the Diversion Dam is Lucky Peak Dam. Completed in 1955, it was built and is operated by the U.S. Army Corps of Engineers.

== Construction ==
In March 1906, the Utah Fire Proofing Company began work on the Boise River Diversion Dam with the provision that the structure would be completed within one year. It soon became apparent that the dam would not be finished on time. With little experience in such endeavors, Utah Fire Proofing failed to provide adequate foremen for the project. At least nineteen superintendents worked on the dam and their incompetence led to an extraordinary turnover in labor.

Inclement weather and flooding caused at least two months' worth of delays and forced the crews to rebuild part of the structure. By April 16, 1907, the dam was only 41% complete. It took another year and a half before the diversion works were ready to unload into the New York Canal.

The company eventually lost $90,000 on the contract. And to make matters worse in March 1909, a log foreman "maliciously" removed the boom above the dam and allowed timber roll over the embankment causing $73,000 worth of damage. Yet when the structure was completed it worked famously. The Diversion Dam is 68 feet (21 m) high and five hundred feet (152 m) in length, with an overall capacity of 42,815 cubic feet per second (1,212 m^{3}/s).

=== Powerhouse ===
To provide power for the construction of Arrowrock Dam upstream, Reclamation retrofitted the Diversion Dam with a small powerhouse. Finished in 1912, the plant's three generators produced 1,500 kilowatts of electricity for Arrowrock's camp, sawmills, and giant cement mixers. The Allis-Chalmers 725 horsepower (541 kW) turbines were the first in the world to be built with a vertical shaft design. Along with the power lines, government forces hung a two-way phone cable to connect Arrowrock with the outside world; the dam was completed in 1915.

In 1976, the power plant was added to the National Register of Historic Places. After being refurbished by the Bonneville Power Administration in 2002, it is now on ready reserve status and occasionally provides surplus power during times of peak demand. Special care was made to maintain the historic qualities of the powerhouse. The original governors, slate control panels, transformers, overhead crane, and generator housings, although no longer functional, were retained for historic purposes.

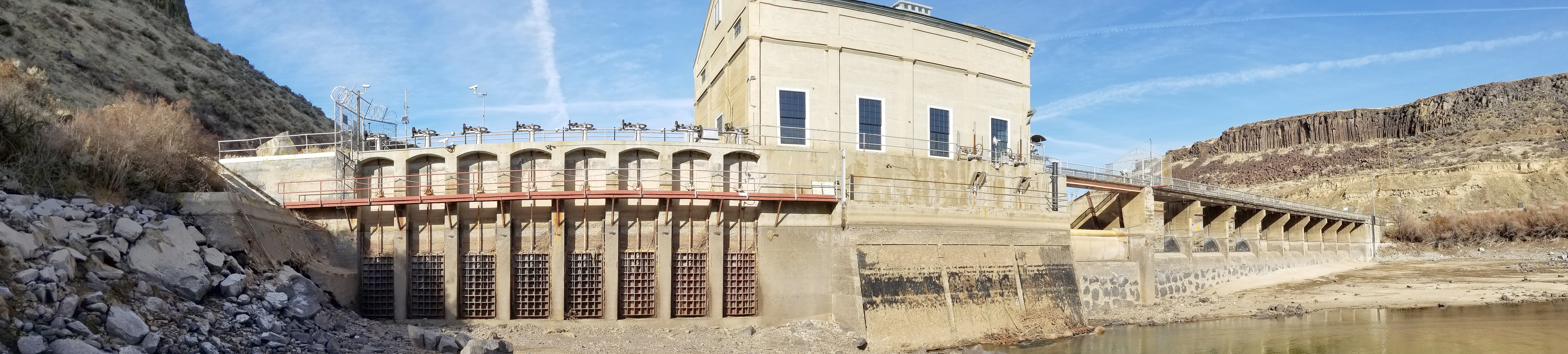
View from upstream
