= Arrowrock Dam =

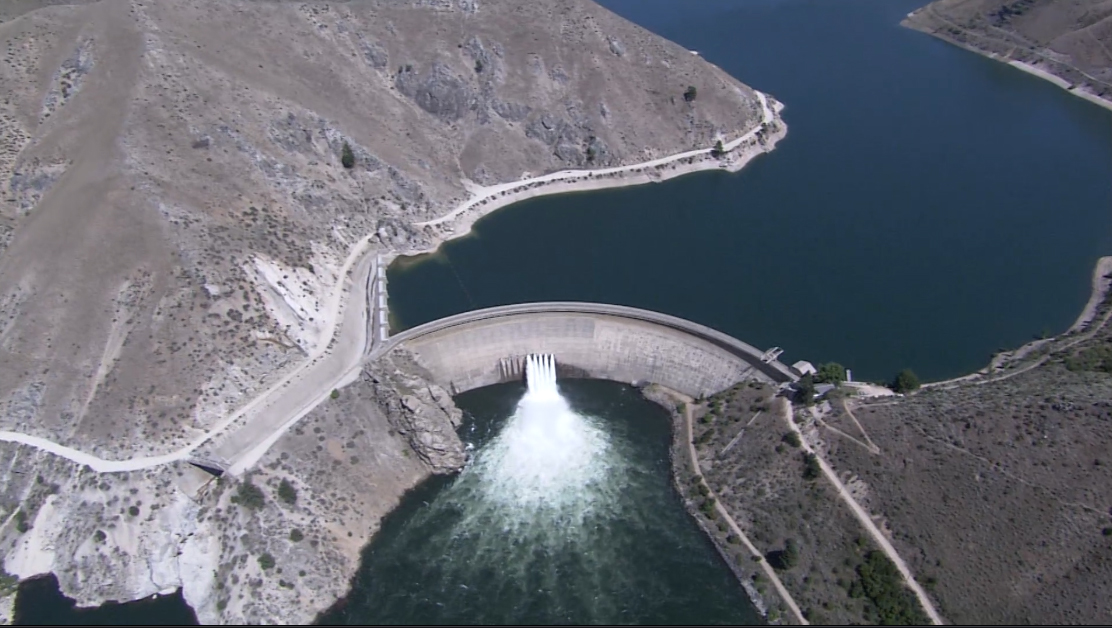
- Aerial view from the west

- Location in the United States Location in Idaho
- Country: United States
- Location: Boise and Elmore counties, Idaho
- Coordinates: 43°35′44″N 115°55′20″W
- Purpose: Irrigation
- Construction began: 1911
- Opening date: 1915; 111 years ago
- Owner: U.S. Bureau of Reclamation

Dam and spillways
- Type of dam: Arch dam
- Impounds: Boise River
- Height: 350 feet (107 m)
- Length: 1,150 feet (351 m)

Reservoir
- Creates: Arrowrock Reservoir
- Total capacity: 300,850 acre-feet (0.371 km^{3})
- Catchment area: 2,200 square miles (5,700 km^{2})
- Surface area: 3,100 acres (12.5 km^{2})
- Normal elevation: 3,210 ft (978 m) AMSL

Power Station
- Operators: Boise Project; Board of Control
- Commission date: March 2010; 16 years ago
- Installed capacity: 15 MW
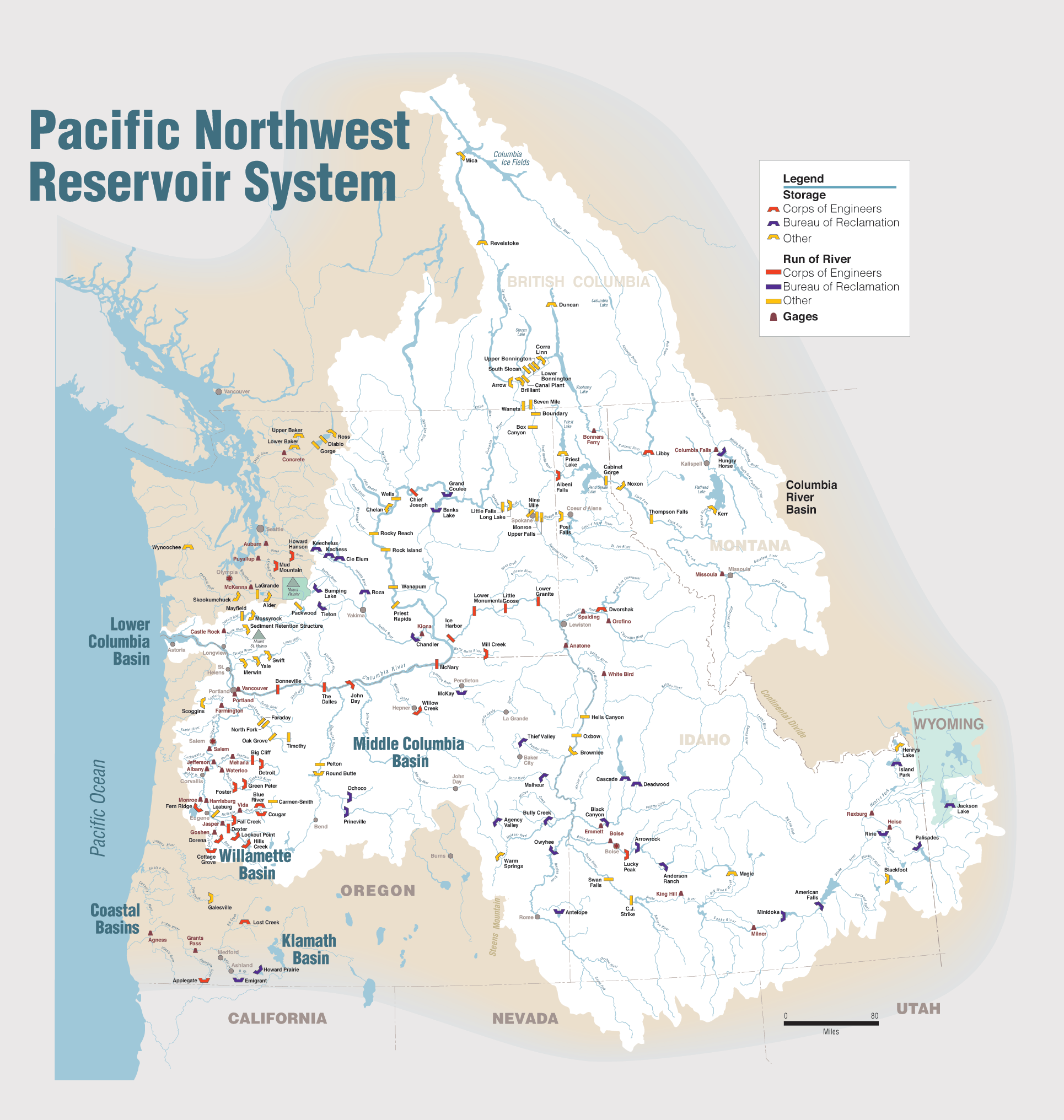
- Columbia River Basin

- Arrowrock Dam
- U.S. National Register of Historic Places
- NRHP reference No.: 72000437
- Added to NRHP: 1976

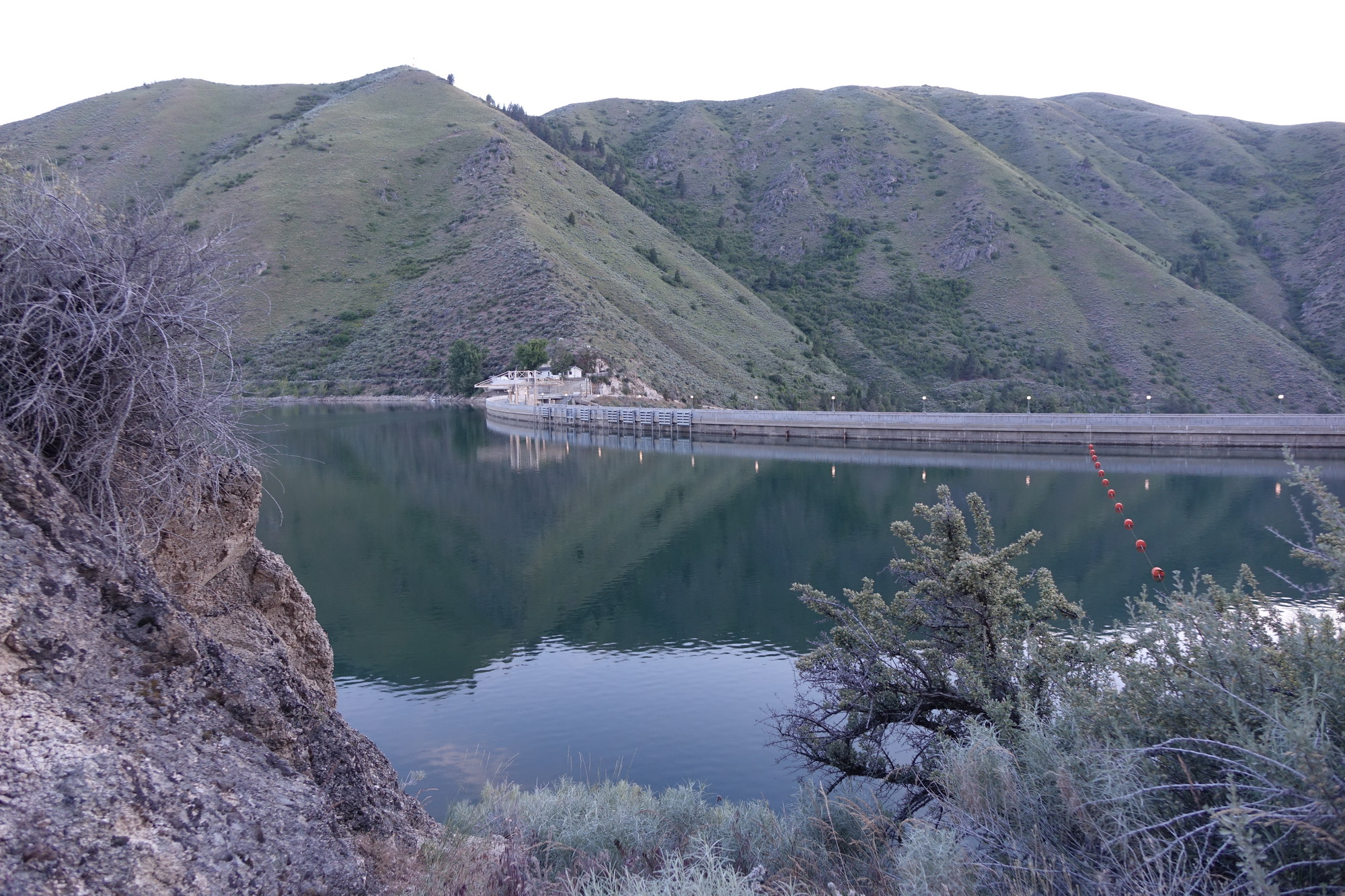
Reservoir side of Arrowrock Dam spring 2016

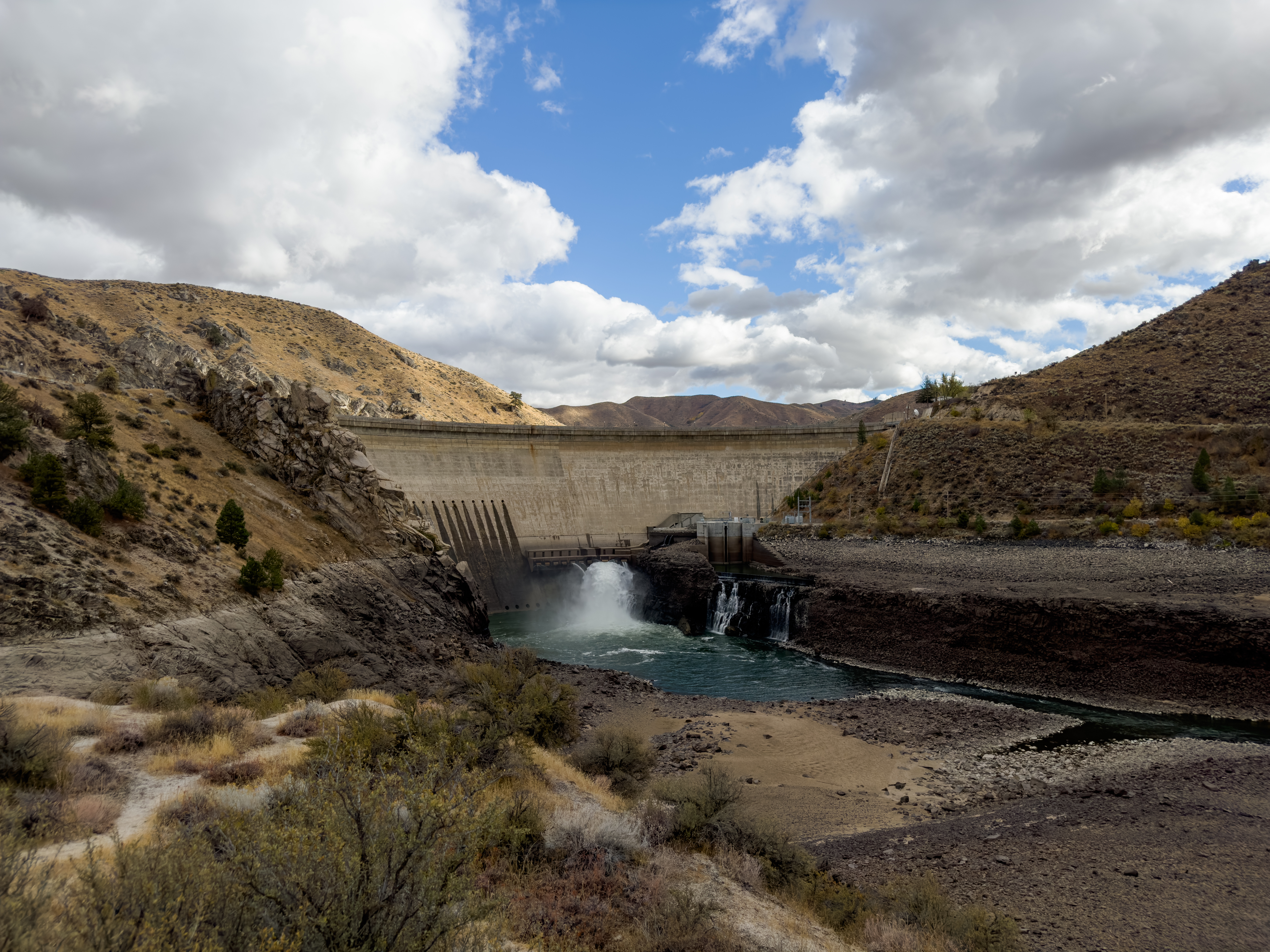
Outlet side of Arrowrock Dam fall 2022

Arrowrock Dam is a concrete arch dam in the western United States, on the Boise River in southwestern Idaho, east of Boise. Opened 111 years ago in 1915, it is located on the border of Boise and Elmore counties, upstream of the Lucky Peak Dam and reservoir. The spillway elevation for Arrowrock is 3,219 feet (981 m) above sea level and its primary purpose is to provide irrigation water for agriculture.

The dam was designated as a National Historic Civil Engineering Landmark by the American Society of Civil Engineers in 2016, and is operated by the U.S. Bureau of Reclamation.

== Preparations ==
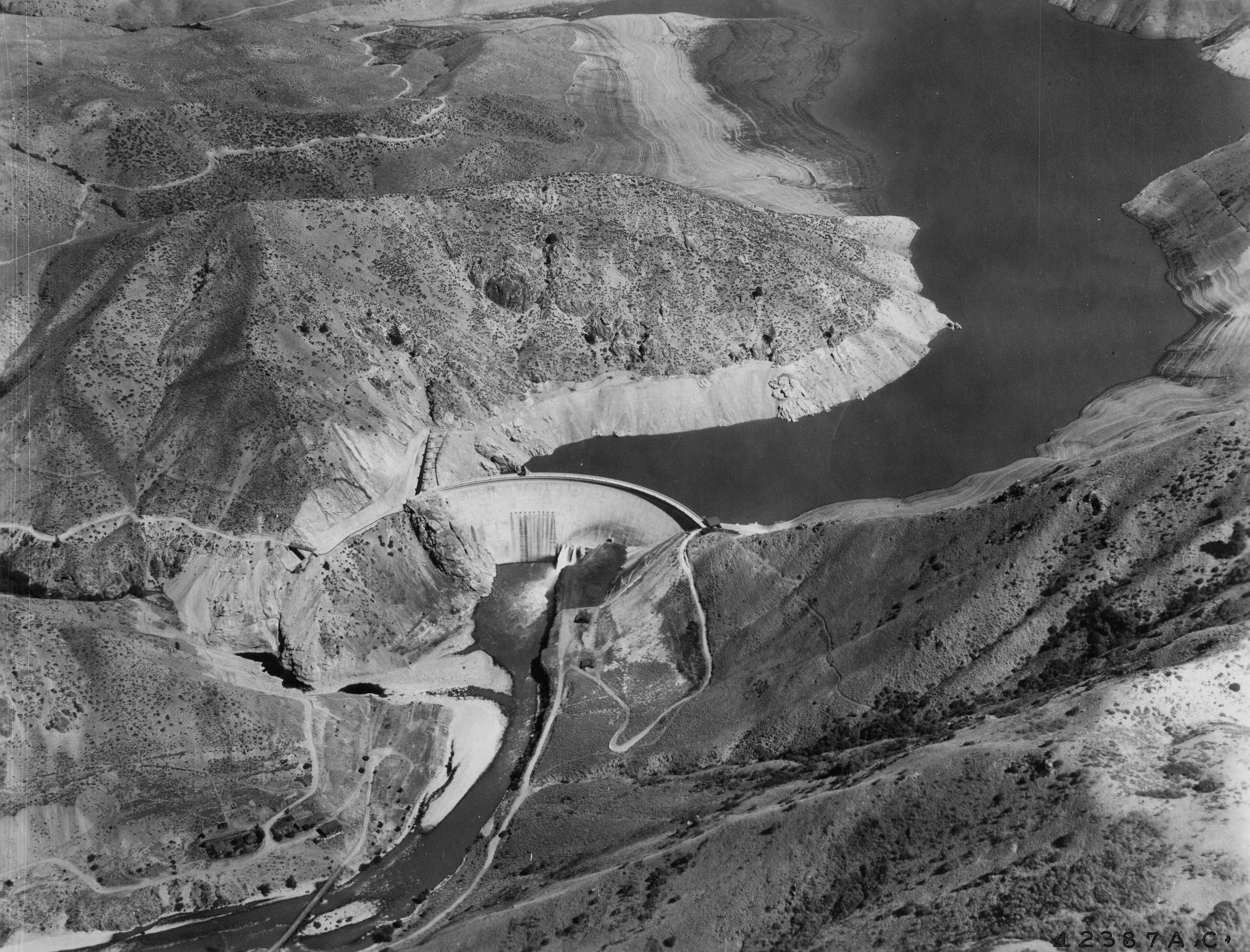
Arrowrock Dam, 1925

In 1910, the Reclamation Service began to consider another storage facility farther east on the Boise River. After several surveys, engineers decided upon the Arrowrock site which had previously been the site of a private irrigation venture under the direction of Arthur De Wint Foote yet failed for lack of funding. The Arrowrock site is at the confluence of the main channel and the south fork. That was to be the most ambitious project to date for Reclamation. At 348 feet (106 m), Arrowrock would be the largest concrete arch dam in the world. Prior to construction, considerable preparatory work would need to be completed. As the structure was some twenty miles (32 km) upstream from the Boise River Diversion Dam, routing supplies to the worksite would be a massive undertaking unto itself. The Reclamation Service elected to construct a new rail line on the old wagon road leading north to Idaho City. The railroad would begin at the Barberton mill near the Diversion Dam and extend to through a winding canyon up to Arrowrock. Even before the dam had been approved, Reclamation began work on the rail line.

Some significant problems existed with construction of the railroad. The Barberton Lumber Company owned the road's right-of-way. That meant that the Reclamation Service needed to come to an agreement over ownership of the rail line. In an unprecedented move, the government agreed to lease the track from Barberton but run the actual locomotive. Part of this agreement stipulated that the line would remain a common carrier. That made the Arrowrock & Boise Railroad the first publicly owned line in the nation. The Service hid this fact from President William Howard Taft when it applied for the Arrowrock Dam's approval. Fortunately for Reclamation, Taft failed to recognize the loophole and in June 1910, the entire project went forward. However, when the Oregon Shortline refused to honor the pact between Barberton and Reclamation, the Arrowrock & Boise terminal was reduced to a field just outside the Barber lumberyard. On August 22, 1910, the entire deal was finalized and work began on the line to the Arrowrock site.

Salt Lake City's Manly Brothers won the contract for grading the Arrowrock & Boise road in May 1911. The government called for force account to lay the track from Barber to the work site. Although the construction was delayed several times by the shortage of railroad ties, workers finished the track in early November. By most accounts, the trip through the canyon was a very long and harrowing event. For the first several months, riders were asked to disembark at the unfinished Gooseneck Bridge while the cars were winched across one at a time.

However, once they arrived, most passengers were surprised by what they found. Not only was the view breathtaking but the "work" camp offered amenities that were unavailable to some residents of the Treasure Valley. Not only was the site fully powered, but also it provided a central heating plant, running water and an efficient sewage system. Along with the Reclamation offices, the Arrowrock camp carried a hospital, mess hall, post office, and hotel. Workers and visitors were offered lodging in the site's hotel, bunkhouses, or cottages. In addition to the outdoor recreational activities, the camp also operated a YMCA, school, and dancehall. At the peak of construction, some 1,400 people had called Arrowrock home, including some 200 families.

To provide power for the site, Reclamation retrofitted The Boise River Diversion Dam with a small powerhouse. Finished in 1912, the plant's three generators produced 1,500 kilowatts of electricity for Arrowrock's camp, sawmills, and giant cement mixers. The German made Allis-Chalmers 725 horsepower (541 kW) turbines, the first in the world to be built with a vertical shaft design. Along with the power lines, government workers hung a two-way phone cable to connect Arrowrock with the outside world. In 1976, the power plant was added to the National Register of Historic Places. After being refurbished by the Bonneville Power Administration in 2002, it is now on ready reserve status and occasionally provides surplus power during times of peak demand. Special care was made to maintain the historic qualities of the powerhouse. The original governors, slate control panels, transformers, overhead crane, and generator housings, although no longer functional, were retained for historic purposes.

== Work commencement ==
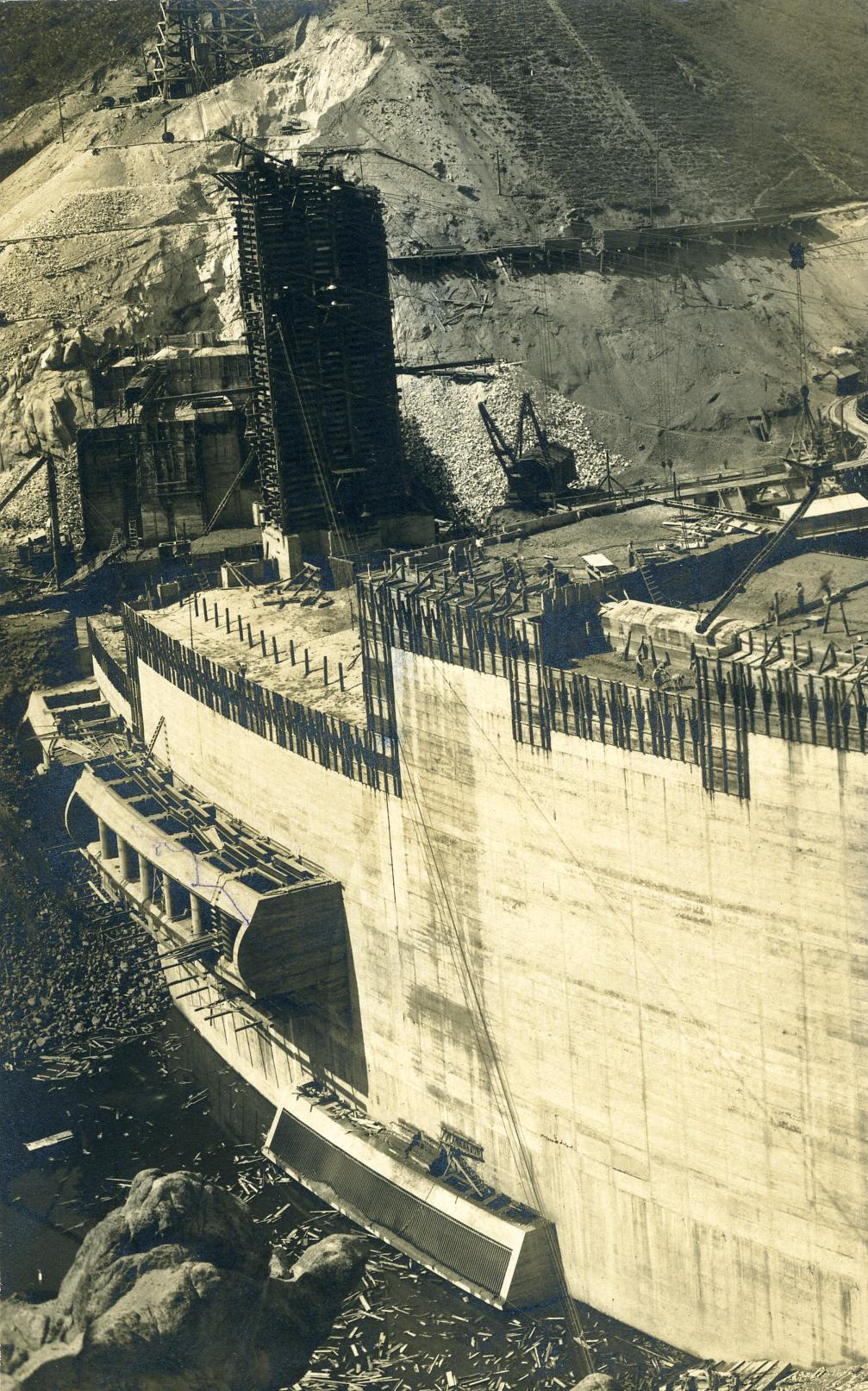
The dam under construction, 1914

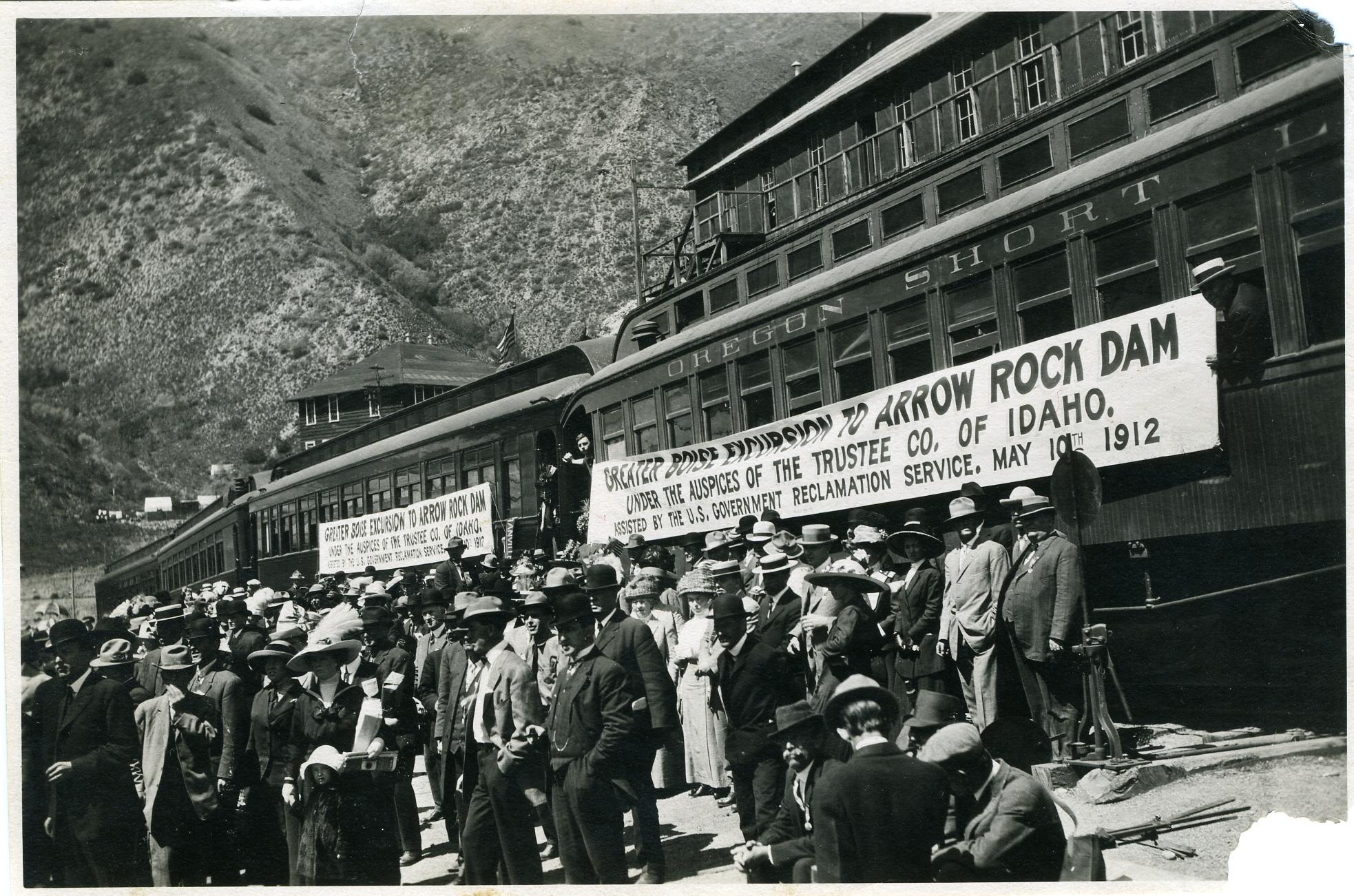
Arrowrock Dam tour from Boise on the Oregon Short Line Railroad

Work began on the Arrowrock Dam in early 1912 and moved along at a record-setting pace. As labor was becoming more plentiful with the completion of Deer Flat and the Diversion Dam, wage rates began to decrease. Common laborers were now offered $2.40 and day while skilled workers pulled in anywhere from $3.00 to $4.00. In addition, several deductions were made for room and board. Workers could choose between the dormitory style bunkhouses at $1.25 a month or a private room at $4.00. Seventy-five cents was deducted each day for meals and $1.00 a month went towards hospital costs. The work proved moderately dangerous and accounted for numerous injuries and twelve deaths. However, despite the hazards and reduction in pay, it appears there was a unique level of camaraderie at the Arrowrock site. As stated above, the workers set several construction records, not the least of which included the 527,300 cubic yards (403,100 m^{3}) of concrete laid on the dam.

The Reclamation Service spared no expense regarding the equipment at Arrowrock Dam. Along with the refurbished 70-ton Atlantic steam shovel from Deer Flat were two versatile 18-ton "dinkey" excavators and several brand new dump cars. The cement mixers produced over 2,000 barrels per day and ran uninterrupted for almost 30 months. Two 12-ton Lidgerwood cableways hovered over the site and moved material and concrete from their loading grounds to the dam site. Scores of horse teams helped carry equipment and gravel from the camp to the various work areas. Additionally, one Buick and seven Ford trucks serviced both crews and visitors and provided an unexpected level of mobility throughout the campsite. In an effort to alleviate some of the discomfort along the Boise & Arrowrock, Reclamation purchased a 60-ton locomotive and several new passenger cars. For almost five years, the train ran faithfully through the canyon, delivering over 89,500 visitors and crewmen. Also, during its commission, the Boise & Arrowrock traveled more than 110,000 miles (180,000 km) and carried 14,000,000 tons of freight.

Work underway at Arrowrock Dam spillway, 1914

== Dedication ==
On October 4, 1915, the Arrowrock Dam was finally dedicated. As stated above, it was the tallest dam in the world for nine years, until the completion of the Schräh dam in Switzerland in 1924, with a height of 366 feet (111.6 m). In addition, engineers pioneered the use of dam instrumentation with the placement of ten thermometers embedded deep within the structure's concrete. Along with innovative contraction joints, the Reclamation Service was able to control the temperature of the setting concrete, ensuring the dams strength. It is 225 feet (69 m) thick at the base and 15 feet (4.6 m) thick at the crest. It is serviced by 25 outlets some of which are designed to regulate themselves, another first in engineering. Ten outlets were built for an eventual power plant, but they have yet to be used.

In total, the dam contains 585,160 cubic yards (447,390 m^{3}) of concrete and the reservoir holds over 286,000 acre-feet (353,000,000 m^{3}) of irrigation water. Within the first week of operation, an estimated 12,000 visitors braved the canyon ride to see the dam. However, as interest waned, the Arrowrock & Boise Railroad schedule dropped significantly. The campsite, once a bustling hive of activity, was quickly becoming a ghost town. On August 11, 1916, the government decommissioned its very first public carrier.

== Later work ==
From 1935 to 1937, construction at Arrowrock raised the dam five feet (1.5 m), increasing its capacity by 9,000 acre-feet (11,100,000 m^{3}), and replaced deteriorating concrete on the dam's downstream face and spillway channel.

From 2001 to 2004, ten aging Ensign valves were removed and replaced with clamshell gates. By 2011, work was completed to permanently plug all five sluice gate outlets.

A 15-MW powerplant was added to Arrowrock Dam in March 2010, and the transmission line to the dam was updated.

== See also ==
- List of dams and reservoirs in Idaho - 4th largest in Idaho
- List of lakes in Idaho
- List of dams and reservoirs
