= Deer Flat Upper Embankment =

Dam in Idaho, United States

Coordinates: 43°33′37″N 116°39′12″W

- Interactive map of Deer Flat Upper Embankment
- Country: United States
- Location: Treasure Valley
- Purpose: Irrigation
- Status: Operational
- Construction began: 1906
- Opening date: 1908
- Built by: United States Reclamation Service
- Owner: Snake River Area Office
- Operator: Boise Project Board of Control

Dam and spillways
- Type of dam: Earth fill dam
- Impounds: Boise River
- Height (foundation): 74 feet (23 m)
- Length: 4,165 feet (1,269 m)
- Elevation at crest: 2,538 feet (774 m)

Reservoir
- Creates: Lake Lowell
- Total capacity: 169,000 acre-feet (208,000,000 m^{3})
- Surface area: 16 square miles (41 km^{2})
- Normal elevation: 2,520 feet (770 m)

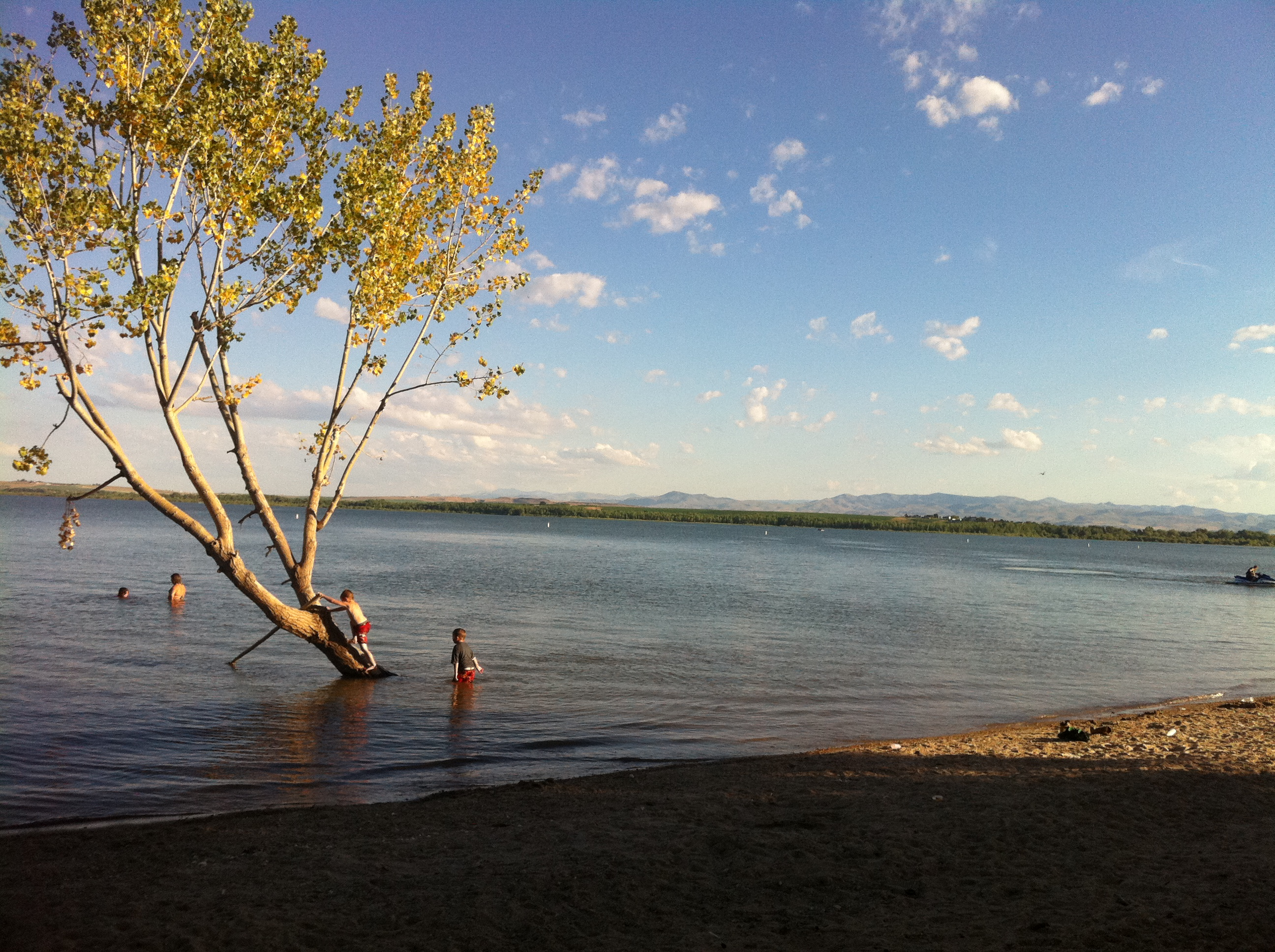
Lower Dam Recreation Area, north Lake Lowell

Deer Flat Upper Embankment (National ID # ID00276) is a dam in the western United States in southwestern Idaho. Located in the Treasure Valley in Canyon County, it is directly southwest of Nampa.

The earthen dam was completed 118 years ago in 1908 by the Reclamation Service (now U.S. Bureau of Reclamation), with a height of 74 feet (23 m) and a crest length of 4,165 feet (1.27 km). The Upper Embankment is the largest of a set of four dikes here impounding the water of the Boise River in offstream storage. The other dams are:

- Deer Flat Middle Dike (ID #ID00277), completed 1911, 18 feet (5.5 m) high, 1,262 feet (385 m) long
- Deer Flat Lower Dike (ID #ID00278), completed 1908, 48 feet (15 m) high, 7,270 feet (2,220 m) long
- Deer Flat East Dike (ID #ID82902), completed 1911, 18 feet (5.5 m) high, 3,806 feet (1,160 m) long

The reservoir it creates, Lake Lowell, has a normal surface area of 16 square miles (41 km^{2}), and a maximum capacity of 169,000 acre-feet (208,000,000 m^{3}). Its surface elevation is approximately 2,520 feet (770 m) above sea level.

The Boise Project was among the first undertaken by the Reclamation Service after its formation in 1902. Shortly before leaving office, President Theodore Roosevelt created a national bird refuge at Deer Flat Reservoir, now Lake Lowell, with an executive order on February 25, 1909. The refuge was one of 17 federal reclamation projects referenced in the order, each of which used manmade aquifers to provide safe havens for migratory birds. The effort to include the Canyon County site was spearheaded by James H. Lowell, the president of the local Payette-Boise Water Users Association.

The "globally important" Deer Flat National Wildlife Refuge for migratory fowl and other wildlife consists of two sections which contains open water, edge wetlands, grasslands and riparian and forest habitats. The largest portion of the refuge consists of Lake Lowell and its environs. The second portion comprises the Snake River islands located in non-contiguous localities along the river in Canyon, Owyhee, Payette, and Washington counties (Idaho) and Malheur and Baker counties (Oregon). The visitors' center on the northern Lake Lowell shoreline is the hub of activity for visitors and those volunteers who donate their time and services to wildlife conservation projects.

== See also ==
- New York Canal
