= Deer Flat National Wildlife Refuge =

Breeding area for mammals, birds, and other animals

- IUCN category IV (habitat/species management area)
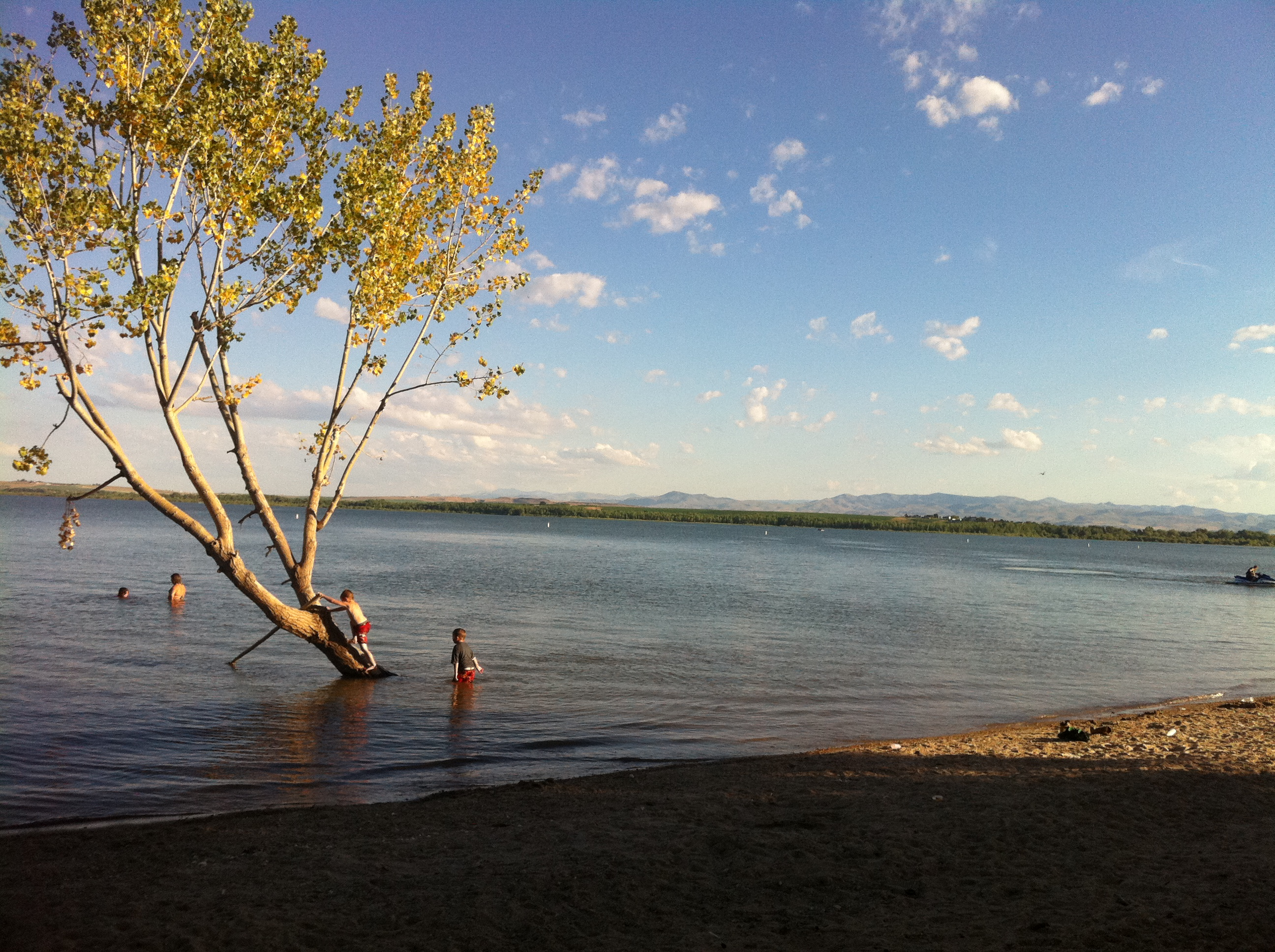
- The Lower Dam Recreation Area in summer

- Location within the United States
- Location: Southwestern Idaho and eastern Oregon, United States
- Nearest city: Nampa, Idaho
- Coordinates: 43°33′N 116°40′W
- Area: 10,548 acres (16.481 sq mi; 42.69 km^{2})
- Established: February 25, 1909
- Governing body: U.S. Fish and Wildlife Service
- Website: Deer Flat NWR

The Deer Flat National Wildlife Refuge is an important breeding area for mammals, birds, and other animals. The National Wildlife Refuge is located on land surrounding Lake Lowell, just outside Nampa, Idaho. It serves as a resting and wintering area for birds, including mallards and Canada geese, along the Pacific Flyway and was named a "Globally Important Bird Area" by the American Bird Conservancy.

The refuge consists of two sections which contains open water, edge wetlands, grasslands and riparian and forest habitats. The largest portion of the refuge consists of Lake Lowell and its environs, located in Canyon County, just west of Nampa, while the second comprises the Snake River islands located in non-contiguous localities along the river in Canyon, Owyhee, Payette, and Washington counties (Idaho) and Malheur and Baker counties (Oregon).

There is a visitor center at the Lake Lowell site, which is the hub of activity for visitors and those volunteers who donate their time and services to wildlife conservation projects.

== Wildlife and Habitat ==
Wildlife has dynamic and unique needs that require a variety of habitats for food, shelter, and raising young. Deer Flat National Wildlife Refuge is managed to improve and maintain wildlife habitat. Habitats at Deer Flat include wetlands, riparian forests, uplands, and croplands at the Lake Lowell sector, as well as the 101 Snake River Islands.

=== History ===
President Theodore Roosevelt created a national bird refuge at Deer Flat Reservoir, now Lake Lowell, with his February 25, 1909, executive order. The refuge was one of 17 federal reclamation projects referenced in the order, each of which used manmade aquifers to provide safe havens for migratory birds. The effort to include the Canyon County site was spearheaded by James H. Lowell, then-president of the Payette-Boise Water Users Association.

- 1902 Reclamation Act authorizes establishment of U.S. Reclamation Service, now the Bureau of Reclamation, to irrigate western lands. Survey for location of Deer Flat Reservoir conducted.
- 1905 James H. Lowell, begins securing contracts to purchase the lands that would become the Deer Flat Reservoir, now Lake Lowell.
- 1906 Work begins on the upper and lower embankments.
- 1907 Caldwell Interurban Railroad begins public route to Lower Dam
- 1908 Lower Embankment completed in January. Equalization trench in Deer Flat Reservoir excavated with steam shovel No. 1 from Upper Embankment. Earthwork at Upper Embankment completed.
- 1909 Outlet channel at Lower Embankment completed and water turned in to Lake Lowell from New York canal. Roosevelt signs Executive Order 1032 on February 25.
- 1913 Sebree Dance Pavilion completed at Lower Dam Recreation Area.
- 1926 Nampa-Meridian Irrigation District signs agreement with federal government stipulating that Board of Control is now in charge of the project.
- 1928 Sebree Dance Pavilion dismantled and moved to Caldwell.
- 1930 First Lake Lowell Boat Races held at Upper Dam.
- 1935 Civilian Conservation Corps BR-24 Co. 2506 charged with restoring dams eroded by waves and ice.
- 1937 President Franklin D. Roosevelt creates the Snake River Islands Refuge by executive order. Thomas Horn assigned as first refuge manager.
- 1938 Works Progress Administration workers help build refuge infrastructure (roads and buildings).
- 1939 WPA workers complete observation tower.
- 1943 Youth Aid Farm Camp for girls housed in Civilian Conservation Corps barracks at Lower Dam.
- 1948 Deer Flat Reservoir renamed Lake Lowell in honor of J.H. Lowell.
- 1957 Special-use permit issued to Canyon County for sanitary landfill on refuge property.
- 1963 Snake River Islands Refuge consolidated with Deer Flat National Wildlife Refuge.
- 1967 Last of CCC barracks removed from Lower Dam Recreation Area.
- 1970 Environmental Education building constructed at the Lower Dam.
- 1971 Landfill closed. Marsing Job Corps starts construction of Visitor Center.
- 1975 Visitor Center completed and First Youth Conservation Corps formed.
- 1976 Bureau of Reclamation nominates embankments to National Register of Historic Places.
- 1979 Special-use permit issued to Clint Eastwood to film part of Bronco Billy at Upper Embankment.
- 2006 Friends of Deer Flat Wildlife Refuge formed.
- 2009 Centennial Trail installed across historic upper dam.
