= Walter Lubken =

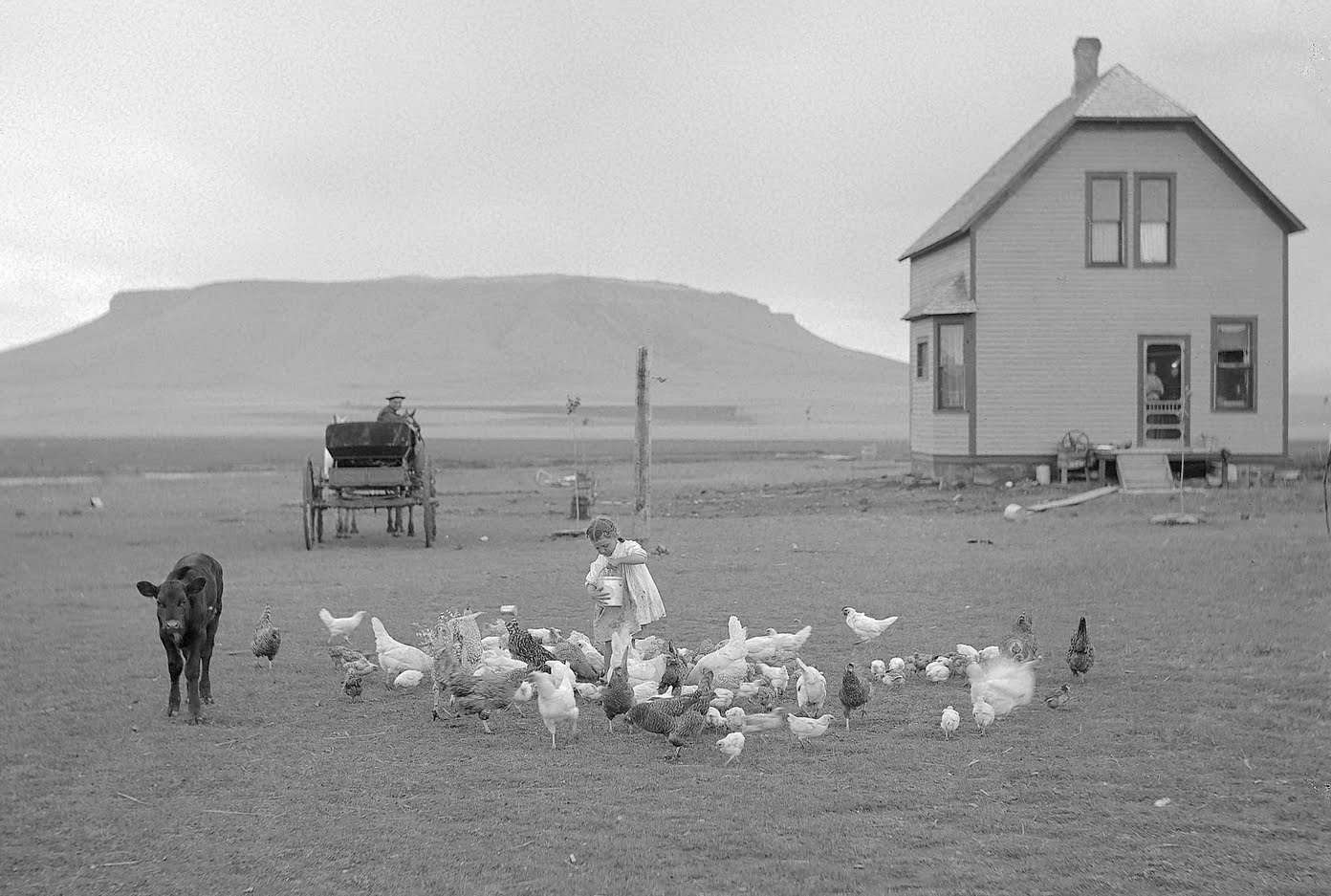
An example of a Lubken photo demonstrating the human side of the Federal irrigation effort, the Hancock homestead, July 23, 1910, before the Sun River project, Montana.

Walter J. Lubken (1882–1960) was an American photographer, and the official photographer for the United States Reclamation Service (USRS) from 1903 to 1917. During these years, Lubken took thousands of photographs documenting the Reclamation Service's irrigation projects across the American West. He recorded the progress of construction projects as well as USRS machinery and personnel. The agency also asked Lubken to photograph nearby towns and farms for a series of articles designed to promote settlement on land reclaimed from the desert through irrigation.

Traveling with his large camera and glass-plate negatives, he documented 25 projects in 17 Western States. After leaving the Reclamation Service in 1917, Lubken left professional photography until the 1930s, when he photographed the building of Boulder Dam.

Lubken's photographs capture both engineering feats and everyday life in the early 20th-century West. His images capture the technological and social advances made by Westerners, and convey that opportunity lie in the wake of the Federal projects providing irrigation water, flood control, and power to isolated, formerly barren lands.

== Biography ==
Walter was born Walter John Lubken, the fourth of six children on 24 August 1882 in Boise, Idaho, to George Lubken, a German baker from New York City, and Hellena Aldelmann. He married Alice Cornelia (Hoagland) Hall, a divorcee, the daughter of John Aaron Hoagland (1861–1929) and Harriet Maria Louditt Rupp (1862–1949), of LDS Church fame, on 4 December 1911 in Boise, Ada County, Idaho. They had no children, but Walter did assist in the raising of Alice's only child by her former marriage to Alva Archer Hall (1877–1942).

After photography, Walter went back to a former career working as a dry goods store clerk, which occupation he apparently was more proud of than his time as a government Photographer, and died quietly in his home town of Boise some time in June 1960 at the age of 77 according to the 1 July 1960 Associated Press.
