= Treasure Valley =

Metropolitan area and river valley in southwestern Idaho

Coordinates: 44°02′25″N 116°56′00″W

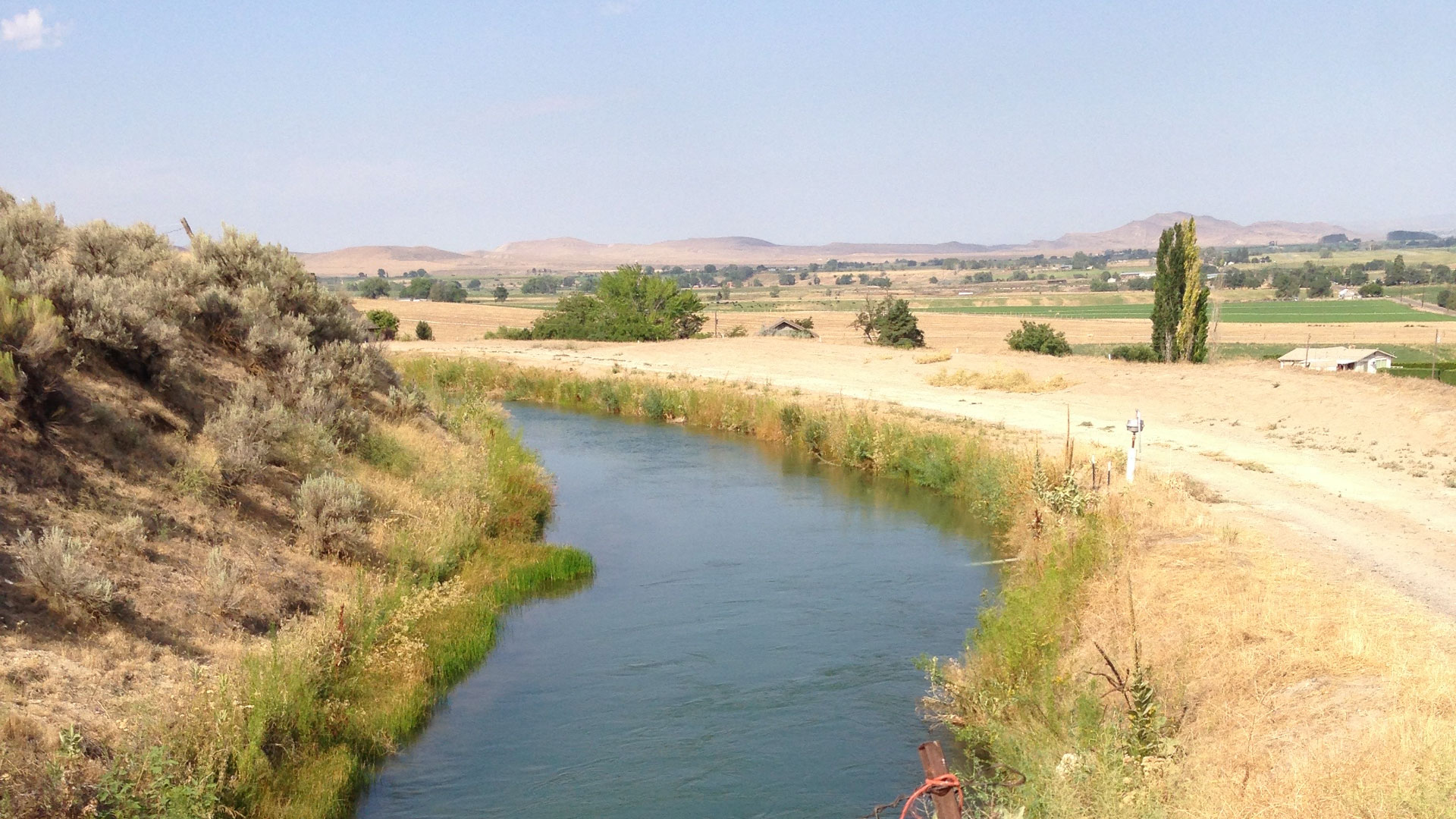
Canal in Treasure Valley

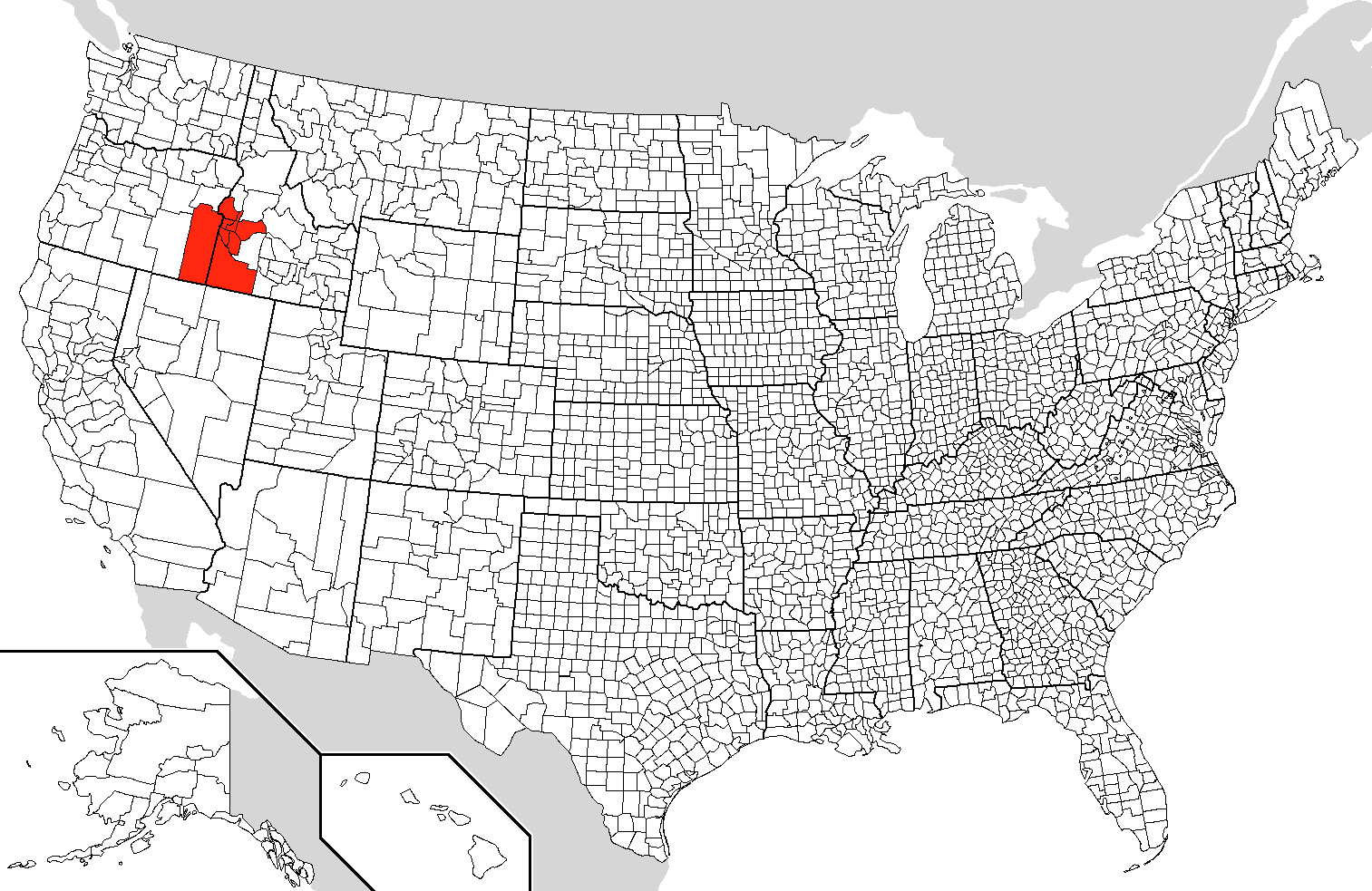
Location of Treasure Valley in the United States

The Treasure Valley is a valley in the western United States, primarily in southwestern Idaho, where the Payette, Boise, Weiser, Malheur, and Owyhee rivers drain into the Snake River. It includes all the lowland areas from Vale in rural eastern Oregon to Boise, and is the most populated area in Idaho.

Historically, the valley had been known as the Lower Snake River Valley or the Boise River Valley. Pete Olesen, president of the valley's association of local Chambers of Commerce, coined the name "Treasure Valley" in 1959 to reflect the treasure chest of resources and opportunities that the region offered. The valley has a very diverse terrain, from sage flatlands, to mesas, agricultural areas, and urbanized areas. As the Boise Metropolitan Area grows, more and more undeveloped and agricultural land is being urbanized.

== History ==
=== Settling the region ===
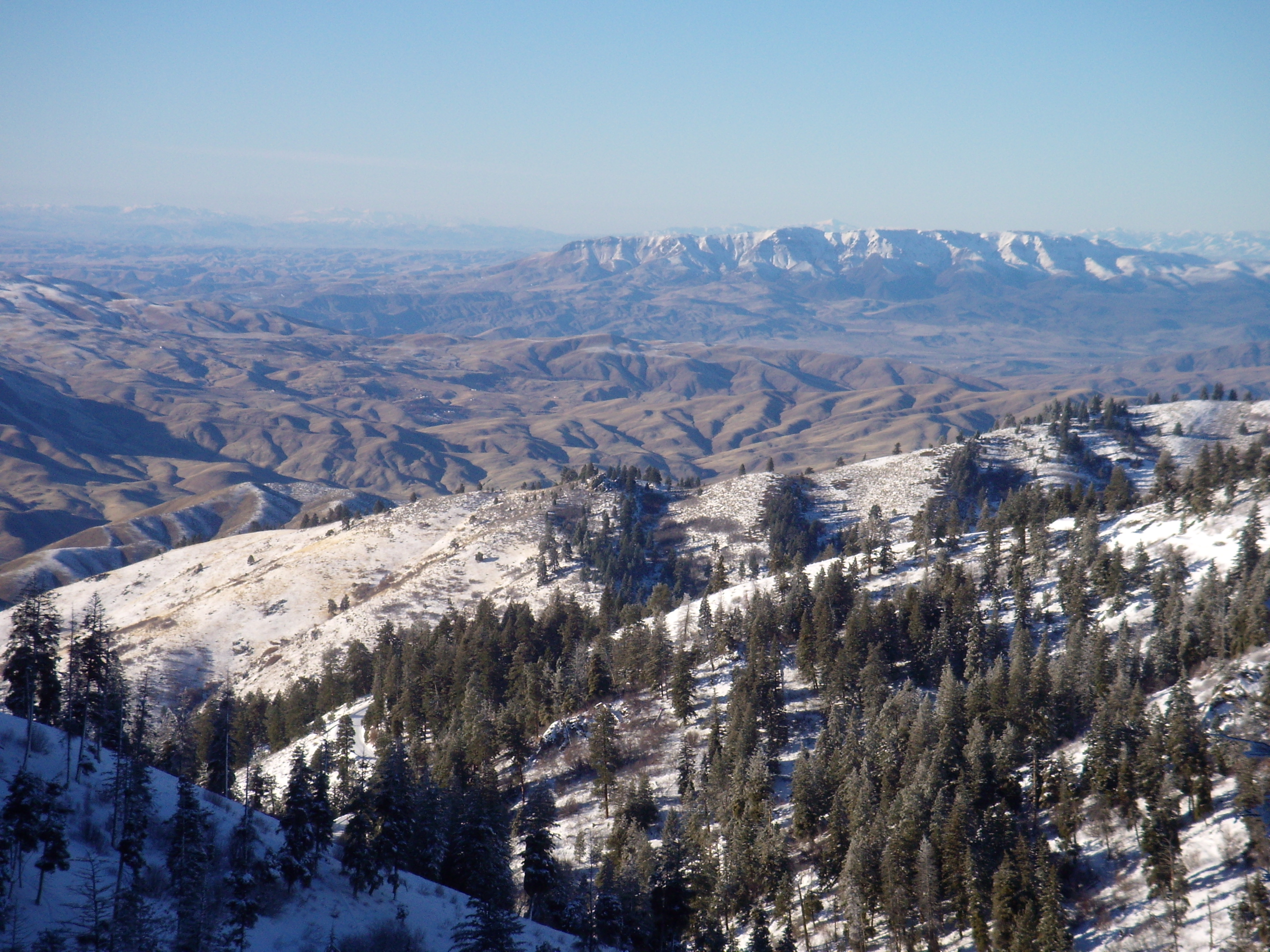
The Treasure Valley from the east side of Bogus Basin

The tribes that roamed the area, specifically, were the Northern Paiute and Shoshone. In 1834, Thomas McKay built the original Fort Boise, in the area near present-day Parma, which was run for a time by Francois Payette. It later was moved because of flooding troubles and was abandoned in 1854. The Oregon Trail runs through the Treasure Valley.

The valley was settled for the most part by ranchers and farmers, initially to supply the gold and silver mining communities in the higher elevations nearby: Idaho City in the Boise Basin and Silver City in the Owyhees. A new Fort Boise was constructed by the U.S. Army in 1863 in present-day Boise, from which the city grew. In 1883, the Oregon Short Line Railroad reached the Treasure Valley, creating a thriving community, with Nampa as the center of the area's rail activity.

=== Basque immigration ===
Many Basques, primarily from northern Spain, came to the area looking for gold but, meeting discrimination, it seemed to many that a better occupation was shepherding, familiar from their homeland. Over 15,000 Basques came to the Treasure Valley, making it the largest community of Basques outside of Europe.

=== Farming ===
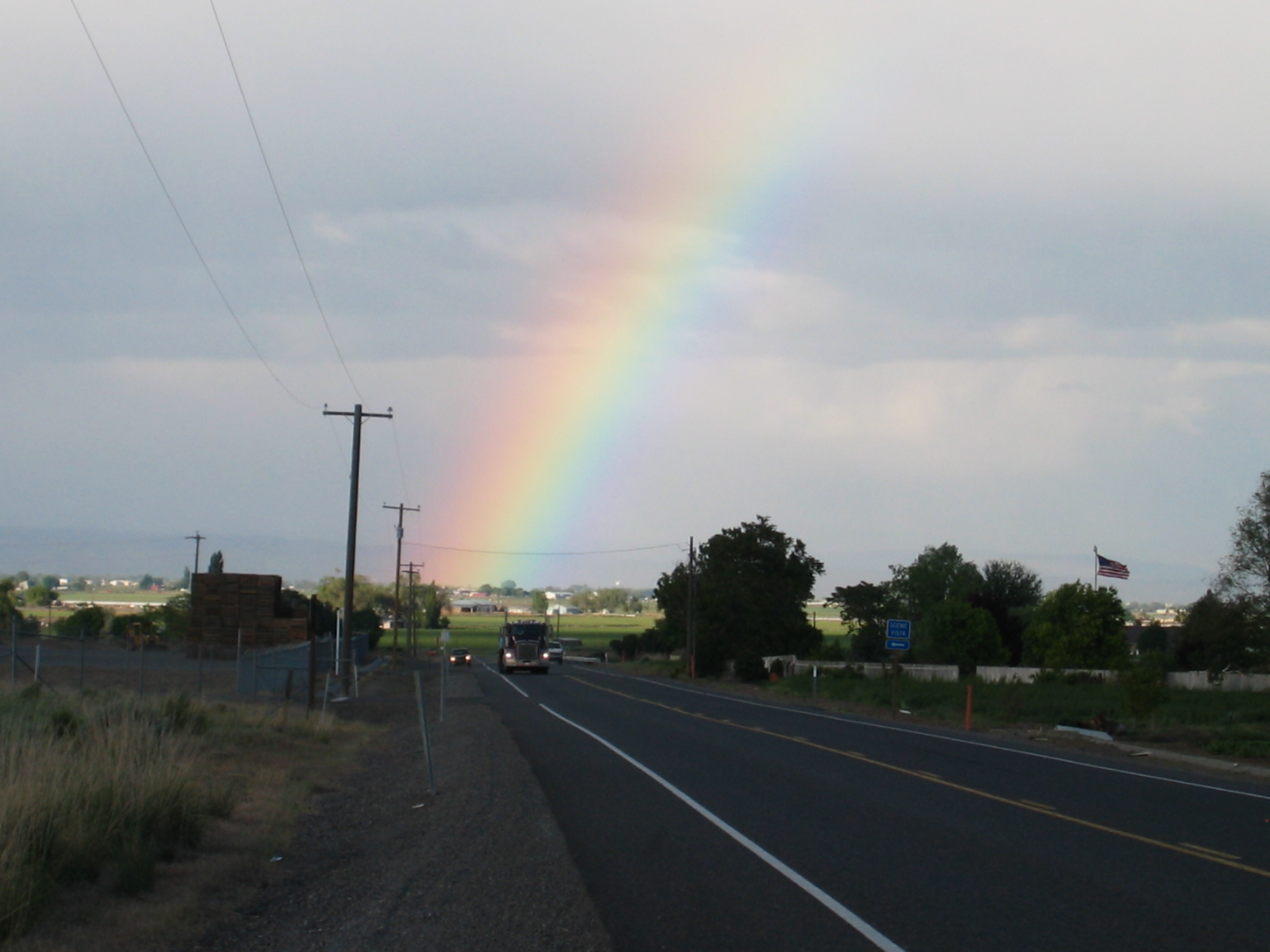
Eastbound from Vale on US-20/26 into Ontario, Oregon.

As Boise began to grow, so did the riches of large planters such as Thomas and Frank Davis. They moved to Idaho in 1862 for mining and homesteaded right below the Boise Bench on the Boise River. Tom Davis became very successful at growing fruit, as he made over $10,000 on one year's apple crop. He later purchased more land for orchards and horses. In 1907, he donated much of this land as Julia Davis Park in honor of his wife.

The Owyhee Project was one of the most influential developments of the area. It began 123 years ago in 1903, when surveyors began investigating a site on the Owyhee River for the construction of a dam, to impound water for irrigation. The Owyhee project received official Congressional sanction in 1924 on December 5 and the Owyhee Dam was completed on September 16, 1932. While the dam was under construction, over 98.5 miles (159 km) of irrigation canals were being dug to the north and south. The main purpose of the Owyhee Project was irrigation. By 1965, over 111,000 acres (450 km^{2}) were being irrigated for a value of more than $23 million.

In 1941, J. R. Simplot built a dehydrator and began processing large quantities of dehydrated potatoes and onions at a plant near Caldwell. His business thrived, selling potatoes to the government and fertilizer to local farmers.

=== Technology ===
In 1973, Hewlett-Packard purchased a 150-acre (60 ha) site for a future peripherals plant in northwest Boise. Micron Technology was founded in 1978, creating an additional, local industry aside from farming and potato packaging. In September 2022, Micron announced plans to invest approximately $15 billion through the end of the decade to construct a new leading-edge memory manufacturing fabrication plant in Boise, the first new memory fab built in the United States in 20 years and the largest private investment in Idaho’s history. The investment, made possible in part by the CHIPS and Science Act, is expected to create approximately 2,000 direct Micron jobs and over 17,000 indirect jobs.

== Geographic features ==
- Lucky Peak Lake
- Shafer Butte
- Table Rock

== See also ==
- Magic Valley
- Sun Valley
- Central Idaho
