= Southwestern Idaho =

Coordinates: 43°30′N 116°30′W

- Region
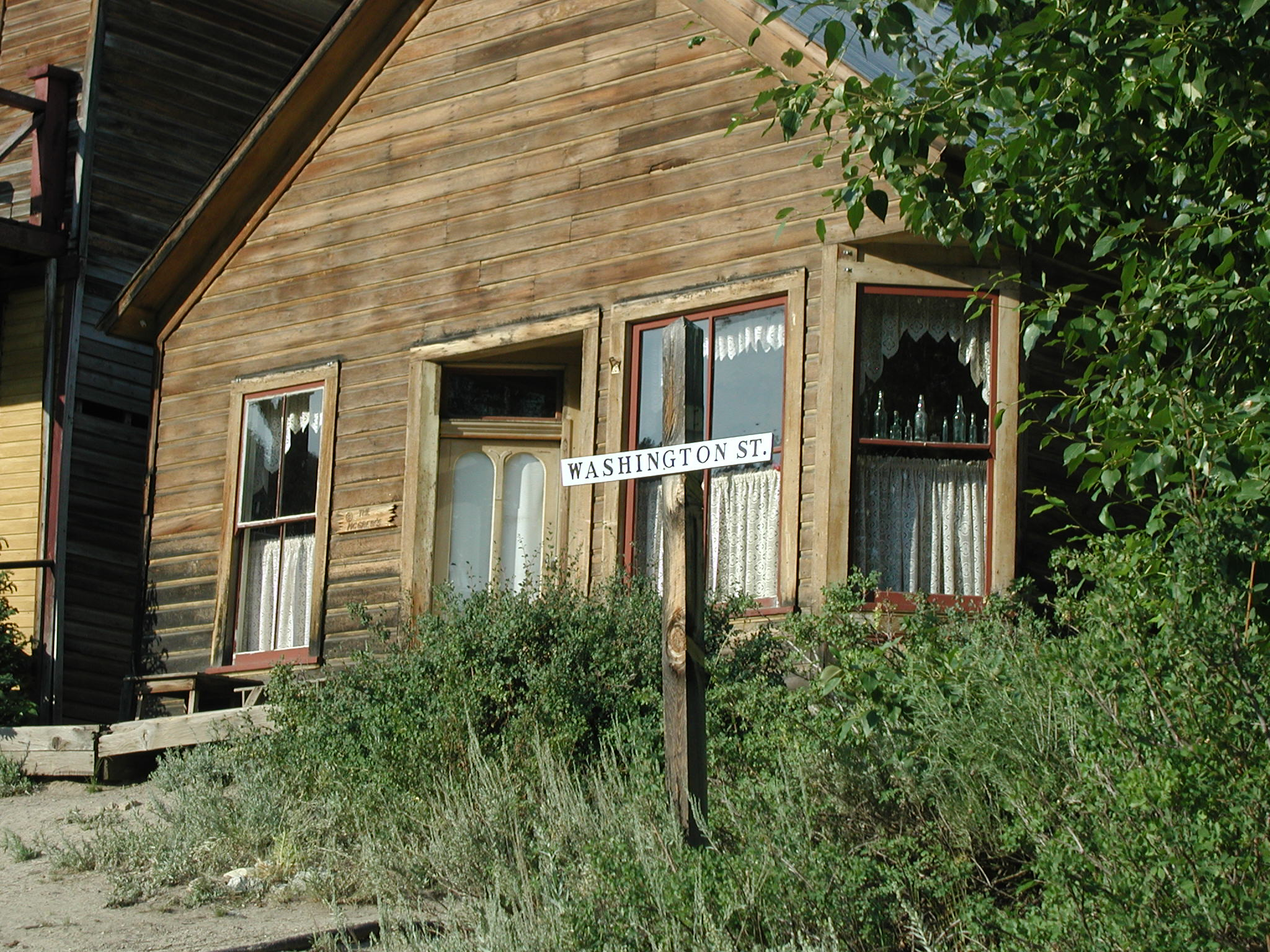
- A historic building in Silver City, a ghost town located in Southwestern Idaho.

- Map of counties included in Southwestern Idaho (highlighted in red).
- Country: United States
- State: Idaho
- Largest city: Boise (pop.: 235,684)

Area
  - Total: 21,728.5 sq mi (56,277 km^{2})

Population (2020)
  - Total: 845,395
  - Density: 38.9/sq mi (15.0/km^{2})
- Time zone: UTC−7 (Mountain)
  - Summer (DST): UTC−6 (MDT)
- Area codes: 208, 986

Southwestern Idaho is a geographical term for the area along the U.S. state of Idaho's borders with Oregon and Nevada. It includes the populous areas of the Boise metropolitan area and the Treasure Valley.

The counties of Ada, Adams, Boise, Canyon, Elmore, Gem, Owyhee, Payette, Valley, and Washington are included in the region.

== Demographics ==
In the 2020 Census, the ten county area had a combined population of 845,395 people; 45.9% of the state's population. Ada and Canyon are the two most populous counties in Idaho, and both have (respectively) experienced a 36.6% and 31.2% growth in population since 2010, making them among the fastest growing counties in terms of population in the state.

The largest city in Southwestern Idaho, and in the state, is Boise, with a population of 235,684. Other major cities include Meridian, Nampa, Caldwell, Fruitland, Weiser, Homedale, McCall, and Emmett.

== History ==
Southwestern Idaho was originally inhabited by three main Native American tribes: the Shoshone-Bannock, the Nez Perce, and the Northern Paiute. These people were among the first inhabitants in Idaho, first living in the area as early as 12,000 years ago. The Native Americans tribes were nomadic, adopting a hunter-gatherer lifestyle, and had an annual rendezvous in the Boise Valley, which also included catching salmon.

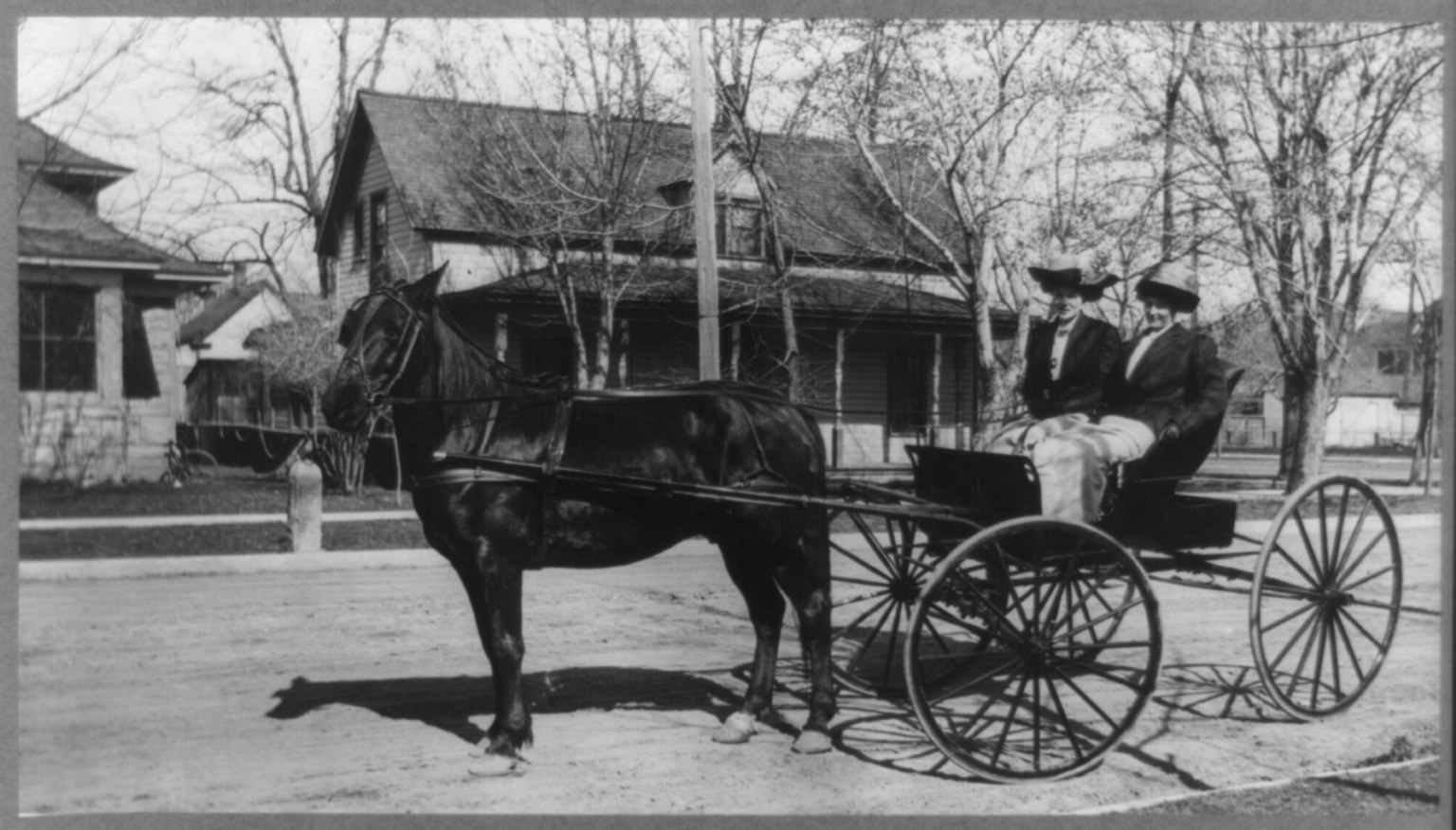
Women riding in a rig in Boise, Idaho, 1910.

Spanish explorers in the late 1500s explored parts of the American West, including southwestern Idaho, and introduced the Native Americans of the area to pigs, horses, domestic fowl, corn, tomatoes, and garlic. After the Lewis and Clark Expedition through Idaho, French-Canadian fur trappers further explored the area. Mountain men, including Spaniards and Mexicans, lived off the land in Southwestern Idaho, trading with the Native Americans in the area. However, it wasn't until further development in Oregon, the mass exodus of settlers to the West on the Oregon, Californian, and Mormon trails, the establishment of Fort Boise, and the Idaho Gold Rush in the 1850s and 60s that settling of Southwestern Idaho began to increase. In order to support mining towns, such as Idaho City, Booneville, Ruby City, and Silver City, numerous ranching and agriculture businesses were set up in the area. One of the biggest ranching operations in 1869 was in Owyhee County, where an original 1,400 head of cattle was driven around the county, forging the area's cattle industry that persists today. At an unknown time, there were an estimated 100,000 head of cattle in the area of Owyhee.

This piece of country is worth looking after. The lakes and streams abound with fish at this time of the year and the game is plentiful…. The Payette Lake, a beautiful sheet of water 12 miles long, in places is dotted with richly wooded inlets set like emerald gems on the bosom of the liquid mirror.

— N.B. Willey, Warren Times, 1874.

Meanwhile, communities in the forests and mountains of Southwestern Idaho began to grow. N. B. Willey, future governor of Idaho, wrote to the Warren Times, creating interest in the area around Payette Lake, the future site of McCall. In a few years, commercial fisheries would come to operation on Payette Lake, selling fresh, salted, and dried Chinook salmon and white fish to the areas in the Boise Valley. Over time, infrastructure, including a hotel, the Meadow-to-Warren Trail (now Idaho State Highway 55), and a post office led to the southern shore of Payette Lake to become the center of mining, recreation, forestry, and agriculture for the McCall area. Over the next 20 years, expansion would continue with commercial camps, more hotels, private clubs, church camps, and scenic tours.

During this time period, the Native American tribes that had inhabited Southwestern Idaho were forced onto reservations in the 1870s, with the Nez Perce War being a key conflict during this time period. By 1877, all tribes native to Southwestern Idaho were located on reservations.

Rapid and exponential growth was relatively contained by the limits of agriculture and irrigation over the next half century, as Southwestern Idaho has an arid climate that makes long-term, practical farming difficult. Numerous small-scale, private companies aimed to establish irrigation in the lands outside of the easily watered lands near the Boise Valley, but were often disorganized, and had difficulty upscaling to larger areas. As such, the Casey Act, passed in 1894, allowed for the reclamation states with public lands to sell 160-acre plots of lands to farmers, which would then have irrigation districts approved by the state's office of reclamation engineering to bring irrigation to those pieces of acreage; a notable example is the Pioneer Irrigation District, established by 1900 near Caldwell and the surrounding areas (such as Notus and Middleton).

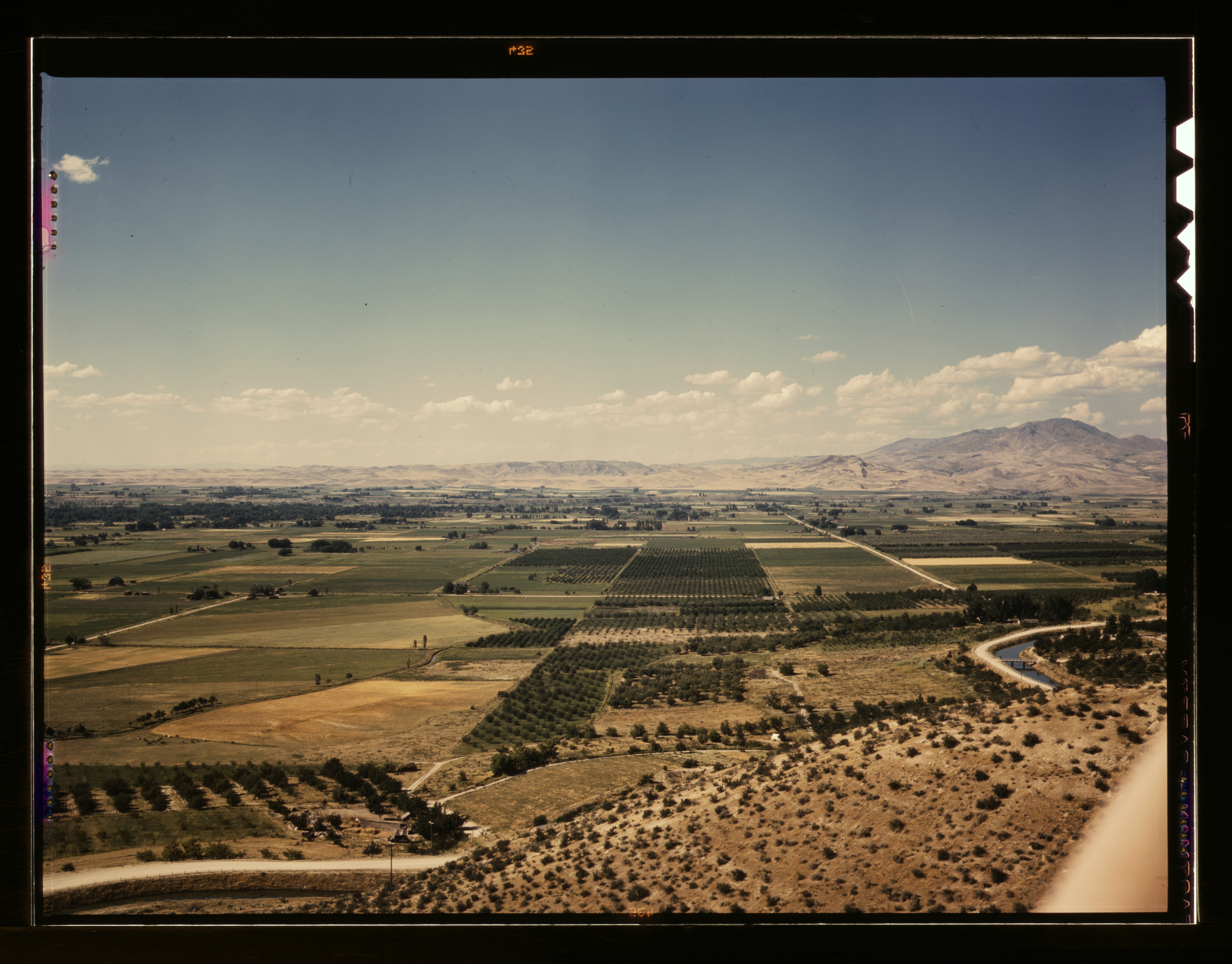
Cherry orchards, farm land, and irrigation located in Emmett, Idaho. This photo was taken in July 1941.

Idaho benefitted the most from the Casey Act, with around 60% of all land utilized by the Casey Act was located in Idaho, including Southwestern Idaho. In the early 1900s, reclamation projects, such as Arrowrock Dam, the New York Canal, the Cascade Dam, and the Anderson Ranch Dam all helped irrigate and make the area more sustainable and liveable. These projects, coupled alongside the underground pumping of water (started in 1950) continue to supply Southwestern Idaho with its necessary water supply.

In recent history, three cities in Southwestern Idaho were among the fastest growing in the country: Meridian, Nampa, and Caldwell all experienced population growths greater than or equal to 5% from July 2020 to July 2021. For context, Idaho is one of the fastest growing states in the United States; in 2022, census officials estimated that Idaho's population had grown by 1.8% from July 2021 to July 2022, making it the second-fastest growing state in the country.

Today, Southwestern Idaho is Idaho's primary and most well-known metropolitan area, with numerous industries, with the largest (by average employees) being education and health services; trade, transportation, and utilities; professional and business services; leisure and hospitality; and construction.

== Education ==
=== Public education ===
In Southwestern Idaho, K-12 schools are often ran by school district models, including the Boise School District and Meridian School Districts. These aforementioned school districts had the highest amount of funding and reserve funds in the state for the 2020-21 school year, with the Meridian School District having over $376.5 million, and the Boise School District having over $322.7 million. Each district harbors a third of this funding in reserves.

=== Colleges and Universities ===
The Idaho State Department of Commerce recognizes the following higher education facilities in Southwestern Idaho:

- Boise State University
- College of Western Idaho
- Northwest Nazarene University
- The College of Idaho

There are also numerous extension sites in Southwestern Idaho for Idaho State University, University of Idaho, and Tresure Valley Community College. There are also other higher education facilities not listed on the Idaho State Department of Commerce's website, including Boise Bible College, Idaho Baptist College, and Northwest Lineman College.

== Cities and towns ==
- Atlanta
- Boise
- Bruneau
- Caldwell
- Cambridge
- Cascade
- Council
- Donnelly
- Eagle
- Emmett
- Fruitland
- Garden Valley
- Glenns Ferry
- Grand View
- Greenleaf
- Homedale
- Horseshoe Bend
- Idaho City
- Kuna
- Lowman
- Marsing
- McCall
- Melba
- Meridian
- Middleton
- Midvale
- Mountain Home
- Murphy
- Nampa
- New Meadows
- New Plymouth
- Notus
- Parma
- Payette
- Silver City
- Star
- Weiser
- Wilder
- Yellow Pine
