= National Register of Historic Places listings in Elmore County, Idaho =

Location of Elmore County in Idaho

This is a list of the National Register of Historic Places listings in Elmore County, Idaho.

This is intended to be a complete list of the properties and districts on the National Register of Historic Places in Elmore County, Idaho, United States. Latitude and longitude coordinates are provided for many National Register properties and districts; these locations may be seen together in a map.

There are 25 properties and districts listed on the National Register in the county, one of which is also a National Historic Landmark. More may be added; properties and districts nationwide are added to the Register weekly.

This National Park Service list is complete through NPS recent listings posted November 21, 2025.

== Current listings ==
	Name on the Register	Image	Date listed	Location	City or town	Description
1	F. P. Ake Building	F. P. Ake Building	November 17, 1982 (#82000337)	160–172 N. Main St. 43°07′52″N 115°41′40″W	Mountain Home	
2	Amstutz Apartments	Amstutz Apartments	September 23, 1982 (#82002511)	320 S. Ada St. 42°57′01″N 115°17′59″W	Glenns Ferry	
3	Pedro Anchustegui Pelota Court	Pedro Anchustegui Pelota Court	January 30, 1978 (#78001060)	W. 2nd North St. 43°07′49″N 115°41′50″W	Mountain Home	
4	Atlanta Dam and Power Plant		October 5, 1977 (#77000459)	West of Atlanta on the Boise River; 43°48′12″N 115°09′48″W	Atlanta	
5	Atlanta Historic District		April 6, 1978 (#78001059)	Quartz Creek, Pine and Main Sts. 43°48′07″N 115°07′47″W	Atlanta	
6	Atlanta Ranger Station Historic District	Atlanta Ranger Station Historic District	January 23, 2003 (#02001726)	Boise National Forest; 43°48′18″N 115°07′49″W	Atlanta	
7	Elmore County Courthouse	Elmore County Courthouse	September 22, 1987 (#87001584)	150 S. 4th East; 43°07′54″N 115°41′25″W	Mountain Home	
8	Featherville School		December 2, 2019 (#100004709)	4348 N. Pine-Featherville Rd. 43°36′34″N 115°15′34″W	Featherville	
9	Glenns Ferry School	Glenns Ferry School	September 7, 1984 (#84001122)	161 W. Cleveland Ave. 42°57′01″N 115°18′02″W	Glenns Ferry	Now Glenns Ferry Historical Museum
10	Gorby Opera Theater	Gorby Opera Theater	November 17, 1982 (#82000339)	128 E. Idaho Ave. 42°57′15″N 115°17′55″W	Glenns Ferry	
11	Guffey Butte – Black Butte Archeological District	Guffey Butte – Black Butte Archeological District	October 10, 1978 (#78001038)	Along approximately 34 miles (55 km) of the Snake River in Canyon, Ada, Owyhee, and Elmore counties 43°05′11″N 116°11′29″W	Grand View	
12	Hammett School	Hammett School	October 10, 2024 (#100010906)	499 S. School House Rd. 42°56′47″N 115°28′08″W	Hammett	
13	KwikCurb Diner	KwikCurb Diner	July 26, 2010 (#10000502)	850 S. 3rd West Street; 43°07′22″N 115°41′24″W	Mountain Home	
14	Father Lobell House	Father Lobell House	November 17, 1982 (#82000338)	125 N. 4th East St. 43°07′56″N 115°41′29″W	Mountain Home	Building no longer exists.
15	J. S. McGinnis Building	J. S. McGinnis Building	November 17, 1982 (#82000340)	71–83 N. Commercial St. 42°57′15″N 115°18′02″W	Glenns Ferry	
16	Mountain Home Baptist Church	Mountain Home Baptist Church	November 17, 1982 (#82000341)	265 N. 4th East St. 43°08′00″N 115°41′33″W	Mountain Home	Building no longer exists.
17	Mountain Home Carnegie Library	Mountain Home Carnegie Library	July 24, 1978 (#78001061)	180 S. 3rd East; 43°07′51″N 115°41′28″W	Mountain Home	
18	Mountain Home High School	Mountain Home High School	August 8, 1991 (#91000988)	550 E. Jackson St. 43°08′00″N 115°41′18″W	Mountain Home	
19	Mountain Home Hotel	Mountain Home Hotel	October 29, 1982 (#82000385)	195 N. 2nd West St. 43°07′50″N 115°41′47″W	Mountain Home	
20	O'Neill Brothers Building	O'Neill Brothers Building	November 17, 1982 (#82000342)	36 E. Idaho Ave. 42°57′14″N 115°17′59″W	Glenns Ferry	
21	Our Lady of Limerick Catholic Church	Our Lady of Limerick Catholic Church	November 17, 1982 (#82000343)	113 W. Arthur Ave. 42°57′00″N 115°17′56″W	Glenns Ferry	
22	St. James Episcopal Church	St. James Episcopal Church	October 5, 1977 (#77000460)	305 N. 3rd East St. 43°08′00″N 115°41′38″W	Mountain Home	
23	South Boise Historic Mining District	South Boise Historic Mining District	December 30, 1975 (#75000629)	In the Boise and Sawtooth National Forests; 43°41′31″N 115°15′54″W	Rocky Bar	10 square mile gold mining district including the ghost town of Rocky Bar, Idaho
24	Strategic Air Command Ground Alert Facility, Mountain Home Air Force Base		December 11, 2023 (#100009818)	12 Bomber Road; 43°02′33″N 115°51′13″W	Mountain Home Air Force Base	
25	Turner Hotel	Turner Hotel	September 7, 1984 (#84001124)	140-170 E. Jackson St. 43°07′52″N 115°41′36″W	Mountain Home	

== See also ==
- List of National Historic Landmarks in Idaho
- National Register of Historic Places listings in Idaho
