= Our Lady of Limerick Catholic Church (Glenns Ferry, Idaho) =

Historic church in Idaho, United States

- U.S. National Register of Historic Places
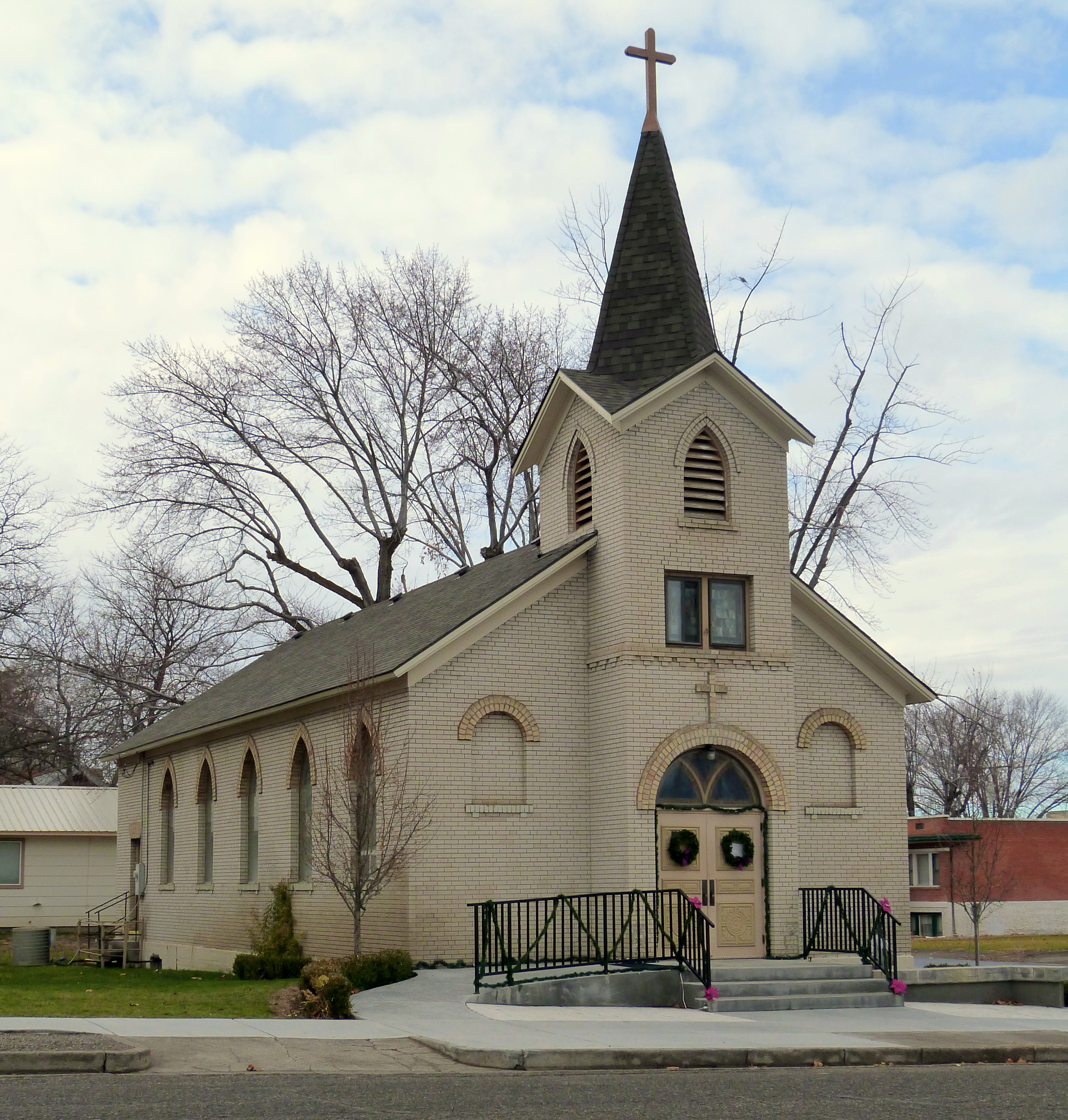
- The church in 2012

- Location within Idaho
- Location: 113 West Arthur, Glenns Ferry, Idaho
- Coordinates: 42°57′01″N 115°17′52″W
- Area: less than one acre
- Built: 1915
- Architect: Tourtellotte & Hummel
- Architectural style: Late Gothic Revival, Romanesque
- MPS: Tourtellotte and Hummel Architecture TR
- NRHP reference No.: 82000343
- Added to NRHP: November 17, 1982

Our Lady of Limerick Catholic Church is a historic church building in Glenns Ferry, Idaho. It was built in 1915, and designed in the Gothic Revival and Romanesque Revival architectural styles. It is "a rectangular white brick structure, gable-roofed with a front-to-back ridgebeam and a partially outset steeple/belfry/entry tower centered on the front elevation." It has been listed on the National Register of Historic Places since November 17, 1982.
