= Atlanta Airport (disambiguation) =

Atlanta Airport may refer to:

- Hartsfield-Jackson Atlanta International Airport serving Atlanta, Georgia, United States (FAA: ATL; ICAO: KATL)
- Atlanta Airport (Idaho) serving Atlanta, Idaho, United States (FAA: 55H)
- Atlanta Municipal Airport serving Atlanta, Michigan, United States (FAA: Y93)

== See also ==
- List of airports in the Atlanta area, for Atlanta, Georgia
