= Blue Heart Springs =

Thermal spring in Idaho

- Interactive map of Blue Heart Springs
- Location: Gooding County, Idaho, United States
- Coordinates: 42.7105°N 114.8298°W
- Spring source: Aquifer
- Elevation: 2,877 ft (877 m)
- Type: Seepage
- Temperature: 58 °F (14.4 °C)

Blue Heart Springs is a natural spring that is located along the Snake River near the Thousand Springs State Park in Hagerman, Idaho, and is the 13th largest freshwater spring in North America. The springs are accessible by water travel only, and are 1.5 miles (2.41 km) downstream from Banbury Hot Springs, and are 10.3 miles (16.57 km) from Hagerman. The springs are composed of a heart-shaped cove filled with crystal blue water, hence the springs' namesake. The springs are also surrounded by melon gravel walls.

It is believed that the cove that contains the springs was formed by a whirlpool caused by the Bonneville Flood around 15,000 years ago. This whirlpool also carved down to the Snake River Aquifer, which created the springs' water supply that percolates through the layers of sand to fill the cove. It is estimated that the water inside of Blue Heart Springs is underground for 100 to 150 years before reaching the surface. The water constantly remains at 58 °F (14.4 °C) year-round.
