= Gravel =

Mix of crumbled stones

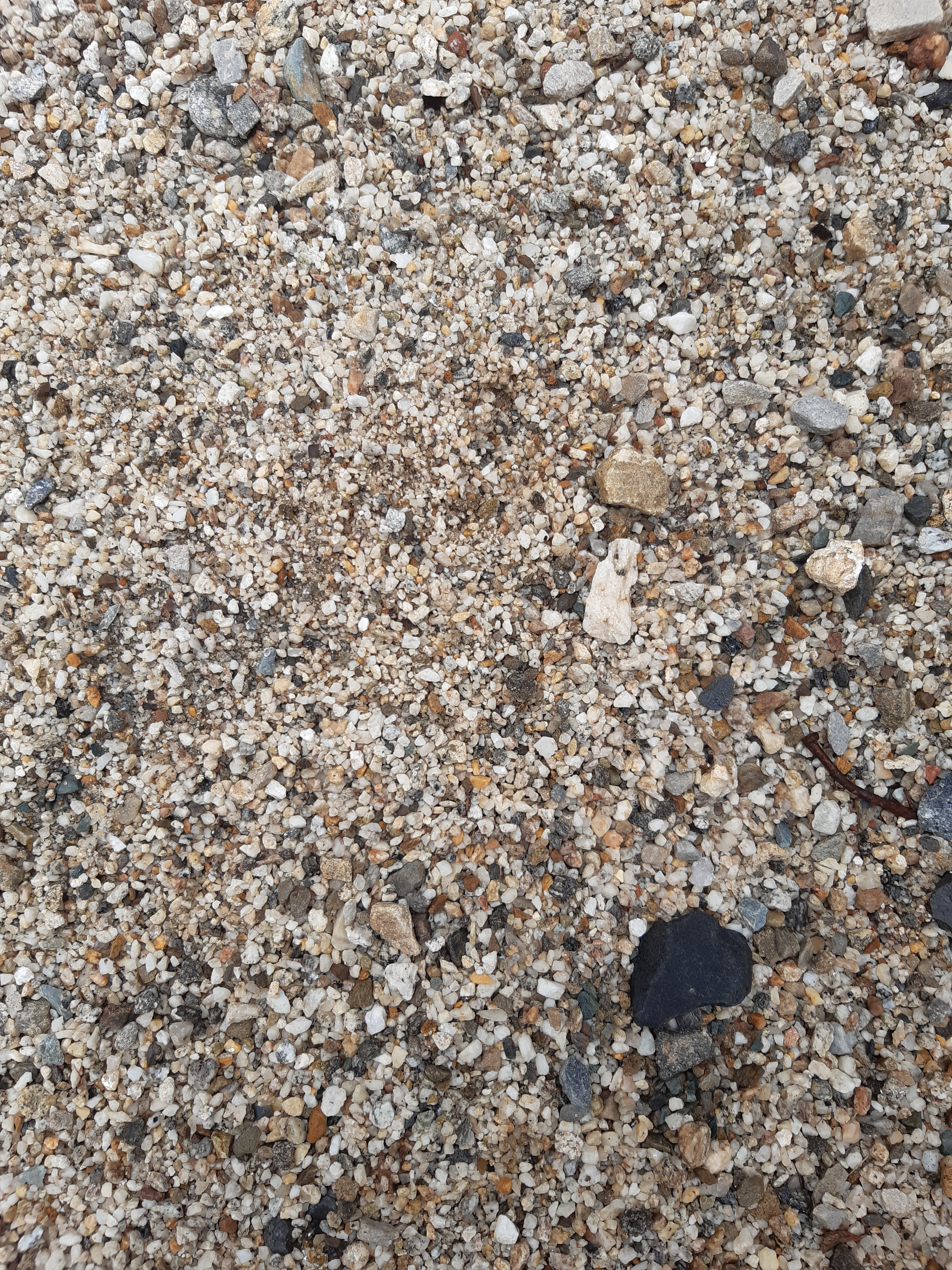
Gravel (largest fragment in this photo is about 40 mm (1.6 in))

Gravel (/ˈɡrævəl/) is a loose aggregation of rock fragments. Gravel occurs naturally on Earth as a result of sedimentary and erosive geological processes; it is also produced in large quantities commercially as crushed stone.

Gravel is classified by particle size range and includes size classes from granule- to boulder-sized fragments. In the Udden-Wentworth scale gravel is categorized into granular gravel (2–4 mm or 0.079–0.157 in) and pebble gravel (4–64 mm or 0.2–2.5 in). ISO 14688 grades gravels as fine, medium, and coarse, with ranges 2–6.3 mm (0.079–0.248 in) for fine and 20–63 mm (0.79–2.48 in) for coarse. One cubic metre of gravel typically weighs about 1,800 kg (4,000 lb), or one cubic yard weighs about 3,000 lb (1,400 kg).

Gravel is an important commercial product, with a number of applications. Almost half of all gravel production is used as aggregate for concrete. Much of the rest is used for road construction, either in the road base or as the road surface (with or without asphalt or other binders.) Naturally occurring porous gravel deposits have a high hydraulic conductivity, making them important aquifers.

== Definition and properties ==
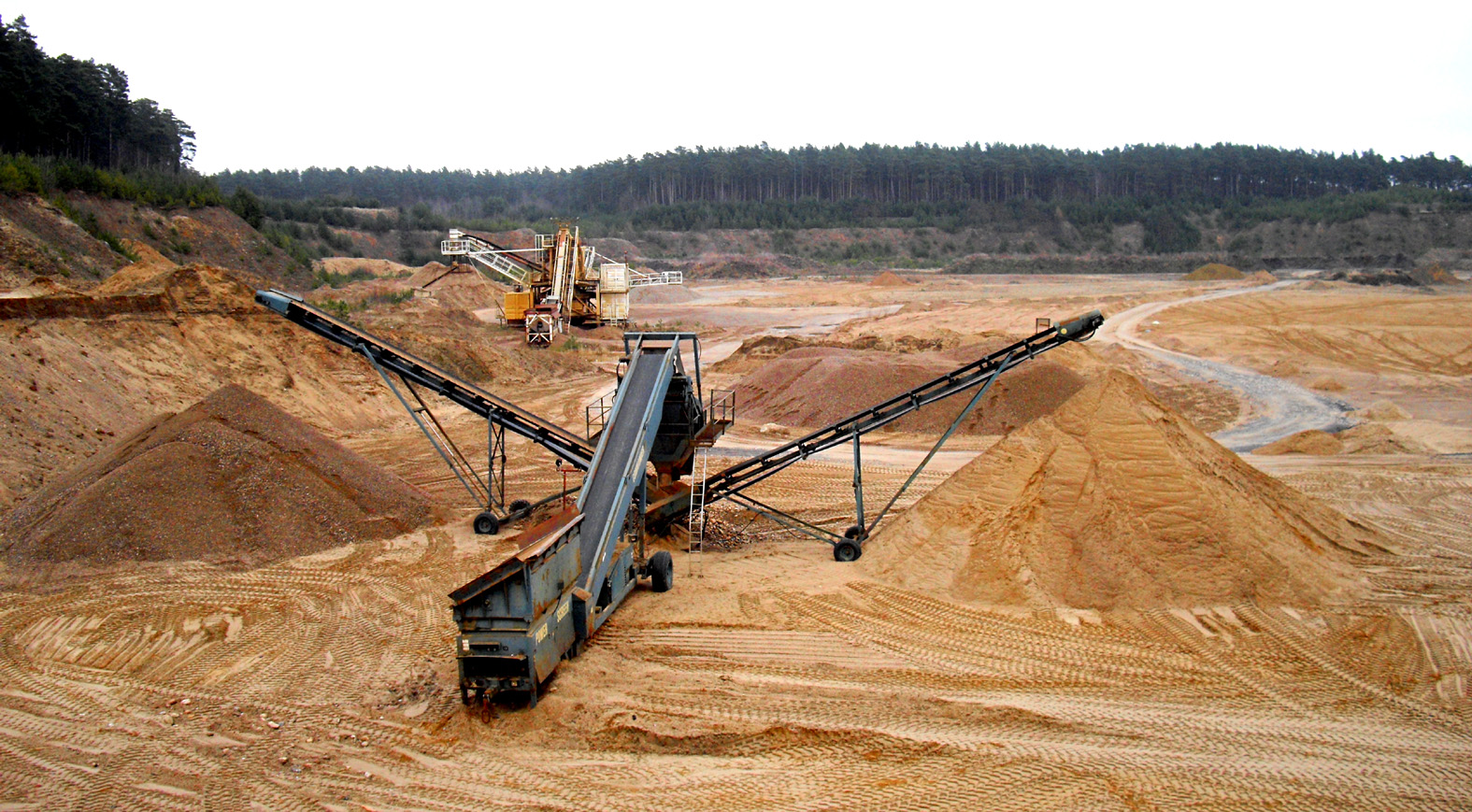
Sand and gravel separator in a gravel pit in Germany

Colloquially, the term gravel is often used to describe a mixture of different size pieces of stone mixed with sand and possibly some clay. The American construction industry distinguishes between gravel (a natural material) and crushed stone (produced artificially by mechanical crushing of rock.)

The technical definition of gravel varies by region and by area of application. Many geologists define gravel simply as loose rounded rock particles over 2 mm (0.079 in) in diameter, without specifying an upper size limit. Gravel is sometimes distinguished from rubble, which is loose rock particles in the same size range but angular in shape. The Udden-Wentworth scale, widely used by geologists in the US, defines granular gravel as particles with a size from 2 to 4 mm (0.079 to 0.157 in) and pebble gravel as particles with a size from 4 to 64 mm (0.16 to 2.52 in). This corresponds to all particles with sizes between coarse sand and cobbles.

The U.S. Department of Agriculture and the Soil Science Society of America define gravel as particles from 2 to 80 mm (0.079 to 3.150 in) in size, while the German scale (Atterburg) defines gravel as particles from 2 to 200 mm (0.079 to 7.874 in) in size. The U.S. Army Corps of Engineers defines gravel as particles under 3 in (76 mm) in size that are retained by a number 4 mesh, which has a mesh spacing of 4.76 mm (0.187 in). ISO 14688 for soil engineering grades gravels as fine, medium, and coarse with ranges 2 mm to 6.3 mm to 20 mm to 63 mm.

The bulk density of gravel varies from 1,460 to 1,920 kg/m^{3} (2,460 to 3,240 lb/cu yd). Natural gravel has a high hydraulic conductivity, sometimes reaching above 1 cm/s.

== Origin ==
Most gravel is derived from disintegration of bedrock as it weathers. Quartz is the most common mineral found in gravel, as it is hard, chemically inert, and lacks cleavage planes along which the rock easily splits. Most gravel particles consist of multiple mineral grains, since few rocks have mineral grains coarser than about 8 millimeters (0.31 in) in size. Exceptions include quartz veins, pegmatites, deep intrusions, and high-grade metamorphic rock. The rock fragments are rapidly rounded as they are transported by rivers, often within a few tens of kilometers of their source outcrops.

Gravel is deposited as gravel blankets or bars in stream channels; in alluvial fans; in near-shore marine settings, where the gravel is supplied by streams or erosion along the coast; and in the deltas of swift-flowing streams. The upper Mississippi embayment contains extensive chert gravels thought to have their origin less than 100 miles (160 km) from the periphery of the embayment.

It has been suggested that wind-formed (aeolian) gravel "megaripples" in Argentina have counterparts on the planet Mars.

== Production and uses ==
Sand and gravel industrial production

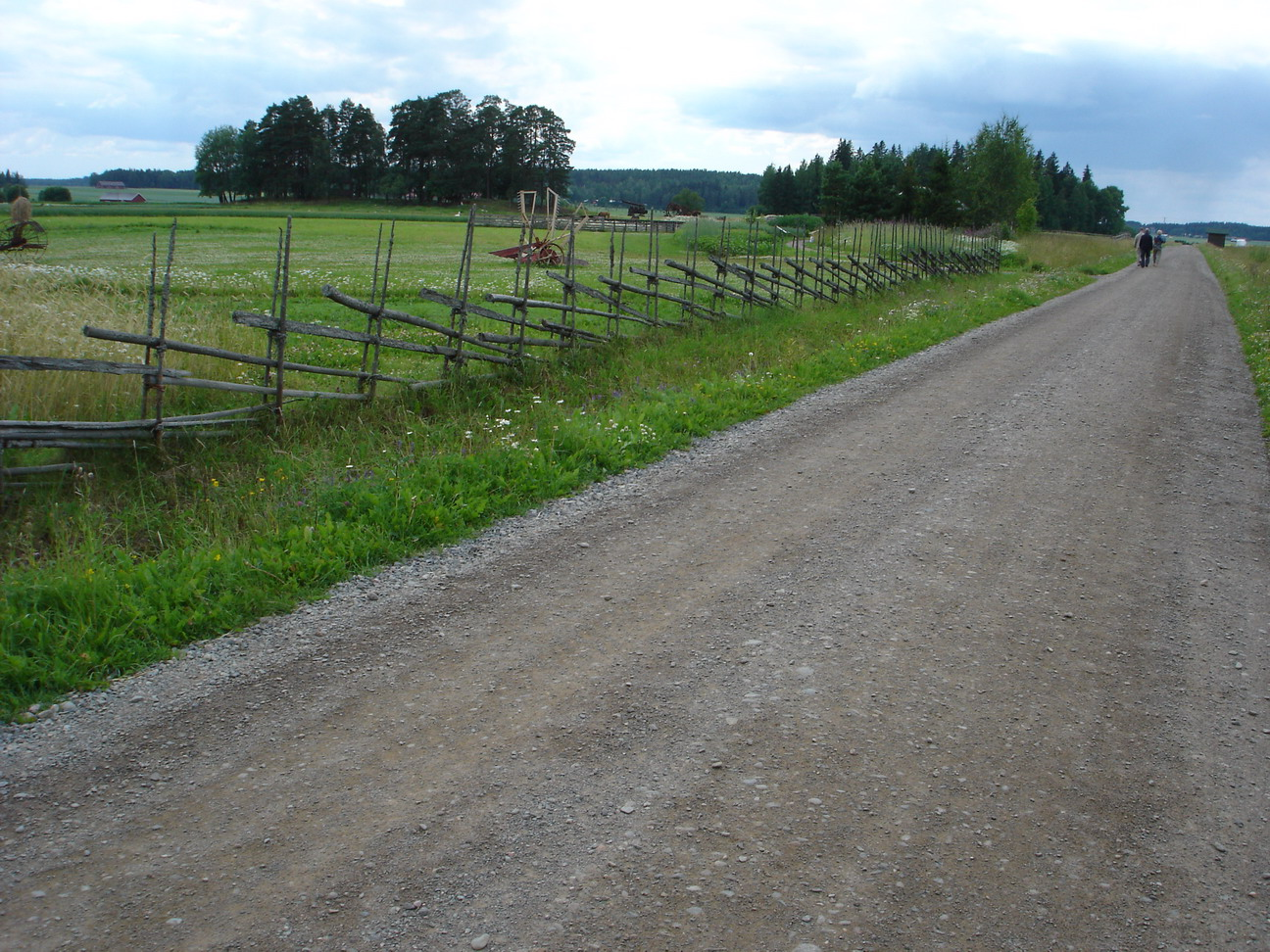
A gravel road in Finland

Gravel is a major basic raw material in construction. Sand is not usually distinguished from gravel in official statistics, but crushed stone is treated as a separate category. In 2020, sand and gravel together made up 23% of all industrial mineral production in the U.S., with a total value of about $12.6 billion. Some 960 million tons of construction sand and gravel were produced. This greatly exceeds production of industrial sand and gravel (68 million tons), which is mostly sand rather than gravel.

It is estimated that almost half of construction sand and gravel is used as aggregate for concrete. Other important uses include in road construction, as road base or in blacktop; as construction fill; and in myriad minor uses.

Gravel is widely and plentifully distributed, mostly as river deposits, river flood plains, and glacial deposits, so that environmental considerations and quality dictate whether alternatives, such as crushed stone, are more economical. Crushed stone is already displacing natural gravel in the eastern United States, and recycled gravel is also becoming increasingly important.

== Etymology ==
The word gravel comes from the Old French gravele or gravelle.

== Types ==
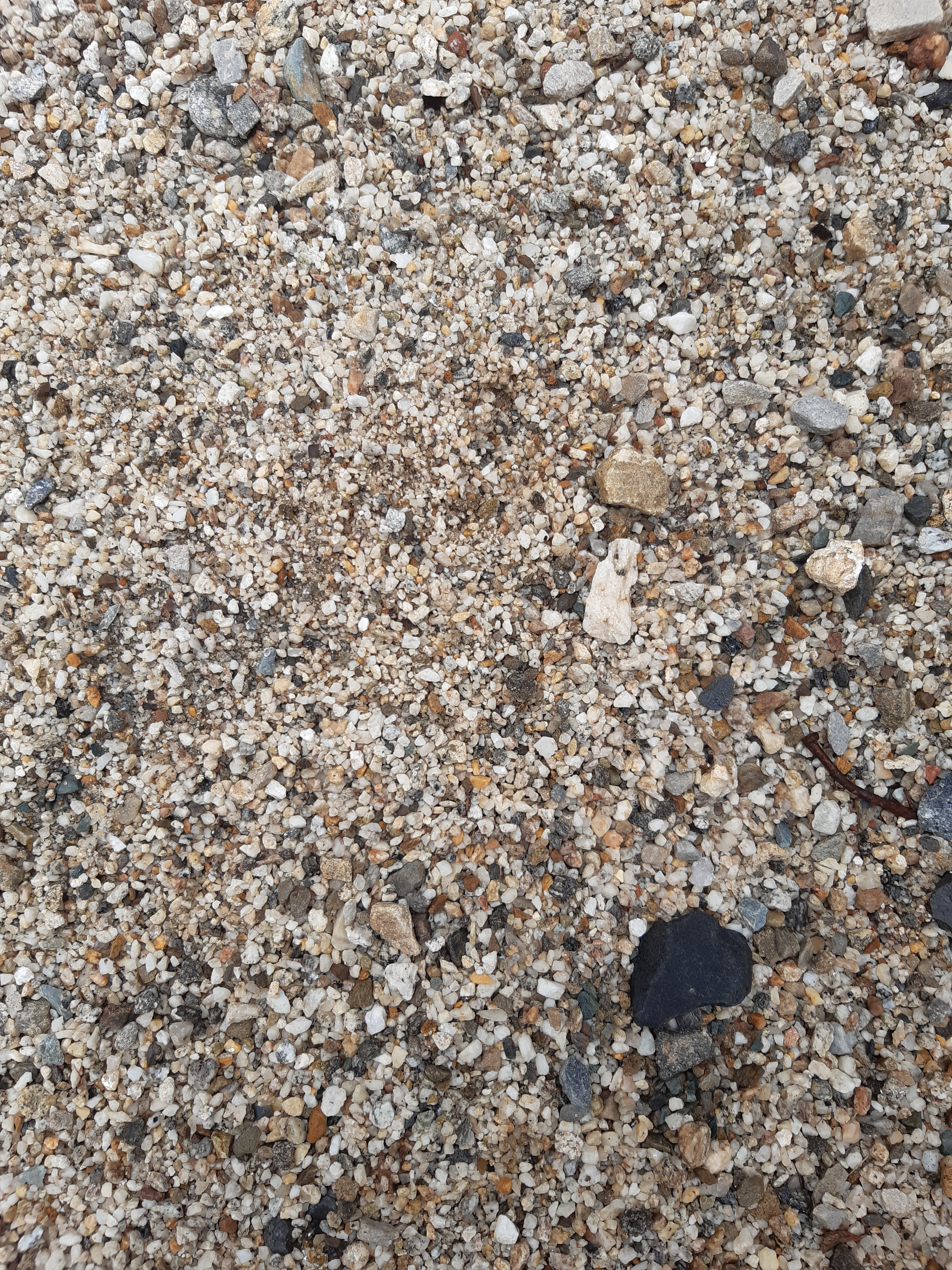
Naturally occurring sedimentary gravel bed

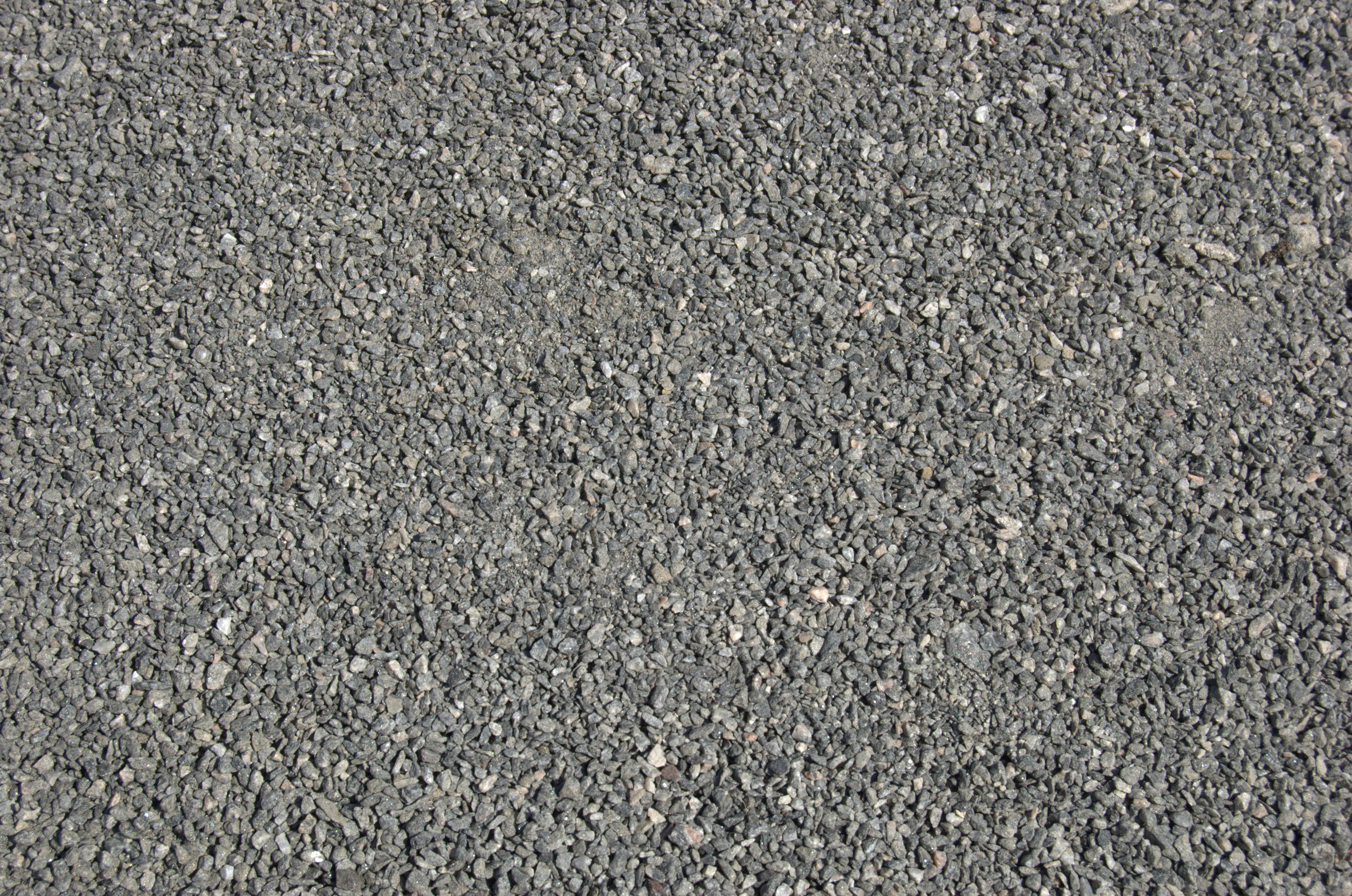
Graded mechanically crushed stone, with particle sizes roughly between 5 and 15 mm

Different varieties of gravel are distinguished by their composition, origin, and use cases. Types of gravel include:

Bank gravel
naturally deposited gravel intermixed with sand or clay found in and next to rivers and streams. Also known as "bank run" or "river run".
Bench gravel
a bed of gravel located on the side of a valley above the present stream bottom, indicating the former location of the stream bed when it was at a higher level. The term is most commonly used in Alaska and the Yukon Territory.
Crushed stone
rock crushed and graded by screens and then mixed to a blend of stones and fines. It is widely used as a surfacing for roads and driveways, sometimes with tar applied over it. Crushed stone may be made from granite, limestone, dolomite, and other rocks. Also known as "crusher run", DGA (dense grade aggregate) QP (quarry process), and shoulder stone. Crushed stone is distinguished from gravel by the U.S. Geological Survey.
Fine gravel
gravel consisting of particles with a diameter of 2 to 6.3 millimetres (0.079 to 0.248 in)
Lag gravel
a surface accumulation of coarse gravel produced by the removal of finer particles.
Pay gravel
also known as "pay dirt"; a nickname for gravel with a high concentration of gold and other precious metals. The metals are recovered through gold panning.
Pea gravel
also known as "pea shingle" is clean gravel similar in size to garden peas. Used for concrete surfaces, walkways, driveways and as a substrate in home aquariums.
Piedmont gravel
a coarse gravel carried down from high places by mountain streams and deposited on relatively flat ground, where the water runs more slowly.
Plateau gravel
a layer of gravel on a plateau or other region above the height at which stream-terrace gravel is usually found.
Shingle
Coarse, loose, well-rounded, waterworn, specifically alluvial and beach, sediment that is largely composed of smooth and spheroidal or flattened pebbles, cobbles, and sometimes small boulders, generally measuring 20 to 200 millimetres (0.79 to 7.87 in) in diameter.

== Relationship to plant life ==
In locales where gravelly soil is predominant, plant life is generally more sparse. This is due to the inferior ability of gravels to retain moisture, as well as the corresponding paucity of mineral nutrients, since finer soils that contain such minerals are present in smaller amounts.

== In the geologic record ==
Sediments containing over 30% gravel that become lithified into solid rock are termed conglomerate. Conglomerates are widely distributed in sedimentary rock of all ages, but usually as a minor component, making up less than 1% of all sedimentary rock. Alluvial fans likely contain the largest accumulations of gravel in the geologic record. These include conglomerates of the Triassic basins of eastern North America and the New Red Sandstone of south Devon.

== See also ==
- Construction aggregate
- Melon gravel
- Pebble
- Rock
- Shingle beach
- Floater
- Lapilli
