= Guffey =

Guffey is a surname. Notable people with the surname include:

- Burnett Guffey (1905–1983), American cinematographer
- Cary Guffey (born 1972), American former child actor
- J. Roger Guffey (1929–2009), American lawyer and president of the Federal Reserve Bank of Kansas City
- James M. Guffey (1839–1930), American oilman and politician
- James Guffey (1982–2021), ring name Jimmy Rave, American professional wrestler
- Joseph F. Guffey (1870–1959), American businessman and politician

== See also ==
- Guffey Coal Act
- Celebration Park, an archaeological park in Idaho with historic Guffey railroad bridge
