= John W. Smith =

John W. Smith may refer to:

- John Walter Smith (1845–1925), politician from Maryland
- John William Smith (politician) (1792–1845), politician in the Republic of Texas
- John William Smith (legal writer) (1809–1845), English barrister and legal writer
- John W. Smith (Detroit mayor) (1882–1942), politician from Detroit
- Sir John Wilson Smith (1920–1995), English business and former Liverpool F.C. chairman
- John W. Smith, architect of Boise, Idaho, designer of Glenns Ferry School (1909)
- John Smith (American wrestler), American wrestler, two-time Olympic gold medalist
