= Kitty Wilkins =

American horse breeder

Katherine Caroline Wilkins
- Born: May 15, 1857; Jacksonville, Oregon
- Died: October 8, 1936 (aged 79); Glenns Ferry, Idaho
- Resting place: Mountain View Cemetery, Mountain Home, Idaho
- Other name: Kitty or Kittie
- Known for: Horse Breeding

Katherine Caroline Wilkins (May 15, 1857 – October 8, 1936) was a horse breeder around the start of the 20th century, and renowned for being the "Horse Queen of Idaho." She was the only American woman at that time whose livelihood was based solely on the trade. The Wilkins Horse Company at Bruneau's Diamond Ranch supplied thousands of horses for customers all over North America.

== Early life ==
Kitty Wilkins was Western born and raised. Her parents, John R. and Laura (Smith) Wilkins emigrated by wagon train to Oregon City, Oregon not long after their marriage in 1853. According to regional historian Adelaide (Turner) Hawes, who knew Kitty personally, the couple's first child, “Burt” (Elbert or Albert), was born on the trip west.

Within a few years, the family moved to Jacksonville, near Medford, Oregon, where Katherine Caroline was born in 1857. Between July 1860 and May 1861, they moved to California. There, in Placerville, Kitty's brother Samuel was born. They next moved to the booming town of Florence, Idaho. Mrs. Wilkins was reportedly the first woman in that isolated mountain gold camp. Kitty and her siblings surely had few playmates outside the family.

Over the next several years, the family moved frequently. Their travels included stops in Washington Territory and then Boise City, Idaho. In the late 1860s, they seemed to alternate between Boise and points in Eastern Oregon. Then, in late 1869, John bought the “long-established” City Market on Main Street in Boise. On December 6, he began advertising “the largest variety and best meats that can be procured in the Territory.”

Unfortunately, just a month later, a fire swept along the block and totally destroyed the City Market, along with eleven other businesses. John soon sold the now-empty lot. It's not clear where the family lived for the next few years. Still, they had the resources to send Kitty to school at the Sacred Heart Academy in Ogden, Utah. From the Academy, Kitty continued her education at the Notre Dame Convent school in San Jose, California. She learned to play the piano, after which her parents bought her a fine “Weber” piano.

In 1876, prospectors discovered a silver lode bonanza near the old gold mining town of Tuscarora, Nevada. That set off a huge rush into the area, swelling the population from about 150 to around 3,000. The rush soon drew John's attention. From a regional newspaper, we learn that “J. R. Wilkins of Idaho is building a new hotel in Tuscarora.”

Kitty seldom spoke of her life in Tuscarora. Being young, attractive, and talented – and given the times – she surely attracted more than her share of young male suitors. The venture prospered, but some time in 1879, the new hotel burned down. The structure was a total loss, yet the family was not at all destitute. Not only did John continue with other ventures, but Kitty, at least, was able to spend the following winter in San Francisco.

== Horse Queen of Idaho ==
During his years in Tuscarora, John Wilkins became interested in the Bruneau Valley, in Idaho, and the high rangeland to the south. By the spring of 1880, he had a fair holding of cattle and horses foraging there. Although he pursued other mining ventures in Central Idaho for a while, he also built up his herds in southern Idaho. Thus, in June 1885, he established a ranching station near what is now Murphy Hot Springs, on the Jarbidge River less than two miles from the Nevada border. By then, the Diamond brand of the Wilkins Company was well known, not only in Idaho, but in midwestern horse markets.

In June 1887, a newspaper “Brevity” reported that Kitty and her brothers had “shipped two carloads of horses to the Omaha market” from Mountain Home. The family had discovered that Kitty not only had a special knack for horse-raising, but she was also an astute and effective marketer and salesperson.

Some newspapers called her a “cattle queen.” However, in 1887, Kitty told an interviewer, “That is incorrect. The Wilkins Company of Idaho own[s] both horses and cattle, and this is how the mistake originated, but my own specialty is horses.” In fact, the article headline called her “A Horse Queen,” and she was known by the label for the rest of her life. At least one clever writer took it further to call her the “Queen of Diamonds,” based on the company brand.

She was, in fact, vastly ahead of her time, and not just by being a very successful woman in a man's business. Kitty quickly learned that she was news, just by what she was, and she also sensed the value of a good story. In the same 1887 interview, she told the tale of how she had actually entered the horse business when she was just a little girl. (She had perhaps honed her presentation even before this point.)

During their constant moves, she said, friends had given her parents two $20 gold pieces as a going-away present for the two-year-old infant. A few years later, when her father purchased a band of horses in Oregon, “he bethought him[self] of my $40, and seeing a fine filly left, offered $40 for her.” Although the asking price was $50, the seller let it go for the lower price. Perhaps father John told him the filly was for his little girl, but Kitty left it to the reporter to “fill in the blanks” on that notion.

For over thirty years, the Wilkins ranch shipped thousands of horse all over the country and into Canada, sometimes as far north as the Yukon Territory. Early on, they had imported blooded stock to upgrade the herds. Thus, she developed top-notch stock that was specially bred for different markets: Clydesdale and Percheron lines for heavy freight, Morgans for saddle and harness, and so on. Customers included the U. S. Cavalry, and some of her best stock went to Buffalo Bill Cody's Wild West Show.

During all that time, Kitty not only ran the horse operation, she also handled the marketing and sales; almost always traveling by herself. That too was unusual, and brought her further attention. In fact, she caused a sensation wherever she went with her loads of horses. A reporter for the Denver Post larded his interview article with effusive praise: “Her face glowed with intelligence, gentle humor and glorious health, such as can only be acquired by outdoor life, and that is the life that is led by Miss Kitty C. Wilkins, the wonderful horse raiser of Bruneau, Idaho.”

Still, the reporter did acknowledge, and discuss, her business skills. In closing, he noted that Kitty, “has made a magnificent success of horse ranching, in which enterprise so many men have made failures.”

That same writer also described her dislike of automobiles, which she considered “ugly” and “unsafe.” But Wilkins could see the trend as well as anyone else. It's not entirely clear when she began to cut back the operation. That surely received further impetus when, in 1910, a late-coming homesteader successfully contested their weak title to the tract of land near Murphy Hot Springs.

World War I provided one last surge of business for the Wilkins Ranch. They sold thousands of horses to the U. S. Army. After the War, however, the market for horses dwindled rapidly. She moved from the ranch to a fine home in Glenns Ferry, Idaho in the early Twenties, perhaps not long after her mother died there in February 1921.

== Later life ==
Kitty Wilkins remained single for her entire life. There are some reports that she was engaged to marry her foreman, Joseph Pellessier, when he was killed in a range dispute in 1909. Historian Hawes, noted above, makes no mention of such an arrangement. Kitty would have been 52 years old at the time; Pellessier was 45 when he was killed.

Kitty remained actively engaged with friends and family. According to Hawes, she “was extremely charitable toward the poor and unfortunate, though little of her charity is known to the world.” Philip Holman, who has studied Kitty's life extensively, said that, at her death, her papers contained “a number of unpaid bills and applications for public assistance.”

Kitty last appeared publicly for the 1934 Fort Boise Centennial Celebration, which commemorated the founding of the old Hudson's Bay Company station at the mouth of the Boise River. She died two years later in Glenns Ferry, and was buried in Mountain Home.
