= Guffey Butte–Black Butte Archeological District =

- Guffey Butte-Black Butte Archeological District
- U.S. National Register of Historic Places
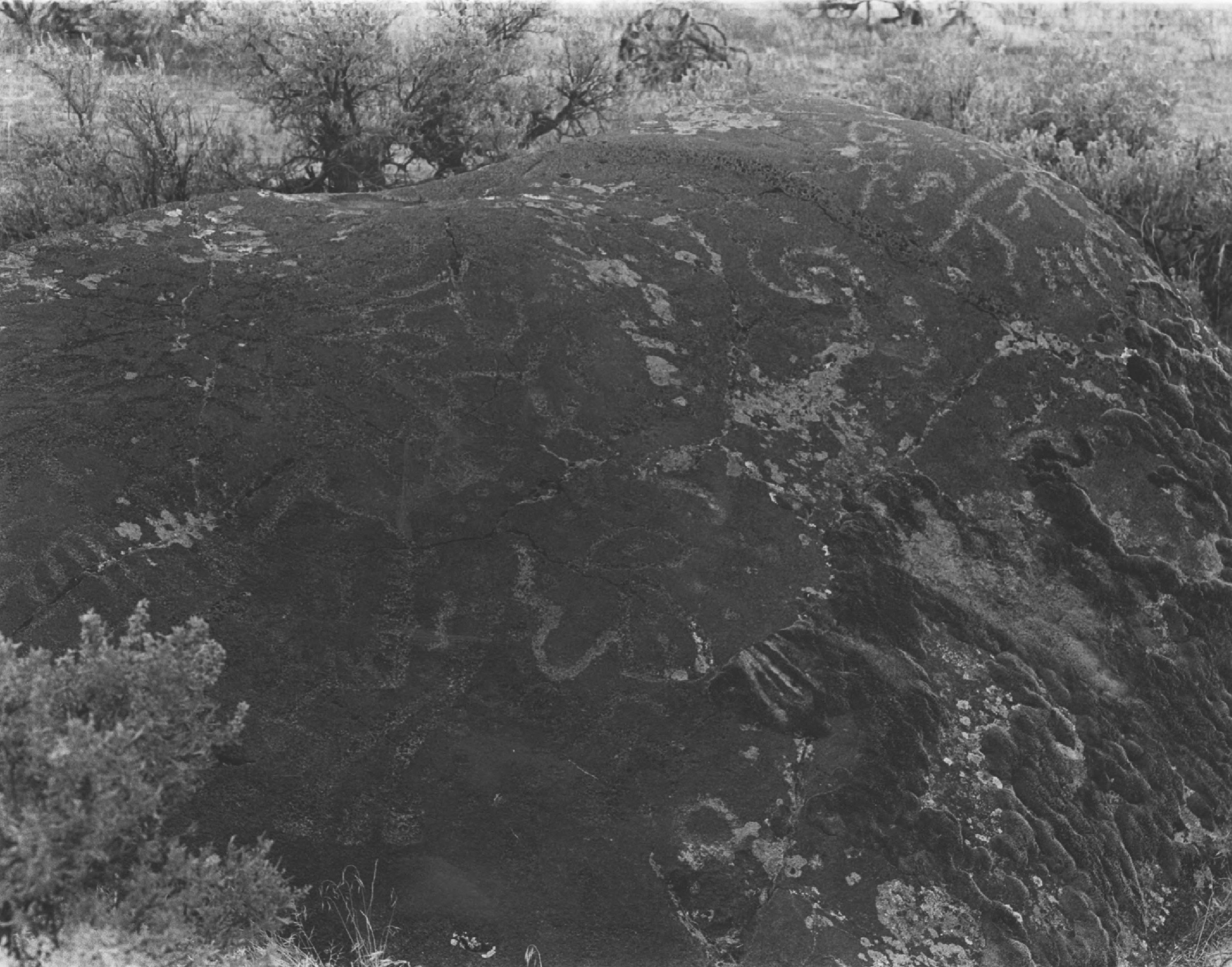
- Petroglyph boulder in Owyhee County portion of the district, October 1976

- Location within Idaho Location within the United States
- Coordinates: 43.299253°N 116.521777°W
- Area: 14,000 acres (57 km^{2})
- NRHP reference No.: 78001038
- Added to NRHP: October 10, 1978

The Guffey Butte–Black Butte Archeological District is a 14,000 acres (57 km^{2}) historic district in southwestern Idaho, United States, that is listed on the National Register of Historic Places (NRHP). It includes numerous archeological sites in Ada, Canyon, Elmore, and Owyhee counties.

== Description ==
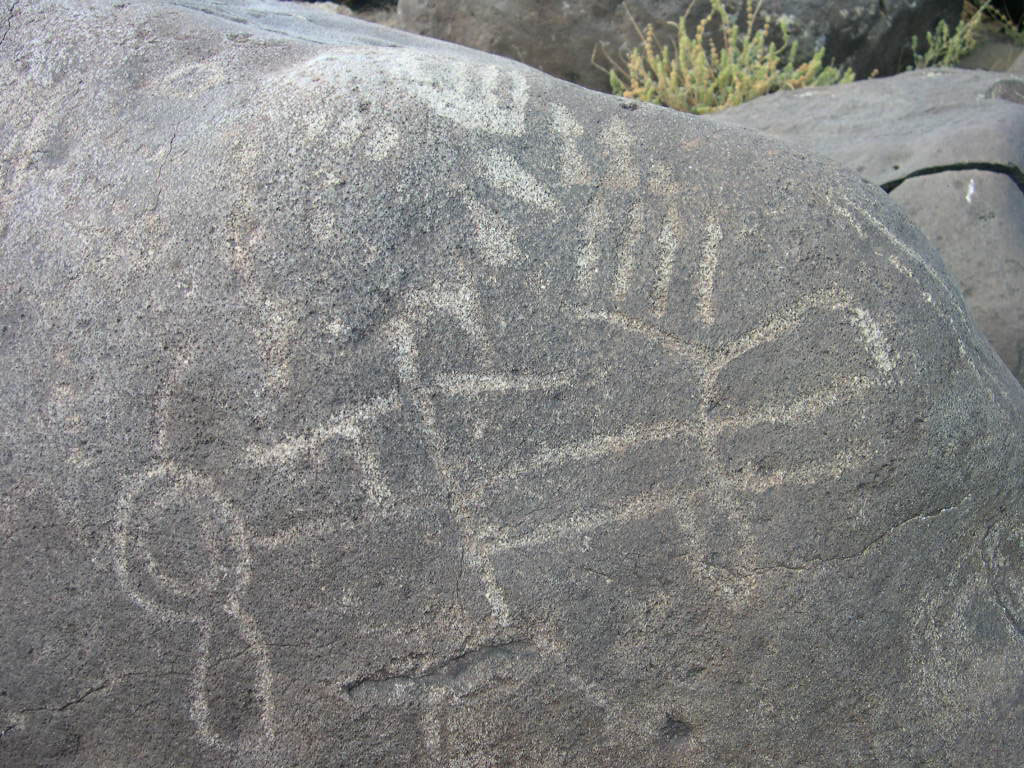
Petroglyph in Celebration Park, April 2010

The district includes 117 contributing sites and one contributing structure. Celebration Park, in the district, protects a set of archeological resources that are part of the historic district.

The district runs approximately 34 miles (55 km) along the Snake River in all four counties

It is an area which was densely populated in prehistoric times, and was listed for its information potential.

It includes the old townsite of Guffey which was a railroad construction camp in 1897, and then soon abandoned in favor of competitor Murphy.

It includes the Guffey Railroad Bridge, the first bridge over the Snake River in the area, which was built during 1896–97.

It includes the Swan Falls Dam and Power Plant, which is separately listed on the National Register.

Guffey Butte is a climbing peak in Owyhee County. Geologically, it is a "basaltic maar and tuff cone complex that was formed about one million years ago near the southwestern margin of the western Snake River Plain. Its evolution was characterized by two distinctly similar, yet non-synchronous, sequences of events. The result of these events is a single complex volcanic structure composed of deposits from two separate vent systems."

The district was added to the NRHP October 10, 1978.

== See also ==
- National Register of Historic Places listings in Ada County, Idaho
- National Register of Historic Places listings in Canyon County, Idaho
- National Register of Historic Places listings in Elmore County, Idaho
- National Register of Historic Places listings in Owyhee County, Idaho
