= Pedro Anchustegui Pelota Court =

- U.S. National Register of Historic Places
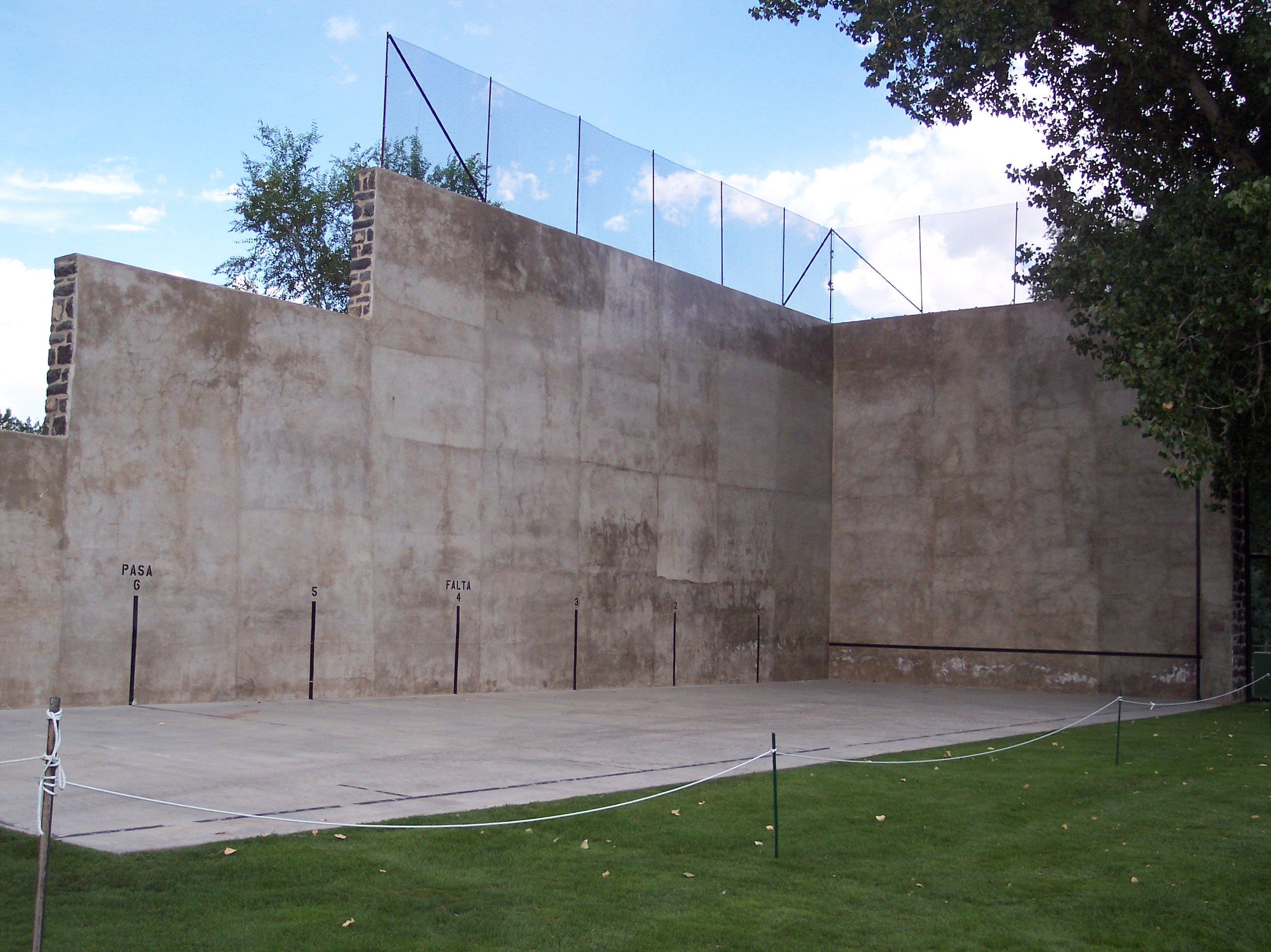

- Location within Idaho Location within the United States
- Location: W. 2nd North Street; Mountain Home, Idaho
- Coordinates: 43°07′49″N 115°41′50″W
- Area: less than one acre
- Built: 1908
- NRHP reference No.: 78001060
- Added to NRHP: January 30, 1978

The Pedro Anchustegui Pelota Court is a Basque pelota court located on West 2nd North Street in Mountain Home, Idaho. The court was built in 1908 during a period of Basque immigration to Idaho. Basque immigrants largely settled in the Boise and Mountain Home regions, where they herded sheep; Basque pelota, a sport similar to handball, was one of their main forms of recreation. The Pedro Anchustegui Pelota Court is the only outdoor Basque pelota court remaining in Idaho.

The court was added to the National Register of Historic Places on January 30, 1978.
