= South Boise Historic Mining District =

Historic district in Idaho, United States

- U.S. National Register of Historic Places
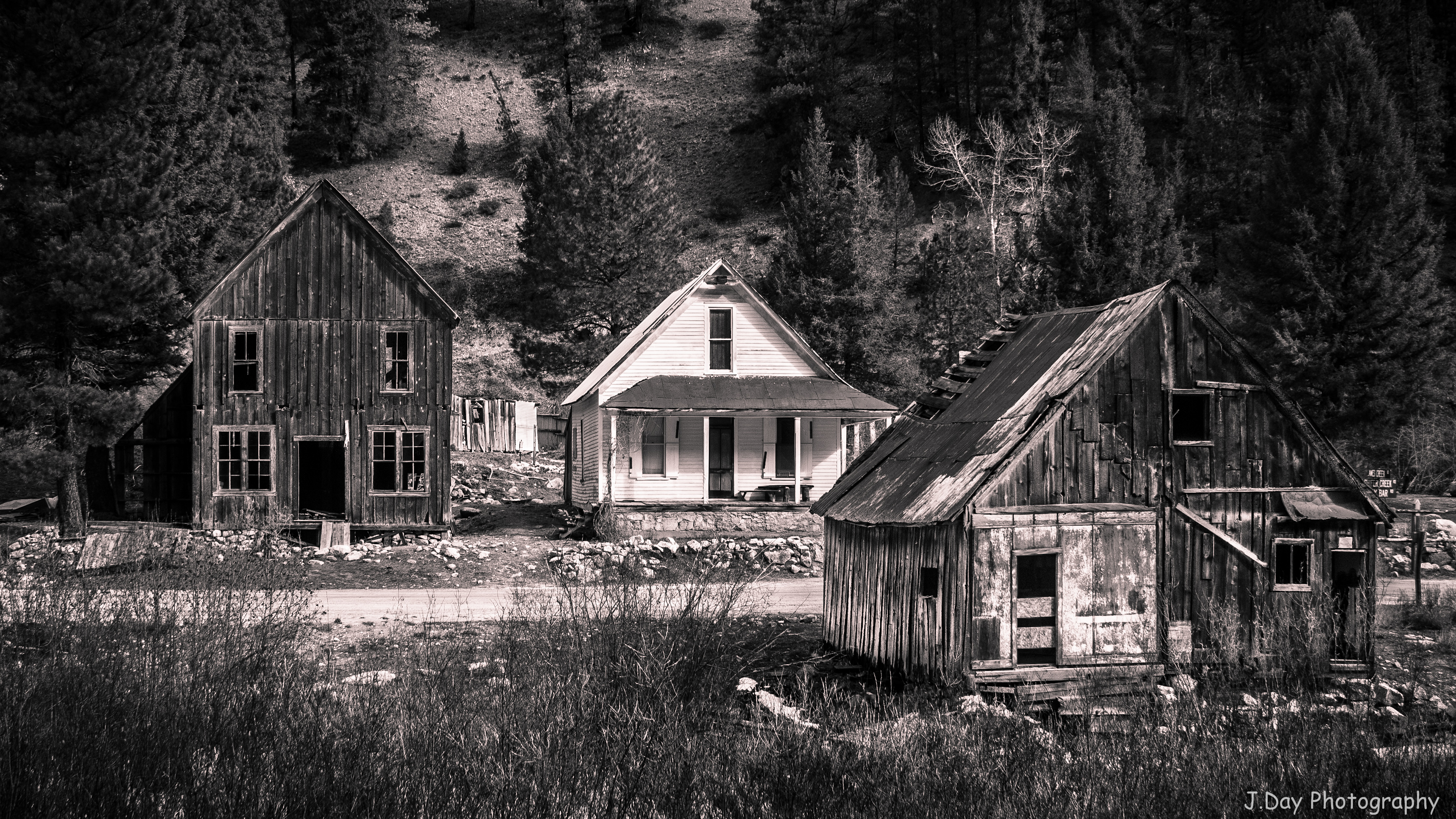
- Rocky Bar in 2012

- Location within Idaho Location within the United States
- Nearest city: Rocky Bar and, Idaho
- Coordinates: 43°41′31″N 115°15′54″W
- Area: 8,640 acres (35.0 km^{2})
- NRHP reference No.: 75000629
- Added to NRHP: December 30, 1975

The South Boise Historic Mining District, in Elmore County, Idaho and including Rocky Bar, Idaho, is a historic district which was listed on the National Register of Historic Places in 1975. It included eight contributing buildings and a contributing site on 8,640 acres (35.0 km^{2}), or about a ten square mile area.

It is located in the Boise National Forest and the Sawtooth National Forest..

It includes the ghost town of Rocky Bar and a good part of a large basin in which there was a great amount of gold mining. Rocky Bar has a historic cemetery, which among other graves has the grave of Idaho's territorial governor (acting) Clinton DeWitt Smith, whose death in Rocky Bar effectively halted governance of the territory.

It includes Spanishtown, a few miles from Rocky Bar on Elk Creek, with similar utilitarian structures.

It includes the remains of a number of gold mines, some with remains of structures. Mining rose in 1865, then eventually peaked and declined in the 1890s.
