= Atlanta Airport (Idaho) =

Small airport

- IATA: none; ICAO: none; FAA LID: 55H

Summary
- Airport type: Public
- Owner: State of Idaho - ITD Division of Aeronautics
- Serves: Atlanta, Idaho
- Elevation AMSL: 5,500 ft (1,700 m)
- Coordinates: 43°48′49″N 115°08′06″W
- Interactive map of Atlanta Airport

Runways
Direction	Length		Surface
Direction	ft	m	Surface
16/34	2,460	750	Turf/dirt

Statistics (2005)
- Aircraft operations: 900
- Source: Federal Aviation Administration

Atlanta Airport (FAA LID: 55H) is a public airport located one mile (2 km) northwest of the central business district of Atlanta, an unincorporated community in Elmore County, Idaho, United States. It is owned by the State of Idaho, Idaho Transportation Department, Division of Aeronautics.

== Facilities and aircraft ==
Atlanta Airport covers an area of 14 acres (5.7 ha) and had one runway designated 16/34 with a 2,460 by 75 ft (750 by 23 m) turf/dirt surface. For the 12-month period ending July 29, 2005, the airport had 900 aircraft operations, an average of 75 per month: 89% general aviation and 11% air taxi.

== Video ==
- YouTube.com - Landing in Atlanta, Idaho
- YouTube.com - Maule MX-7 landing at Atlanta, Idaho
- YouTube.com - Maule MX-7 departure from Atlanta, Idaho

== See also ==
- List of airports in Idaho
