= Melon gravel =

Geological formation caused by the Bonneville Flood

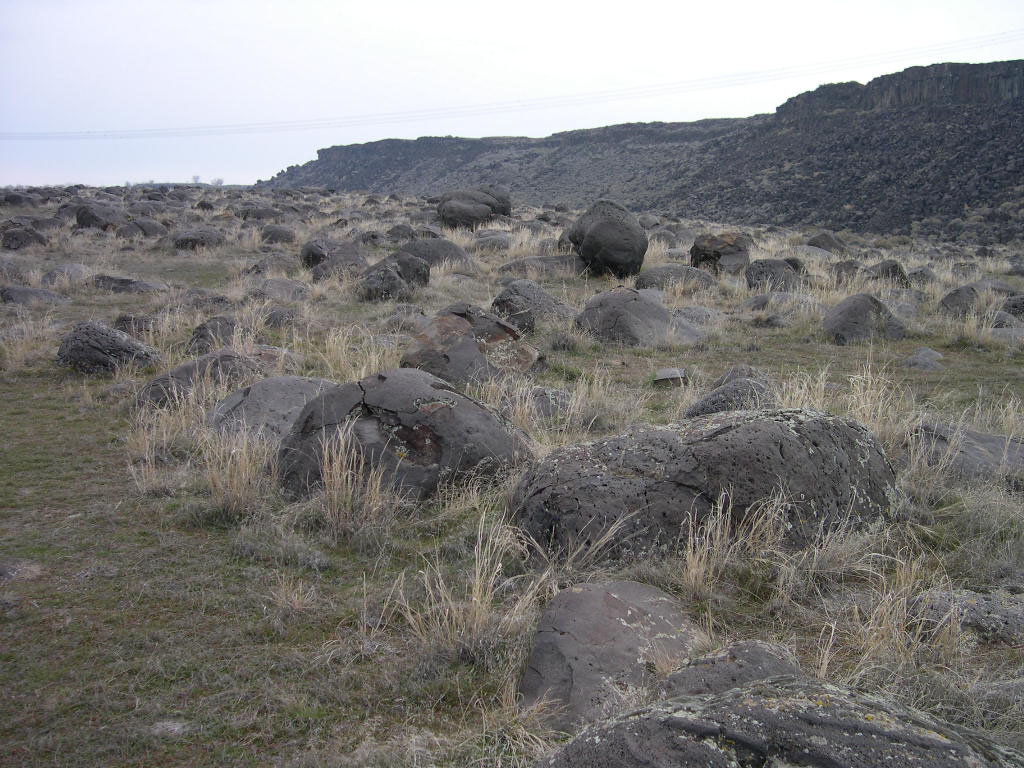
Melon gravel in southwestern Idaho, near Melba

Melon gravel are a geological deposit of mostly basalt boulders that were formed by the Lake Bonneville flood and deposited along the Snake River Plain in the western United States around 15,000 years ago. Melon gravel range in size from coarse sand to well over fifteen feet (4.6 m) in diameter, and generally appear rounded. Melon gravel were formed by the Bonneville Flood's intense erosion of the surrounding basalt flows of the area. This process also created several bars of melon gravel that, at their largest, can be one mile (1.6 km) long, 1.5 miles (2.4 km) wide, and 150 feet (46 m) deep.

Melon gravel are considered to be "the most easily recognized evidence of the catastrophic magnitude of the [Bonneville] flood". Melon gravel were named after road signs were put up advertising "petrified watermelons", with one sign urging people to "take one home to your mother-in-law!"

== Petroglyphs ==
The petroglyph locations of the Snake River Valley are selectively located on melon gravel. Researchers have pondered why Native American artisans used melon gravel instead of the Snake River Canyon's walls. One theory is that melon gravel were considered a sacred object to the local Native Americans.

In the western United States, power and life were considered to be closely linked with water in Native American spiritual beliefs. Many creation myths follow similar storylines of a water-covered Earth, and animals, like coyotes, turtles, weasels, or other water creatures, creating land and populating it. These beliefs have been recorded among the local indigenous groups in California, the Great Basin, and the Columbia Plateau.

The sacred power of water is also referenced in a Western Shoshone myth of purification:

Once upon a time there was a man. He got mad and said, 'Our land doesn't seem to smell good. Everything stinks. I think we better make another land.' They slept that night and all through in the night he sang and sang and sang. He wished for a great water. The great water came. It took everything away and cleaned up all the land. It washed the highest mountains everywhere. The people went to the top of the highest mountain and stayed there until the water went down. It went as this man wished it would. After the water died down, the land and everything was perfect and clean again.

Rock itself was also considered a powerful spiritual force. Shamans were, and still are, widely believed to have the ability to enter the sacred. One of the ways to enter the sacred was using rock art. In general, rock art is considered in many Native American beliefs to play a key role in myths, historical events, initiation events, and visions.

These ideas are applicable to the melon gravel formed by the Bonneville Flood, since Native populations were able to recognize that melon gravel were formed fluvially and thus attribute a sacred meaning to them, hence why they would choose melon gravel as petroglyph sites.

== See also ==
- Celebration Park
