= Glenns Ferry School =

- U.S. National Register of Historic Places
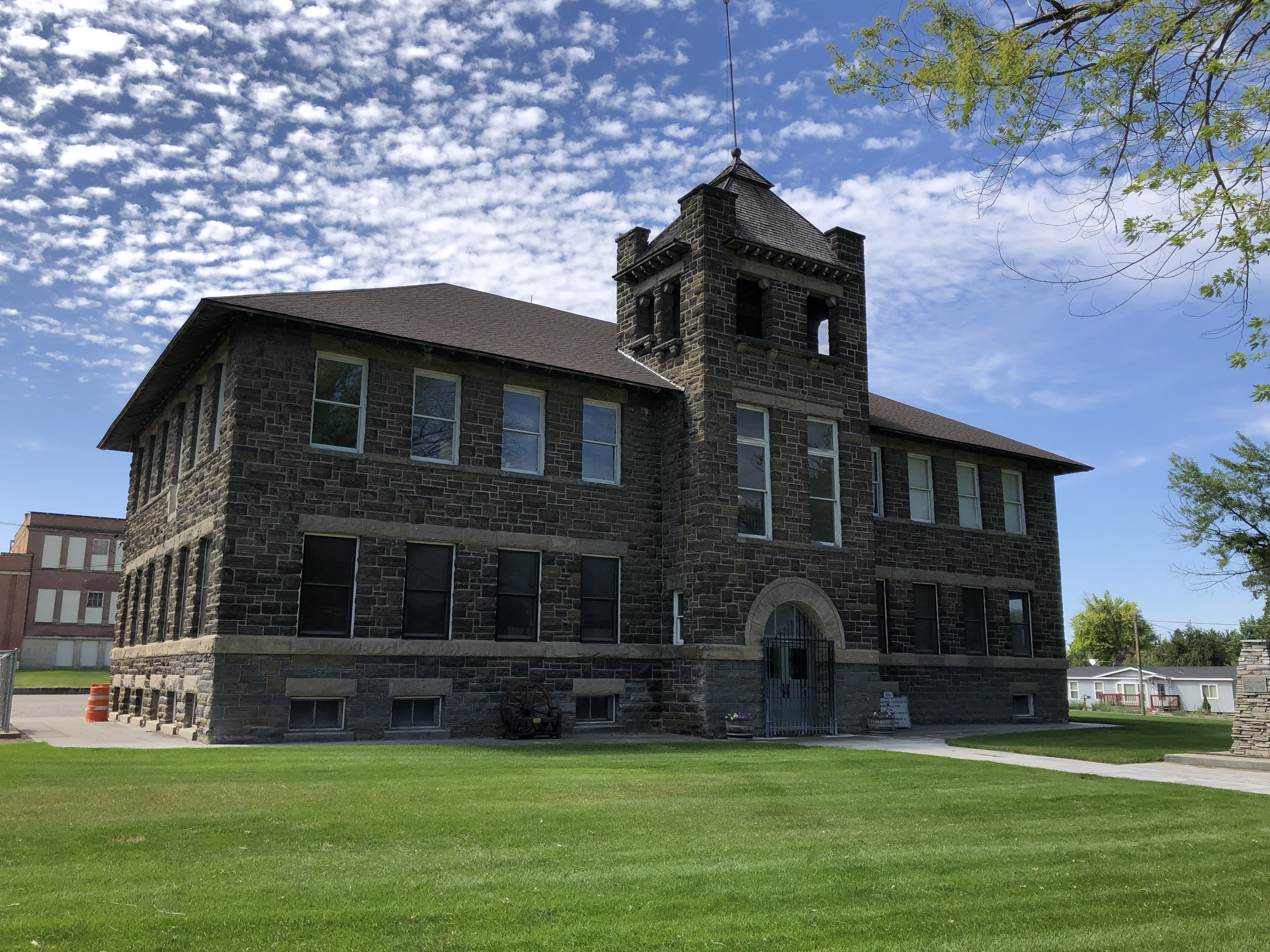

- Location within Idaho Location within the United States
- Location: 164 Cleveland Ave., Glenns Ferry, Idaho
- Coordinates: 42°57′01″N 115°18′02″W
- Area: 2 acres (0.81 ha)
- Built: 1909
- Architect: John W. Smith
- Architectural style: Romanesque Revival
- NRHP reference No.: 84001122
- Added to NRHP: September 7, 1984

The Glenns Ferry School, on Cleveland St. in Glenns Ferry, Idaho, was built in 1909. It was listed on the National Register of Historic Places in 1984. It was acquired by the city of Glenns Falls in 1986 and became the Glenns Ferry Historical Museum, which is open seasonally.

It is a two-and-a-half-story building upon on a raised basement, built of native stone, sitting centered in its own city block. It has 10 bays on its front, northwest facade, six on each side facade, and 11 on the rear, southeast facade. Its main entrance has double doors within a Romanesque-style arch. It was designed by Boise architect John W. Smith.

It has also been known as Glenns Ferry High School; it served as a general school until 1923, and thereafter as an elementary school.

A second contributing building is a one-story brick lavatory building with a pyramidal roof, built directly behind the school, sometime between 1911 and 1928.

It is located at 161 W. Cleveland Ave.
