= Rocky Bar, Idaho =

Ghost town in Idaho, U.S.

Coordinates: 43°41′21″N 115°17′24″W

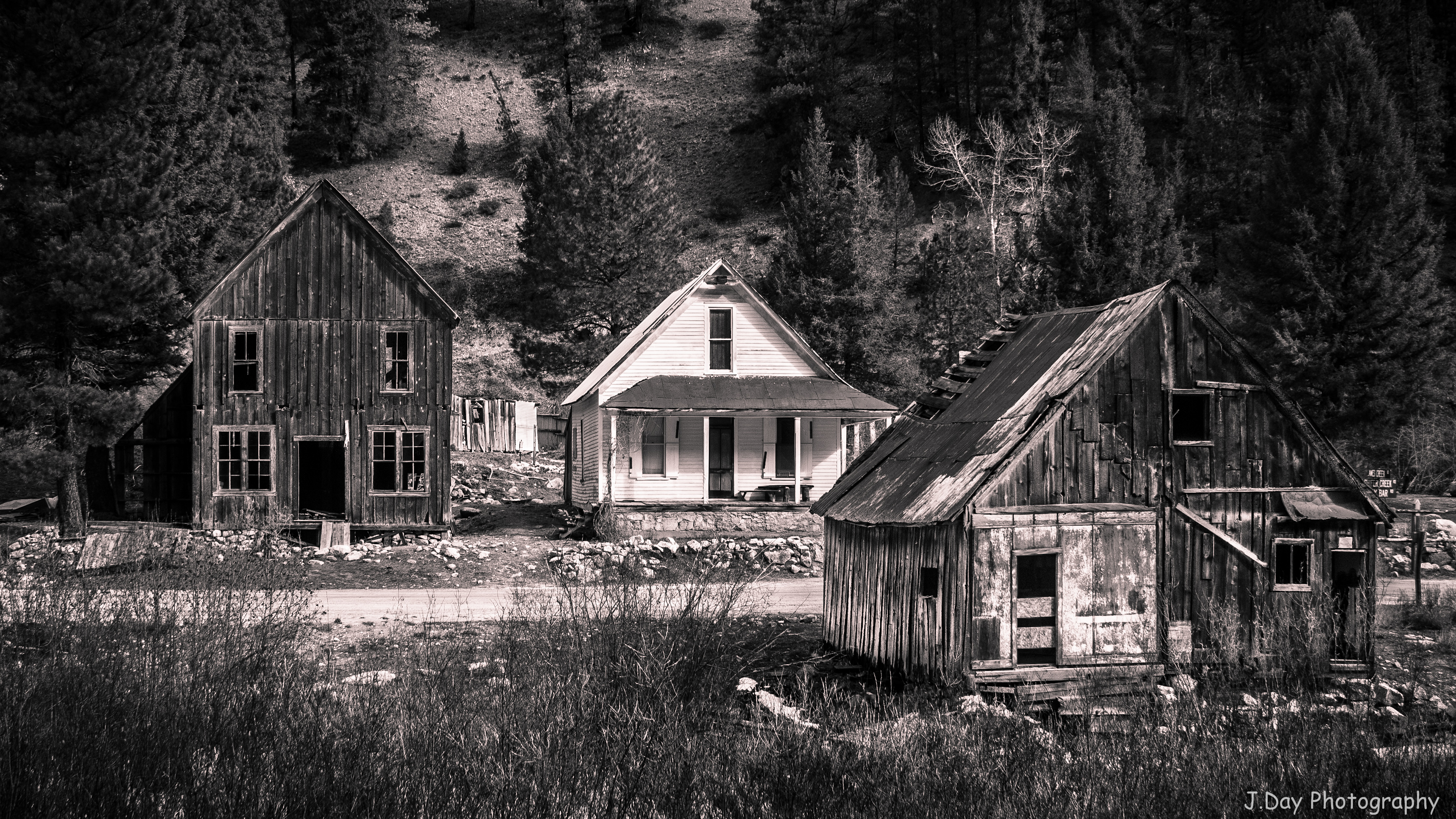
Rocky Bar, Idaho Ghost town

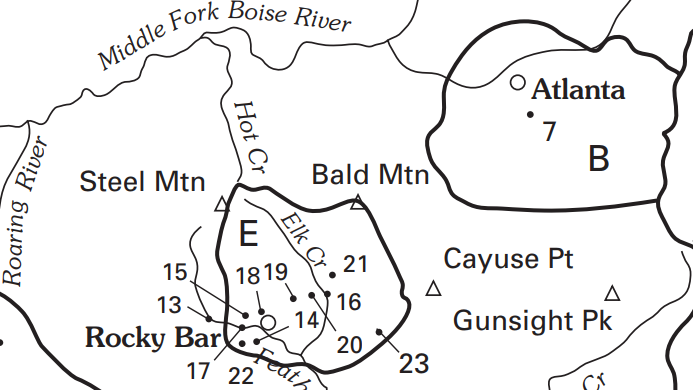
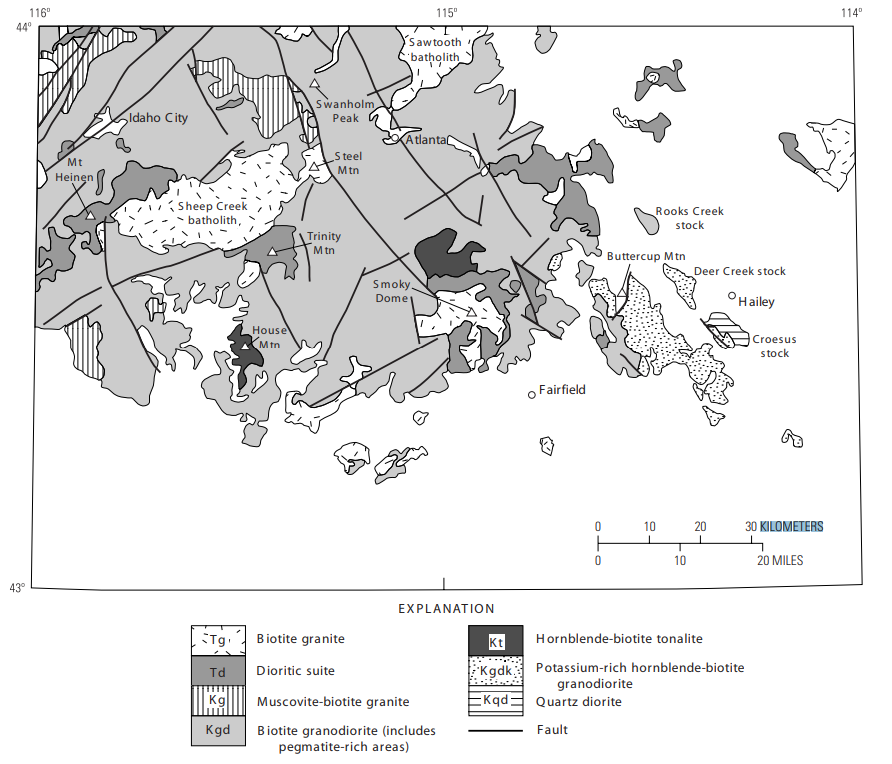
Rocky Bar mine locations (left) and geological map (right)

Rocky Bar is a ghost town in Elmore County, Idaho, United States. At its height in the late 19th century Rocky Bar boasted a population of over 2,500 and served as county seat of Alturas County from 1864 to 1882. It was also the original county seat of Elmore County when it was created in 1889.

Rocky Bar was founded in December 1863 soon after gold was discovered along the nearby Feather River. Within two years it became the main settlement in the area and was even considered as a possible capital for Idaho Territory. Although the town was rebuilt after the 1892 fire, it began a slow decline. Rocky Bar has not had a permanent population since the 1960s.

Rocky Bar is located 62 miles northeast of Mountain Home. A ten-mile square area including Rocky Bar, covering much of the large basin in which it is located, is listed on the National Register of Historic Places as South Boise Historic Mining District.

Originally a placer mining camp, the South Boise area of Rocky Bar and Atlanta had a population of 560 by 1863. Discovery of gold and silver lodes prompted the development of underground workings and 80 arastras by 1864. Stamp mills were in operation by 1865, later improved with a 50-stamp mill by 1887. Yet the ore bodies were relatively shallow, and production started to decline in 1889. The 1892 fire destroyed much of the town.

== See also ==
- Idaho Batholith
- Atlanta, Idaho
