= Atlanta Historic District =

Historic district in Idaho, United States

- U.S. National Register of Historic Places
- U.S. Historic district
- Location within Idaho Location within the United States
- Location: Quartz Creek, Pine and Main Sts., Atlanta, Idaho
- Coordinates: 43°48′7″N 115°7′42″W
- Area: 10 acres (4.0 ha)
- Built: 1876
- NRHP reference No.: 78001059
- Added to NRHP: April 6, 1978

The Atlanta Historic District in Atlanta in Elmore County, Idaho, is a 10 acres (4.0 ha) historic district listed on the National Register of Historic Places in 1978.

It covers parts of Quartz Creek, Pine and Main streets in Atlanta, which developed after the November 1864 discovery of the Atlanta lode of gold and silver discovered by John Simmons. The district included 12 contributing buildings when listed.

The district was deemed "significant as the only surviving section of nineteenth century Atlanta. Most all of the original town has been destroyed by fire, snow, or demolition." It included five houses, a log cabin, an assay office, a jail, and several outbuildings.

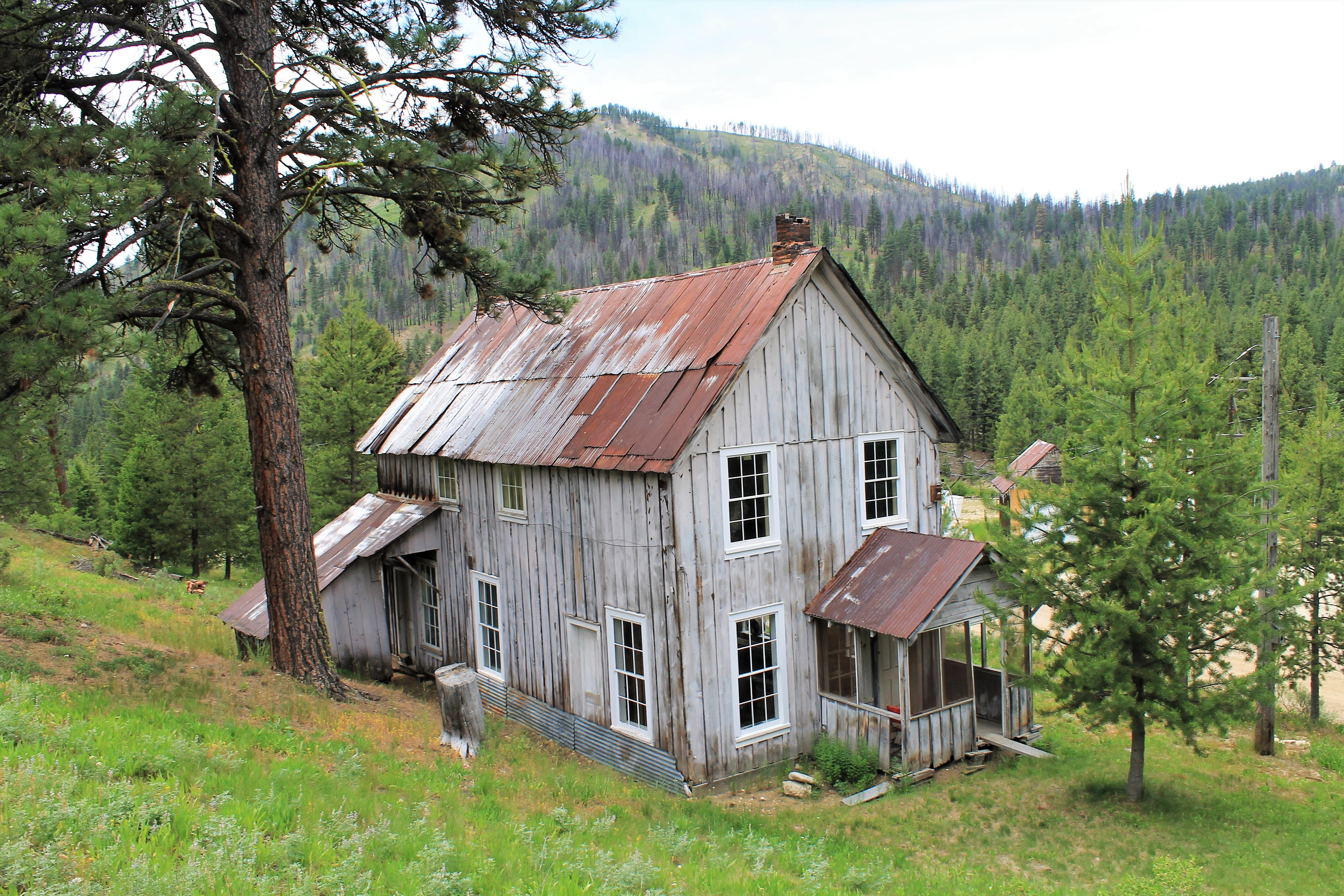
Historic Home in Atlanta, 2019
