= Mountain Home Carnegie Library =

- U.S. National Register of Historic Places
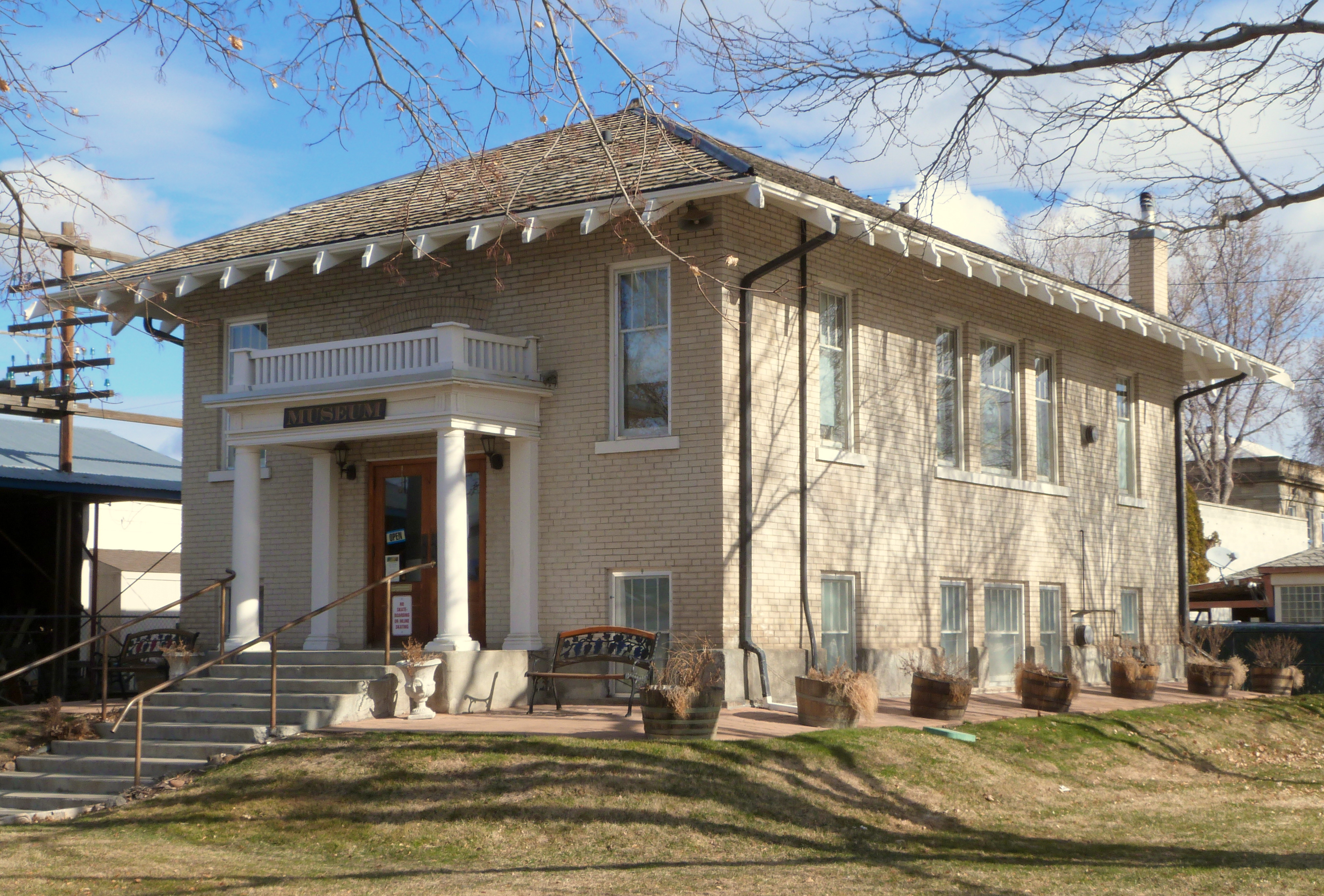

- Location within Idaho Location within the United States
- Location: 180 S. 3rd St. East, Mountain Home, Idaho
- Coordinates: 43°07′51″N 115°41′28″W
- Area: less than one acre
- Built: 1908
- Architect: Tourtelotte & Co.
- Architectural style: Western Colonial Revival
- NRHP reference No.: 78001061
- Added to NRHP: July 24, 1978

The Mountain Home Carnegie Library, at 180 S. 3rd St. East, in Mountain Home, Idaho, was built as a Carnegie library in 1908. It was listed on the National Register of Historic Places in 1978.

== History ==
It was built in 1908.

== Architecture ==
It was designed by the architectural firm of Tourtelotte & Co. It is a one-story white pressed brick building upon a raised cut stone foundation. It is "western colonial revival" in style. It has a Tuscan-columned portico with a corniced entablature topped by a balustrade. It has a bracketed, overhanging hipped roof.
