= Celebration Park =

Coordinates: 43.299°N 116.523°W

Location in the United States
Location in Idaho

Celebration Park is an archaeological park in the western United States, located in southwestern Idaho. It is the state's first archeological park and is adjacent to the Snake River near Melba and Walter's Ferry in Canyon County.

It features camping, restrooms, drinking water, picnicking, guided tours, and interpretive programs as well as fishing and access to hiking trails and the Snake River with a small day use fee. The elevation of the river at the park is approximately 2,250 feet (690 m) above sea level.

== History ==
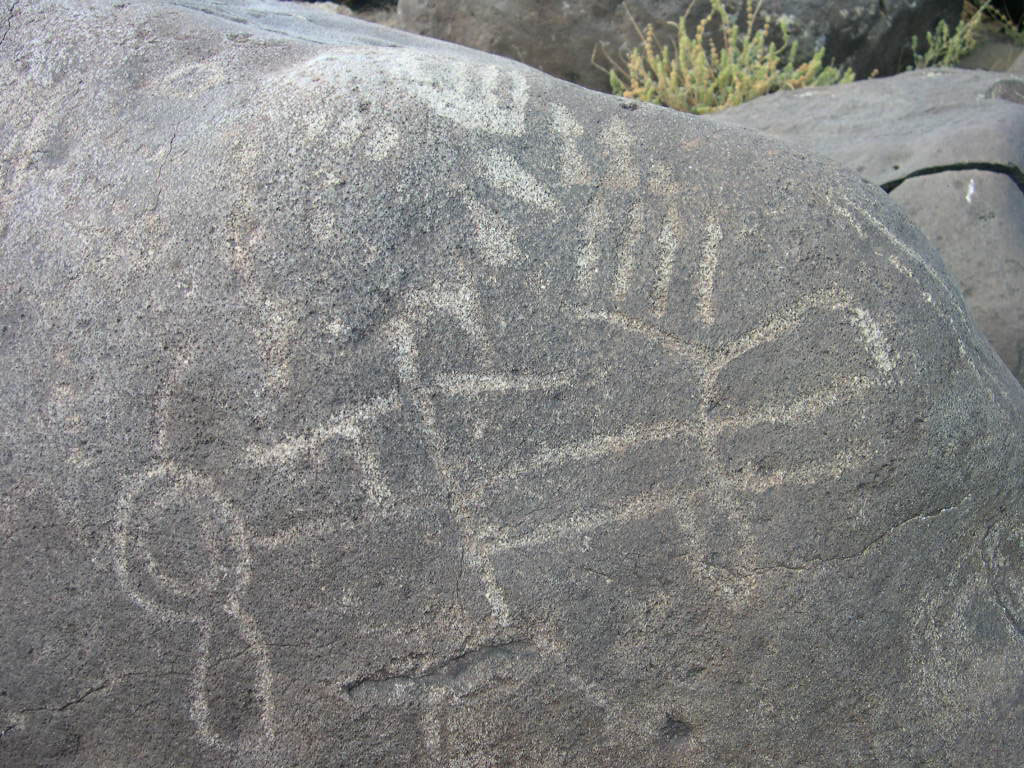
Petroglyph on basalt boulder along Snake River in Idaho

This park features in-situ petroglyphs, rock carvings made by Native Americans, some of which date to more than 12,000 years ago. Celebration Park was once a seasonal home for several nomadic groups. During the winter, the Paiute lived in areas with lower elevations along the Snake River including this site. This region was also home to the Shoshone and Bannock people.

The park's Guffey railroad bridge over the Snake River was built 128 years ago in 1897, to carry gold and silver ore from Silver City in the Owyhee mountains to Nampa for smelting. It has been refurbished and is open for walking and horseback riding. It is the only Parker-Through-Truss railroad bridge in Idaho and is the state's largest historic artifact; it was entered into the National Register of Historic Places in 1978. The 450-ton steel structure is 70 feet (21 m) tall and spans 500 feet (150 m) over the river. The bridge was abandoned 78 years ago in 1947, saved from demolition in the 1970s, and purchased and restored by Canyon County government in 1989.

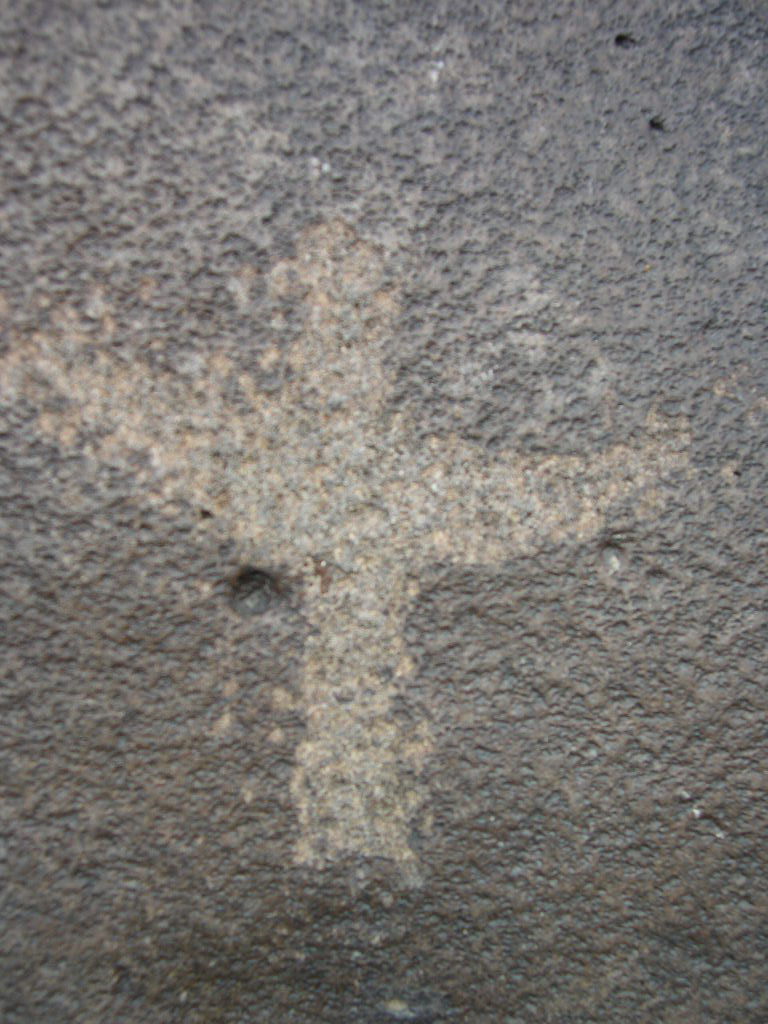
A "newer" (end of the 19th century) petroglyph on basalt boulder along Snake River in Idaho depicting a cross or possibly a bird.

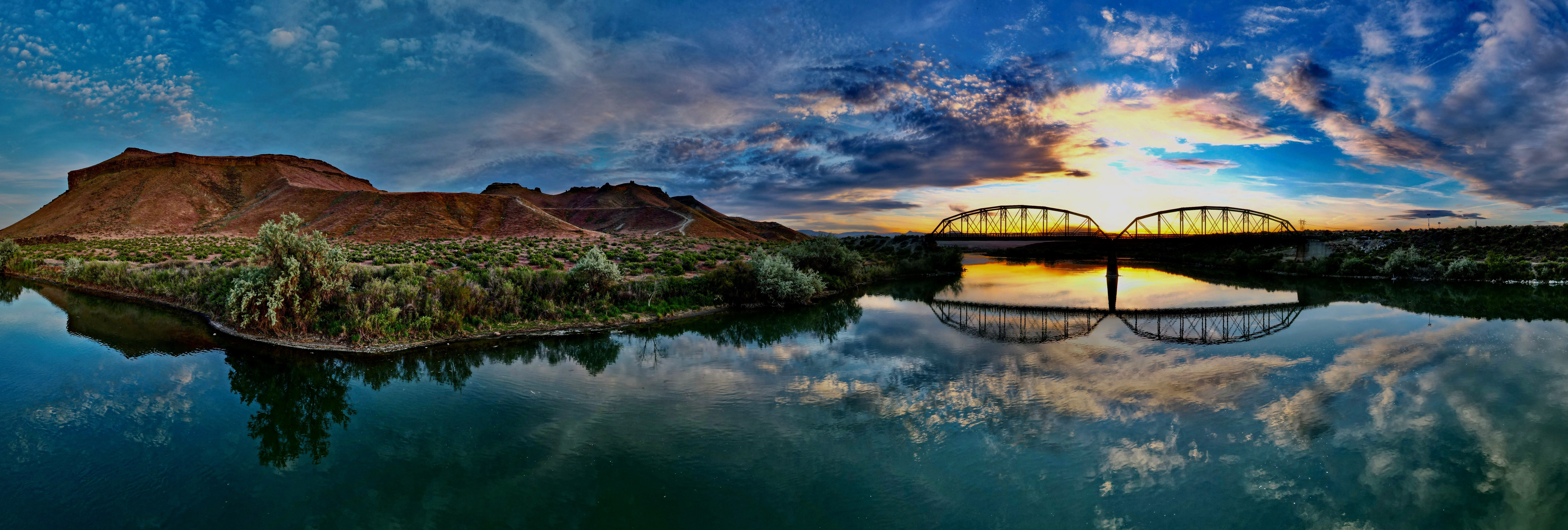

The park is within the Guffey Butte–Black Butte Archeological District, listed on the National Register of Historic Places.
