= Glenns Ferry, Idaho =

- City
- Location of Glenns Ferry in Elmore County, Idaho.
- Coordinates: 42°57′01″N 115°18′28″W
- Country: United States
- State: Idaho
- County: Elmore

Area
  - Total: 1.98 sq mi (5.14 km^{2})
  - Land: 1.96 sq mi (5.07 km^{2})
  - Water: 0.027 sq mi (0.07 km^{2})
- Elevation: 2,553 ft (778 m)

Population (2020)
  - Total: 1,282
  - Estimate (2022): 1,293
  - Density: 648.5/sq mi (250.39/km^{2})
- Time zone: UTC-7 (Mountain (MST))
  - Summer (DST): UTC-6 (MDT)
- ZIP codes: 83623, 83633
- Area code: 208
- FIPS code: 16-31690
- GNIS feature ID: 2410603
- Website: glennsferryidaho.org

Glenns Ferry is a city in Elmore County, Idaho, United States. The population was 1,293 at the 2020 census. The city is adjacent to Interstate 84 and the Snake River.

== History ==
Glenns Ferry was one of the most famous and treacherous river crossings on the Oregon Trail. Pioneers forded the Snake River at the Three Island Crossing until 1869, when Gustavus "Gus" Glenn constructed a ferry about two miles upstream, primarily to expedite freight but also for emigrants. His boat, which could hold two wagons, cut nearly twenty miles from the former route. In 1871 the city of Glenns Ferry was established. Construction of the Oregon Short Line Railroad through the town in 1883 gave the city its first major employer.

Opened in 1971, Three Island Crossing State Park is home to The Oregon Trail History and Education Center, where visitors can learn about pioneer emigrants and Native American history. The Glenns Ferry community sponsors a crossing commemoration the second Saturday of each August.

The Glenns Ferry townsite was platted 155 years ago in 1871, just downstream from the ferry site. It is one of just two incorporated cities in Elmore County, along with Mountain Home.

== Geography ==
According to the United States Census Bureau, the city has a total area of 1.94 square miles (5.02 km^{2}), of which, 1.92 square miles (4.97 km^{2}) is land and 0.02 square miles (0.05 km^{2}) is water.

=== Climate ===
Climate data for Glenns Ferry, Idaho, 1991–2020 normals, extremes 1905–present
Month	Jan	Feb	Mar	Apr	May	Jun	Jul	Aug	Sep	Oct	Nov	Dec	Year
Record high °F (°C)	85 (29)	73 (23)	90 (32)	97 (36)	108 (42)	114 (46)	115 (46)	112 (44)	109 (43)	96 (36)	81 (27)	75 (24)	115 (46)
Mean maximum °F (°C)	54.4 (12.4)	61.7 (16.5)	72.6 (22.6)	84.6 (29.2)	94.2 (34.6)	101.6 (38.7)	108.2 (42.3)	106.3 (41.3)	99.0 (37.2)	88.3 (31.3)	68.6 (20.3)	56.9 (13.8)	108.8 (42.7)
Mean daily maximum °F (°C)	43.7 (6.5)	50.2 (10.1)	60.3 (15.7)	67.9 (19.9)	78.5 (25.8)	87.9 (31.1)	97.0 (36.1)	95.1 (35.1)	84.3 (29.1)	70.3 (21.3)	55.1 (12.8)	41.9 (5.5)	69.4 (20.8)
Daily mean °F (°C)	33.9 (1.1)	37.9 (3.3)	45.7 (7.6)	52.4 (11.3)	61.6 (16.4)	70.3 (21.3)	77.9 (25.5)	75.3 (24.1)	65.6 (18.7)	52.9 (11.6)	41.0 (5.0)	34.2 (1.2)	54.1 (12.3)
Mean daily minimum °F (°C)	22.9 (−5.1)	25.6 (−3.6)	30.1 (−1.1)	35.5 (1.9)	42.5 (5.8)	51.6 (10.9)	56.6 (13.7)	53.7 (12.1)	44.1 (6.7)	35.0 (1.7)	26.8 (−2.9)	21.5 (−5.8)	37.2 (2.9)
Mean minimum °F (°C)	7.3 (−13.7)	12.0 (−11.1)	18.4 (−7.6)	23.4 (−4.8)	29.7 (−1.3)	37.5 (3.1)	45.2 (7.3)	42.1 (5.6)	31.8 (−0.1)	21.1 (−6.1)	12.3 (−10.9)	8.0 (−13.3)	0.9 (−17.3)
Record low °F (°C)	−23 (−31)	−16 (−27)	4 (−16)	14 (−10)	19 (−7)	26 (−3)	33 (1)	31 (−1)	15 (−9)	8 (−13)	−9 (−23)	−28 (−33)	−28 (−33)
Average precipitation inches (mm)	1.50 (38)	0.82 (21)	1.01 (26)	0.89 (23)	1.07 (27)	0.71 (18)	0.23 (5.8)	0.28 (7.1)	0.44 (11)	0.98 (25)	1.11 (28)	1.56 (40)	10.60 (269)
Average snowfall inches (cm)	2.1 (5.3)	0.5 (1.3)	0.2 (0.51)	0.0 (0.0)	0.0 (0.0)	0.0 (0.0)	0.0 (0.0)	0.0 (0.0)	0.0 (0.0)	0.0 (0.0)	0.3 (0.76)	1.5 (3.8)	4.6 (11.67)
Average snowy days (≥ 0.1 in)	1.1	0.4	0.1	0.0	0.0	0.0	0.0	0.0	0.0	0.0	0.3	1.0	2.9
Source 1: NOAA
Source 2: XMACIS2

== Demographics ==
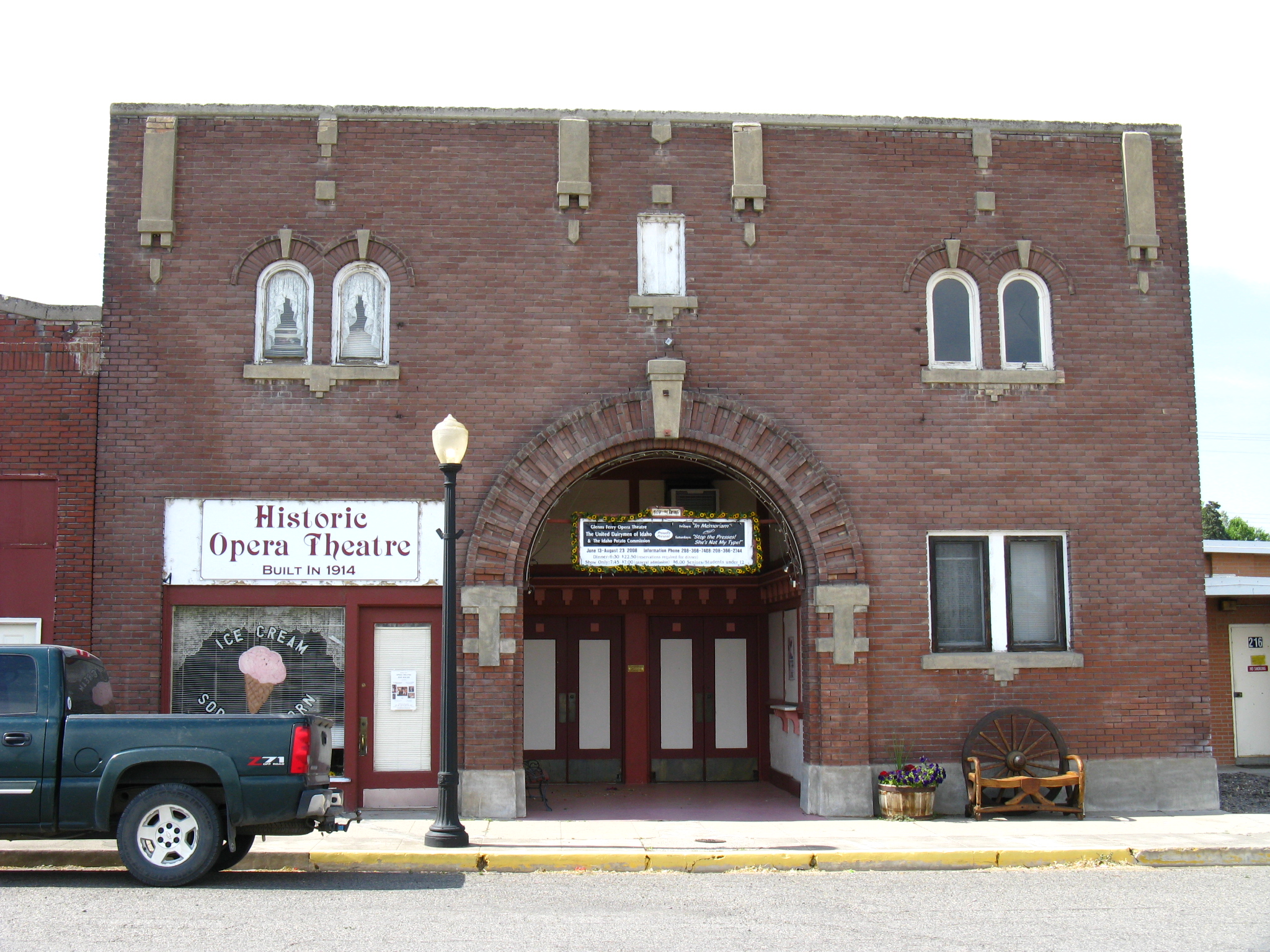
The Gorby Opera Theatre is one of six sites in Glenns Ferry listed on the National Register of Historic Places.

Historical population
Census	Pop.	Note	%±
1890	333		—
1910	800		—
1920	1,243		55.4%
1930	1,414		13.8%
1940	1,290		−8.8%
1950	1,515		17.4%
1960	1,374		−9.3%
1970	1,386		0.9%
1980	1,374		−0.9%
1990	1,304		−5.1%
2000	1,611		23.5%
2010	1,319		−18.1%
2020	1,282		−2.8%
2019 (est.)	1,303		−1.2%
U.S. Decennial Census

=== 2020 census ===
As of the 2020 census, Glenns Ferry had a population of 1,282. The median age was 45.8 years. 23.3% of residents were under the age of 18 and 24.4% of residents were 65 years of age or older. For every 100 females there were 95.4 males, and for every 100 females age 18 and over there were 88.0 males age 18 and over.

0.0% of residents lived in urban areas, while 100.0% lived in rural areas.

There were 548 households in Glenns Ferry, of which 29.4% had children under the age of 18 living in them. Of all households, 43.2% were married-couple households, 20.1% were households with a male householder and no spouse or partner present, and 31.6% were households with a female householder and no spouse or partner present. About 31.6% of all households were made up of individuals and 16.2% had someone living alone who was 65 years of age or older.

There were 633 housing units, of which 13.4% were vacant. The homeowner vacancy rate was 2.6% and the rental vacancy rate was 2.8%.

Racial composition as of the 2020 census
Race	Number	Percent
White	998	77.8%
Black or African American	1	0.1%
American Indian and Alaska Native	13	1.0%
Asian	4	0.3%
Native Hawaiian and Other Pacific Islander	2	0.2%
Some other race	159	12.4%
Two or more races	105	8.2%
Hispanic or Latino (of any race)	280	21.8%

=== 2010 census ===
As of the census of 2010, there were 1,319 people, 559 households, and 350 families residing in the city. The population density was 687.0 inhabitants per square mile (265.3/km^{2}). There were 684 housing units at an average density of 356.3 per square mile (137.6/km^{2}). The racial makeup of the city was 82.2% White, 0.2% African American, 2.0% Native American, 0.4% Asian, 11.8% from other races, and 3.4% from two or more races. Hispanic or Latino of any race were 24.6% of the population.

There were 559 households, of which 27.9% had children under the age of 18 living with them, 48.5% were married couples living together, 10.4% had a female householder with no husband present, 3.8% had a male householder with no wife present, and 37.4% were non-families. 32.6% of all households were made up of individuals, and 18.1% had someone living alone who was 65 years of age or older. The average household size was 2.36 and the average family size was 3.00.

The median age in the city was 42.6 years. 25.6% of residents were under the age of 18; 6.4% were between the ages of 18 and 24; 20.3% were from 25 to 44; 24.8% were from 45 to 64; and 23% were 65 years of age or older. The gender makeup of the city was 49.1% male and 50.9% female.

=== 2000 census ===
As of the census of 2000, there were 1,611 people, 610 households, and 428 families residing in the city. The population density was 920.2 inhabitants per square mile (355.3/km^{2}). There were 707 housing units at an average density of 403.8 per square mile (155.9/km^{2}). The racial makeup of the city was 85.41% White, 1.18% Native American, 0.31% Asian, 9.75% from other races, and 3.35% from two or more races. Hispanic or Latino of any race were 26.44% of the population.

There were 610 households, out of which 34.3% had children under the age of 18 living with them, 56.2% were married couples living together, 10.0% had a female householder with no husband present, and 29.7% were non-families. 26.7% of all households were made up of individuals, and 13.4% had someone living alone who was 65 years of age or older. The average household size was 2.64 and the average family size was 3.21.

In the city, the population was spread out, with 32.4% under the age of 18, 6.3% from 18 to 24, 23.0% from 25 to 44, 21.8% from 45 to 64, and 16.4% who were 65 years of age or older. The median age was 36 years. For every 100 females, there were 103.2 males. For every 100 females age 18 and over, there were 93.4 males.

The median income for a household in the city was $26,379, and the median income for a family was $32,019. Males had a median income of $27,321 versus $17,692 for females. The per capita income for the city was $12,869. About 20.5% of families and 24.5% of the population were below the poverty line, including 38.4% of those under age 18 and 6.3% of those age 65 or over.

== Education ==
It is in the Glenns Ferry Joint School District 192.

== Notable people ==
- Korey Hall, American football player
- Kitty Wilkins, horse breeder
- Richard Wills, Idaho State Representative

== Gallery ==
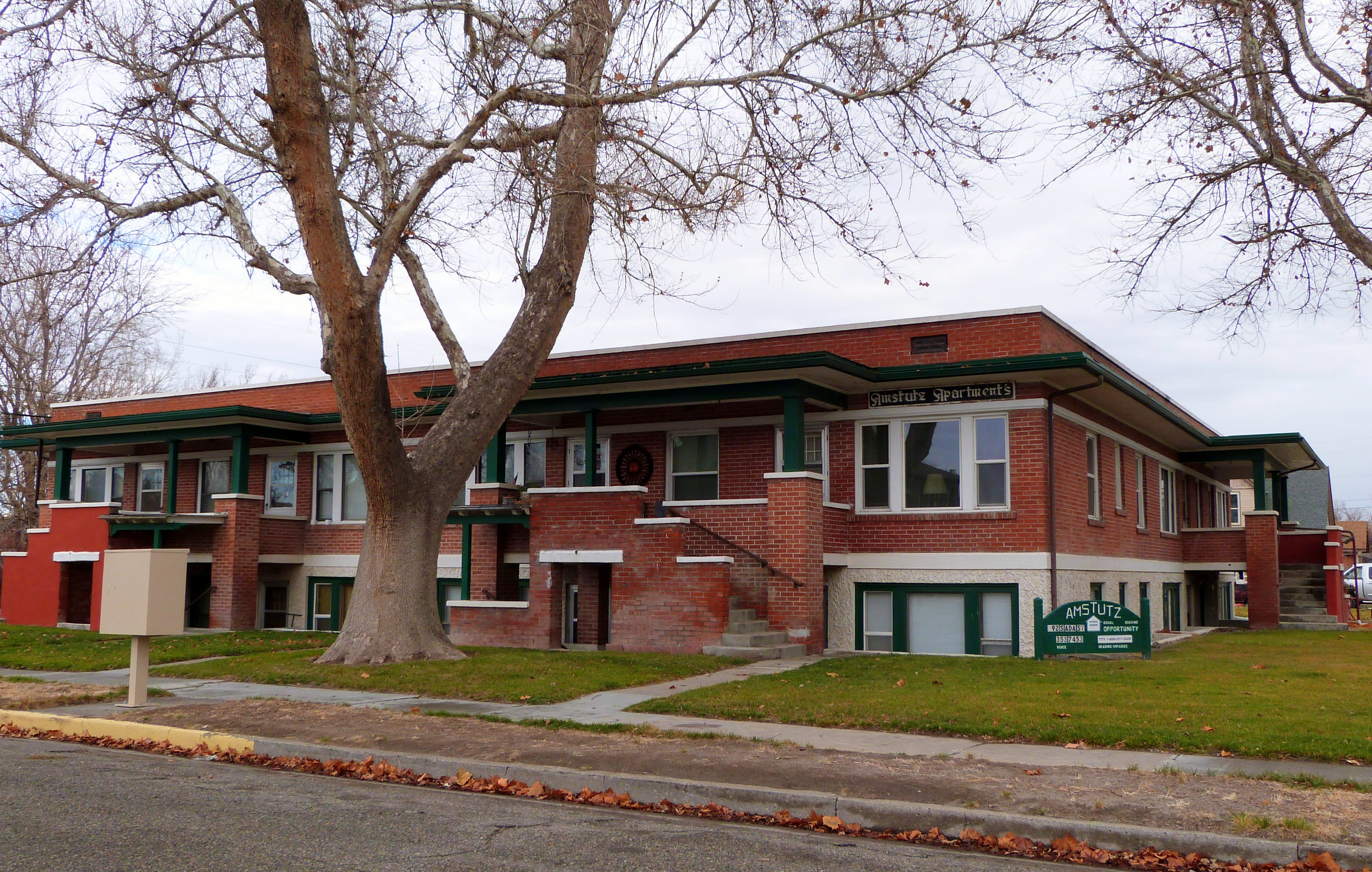
Amstutz Apartments

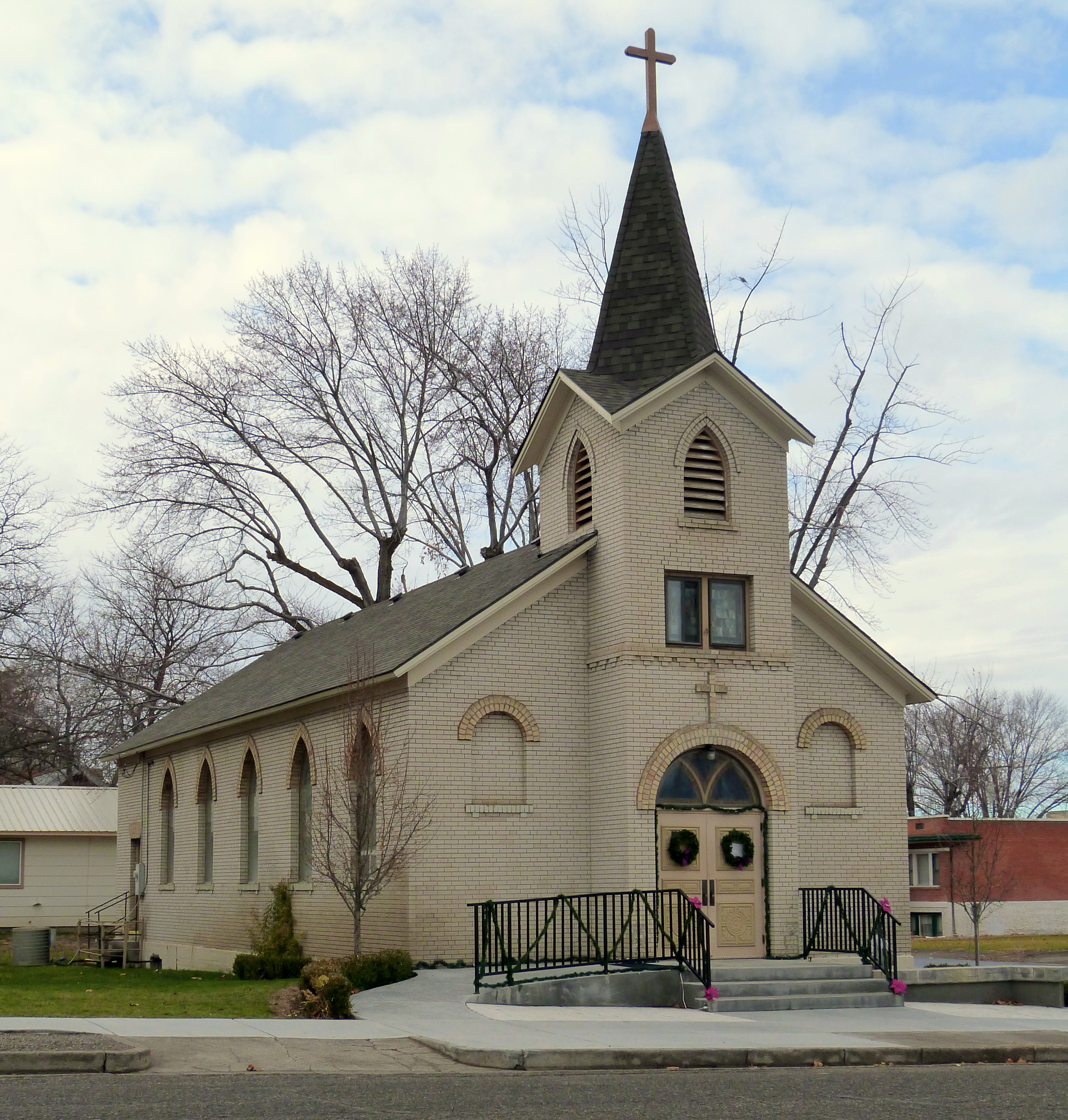
Our Lady of Limerick Catholic Church

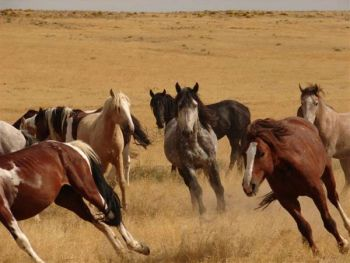
Wild horses at Saylor Creek south of Glenns Ferry

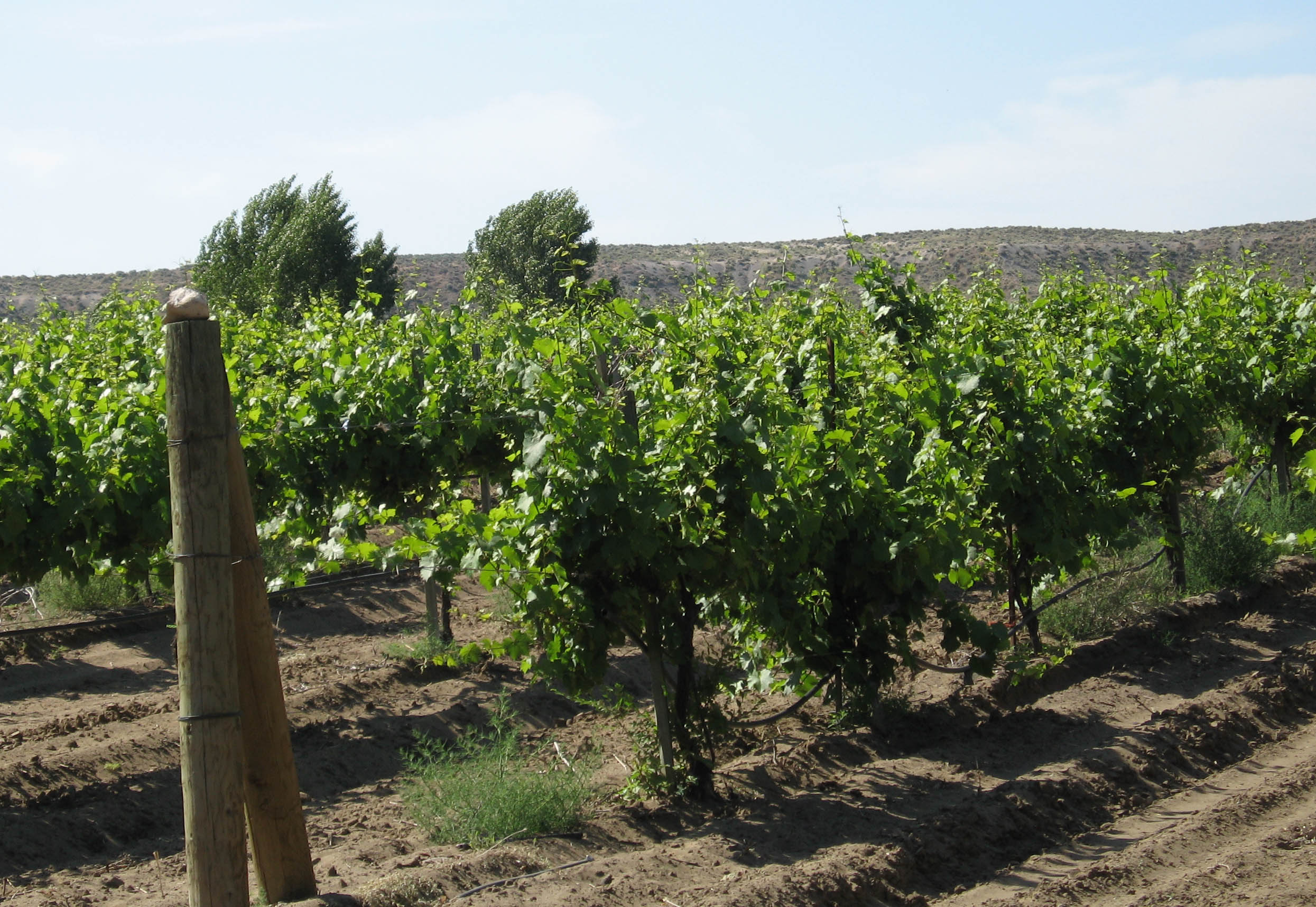
Vineyard outside Glenns Ferry
