= List of high schools in Idaho =

Idaho High Schools, List

This is a list of high schools in the U.S. state of Idaho.

== Alphabetical list ==
- Aberdeen High School, Aberdeen
- Alturas Prep, Idaho Falls
- American Falls High School, American Falls
- Bear Lake High School, Montpelier
- Bishop Kelly High School, Boise
- Black Canyon High School, Emmett
- Blackfoot High School, Blackfoot
- Bliss High School, Bliss
- Boise High School, Boise
- Bonners Ferry High School, Bonners Ferry
- Bonneville High School, Idaho Falls
- Borah High School, Boise
- Buhl High School, Buhl
- Burley High School, Burley
- Butte County High School, Arco
- Caldwell High School, Caldwell
- Camas County High School, Fairfield
- Cambridge High School, Cambridge
- Canyon Springs High School, Caldwell
- Canyon Ridge High School, Twin Falls
- Capital High School, Boise
- Carey High School, Carey
- Cascade High School, Cascade
- Castleford High School, Castleford
- Centennial High School, Boise
- Century High School, Pocatello
- Challis High School, Challis
- Clark County High School, Dubois
- Clark Fork Junior/Senior High School, Clark Fork
- Clearwater Valley High School, Kooskia
- Coeur d'Alene Charter Academy, Coeur d'Alene
- Coeur d'Alene High School, Coeur d'Alene
- Coeur du Christ Academy, Coeur d'Alene
- Cole Valley Christian High School, Meridian
- Columbia High School, Nampa
- Community School, Sun Valley
- Compass Academy, Idaho Falls
- Compass Public Charter School, Meridian
- Council High School, Council
- Culdesac High School, Culdesac
- Deary High School, Deary
- Declo High School, Declo
- Dietrich High School, Dietrich
- Eagle Academy, Eagle
- Eagle High School, Eagle
- Emmett High School, Emmett
- Filer High School, Filer
- Firth High School, Firth
- Frank Church High School, Boise
- Fruitland High School, Fruitland
- Garden Valley High School, Garden Valley
- Gem State Adventist Academy, Caldwell
- Genesee High School, Genesee
- Glenns Ferry High School, Glenns Ferry
- Gooding High School, Gooding
- Grace High School, Grace
- Grangeville High School, Grangeville
- Greenleaf Friends Academy, Greenleaf
- Hagerman High School, Hagerman
- Hansen High School, Hansen
- Highland High School, Craigmont
- Highland High School, Pocatello
- Hillcrest High School, Ammon
- Homedale High School, Homedale
- Horseshoe Bend High School, Horseshoe Bend
- Idaho Arts Charter School, Nampa
- Idaho City High School, Idaho City
- Idaho Connects Online School, Statewide
- Idaho Falls High School, Idaho Falls
- Idaho Leadership Academy, Blackfoot
- Idaho School for the Deaf and the Blind, Gooding
- Idaho Stem Academy, Blackfoot
- Initial Point High School, Kuna
- iSucceed Virtual High School, Statewide
- Jerome High School, Jerome
- Kamiah High School, Kamiah
- Kellogg High School, Kellogg
- Kendrick High School, Kendrick
- Kimberly High School, Kimberly
- Kootenai Junior/Senior High School, Harrison
- Kuna High School, Kuna
- Lake City High School, Coeur d'Alene
- Lakeland High School, Rathdrum
- Lakeside High School, Plummer
- Lapwai High School, Lapwai
- Leadore High School, Leadore
- Lewiston High School, Lewiston
- Liberty Charter School, Nampa
- Lighthouse Christian School, Twin Falls
- Logos School, Moscow
- Mackay High School, Mackay
- Madison High School, Rexburg
- Magic Valley Christian School, Jerome
- Magic Valley Christian School, Twin Falls
- Magic Valley High School, Twin Falls
- Malad High School, Malad City
- Marsh Valley High School, Arimo
- Marsing High School, Marsing
- McCall-Donnelly High School, McCall
- Meadows Valley Junior/Senior High School, New Meadows
- Melba High School, Melba
- Meridian Academy, Meridian
- Meridian High School, Meridian
- Meridian Medical Arts Charter High School, Meridian
- Meridian Technical Charter High School, Meridian
- Middleton High School, Middleton
- Midvale High School, Midvale
- Minico High School, Rupert
- Moscow High School, Moscow
- Mountain Home High School, Mountain Home
- Mountain View High School, Meridian
- Mullan High School, Mullan
- Murtaugh High School, Murtaugh
- Nampa Christian School, Nampa
- Nampa High School, Nampa
- New Plymouth High School, New Plymouth
- Nezperce High School, Nezperce
- North Fremont High School, Ashton
- North Gem High School, Bancroft
- North Idaho Christian School, Hayden
- North Star Charter School, Eagle
- Notus High School, Notus
- Oakley High School, Oakley
- Orofino High School, Orofino
- Owyhee High School, Meridian
- Parma High School, Parma
- Payette High School, Payette
- Pocatello High School, Pocatello
- Post Falls Christian Academy, Post Falls
- Post Falls High School, Post Falls
- Potlatch High School, Potlatch
- Prairie High School, Cottonwood
- Preston High School, Preston
- Priest River Lamanna High School, Priest River
- Raft River High School, Malta
- Renaissance High School, Meridian
- Richfield High School, Richfield
- Ridgevue High School, Nampa
- Rigby High School, Rigby
- Rimrock High School, Bruneau
- Ririe High School, Ririe
- Riverstone International School, Boise
- Rockland High School, Rockland
- Rocky Mountain High School, Meridian
- Sage International School of Boise, Boise
- Salmon High School, Salmon
- Salmon River High School, Riggins
- Sandpoint High School, Sandpoint
- Shelley High School, Shelley
- Shoshone-Bannock Jr./Sr. High School, Fort Hall
- Shoshone High School, Shoshone
- Skyline High School, Idaho Falls
- Skyview High School, Nampa
- Snake River High School, Blackfoot
- Soda Springs High School, Soda Springs
- South Fremont High School, St. Anthony
- St. John Bosco Academy, Cottonwood
- St. Maries High School, St. Maries
- Sugar-Salem High School, Sugar City
- Taylor's Crossing Public Charter School, Idaho Falls
- Teton High School, Driggs
- The Ambrose School, Meridian
- Thomas Jefferson Charter School, Caldwell
- Thunder Ridge High School, Idaho Falls
- Timberlake High School, Spirit Lake
- Timberline High School, Boise
- Timberline High School, Weippe
- Troy High School, Troy
- Twin Falls Christian Academy, Twin Falls
- Twin Falls High School, Twin Falls
- Valley High School, Hazelton
- Vallivue High School, Caldwell
- Victory Charter School, Nampa
- Wallace High School, Wallace
- Weiser High School, Weiser
- Wendell High School, Wendell
- West Jefferson High School, Terreton
- West Side High School, Dayton
- Wilder High School, Wilder
- Wood River High School, Hailey
- Xavier Charter School, Twin Falls

== Schools by county ==
=== Ada County ===
- Bishop Kelly High School, Boise
- Boise High School, Boise
- Borah High School, Boise
- Capital High School, Boise 5A
- Centennial High School, Boise
- Cole Valley Christian High School, Meridian
- Compass Public Charter School, Meridian
- Eagle Academy, Eagle
- Eagle High School, Eagle
- Frank Church High School, Boise
- Initial Point High School, Kuna
- Kuna High School, Kuna
- Meridian Academy, Meridian
- Meridian High School, Meridian 5A
- Meridian Medical Arts Charter High School, Meridian
- Meridian Technical Charter High School, Meridian
- Mountain View High School, Meridian 5A
- North Star Charter School, Eagle
- Owyhee High School, Meridian
- Renaissance High School, Meridian
- Riverstone International School, Boise
- Rocky Mountain High School, Meridian
- Sage International School, Boise
- The Ambrose School, Meridian
- Timberline High School, Boise

=== Adams County ===
- Council High School, Council
- Meadows Valley Junior/Senior High School, New Meadows

=== Bannock County ===
- Pocatello High School, Pocatello
- Highland High School, Pocatello
- Century High School, Pocatello
- Marsh Valley High School, Arimo

=== Bear Lake County ===
- Bear Lake High School, Montpelier

=== Benewah County ===
- Lakeside High School, Plummer
- St. Maries High School, St. Maries

=== Bingham County ===
- Aberdeen High School, Aberdeen
- Blackfoot High School, Blackfoot
- Firth High School, Firth
- Idaho Leadership Academy, Blackfoot
- Shelley High School, Shelley
- Sho-Ban School, Fort Hall
- Snake River High School, Blackfoot

=== Blaine County ===
- Carey High School, Carey
- Community School, Sun Valley
- Wood River High School, Hailey

=== Boise County ===
- Garden Valley High School, Garden Valley
- Horseshoe Bend High School, Horseshoe Bend
- Idaho City High School, Idaho City

=== Bonner County ===
- Clark Fork Junior/Senior High School, Clark Fork
- Priest River Lamanna High School, Priest River
- Sandpoint High School, Sandpoint

=== Bonneville County ===
- Alturas Prep, Idaho Falls
- Bonneville High School, Idaho Falls 5A
- Compass Academy, Idaho Falls
- Hillcrest High School, Ammon
- Idaho Falls High School, Idaho Falls 5A
- Skyline High School, Idaho Falls5A
- Taylor's Crossing Public Charter School, Idaho Falls
- Thunder Ridge High School, Idaho Falls 5A

=== Boundary County ===
- Bonners Ferry High School, Bonners Ferry

=== Butte County ===
- Butte County High School, Arco

=== Camas County ===
- Camas County High School, Fairfield

=== Canyon County ===
- Caldwell High School, Caldwell
- Canyon Springs High School, Caldwell
- Columbia High School, Nampa
- Gem State Adventist Academy, Caldwell
- Greenleaf Friends Academy, Greenleaf
- Idaho Arts Charter School, Nampa
- Liberty Charter School, Nampa
- Melba High School, Melba
- Middleton High School, Middleton
- Nampa High School, Nampa
- Nampa Christian School, Nampa
- Notus High School, Notus
- Parma High School, Parma
- Ridgevue High School, Nampa
- Skyview High School, Nampa
- Thomas Jefferson Charter School, Caldwell
- Vallivue High School, Caldwell
- Victory Charter School, Nampa
- Wilder High School, Wilder

=== Caribou County ===
- Grace High School, Grace
- North Gem High School, Bancroft
- Soda Springs High School, Soda Springs

=== Cassia County ===
- Burley High School, Burley
- Declo High School, Declo
- Oakley High School, Oakley
- Raft River High School, Malta

=== Clark County ===
- Clark County High School, Dubois

=== Clearwater County ===
- Orofino High School, Orofino
- Timberline High School, Weippe

=== Custer County ===
- Challis High School, Challis
- Mackay High School, Mackay

=== Elmore County ===
- Glenns Ferry High School, Glenns Ferry
- Mountain Home High School, Mountain Home

=== Franklin County ===
- Preston High School, Preston
- West Side High School, Dayton

=== Fremont County ===
- North Fremont High School, Ashton
- South Fremont High School, St. Anthony

=== Gem County ===
- Black Canyon High School, Emmett
- Emmett High School, Emmett

=== Gooding County ===
- Bliss High School, Bliss
- Gooding High School, Gooding
- Hagerman High School, Hagerman
- Idaho School for the Deaf and the Blind, Gooding
- Wendell High School, Wendell

=== Idaho County ===
- Clearwater Valley High School, Kooskia
- Grangeville High School, Grangeville
- Prairie High School, Cottonwood
- Salmon River High School, Riggins
- St. John Bosco Academy, Cottonwood

=== Jefferson County ===
- Rigby High School, Rigby 5A
- Ririe High School, Ririe
- West Jefferson High School, Terreton

=== Jerome County ===
- Jerome High School, Jerome
- Valley High School, Hazelton

=== Kootenai County ===
- Coeur d'Alene Charter Academy, Coeur d'Alene
- Coeur d'Alene High School, Coeur d'Alene 5A
- Coeur du Christ Academy, Coeur d'Alene
- Kootenai High School, Harrison
- Lake City High School, Coeur d'Alene 5A
- Lakeland High School, Rathdrum
- North Idaho Christian School, Hayden
- Post Falls Christian Academy, Post Falls
- Post Falls High School, Post Falls 5A
- Timberlake High School, Spirit Lake

=== Latah County ===
- Deary High School, Deary
- Genesee High School, Genesee
- Kendrick High School, Kendrick
- Logos School, Moscow
- Moscow High School, Moscow
- Potlatch High School, Potlatch
- Troy High School, Troy

=== Lemhi County ===
- Leadore High School, Leadore
- Salmon High School, Salmon

=== Lewis County ===
- Highland High School, Craigmont
- Kamiah High School, Kamiah
- Nezperce High School, Nezperce

=== Lincoln County ===
- Dietrich High School, Dietrich
- Richfield High School, Richfield
- Shoshone High School, Shoshone

=== Madison County ===
- Madison High School, Rexburg 5A
- Sugar-Salem High School, Sugar City

=== Minidoka County ===
- Minico High School, Rupert

=== Nez Perce County ===
- Culdesac High School, Culdesac
- Lapwai High School, Lapwai
- Lewiston High School, Lewiston 5A

=== Oneida County ===
- Malad High School, Malad City

=== Owyhee County ===
- Homedale High School, Homedale
- Marsing High School, Marsing
- Rimrock High School, Bruneau

=== Payette County ===
- Fruitland High School, Fruitland
- New Plymouth High School, New Plymouth
- Payette High School, Payette

=== Power County ===
- American Falls High School, American Falls
- Rockland High School, Rockland

=== Shoshone County ===
- Kellogg High School, Kellogg
- Mullan High School, Mullan
- Wallace High School, Wallace

=== Teton County ===
- Teton High School, Driggs

=== Twin Falls County ===
- Buhl High School, Buhl
- Canyon Ridge High School, Twin Falls
- Castleford High School, Castleford
- Filer High School, Filer
- Hansen High School, Hansen
- Kimberly High School, Kimberly
- Lighthouse Christian School, Twin Falls
- Magic Valley Christian School, Twin Falls (closed)
- Magic Valley High School, Twin Falls
- Murtaugh High School, Murtaugh
- Twin Falls Christian Academy, Twin Falls
- Twin Falls High School, Twin Falls
- Xavier Charter School, Twin Falls

=== Valley County ===
- Cascade High School, Cascade
- McCall-Donnelly High School, McCall

=== Washington County ===
- Cambridge High School, Cambridge
- Midvale High School, Midvale
- Weiser High School, Weiser

== See also ==
- List of school districts in Idaho
