= Snake River Valley Conference =

The Snake River Valley Conference (SRV) is a high school athletic conference in the Idaho High School Activities Association. The conference competes at the 3A level in all sports.

== 2018-20 Members ==
- Fruitland High School, Fruitland
- Homedale High School, Homedale
- Parma High School, Parma
- Payette High School, Payette
- Weiser High School, Weiser

== Former members ==
- Bishop Kelly High School, Boise (4A)
- Emmett High School, Emmett (4A)
- Kuna High School, Kuna (4A)
- McCall-Donnelly High School, McCall (2A)
- Middleton High School, Middleton (4A)
- Vallivue High School, Caldwell (4A)
