= List of charter schools in Idaho =

The following is a list of charter schools in Idaho (including networks of such schools) grouped by county.

== Ada County ==
- Anser Charter School
- Cardinal Academy
- Compass Public Charter School
- Doral Academy of Idaho
- Falcon Ridge Public Charter School
- Future Public Charter School
- Gem Prep: Boise
- Idaho Technical Career Academy
- Idaho Virtual Academy
- Inspire Connections Academy
- iSucceed Virtual High School
- Meridian Medical Arts Charter High School
- Meridian Technical Charter High School
- North Star Charter School
- Peace Valley Public Charter School
- Project Impact STEM Academy
- Rolling Hills Charter School
- Sage International School of Boise
- Village Leadership Academy

== Bannock County ==
- Chief Tahgee Elementary Academy
- Connor Academy
- Gem Prep: Moscow

== Bingham County ==
- Bingham Academy
- Blackfoot Charter Community Learning Center
- Idaho Science & Technology Charter School

== Blaine County ==
- Syringa Mountain School

== Bonner County ==
- Forrest M. Bird Charter School

== Bonneville County ==
- Alturas Preparatory Academy
- American Heritage Charter School
- Monticello Montessori School
- Taylor's Crossing Public Charter School
- White Pine Charter School

== Canyon County ==
- Another Choice Virtual Charter School
- Elevate Academy
- Forge International School
- Gem Prep: Caldwell
- Heritage Community Charter School
- Idaho Arts Charter School
- Idaho Connects Online School
- Legacy Charter School
- Liberty Charter School
- MOSAICS Public School
- Pathways in Education: Nampa
- Thomas Jefferson Charter School
- Victory Charter School
- Vision Charter School

== Elmore County ==
- Richard McKenna Charter School

== Franklin County ==
- Southeastern ID Technical Charter School

== Fremont County ==
- Island Park Charter School

== Gem County ==
- Payette River Technical Academy

== Gooding County ==
- North Valley Academy

== Jerome County ==
- Heritage Academy

== Kootenai County ==
- Coeur d'Alene Charter Academy
- Hayden Canyon Charter School
- Kootenai Bridge Academy
- North Idaho STEM Charter Academy

== Latah County ==
- Gem Prep: Online
- Moscow Charter School
- Palouse Prairie Charter School

== Lemhi County ==
- Fernwaters Public Charter School

== Payette County ==
- Treasure Valley Classical Academy

== Twin Falls County ==
- Pinecrest Academy of Idaho
- RISE Charter School
- Xavier Charter School
