= Kellogg High School =

Location
- 2 Jacobs Gulch Road; Kellogg, Idaho 83837; United States
- Coordinates: 47.551°N 116.128°W

Information
- Other name: KHS
- Type: Public high school
- Established: 1956
- School district: Kellogg School District #391
- NCES School ID: 160165000293
- Principal: Dan Davidian
- Teaching staff: 20.00 (FTE)
- Grades: 9–12
- Enrollment: 300 (2023-2024)
- Student to teacher ratio: 15.00
- Colors: Purple and gold
- Athletics conference: Central Idaho League
- Mascot: Wildcat
- Website: khs.kelloggschools.org

Kellogg High School (KHS) is a public high school in Kellogg, Idaho, United States. It was established in 1956 and is part of the Kellogg School District #391.

== History ==
Kellogg High School was built in 1956 for just under $1 million and was recognized nationally for its modern architecture. The original school was located in uptown Kellogg, near the south end of Main Street. Later the junior high, it was demolished in 1971 and is now the city's skate park.

== Athletics ==
The school competes in athletics in IHSAA Class 3A, in the Intermountain League with Bonners Ferry, Coeur d'Alene Charter Academy, Priest River, and Timberlake (of Spirit Lake). Excluding Coeur d'Alene Charter, these league members are all north of Coeur d'Alene; former member St. Maries dropped to 2A in 2012, but remains the unofficial primary rival. While Wallace High School remains the formal school rival. Kellogg's neighboring school districts have smaller high school enrollments and compete in Class 1A, in the North Star Conference. Until 1976, Kellogg competed with the largest schools in the state in Class A-1 (now 5A).

=== Rivalry ===
The school's primary rival is St. Maries High School, about 40 miles (64 km) to the southwest in Benewah County. The major school spirit competition between the two is called the "Brawl For The Ball." Begun in 2007, every level of basketball competes, and the schools also square off in a food drive, a dance-off, a cheerleading competition, and school spirit challenges. The winner receives a ball painted in both schools' colors and retains it for that year. In 2012, the respective school district superintendents had a friendly wager on the outcome of the boys' varsity basketball game; the loser had to wear the winner's jersey at the next superintendents' meeting.

=== State titles ===
Boys

- Basketball (4): (A, now 5A) 1955, 1956; (AAA, now 5A) 1959; (A-1, now 5A) 1964
- Golf (4): (3A) 2005, (3A) 2017, (3A) 2018, (3A) 2021

Girls

- Track (1): (A-2, now 3A) 1985 (introduced in 1971)
- Golf (2): (3A) 2013, (3A) 2016
