= Idaho High School Activities Association =

High school athletics organization

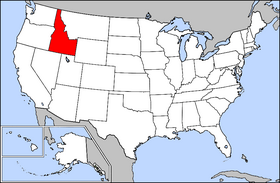
- Abbreviation: IHSAA
- Formation: 1925; 101 years ago
- Legal status: Association
- Purpose: Athletic / Educational
- Headquarters: 8011 Ustick Road; Boise, Idaho; 43.6337°N 116.2826°W
- Region served: Idaho
- Members: 171 high schools
- Executive Director: Chad Williams
- Assistant Directors: Julie Hammons; Mike Federico
- Affiliations: National Federation of State High School Associations
- Website: idhsaa.org

The Idaho High School Activities Association (IHSAA) oversees high school athletics and activities in the U.S. state of Idaho. Idaho high schools are classified in six categories, based on enrollment, for league competition and state playoffs and championships. The IHSAA recognizes twenty specific sports and activities.

Schools primarily compete within their own classification for regular season play, but are allowed to play other schools one classification above or below them in most sports.

== Classifications ==
IHSAA classifications are based on four-year enrollments (grades 9–12).
The classifications for the state's 171 high schools for 2026–28 are:

Classification	Enrollment (gr. 9–12)	Average per class year	Member schools
6A	1400 +	350 +	21
5A	700–1399	175–349	24
4A	350–699	88–174	20
3A	175–349	44–87	32
2A	90–174	23–43	37
1A	0–89	0–22	36
Total			171

=== Historic classifications ===
Years	6A	5A	4A	3A	2A	1A
2024–	6A	5A	4A	3A	2A	1A
2008–2024	5A	4A	3A	2A	1A (I)	1A (II)
2001–2008	5A	4A	3A	2A	1A (FB: I, II)	
2000–2001	A-1 (I)	A-1 (II)	A-2	A-3	A-4	
1984–2000	A-1 (FB: I, II)		A-2	A-3	A-4	
1963–1984	A-1		A-2	A-3	A-4	
1957–1963	AAA		AA		A	
1937–1957	A			B		
1917–1937	single classification					

- A-1 was split into two divisions for football in fall 1984, all sports in fall 2000
- 1A was two divisions for football only; two divisions for volleyball and basketball in fall 2008.

== Districts ==
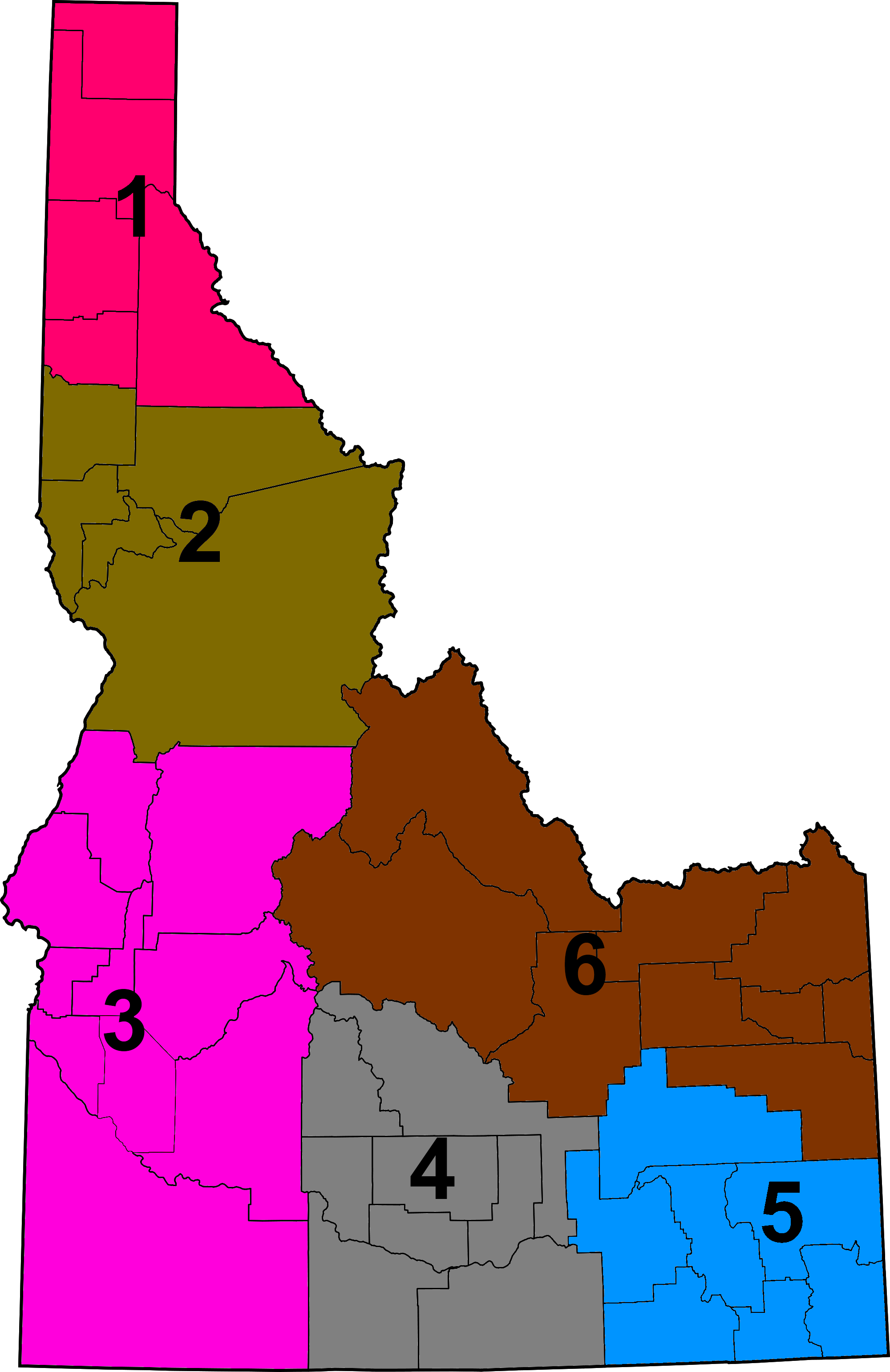
District map

District	Geographical area
I	North
II	North Central
III	Southwest
IV	South Central
V	Southeast
VI	East

The six districts correspond to those used by the state's transportation department.

== 6A Conferences ==
District I, (6A) - (North)

- Coeur d'Alene Vikings
- Lake City Timberwolves - Coeur d'Alene
- Post Falls Trojans

District III, (6A) - (Southwest)

- Boise Brave
- Borah Lions - Boise
- Capital Eagles - Boise
- Centennial Patriots - Boise, W. Ada S.D.
- Eagle Mustangs
- Kuna Kaveman
- Meridian Warriors
- Mountain View Mavericks - Meridian
- Nampa Bulldogs
- Owyhee Storm - Meridian
- Ridgevue Warhawks - Nampa, Vallivue S.D.
- Rocky Mountain Grizzlies - Meridian
- Timberline Wolves - Boise

District IV/V/VI, (6A) - (South Central - Southeast - East)

- Canyon Ridge Riverhawks - Twin Falls
- Highland Rams - Pocatello
- Madison Bobcats - Rexburg
- Rigby Trojans
- Thunder Ridge Titans - Idaho Falls

== 5A Conferences ==
District I/II, Inland Empire League (5A) - (North)

- Lakeland Hawks - Rathdrum
- Lewiston Bengals
- Moscow Bears
- Sandpoint Bulldogs

District III, Southern Idaho Conference (5A) - (Southwest)

- Bishop Kelly Knights - Boise
- Caldwell Cougars
- Columbia Wildcats - Nampa
- Middleton Vikings
- Skyview Hawks - Nampa
- Vallivue Falcons - Caldwell in Vallivue S.D.

District IV, Great Basin Conference - (South Central)

- Burley Bobcats
- Jerome Tigers
- Minico Spartans - Rupert
- Mountain Home Tigers
- Twin Falls Bruins
- Wood River Wolverines - Hailey

District V, South East Idaho Conference - (Southeast)

- Century Diamondbacks - Inkom
- Pocatello Thunder

District VI, High Country Conference (5A) - (East)

- Blackfoot Broncos
- Bonneville Bees - Idaho Falls
- Hillcrest Knights - Ammon
- Idaho Falls Tigers
- Shelley Russets
- Skyline Grizzlies - Idaho Falls

== 4A Conferences ==
District I, Intermountain League - (North)

- Bonners Ferry Badgers
- Coeur d' Alene Charter Panthers
- Timberlake Tigers - Spirit Lake

District III, Snake River Valley Conference - (Southwest)

- Cole Valley Christian Chargers - Meridian
- Emmett Huskies
- Fruitland Grizzlies
- Homedale Trojans
- McCall-Donnelly Vandals
- Renaissance Cardinals - Meridian
- Weiser Wolverines

District IV, Sawtooth Central Idaho Conference - (South central)

- Filer Wildcats
- Gooding Senators
- Kimberly Bulldogs

District V, South East Idaho Conference - (Southeast)

- American Falls Beavers
- Bear Lake Bears - Montpelier
- Preston Indians
- Snake River Panthers - Blackfoot

District VI, Mountain Rivers Conference - (East)

- South Fremont Cougars - St. Anthony
- Sugar-Salem Diggers
- Teton Timberwolves - Driggs

== 3A Conferences ==
District I/II, Central Idaho League - (North Central)

- Grangeville Bulldogs
- Kellogg Wildcats
- Orofino Maniacs
- Priest River Spartans
- St. Maries Lumberjacks

District III, Western Idaho Conference - (Southwest)

- Ambrose Archers - Meridian
- Compass Aviators - Meridian
- Idaho Arts Phoenix - Nampa
- Marsing Huskies
- Melba Mustangs
- Nampa Christian Trojans
- New Plymouth Pilgrims
- North Star Huskies - Eagle
- Parma Panthers
- Payette Pirates
- Sage Yeti - Boise
- Vision Charter Golden Eagles - Caldwell

District IV/V, South East Idaho Conference - (South Central - Southeast)

- Aberdeen Tigers
- Buhl Indians
- Declo Hornets
- Malad Dragons
- Marsh Valley Eagles - Arimo
- Soda Springs Cardinals
- Sun Valley Community Cutthroats
- Wendell Trojans
- West Side Pirates - Dayton

District VI, Nuclear Conference - (East)

- Alturas Prep Pumas - Idaho Falls
- Firth Cougars
- North Fremont Huskies - Ashton
- Ririe Bulldogs
- Salmon Savages
- West Jefferson Panthers - Terreton

== 2A Conferences ==
District I, Scenic Idaho Conference - (North)

- Genesis Jaguars - Post Falls
- Lakeside Knights - Plummer
- North Idaho STEM Pirates - Rathdrum
- Wallace Miners

District II, White Pine League - (North Central)

- Clearwater Valley Rams - Kooskia
- Kamiah Kubs
- Lapwai Wildcats
- Logos Knights - Moscow
- Potlatch Loggers
- Prairie Pirates - Cottonwood
- Troy Trojans

District III, Western Idaho Conference - (Southwest)

- Centennial Mustangs - Caldwell
- Garden Valley Wolverines
- Gem State Jaguars - Caldwell
- Idaho City Wildcats
- Liberty Charter Patriots - Nampa
- Notus Pirates
- Rimrock Raiders - Grand View
- Riverstone International Otters - Boise
- TV Classical Timberwolf - Fruitland
- Tri-Valley Titans - Cambridge/Midvale
- Victory Vipers - Nampa
- Wilder Wildcats - (Wilder)

District IV, Snake River Conference - (South Central)

- Castleford Wolves
- Glenns Ferry Pilots
- Hagerman Pirates
- Magic Valley Ocelots - Twin Falls
- Murtaugh Red Devils
- Oakley Hornets
- Raft River Trojans - (Malta)
- Shoshone Indians
- Valley Vikings - (Hazelton)
- Xavier Charter Phoenix - (Twin Falls)

District V/VI, High Desert Conference - (Southeast - East)

- Butte County Pirates - Arco
- Challis Vikings
- Grace Grizzlies
- Taylor's Crossing Eagles - Idaho Falls

== 1A Conferences ==
District I, North Star League - (North)

- Clark Fork Wampus Cats
- Coeur de Christ Saints - Coeur d'Alene
- Kootenai Warriors - Harrison
- Mullan Tigers

District II, Whitepine League - (North Central)

- Culdesac Wolves
- Deary Mustangs
- Genesee Bulldogs
- Highland Huskies - Craigmont
- Kendrick Tigers
- Nezperce Nighthawks
- St. John Bosco Patriots - Cottonwood
- Timberline Spartans - Weippe

District III, Long Pin Conference - (Southwest)

- Cascade Ramblers
- Council Lumberjacks
- Greenleaf Grizzlies
- Horseshoe Bend Mustangs
- Meadows Valley Mountaineers - New Meadows
- Salmon River Savages - Riggins

District IV, Sawtooth Conference - (South Central)

- Bliss Bears
- Camas County Mushers - Fairfield
- Carey Panthers
- Dietrich Blue Devils
- Hansen Huskies
- ISDB Raptors
- Lighthouse Christian Lions - Twin Falls
- Richfield Tigers

District V/VI, Rocky Mountain Conference - (Southeast - East)

- American Heritage Patriots - Idaho Falls
- Clark County Bobcats - Dubois
- Grace Lutheran Royals - Pocatello
- Leadore Mustangs
- Mackay Miners
- North Gem Cowboys - Bancroft
- Rockland Bulldogs
- Sho-Ban Chiefs - Fort Hall
- Watersprings Warriors - Idaho Falls

== Neighboring states ==
- Washington Interscholastic Activities Association
- Oregon School Activities Association
- Nevada Interscholastic Activities Association
- Montana High School Association
- Wyoming High School Activities Association
- Utah High School Activities Association

== See also ==
- National Federation of State High School Associations (NFHS)
