= Mullan Junior/Senior High School =

Location
- 345 Park Street; Mullan, Idaho; United States; 47.469143°N 115.798186°W

Information
- Type: Public
- Established: 1888; 138 years ago
- School district: Mullan School District #392
- Principal: Jacki Almquist
- Staff: 13.10 (FTE)
- Grades: 7–12
- Enrollment: 95 (2024–2025, K-12)
- Student to teacher ratio: 7.25
- Colors: Purple; White
- Athletics conference: 1A North Star League
- Mascot: Tigers
- Accreditation: Northwest Accreditation Commission (Cognia)
- Newspaper: Tiger Times; Telescope (Historical)
- Website: www.mullanschools.com

Mullan Junior/Senior High School, along with John Mullan Elementary school make up the grade K-12 Public School located in Mullan, Idaho.

== History ==
The first Mullan school opened in the late 1880s as a one-room schoolhouse. Community growth increased the school-age population and by 1892, a new larger school was required. The school was sold to the St. Andrew Episcopal Church and a new multi-roomed school was built to accommodate growing enrollment. The Mullan School District was established in 1895. A new, larger, multi-story brick high school building was constructed in 1927. The building cost $56,000 (equivalent to $811,418 in 2024) and included a combination 1,000 seat auditorium and gym, along with physics and chemistry laboratories. This is the school building currently housing the Mullan schools.

== Athletics ==
Mullan Tigers compete in the 1A division, the smallest division in the Idaho High School Activities Association (IHSAA). They participate in the District I North Star League. Current rivalries include Kootenai Warriors and Clark Fork Wampus Cats.

=== State championships ===
- Boys Basketball: 1965
- Football: 1983, 1984
