= GFHS =

GFHS may refer to:

- Glenns Ferry High School, Glenns Ferry, Idaho, United States
- Glens Falls High School, Glens Falls, New York, United States
- Godinez Fundamental High School, Santa Ana, California, United States
- Great Falls High School, Great Falls, Montana, United States
