= Garden Valley =

Garden Valley may refer to the following places:

- Garden Valley, California, U.S.
- Garden Valley, Idaho, U.S.
  - Garden Valley High School
- Garden Valley, Texas, U.S.
- Garden Valley, Wisconsin, U.S.

== See also ==
- Garden Valley School Division, Winkler, Manitoba, Canada
- Garden Valley Road, Alberta Highway 627, Canada
