= Fruitland High School =

Location
- 501 Iowa Avenue, P.O. Box A Fruitland, Idaho 83619; United States; 44°00′22″N 116°55′05″W

Information
- Type: Public
- School district: Fruitland S.D. (#373)
- Superintendent: Lyle Bailey
- Principal: Wade Carter
- Teaching staff: 28.56 (FTE)
- Grades: 9–12
- Enrollment: 525 (2023-2024)
- Student to teacher ratio: 18.38
- Colors: Orange & Black
- Athletics: IHSAA Class 4A
- Athletics conference: Snake River Valley
- Mascot: Grizzly
- Yearbook: Poma Terra
- Feeder schools: Fruitland Middle School
- Information: (208) 452-4411
- Elevation: 2,220 ft (680 m) AMSL
- Website: www.fruitlandschools.org/o/fhs

Fruitland High School is a four-year public secondary school in Fruitland, Idaho, the only traditional high school in Fruitland School District #373. One of three high schools in Payette County in southwestern Idaho, FHS had an enrollment of 494 in the 2011–2012 school year.

== Athletics ==
Fruitland competes in athletics in IHSAA Class 3A in the Snake River Valley Conference with Homedale, Parma, Payette, and Weiser.

=== State titles ===
Boys

- Football (5): fall (A-3, now 2A) 1993; (3A) 2006, 2010 2016, 2017
- Basketball (5): (A-3, now 2A) 1980; (3A) 2008, 2011, 2012, 2018
- Wrestling (1): (3A) 2014
- Baseball (8): (3A) 2002, 2008, 2009, 2011, 2012, 2014, 2015 2016 (records not kept by IHSAA)
- Track (1): (A-3, now 2A) 1977

Girls

- Soccer (1): fall (3A) 2008
- Volleyball (2): fall (3A) 2012, 2014
- Tennis (2): (3A) 2011, 2012
- Softball (2): (3A) 2011, 2012

== Alumni ==
- Jordan Gross – NFL offensive tackle, Carolina Panthers, class of 1998
- Timothy J. Edens; U.S. Army Brigadier General, class of 1977
- Tom Edens – former MLB Pitcher, class of 1979
