= Timberline High School =

Timberline is a name for several high schools in North America, including:

- Timberline High School (Boise, Idaho)
- Timberline High School (Weippe, Idaho)
- Timberline High School (Lacey, Washington)

== See also ==
- Timberline Secondary School in Campbell River, British Columbia
