= Canyon Springs High School =

Canyon Springs High School can refer to:

- Canyon Springs High School (Caldwell, Idaho)
- Canyon Springs High School (Moreno Valley, California)
- Canyon Springs High School (North Las Vegas, Nevada)
