= Cole Valley Christian High School =

Private Christian school in Meridian, Idaho, US

Cole Valley Christian School
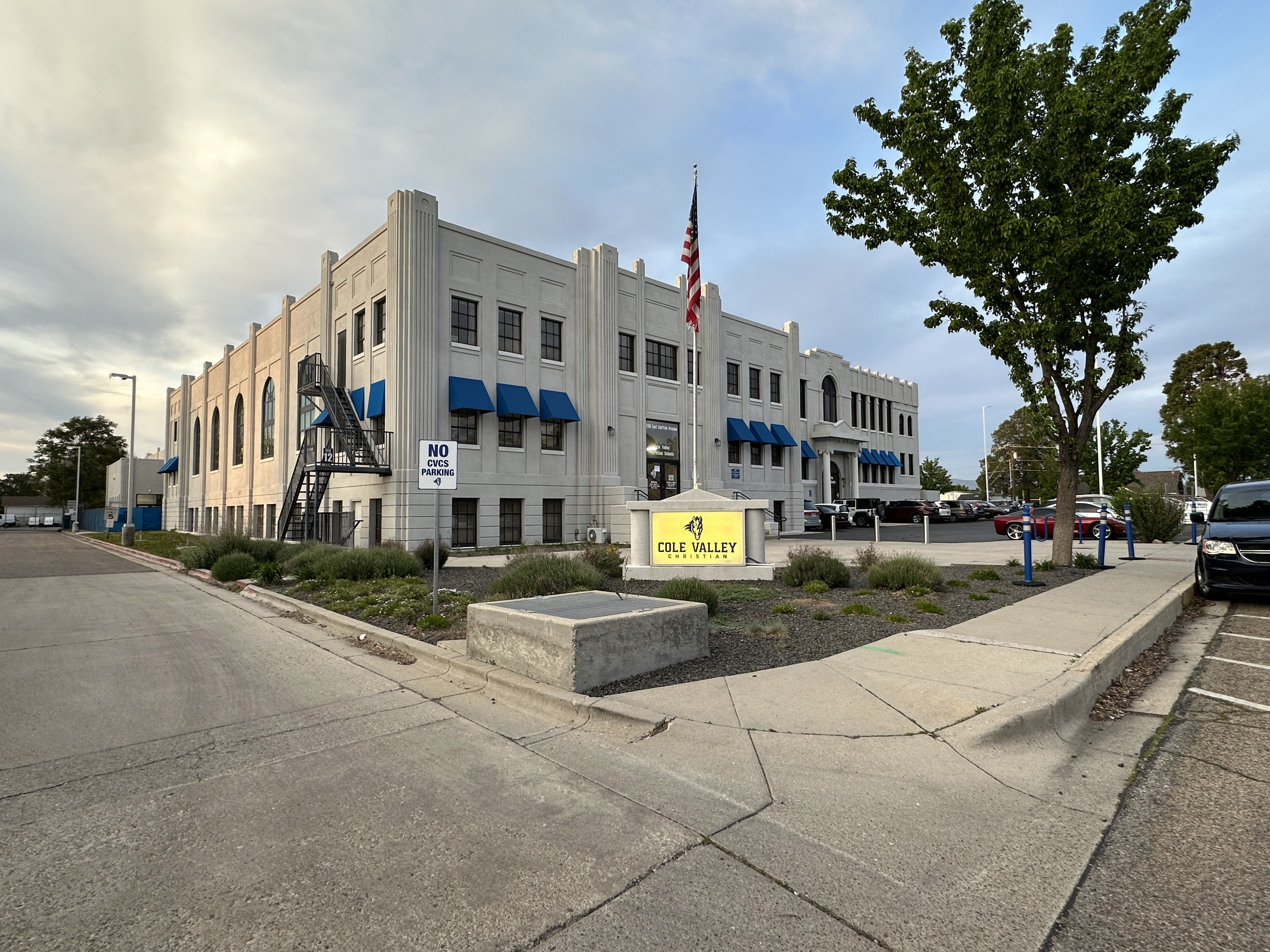
- Entrance to Cole Valley Christian High School

Location
- 200 East Carlton Avenue; Meridian, Idaho 83642; United States; 43°36′51″N 116°23′25″W

Information
- Type: Private Christian
- Established: 1972
- Principal: Kim DeMain
- Grades: 6-12
- Enrollment: Approx 800
- Colors: Royal blue, silver and white
- Nickname: Chargers
- IHSAA Division: 4A
- Website: www.colevalleychristian.org

Cole Valley Christian Schools is a private Christian school system in Meridian, Idaho.

It is divided into an elementary campus and a secondary campus.

== History ==
In 1972 the school began operations as Cole Christian School. Its initial enrollment was 13. In an August 1999 article, the Idaho Statesman reported a 3.6% increase in private school enrollment over the previous year. Valley Christian High School was founded in 1990, and merged with Cole Christian School in 1999 to become Cole Valley Christian School.

About 2012 the school opened The Idaho Learning Center & Academy for students who had difficulty studying. The initial enrollment of that program was below 20.

According to Anna Webb of the Idaho Statesman, circa 2007-2017 the number of students at Cole Valley "has risen steadily", with the elementary division having the highest growth. As of the start of the 2017-2018 school year, enrollment in the school system was 950 and enrollment in the learning academy was 95. At that time the learning academy had a waiting list.

By 2020 the school system combined had 900 students. In 2021 this figure had increased to 1,160, and there were more than 250 children requesting classes in all grade levels, on the school's waiting list. The elementary division already used many portable buildings, and the school administration added four portable buildings for the high school division.

To accommodate the rising demand, in June 2021, the school purchased 72 acres north of McMillan Road and west of McDermott Road. Plans are underway for a new campus to accommodate as many as 1,800 students, including "a playground, four gymnasiums, a football and soccer stadium and a 700-person auditorium".

== Athletics ==
In 1996, the school became eligible for state competitions. In 2002, the boys basketball team won the State Championship over Castleford High School. In 2004 the team won the State Championship once again, this time defeating Council High School (Idaho). In 2012, Cole Valley won State Championship again, defeating Kamiah High School. They have also had recent success in golf, with both the boys and girls teams winning state championships the past few years.
