= St. Maries High School =

Location
- 424 Hells Gulch Road; St. Maries, Idaho; United States; 47.329°N 116.574°W

Information
- Type: Public
- School district: St. Maries J.S.D. (#41)
- Principal: John Cordell
- Teaching staff: 18.23 (FTE)
- Grades: 9–12
- Enrollment: 281 (2023-2024)
- Student to teacher ratio: 15.41
- Colors: Forest Green & Gold
- Athletics: IHSAA Class 2A
- Athletics conference: Central Idaho League
- Mascot: Lumberjack
- Rival: Kellogg
- Yearbook: Lumberjack
- Feeder schools: St. Maries Middle School
- Elevation: 2,180 ft (660 m) AMSL
- Website: St. Maries High School

Location in Idaho

St. Maries High School is a four-year public secondary school in St. Maries, Idaho, the only high school in the St. Maries Joint School District #41. Located in north central Idaho in Benewah County, the high school is just north of the city and its airport, across the St. Joe River. Adjacent to a national forest in an area historically dominated by logging, the school colors are forest green and gold and the mascot is a lumberjack.

The middle school and only elementary school (Heyburn) in St. Maries have the same mascot and school colors as the high school. The lumberjack statue at the elementary school on Main Street was originally a Texaco "Big Friend," a Muffler Man from the mid-1960s.

== Athletics ==
St. Maries competes in athletics in IHSAA Class 2A, in the Central Idaho League (CIL) with Grangeville and Orofino. Until 2012, SMHS was a member of the Intermountain League (IML) in Class 3A. The girls volleyball team won ten consecutive state titles in Class A-2 (now 3A) from 1984 to 1993. The tenth title was their 142nd consecutive victory.

=== Rivalry ===
The main rival is Kellogg, about forty miles (65 km) to the northeast in the Silver Valley. The major school spirit competition between the two is called the "Brawl For The Ball." Begun in 2007, every level of basketball competes, and the schools also square off in a food drive, a dance-off, a cheerleading competition, and school spirit challenges.

The winner receives a ball painted in both schools' colors and retains it for that year. In 2012, the respective school district superintendents had a friendly wager on the outcome of the boys' varsity basketball game; the loser had to wear the winner's jersey at the next superintendents' meeting.

=== State titles ===
Boys

- Basketball (2): (AA, now 3A) 1960 (2A)2021
- Golf (1): (B, now 3A) 1980 (introduced in 1956)

Girls

- Volleyball (12): fall (A-2, now 3A) 1982, 1984, 1985, 1986, 1987, 1988, 1989, 1990, 1991, 1992, 1993; (3A) 2009 (introduced in 1976)
- Basketball (2): (A-2, now 3A) 1987, 1988 (introduced in 1976)
- Golf (1): (B, now 3A) 1994 (introduced in 1987)

== See also ==
- List of high schools in Idaho
