= Horseshoe Bend Middle/High School =

Location
- 398 School Drive; Horseshoe Bend, Idaho; United States; 43.9087306°N 116.2017952°W

Information
- Type: Public
- Motto: An Attitude of Excellence
- Established: 1990; 36 years ago
- School district: Horseshoe Bend School District #73
- Principal: Dennis Chestnut
- Staff: 10.99 (FTE)
- Grades: 6–12
- Enrollment: 86 (2024–2025, K-12)
- Student to teacher ratio: 7.83
- Colors: Silver; Black
- Athletics conference: 1A Long Pin Conference
- Mascot: Mustangs
- Rivals: Salmon River High School
- Accreditation: Northwest Accreditation Commission (Cognia)
- Website: www.hsbschools.org/schools/

Horseshoe Bench Middle/High School is a grade 6-12 Public School located in Horseshoe Bend, Idaho.

== History ==
As early as 1872, multiple schoolhouses served the area mining communities. Horseshoe Bend opened its own high school in 1990 and students from neighboring Banks and Gardena communities also attend the school. The campus includes a gymnasium, football field, baseball and softball fields and a track.

== Athletics ==
Horseshoe Bend Mustangs compete in the 1A division, the smallest division in the Idaho High School Activities Association (IHSAA). They participate in the District III Long Pin Conference.

=== State championships ===
- Football: 2004
- Softball: 2014, 2017
- Volleyball: 2008, 2017, 2018, 2021, 2022, 2026
