= Timothy J. Edens =

American army officer (born 1958)

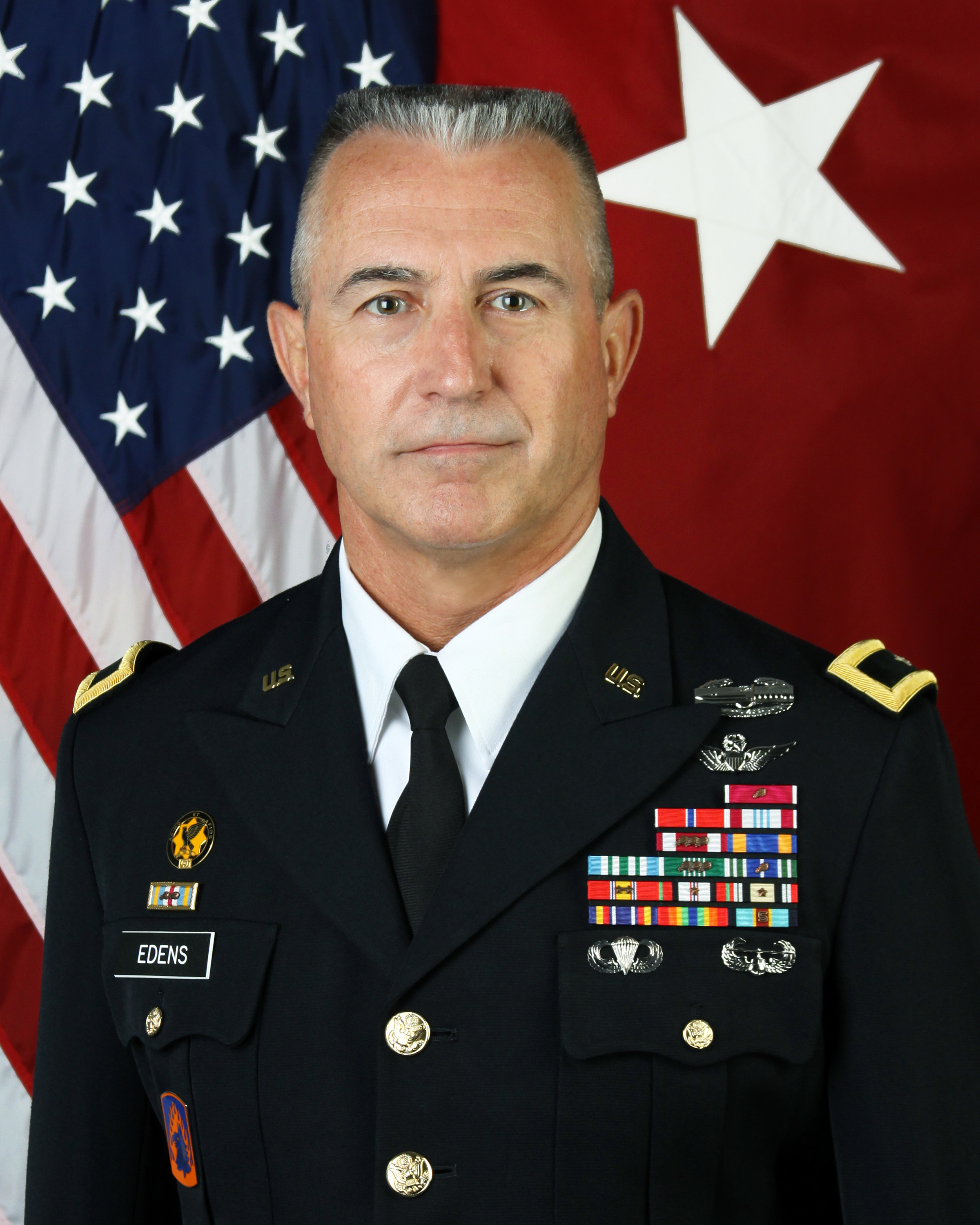
- Born: December 23, 1958 (age 67); Oregon, U.S.
- Alma mater: United States Military Academy; United States Army War College
- Spouse: Leslie J. Brassard
- Military career
- Allegiance: United States of America
- Branch: United States Army
- Service years: 1981–2014
- Rank: Brigadier General
- Commands: 4th BDE 1st Infantry Division; 12th Combat Aviation Brigade; United States Army Combat Readiness/Safety Center
- Conflicts: Operation Enduring Freedom; Iraq War
- Awards: Legion of Merit (2); Bronze Star; DMSM; MSM (4); Air Medal; Order of St. Michael (Gold)

Timothy James Edens (born December 23, 1958) is a retired United States Army Brigadier General and US Army combat Master Aviator, who commanded the 4th Brigade Avn, 1st Infantry Division and 12th Combat Aviation Brigade, both while deployed to Iraq. He later served as director of Army Safety and commanding general, USACR/Safety Center.

== Early life and education ==
Born in Oregon and raised in Idaho, Edens graduated from Fruitland High School in 1977 and was accepted to the United States Military Academy's class of 1981. While attending West Point, Edens participated in Glee Club, Rugby, and Sprint football. He graduated from West Point in 1981 with a bachelor's degree in engineering with a concentration in political science and national security. Edens graduated from the Army Command and General Staff College in 1995. He later earned a master's degree from the Army War College in 2003.

== Military career ==
Upon graduation from West Point, Edens was commissioned as a lieutenant in the United States Army. He became an Army helicopter pilot, and later was an instructor pilot at the Fort Rucker Apache Course. As a major, Edens served as the Regimental Operations and Training Officer for the 4th squadron 9th Cavalry Regiment in Fort Wainwright, Alaska. In August 2006, Colonel Edens took command of the newly restructured 12th Combat Aviation Brigade. He commanded the 12th CAB as Task Force XII while the brigade was deployed to Balad Air Base and Camp Taji, Iraq. Upon his return, Colonel Edens was award the Legion of Merit by Army General Carter Ham for his successful leadership of Task Force XII in OIF 07–09. Following his assignment commanding 12th CAB, Edens became the Deputy Commanding General for Support, 2nd Infantry Division in Korea. Edens was promoted to brigadier general by Maj. Gen. Anthony G. Crutchfield in March 2011, and thereafter served as assistant division commander for support and the senior ranking aviator of the division. General Edens subsequently was assigned as Deputy Commander of the United States Army Aviation Center of Excellence at Fort Rucker. His final assignment with the US Army was as commander of the United States Army Combat Readiness Center.

While in command of the USACRC, he started several safety initiatives seemingly resulting in a downward trend in reported accidents Army-wide. Edens was also openly critical of military budget cuts in and how it could potentially effect the safety of soldiers.

At his retirement ceremony, he was awarded the Order of St. Michael Gold Award for serving the Army Aviation community with distinction.

== Post-retirement ==
After retiring from the military, Edens worked for AECOM and subsequently Amentum in Daleville, Alabama as Director of Aviation Operations and Readiness. He is also secretary of the Army Aviation Association of America.

== Decorations and badges ==
From

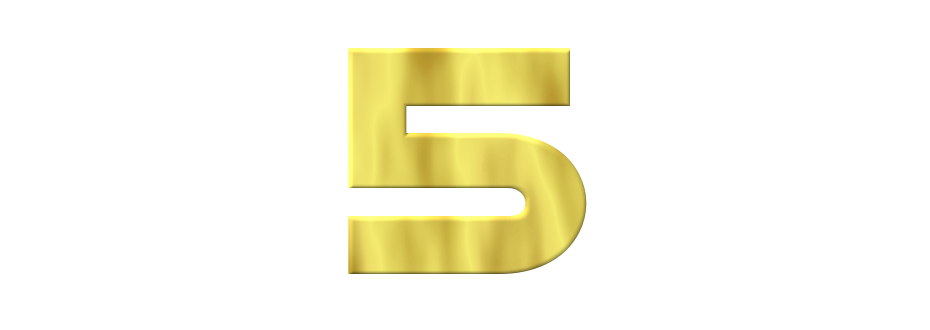
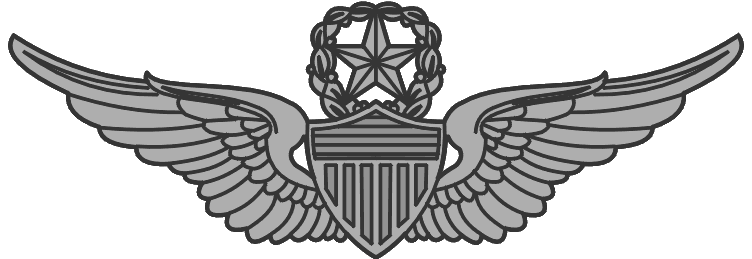
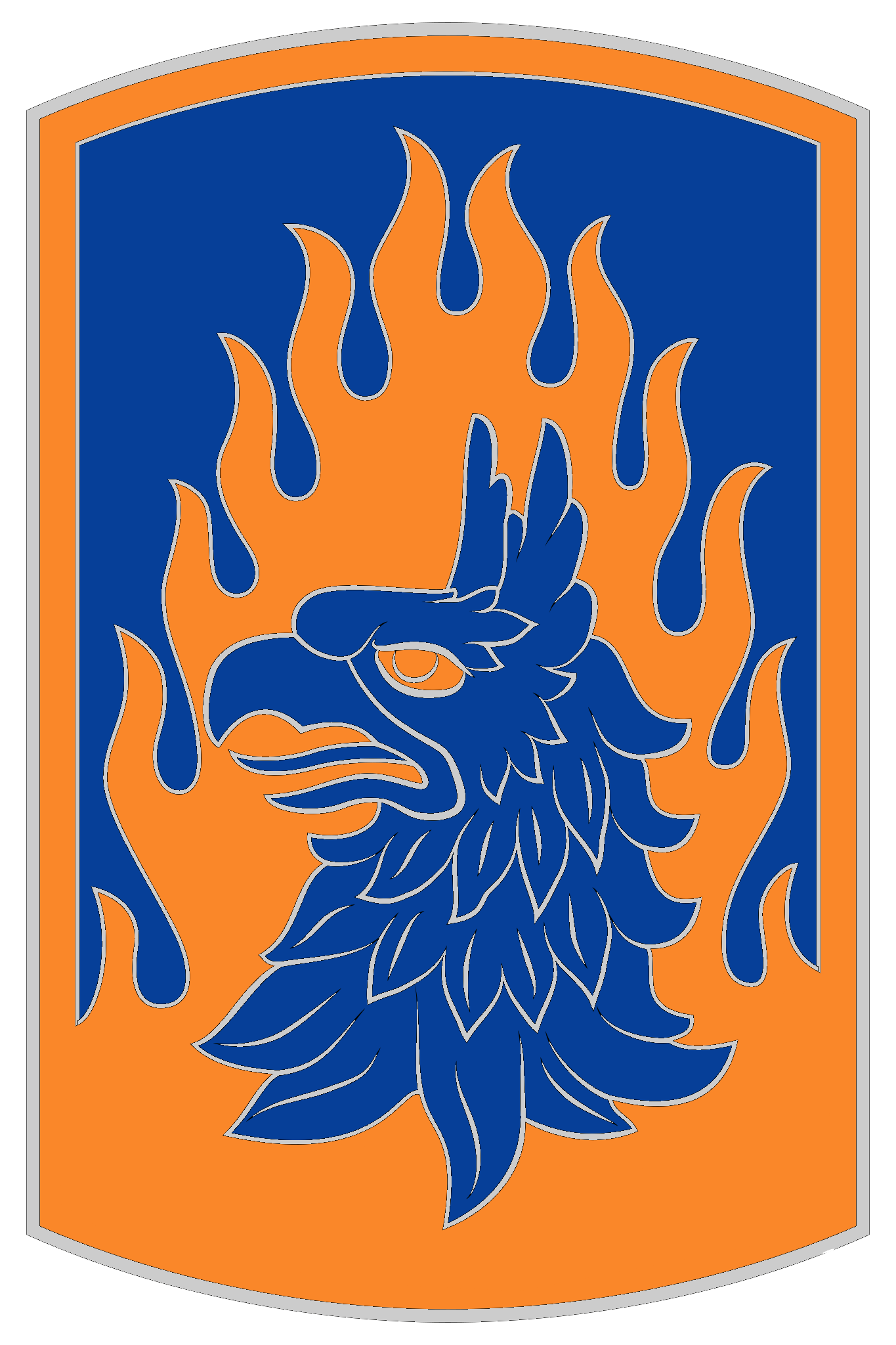
Legion of Merit (with oak leaf cluster)
Bronze Star Medal
Defense Meritorious Service Medal
Meritorious Service Medal (with three oak leaf clusters)
Air Medal
Joint Service Commendation Medal
Army Commendation Medal (with three oak leaf clusters)
Army Achievement Medal (with oak leaf clusters)
Joint Meritorious Unit Award (with two oak leaf clusters)
National Defense Service Medal (with two bronze service stars)
Afghanistan Campaign Medal (with service star)
Iraq Campaign Medal (with service star)
Global War on Terrorism Service Medal
Army Service Ribbon
Overseas Service Ribbon (with bronze award numeral 5)
Combat Action Badge
Army Master Aviator Badge
Air Assault Badge
Basic Parachutist Badge
12th Combat Aviation Brigade Combat Service Identification Badge
