= Kimberly High School (Kimberly, Idaho) =

- 141 Center Street West; Kimberly, Idaho

Information
- Type: Public
- Principal: Darin Gonzalez
- Teaching staff: 32.95 (FTE)
- Grades: 9-12
- Enrollment: 617 (2023-2024)
- Student to teacher ratio: 18.73
- Colors: Red, Black & White
- Mascot: Bulldog
- Rivals: Filer High School
- IHSAA Division: 3A
- NRHP Reference#: 90001229
- Website: www.kimberly.edu/khs

Kimberly High School is a high school located at 885 Center Street West in Kimberly, Idaho. The school serves grades nine through twelve. Its historic building, at 141 Center Street West, is currently used by the school district as a general sports center, and the building is listed on the National Register of Historic Places.

== Student attendance ==
As of the 2021-2022 school year, the high school has a student attendance of 560 students, the highest record for the school. Data of student attendance for the 06-07, 07-08, 09-10, 11-12, 13-14, 14-15, 16-17, 17-18, and 19-20 classes are not currently known to exist. The lowest known student attendance belongs to the class of 2005, with 406 students.

== Sports ==
Kimberly High School competes in IHSAA Class 4A athletics, in the Sawtooth Central Idaho Conference.

In 2010, the Kimberly Bulldogs lost a close football game to American Falls 46–41, and lost their homecoming game to Sugar-Salem 30–8. However, they were the conference champions and won third place at state.

In 2017, the volleyball team placed third at the state championship. Football continues to be strong, cross country girls placed second at state, and swim placed first at districts up against 4A schools, despite Kimberly being a 3A school.

In 2022, the boys basketball team won the state championship for the first time in 70 years against McCall-Donnelly with a score of 40-22. The Bulldogs set the 3A state record for the fewest points allowed in a single tournament, only allowing 98 points through 3 games. That same year, Kimberly High School's boys cross country team made history by winning their first-ever state championship title, led by top-5 finishers Ben Browning and Grayden Devries.

Kimberly has enjoyed continued success in their athletic programs. They won the IHSAA 3A School of Excellence Award in back-to-back years in 2023 and 2024. The award recognizes the best overall school in the state with regard to performance in athletics, academics, and sportsmanship for all sports teams. During Kirby Bright’s tenure as Kimberly High School’s Athletic Director, the Bulldogs took home 55 state trophies, 8 Academic State Champions titles and 8 Sportsmanship awards.

State Titles (26)

Boys

- Basketball (2): 1952, 3A 2022
- Cross Country (1): 3A 2022
- Track and Field (3): 3A 2009, 2021, 2026
- Golf (6): 2A 1998, 3A 2022, 2023, 2024, 2025, 2026

Girls

- Basketball (1): 1984
- Softball (5): 3A 2007, 2009, 2010, 2023, 2024
- Track and Field (3): 3A 2019, 2025, 2026
- Volleyball (1): 3A 2022
- Golf (4): 3A 2022, 2024, 2025, 2026

== History ==
- Kimberly High School
- U.S. National Register of Historic Places
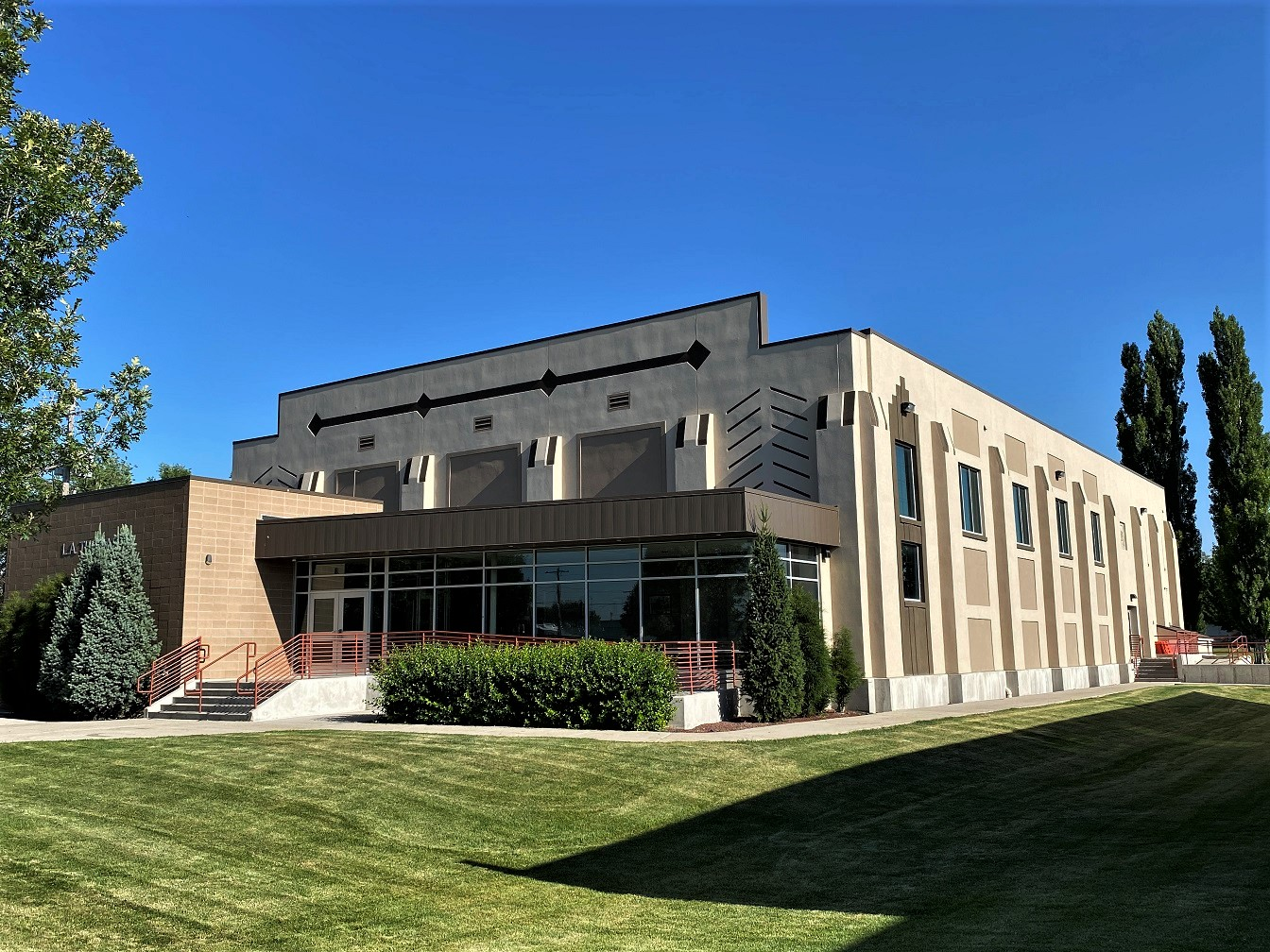

- Location within Idaho Location within the United States
- Location: 141 Center St. W. Kimberly, Idaho
- Coordinates: 42°32′00″N 114°21′55″W
- Area: 1 acre (0.40 ha)
- Built: 1916
- Architect: Nisbet, B. Morgan
- NRHP reference No.: 90001229
- Added to NRHP: 17 August 1990

The Kimberly High School at 141 Center St. W. in Kimberly, Idaho was built in 1916, and was officially listed on the National Register of Historic Places in 1990. The building was designed and built by Boise architect B. Morgan Nisbet. The structure was once used as the Kimberly Junior High and District Office.
