= Darwin Young =

American politician (1924–2020)

Member of the Idaho House of Representatives
- In office 1977–1981

Personal details
- Born: Darwin LaMar Young; October 20, 1924 Shelley, Idaho, U.S.
- Died: May 29, 2020 (aged 95) Blackfoot, Idaho, U.S.
- Party: Republican

Military service
- Branch/service: United States Army
- Battles/wars: World War II

Darwin LaMar Young (October 20, 1924 – May 29, 2020) was an American politician who served as a member of the Idaho House of Representatives from 1977 to 1981.

== Early life ==
Young was born in Shelley, Idaho and graduated from Shelley High School.

== Career ==
He served in the United States Army Air Corps during World War II. Young owned and operated a farm near Blackfoot, Idaho. He served as a member of the Idaho House of Representatives from 1977 to 1981

== Death ==
Young died in 2020 in Blackfoot, Idaho.
