= Lapwai High School =

Coordinates: 46°24′06″N 116°48′20″W

- 404 S. Main St. Lapwai, Idaho; U.S.

Information
- Type: Public
- School district: Lapwai S.D. #341
- Principal: D'Lisa Penney
- Teaching staff: 18.83 (FTE)
- Grades: 6–12
- Enrollment: 267 (2023-2024)
- Student to teacher ratio: 14.18
- Colors: Columbia & White
- Athletics: IHSAA Class 1AD1
- Athletics conference: White Pine League
- Mascot: Wildcat
- Yearbook: Kee-Mah-Mar
- Feeder schools: Lapwai Middle School
- Elevation: 970 ft (296 m) AMSL
- Website: www.lapwai.org/secondary/secondary.php

Lapwai High School is a four-year public secondary school in Lapwai, Idaho, the only traditional high school in Lapwai School District #341. Located in Nez Perce County on the Nez Perce Indian Reservation in the north central part of the state, the school colors are Columbia and white and the mascot is a wildcat.

== Athletics ==
Lapwai competes in athletics in IHSAA Class 1AD1 in the White Pine League. It was formerly a member of the Central Idaho League

The school competes in football, basketball, and track and field, among others. Lapwai holds the state's longest basketball winning streak at 81 games. Lapwai won three consecutive A-3 (now 2A) state championships (1987–89) under head coach Bruce Crossfield.

The Lapwai Boys Basketball Program is second for most state championships with 12 and only behind Borah High School with 13 state championships. With the most recent addition to the trophy case, Lapwai now has had seven different coaches lead them to the top, Harley Williams (1956), Darryl Moulton (1984), Bruce Crossfield (1987–89), Josh Leighton Jr. (2000, 2002), Eric Spencer (2006), Bob Sobotta Jr. (2017, 2018), Zachary Eastman (2021,2022).

The Lapwai Girls Basketball Program leads the state for most state championships with 11, many schools trail behind by one-three championships. The Lapwai girls program has been led to the state title by five different coaches, Ferris Paisano (1976), Dan Wilson (1989), Shawn Spencer (1998, 2002, 2009, 2011), Eric Spencer (2015–17), and Ada McCormack-Marks (2020,2022).

=== State titles ===
Boys

- Basketball (11): (B, now 2A) 1956; (A-3, now 2A) 1984, 1987, 1988, 1989, 2000; (2A) 2002; (1A) 2006; (1AD1) 2016, 2017, 2021
- Track (1): (B, now 2A) 1966
- Football (1): (2A) 1979

Girls

- Basketball (10): (B, now 2A) 1976; (A-3, now 2A) 1989, 1998; (2A) 2002;(1AD1) 2009, 2011, 2015, 2016, 2017, 2020 (introduced in 1976)

== Alumni ==
- Lillian (Bounds) Disney (1899–1997) – wife of Walt Disney

== See also ==
- List of high schools in Idaho
