= Twin Falls Christian Academy =

Coordinates: 42°34′31″N 114°26′23″W

- Twin Falls, Idaho; United States

Information
- Type: Christian (Baptist)
- Established: 1975
- Principal: Brent Walker
- Faculty: See
- Grades: K-12
- Enrollment: 123
- Colors: Gold, blue and white
- Athletics conference: IHSAA 1A
- Mascot: Warriors
- Website: Twin Falls Christian Academy

Twin Falls Christian Academy is a private Christian school in Twin Falls, Idaho. This school opened in 1975. It is a ministry of Grace Baptist Church.
