= Kamiah High School =

Coordinates: 46.2235°N 116.0307°W

- 711 Ninth St. Kamiah, Idaho; U.S.

Information
- Type: Public
- Established: c. 1914; 1959 (current)
- School district: Kamiah S.D. #304
- Principal: Peggy Flerchinger
- Teaching staff: 9.60 (FTE)
- Grades: 9–12
- Enrollment: 120 (2023–2024)
- Student to teacher ratio: 12.50
- Colors: Maroon & White
- Athletics: IHSAA Class 1A
- Athletics conference: White Pine League
- Mascot: Kub
- Newspaper: Kubville Chatter
- Yearbook: Kub
- Feeder schools: Kamiah Middle School
- Elevation: 1,260 ft (385 m) AMSL
- Website: Kamiah High School

Location in Idaho

Kamiah High School (KAM-ee-eye) is a four-year public secondary school in Kamiah, Idaho, the only high school in Kamiah School District #304. Located in the Clearwater Valley of rural Lewis County in the north central part of the state, the school colors are maroon and white and the mascot is a Kub.

At the south end of the city, the high school was built in 1914, and the current building on 9th Street opened 67 years ago in November 1959.

== Athletics ==
Kamiah competes in athletics in IHSAA Class 1A in the White Pine League. It was formerly a member of the Central Idaho League with Grangeville and Orofino in Class 2A. KHS moved down to 1A in the summer of 2012 and won the 1A (Division I) state title in football that fall.

=== State titles ===
Boys

- Football (4): fall (A-3, now 2A) 1978, 2000; (2A) 2001; (1A, Div I) 2012 (official with introduction of A-3 playoffs, fall 1977)
- Track (6): (A-3, now 2A) 1979, 1980, 1981, 2001; (2A) 2002, 2012

Girls

- Track (4): (A-3, now 2A) 1982, 1987, 1988, 1989 (introduced in 1971)

== Notable graduates ==
- Ken Hobart, former CFL quarterback, Class of 1979
- Karleen Pardue-Williams/Karly Rose, National Beauty Queen, speaker, Class of 1984
- Geoff Schroeder, state senator in the U.S. state of Idaho, Class of 1984
- C.J. Aragon 2010 National Intercollegiate Rodeo Association National Coach-of-the-Year, Class of 1993
