= Rockland School =

Location
- 321 E Center St; Rockland, Idaho; United States; 42.574693°N 112.873266°W

Information
- Type: Public
- Established: 1883; 143 years ago
- School district: Rockland School District #382
- Principal: Greg Larson
- Staff: 16.84 (FTE)
- Grades: K–12
- Enrollment: 167 (2024–2025, K-12); 63 (2025, 9-12)
- Student to teacher ratio: 9.92
- Colors: Royal Blue; Red; White
- Athletics conference: 1A Rocky Mountain Conference
- Mascot: Bulldogs
- Rivals: Watersprings High School
- Accreditation: Northwest Accreditation Commission (Cognia)
- Website: rbulldogs.org

Rockwell School is a grade K-12 Public High School located in Rockland, Idaho.

== History ==
As the Rockland area grew, a new log school was built in 1883 to provide enough room for the growing student population. In 1915, a new multi-story brick school building was built and housed the school until a storm and earthquake deemed it unusable in 1937. A new school was under construction but wasn't completed until the spring of 1938, so classes were held in two local churches and a community building. The current building was built in 1994 and is home to grades K - 12. According to the Idaho High School Activities Association (IHSAA), Rockland High School is one of the smallest schools in the state.

== Library ==
Since 1974, Rockland School has served as a School Community Library. It is just one of three such systems in the state with the other two being Sugar-Salem and Snake River School Community Libraries. These libraries are public libraries established by school district electors for the benefit of the school as well as the citizens of the community. They operate as both a public library and school library. After 1994, no new School Community libraries can be created following legislation enactments.

== Athletics ==
Rockland Bulldogs compete in the 1A division, the smallest division in the IHSAA. They participate in the District V Rocky Mountain Conference.

=== State championships ===
- Boys Basketball: 2022
- Boys Cross Country: 2023, 2024
- Girls Basketball: 2020, 2022, 2025
