= Valley High School (Idaho) =

Coordinates: 42°35′38″N 114°10′12″W

Location
- 882 Valley Road South; Hazelton, Idaho 83335; United States

Information
- Type: Public
- Principal: Risa Moffitt
- Teaching staff: 39.00 (FTE)
- Grades: K-12
- Enrollment: 488 (2023–2024)
- Student to teacher ratio: 12.51
- Colors: Royal blue and white
- Athletics conference: IHSAA 2A
- Mascot: Viking
- Website: www.valley262.org/valley-high-school

Valley High School is a four-year public secondary school located in Hazelton, Idaho, U.S.A. It is the main high school operated by the Valley School District, serving several rural communities in eastern Jerome County.

== Athletics ==
Valley High School is classified as a D1 school (enrollment between 160 and 319 in grades 9–12) by the IHSAA. It currently competes in the Canyon Conference against Declo and Wendell. !

The school colors are royal blue and white and Vikings is the mascot.

== See also ==
- List of high schools in Idaho
