= Melba High School =

Coordinates: 43°22′47″N 116°31′51″W

Melba Junior/Senior High School

Location
- 6870 Stokes Avenue; Melba, Idaho; United States

Information
- Type: Public
- Principal: Eric Forsgren
- Teaching staff: 24.50 (FTE)
- Grades: 7-12
- Enrollment: 395 (2023–2024)
- Student to teacher ratio: 16.12
- Colours: Red, white, and black
- Mascot: Mustang
- Newspaper: Kuna/Melba News, Melba Toast
- IHSAA Segmentation: 2A
- Website: Melba H.S

Melba High School is a public high school in Melba, Idaho.

== Sports ==
- Football
- Baseball
- Basketball
- Softball
- Volleyball
- Cross Country
- Track

In 2002, Melba beat Glenns Ferry High School in the 2A Football State Championship

== Clubs and student organizations ==
A tragedy struck Melba High School in 1987 for the FFA members. En route home from the FFA convention they laid over in Denver. On the way home from Denver the plane crashed taking off. The FFA advisor's wife and two students were killed in the crash.

- BPA
- FCCLA
- FFA
- FHLA
- Chess Club
- DotA Club
- Mustang Readers' Choice Award Committee
- Choir
- HOSA
- Pep band
- Marching Band
