= Challis High School =

- U.S. National Register of Historic Places
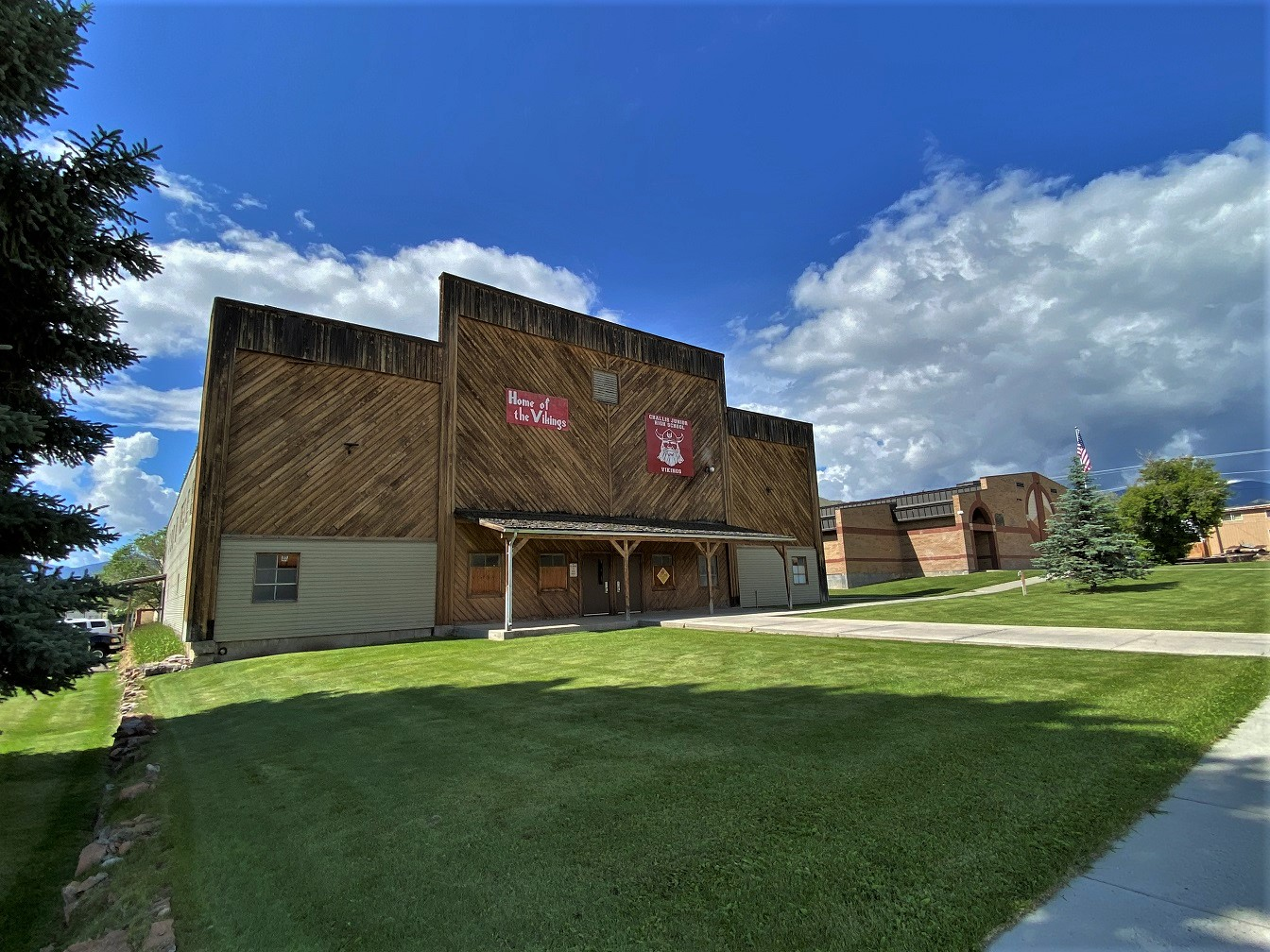
- The only section of the original building that remains.

- Location within Idaho
- Location: Main Ave. Challis, Idaho
- Coordinates: 44°30′17″N 114°13′52″W
- Area: less than one acre
- Built: 1922
- Architectural style: Art Deco
- MPS: Challis MRA
- NRHP reference No.: 80001305
- Added to NRHP: December 3, 1980

Challis Jr. Sr. High School is a school in Challis, Idaho. The former Challis High School, a building at 701 Main Ave. in Challis, Idaho, was listed on the National Register of Historic Places in 1980. It was destroyed by the 1983 Borah Peak earthquake.

It was a stone building, built of local tuff stone, which demonstrated "the persistence of the false-front idea in Challis architecture. Here, the false front masks a simpler gabled schoolhouse and projects an image more in keeping with urban schools of the period."
