= Lakeside High School (Plummer, Idaho) =

Coordinates: 47°20′00″N 116°53′28″W

Location
- 1150 E Street; Plummer, Idaho 83851; United States

Information
- Type: Public
- Principal: Jennifer Hall
- Teaching staff: 11.10 (FTE)
- Grades: 9-12
- Enrollment: 134 (2023-2024)
- Student to teacher ratio: 11.08
- Colors: Black, red, white
- Mascot: Knight
- IHSAA Division II: 1A
- Website: Lakeside H.S.

Lakeside High School is a public high school in Plummer, Idaho, United States. Home of the Knights, Lakeside High School sits on the Coeur d'Alene Indian Reservation. Attending students come from as far north as Fighting Creek and as far south as Sanders. Lakeside High School is in Plummer/Worley Joint School District #44, which manages three total schools, the other two being Lakeside Elementary School (Plummer, Idaho) and Lakeside Middle School (Plummer, Idaho). Lakeside High School is the result of the 1990 combination of the former Plummer and Worley High Schools.
