= Richfield School =

Location
- 555 North Tiger Drive; Richfield, Idaho; United States; 43.053284°N 114.157223°W

Information
- Type: Public
- Established: 1907; 119 years ago
- School district: Richfield School Districts #316
- Principal: Scott Guthrie
- Staff: 16.0
- Grades: K–12
- Enrollment: 208 (2025)
- Student to teacher ratio: 13.0
- Colors: Red; White; Black
- Athletics conference: 1A Sawtooth Conference
- Mascot: Tigers
- Accreditation: Cognia
- Website: www.richfieldsd.org

Richfield School is a grade K-12 Public located in Richfield, Idaho.

== History ==
The first school opened in 1907 and two years later in 1909, a new permanent lava rock structure was built. By 1912, the school served 85 students. A local hotel was used as part of the high school starting in the 1930s. In the late 1960s, a new building was constructed. Following a 2018 voter-approved bond a new gymnasium and agriculture education building were constructed.

== Athletics ==
Richfield Tigers compete in the 1A division, the smallest division in the Idaho High School Activities Association (IHSAA). They participate in the District IV Sawtooth Conference.

=== State championships ===
- Football: 1986
- Girls Basketball: 1979, 2007, 2009, 2010, 2015, 2016
- Girls Track: 1994
- Volleyball: 2015

== Notable people ==
- Donna Pence - Former Idaho Legislator
