= Orofino High School =

Orofino Junior-Senior High School

Location
- 300 Dunlap Rd. Orofino, Idaho; United States; 46.493°N 116.263°W

Information
- Type: Public
- School district: Orofino J.S.D. #171
- Principal: Brian Lee
- Teaching staff: 23.59 (FTE)
- Grades: 7–12
- Enrollment: 350 (2023–2024)
- Student to teacher ratio: 14.84
- Colors: Royal blue, black, and white
- Athletics: IHSAA Class 2A
- Athletics conference: Central Idaho League
- Mascot: Maniac
- Yearbook: Prospector
- Feeder schools: Orofino Junior High
- Elevation: 1,140 ft (350 m) AMSL
- Website: www.sd171.k12.id.us/ohs/

Location in the United States
Location in Idaho

Orofino Junior/Senior High School, is a six-year secondary school in the northwest United States, located in Orofino, Idaho, part of a combined high school and junior high school operated by the Orofino Joint School District #171. The school colors are royal blue, black, and white and the mascot is the maniac.

West of the city center, the present campus was built in the late 1960s, and the junior high was added recently, following the closure of the century-old junior high building in 2010. The 8th grade was added in 2010 and the 7th grade in 2012, after two years at the elementary school.

OHS overlooks the Clearwater River from above its north bank.

Orofino is the larger of the two high schools operated by the school district; the other is Timberline to the east, midway between Weippe and Pierce on Highway 11.

== Athletics ==
Orofino competes in athletics in IHSAA Class 2A in the Central Idaho League with Grangeville and St. Maries.

=== State titles ===
==== Boys ====
- Basketball (2): (B, now 2A) 1949, 1950
- Track (1): (A-2, now 3A) 1985

==== Girls ====
- Golf (1): (2A) 2008 (introduced in 1987)
