= Idaho Leadership Academy =

Coordinates: 43°06′57″N 112°35′45″W

- Pingree, Idaho; United States

Information
- Type: Charter
- Motto: Charity, Civility, Discipline, Excellence, Industry & Thrift, Integrity, Lifelong Love of Learning, Loyalty, Moral Virtue, Optimism, Originality & Creativity, and Patriotism
- Established: 2002
- Status: Closed
- Faculty: 7
- Grades: 9-12
- Enrollment: 75
- Colors: Maroon and Gold
- Website: Idaho Leadership Academy

Idaho Leadership Academy was a Liberal Arts Public Charter School in Pingree, Idaho. It closed in 2008, as the result of low enrollment and related funding shortfalls.
