= Bear Lake High School =

Coordinates: 42.329°N 111.296°W

- 330 Boise St. Montpelier, Idaho; U.S.

Information
- Type: Public
- School district: Bear Lake S.D (#33)
- Principal: Luke Kelsey
- Teaching staff: 22.20 (FTE)
- Grades: 9–12
- Enrollment: 361 (2024–2025)
- Student to teacher ratio: 16.26
- Colors: Royal Blue & White
- Athletics: IHSAA Class 2A
- Athletics conference: Southeastern Idaho
- Mascot: Bear
- Feeder schools: Bear Lake Middle School
- Elevation: 5,970 ft (1,820 m) AMSL
- Website: Bear Lake High School

Bear Lake High School is a public secondary school in Montpelier, Idaho, the only traditional high school of Bear Lake School District #33 and Bear Lake County.

== Athletics ==
Bear Lake currently (2016-2017) competes in athletics in IHSAA Class 2A and is a member of the Southeastern Idaho Conference.

=== State titles ===
Boys

- Football (2): fall 1999, 2022 (A-3, now 2A) (official with introduction of A-3 playoffs, fall 1977)
- Cross Country (4): fall (3A) 2004, 2005, 2006, 2007 (introduced in 1964)
- Basketball (2): (A-2, now 3A) 1996, (2A) 2017 2018 too man

Girls

- Cross Country (6): fall (3A) 2003, 2004, 2005, 2006, 2007, 2008 (introduced in 1974)
- Volleyball (5): fall (A-2, now 3A) 1997, 1998, 1999, 2000, 2001 (introduced in 1976)
- Basketball (1): (A-2, now 3A) 1998 (introduced in 1976)
