= Magic Valley Christian School =

Coordinates: 42°43′13″N 114°31′06″W

Magic Valley Christian School was a private, non-denominational Christian school in Jerome, Idaho serving the Magic Valley region including Jerome, Twin Falls, Idaho and surrounding areas of Southern Idaho. The school closed permanently in 2011.

This is a locator map showing Jerome County in Idaho.

== History ==
MVCS started in 1996 in the First Christian Church building in Twin Falls, moving to the Twin Falls Reformed Church building three years later. In 2007 it purchased the historic Washington School building in Jerome. Magic Valley Christian School renovated the school to accommodate its 51 students. After several years of declining enrollment and declining donations, Magic Valley Christian School closed permanently on January 3, 2011.

== Mission statement ==
The mission of Magic Valley Christian School, a non-denominational school, was to assist the Christian family and/or the Christian student by providing Bible-based Christ-centered education that inspired each student to pursue excellence in leadership, moral character, academics, and service to others.

== Accreditation ==
Magic Valley Christian School was a fully accredited institution under the following accrediting organizations:

- Association of Christian Schools International (ACSI)
- The Northwest Association of Accredited Schools
- The State of Idaho

== Sports ==
Magic Valley Christian School offered a variety of sports including football, basketball, volleyball, cheerleading, golf, and track. Magic Valley Christian School took 1st (04-05) and 4th (07-08) in boys golf at the Idaho 1A/2A State tournament and 1st (08-09) in girls golf at the Idaho 1A/2A State Tournament.
