= Lighthouse Christian School =

Location
- Twin Falls, Idaho; United States; 42°33′38″N 114°26′21″W

Information
- Type: Christian
- Established: 1995
- Principal: Thomas Luttrell
- Faculty: 60
- Grades: K3-12
- Enrollment: 415
- Colors: Navy blue, white, silver, and green
- Athletics conference: IHSAA 1A
- Mascot: Lions
- Website: www.lighthousecs.org

Lighthouse Christian School is a private Christian school located in Twin Falls, Idaho. Lighthouse Christian Middle/High School is fully accredited through the Association of Christian Schools International (ACSI), Northwest Association of Accredited Schools (NAAS), and the state of Idaho. Lighthouse Christian School describes itself as "a discipleship school" with a "Biblically-integrated instructional program".

== History ==
The school was founded in 1995. It does not receive state money, and is supported entirely by tuition. In 2006 the school became accredited by the Association of Christian Schools International and the Northwest Association of Accredited Schools. In 2018 the school underwent a major renovation project and in 2022 did a major improvement to the school's amenities.

== Athletics ==
Lighthouse Christian School has been recognized by the Idaho High School Activities Association as a "School of Excellence" for sportsmanship and academic achievement. In 2011 and 2014 Lighthouse won state in football for 1A DII. The Lions won state championships in volleyball in 2012, 2013, and 2014. The Lighthouse Boys Track won the 1A Championship in 2014. In 2015, they won the state championship in golf. In 2022 the school built a softball field and instituted a softball program.
