= Hansen High School =

Public school in Idaho, United States

Location
- 550 South Main Street; Hansen, Idaho 83334; United States
- Coordinates: 42°31′41″N 114°18′06″W

Information
- Type: Public
- Principal: Kayla Kelly
- Teaching staff: 10.53 (FTE)
- Grades: 7–12
- Enrollment: 133 (2023-2024)
- Student to teacher ratio: 12.63
- Colors: Kelly green and white
- Athletics conference: IHSAA 1A
- Nickname: Huskies
- Website: hansen.k12.id.us

Hansen High School is a high school in Hansen, Idaho, United States. It enrolled 141 students as of 2016.
