= Meadows Valley Junior/Senior High School =

Coordinates: 44°58′31″N 116°17′13″W

Location
- 500 North Miller Avenue; New Meadows, Idaho 83654; US

Information
- Type: Public
- Principal: Patrick Berg
- Teaching staff: 14.49 (FTE)
- Grades: K-12
- Enrollment: 136 (2023-2024)
- Student to teacher ratio: 9.39
- Colors: Black, orange, and white
- Mascot: Mountaineer
- IHSAA Division: 1A
- Website: http://mvsd11.org/

Meadows Valley Junior/Senior High School is a high school in New Meadows, Idaho.
