= Murtaugh High School =

Coordinates: 42°29′33″N 114°10′01″W

Location
- 500 West Boyd Street; Murtaugh, Idaho 83344; United States

Information
- Type: Public
- Principal: Rod Jones
- Staff: 8.36 (FTE)
- Faculty: 6
- Grades: K–12
- Enrollment: 102 (2024–2025)
- Student to teacher ratio: 12.20
- Colors: Red, white and black
- Athletics conference: IHSAA 1A division II
- Mascot: Red Devils
- Website: http://www.murtaugh.k12.id.us/

Murtaugh High School is a public high school in Murtaugh, Idaho, United States. It is a very small school with about 250 students in grades 9–12. It offers athletic programs for both girls and boys such as football, volleyball, basketball, and track. It also offers BPA, HOSA, and FFA. The extracurricular activities are minimal.
