= St. John Bosco Academy =

Location
- 122 Substation Road; Cottonwood, Idaho; United States; 46.065811°N 116.3555649°W

Information
- Type: Private
- Motto: Ever Higher (Excelsior)
- Established: 1997; 29 years ago
- Principal: Brian Cummings
- Staff: 10 (FTE)
- Grades: K–12
- Enrollment: 108 (2024–2025, K-12)
- Student to teacher ratio: 11
- Colors: Navy; Burgundy
- Athletics conference: 1A Whitepine League
- Mascot: Patriots
- Accreditation: Cognia
- Website: www.johnbosco.org

St. John Bosco Academy is a grade K-12 Private school located in Cottonwood, Idaho, United States.

== History ==
Originally founded in 1997 as Summit Academy, with the school's classroom located in a home basement, the school steadily grew from one teacher and 14 students from Kindergarten through 5th grade to graduating their first high school class in 2005. A new building was opened in 2002 with five classrooms, computer lab and gymnasium on 40 donated acres on the north end of Cottonwood. The school continued to expand with additions in 2014, 2020 and 2024. In 2017, the school received provisional affiliation with the Diocese of Boise. On July 1, 2019, the school changed its name to St. John Bosco Academy to better reflect their Catholic foundation. It was named after John Bosco, an Italian Catholic priest, educator and writer.

== Athletics ==
St. John Bosco Academy Patriots compete in the 1A division, the smallest division in the Idaho High School Activities Association (IHSAA). They participate in the District II Whitepines League.
