= North Gem High School =

Coordinates: 42°43′03″N 111°53′17″W

Location
- 360 S Main Street; Bancroft, Idaho 83217; United States

Information
- Type: Public
- Motto: Insuring our future by developing Character, Confidence, and Competence
- Established: 1932
- Oversight: North Gem School District #149
- Principal: Todd Shumway
- Teaching staff: 5.13 (FTE)
- Grades: 9-12
- Enrollment: 37 (2023–2024)
- Student to teacher ratio: 7.21
- Colors: Purple and White
- Mascot: Cowboy
- IHSAA Division: 1A
- Website: North Gem School District #149

North Gem High School is a high school in Bancroft, Idaho. Grades K-12 are located in the same facility.
