= Troy Junior/Senior High School =

Location
- 101 Trojan Drive; Troy, Idaho; United States; 46.747575°N 116.767746°W

Information
- Type: Public
- Established: 1893; 133 years ago, as Pioneer School
- School district: Troy School District #287
- Principal: Aaron Dail
- Staff: 11.75 (FTE)
- Grades: 7–12
- Enrollment: 151 (2024–2025)
- Student to teacher ratio: 12.85
- Colors: Orange; Black; White
- Athletics conference: 2A Whitepine League
- Mascot: Trojans
- Rivals: Genesee High School
- Accreditation: Northwest Accreditation Commission
- Yearbook: Trojan Torch
- Website: ths.troysd287.org

Troy Junior/Senior High School is a grade 7-12 Public School located in Troy, Idaho.

== History ==
Early maps, prior to 1890, shows a school located in the town of Vollmer, which later was renamed to Troy. Between 1891 and 1906, 15 school districts were formed in Troy and the surrounding communities. Each of these individual districts included a one-room schoolhouse offering students education from first to eighth grade. If a student was to continue into high school, they would attend the high school in Troy. Due to a growing student population, a new school was built in Troy in 1893, called the Pioneer School, and had 100 students and three teachers that first year. In 1906, a new larger multi-story brick school building was built and opened after voters approved a $12,000 (equivalent to $294,094 in 2024) bond to pay for the construction. Again in 1922, the number of students outgrew the building and additions were made, including a gymnasium and auditorium. The elementary grades were moved in 1939 to a new brick school constructed, with funds from the Public Works Administration, increasing the school's capacity. Following World War II, rural populations began to decline and the surrounded school districts began to merge. As the junior/senior high school building reached and exceed its ability to remain safe, the original 1906 building was replaced with a new junior-senior high school which was built and completed in time for the 2003 - 2004 school year.

== Athletics ==
Troy Trojans compete in the 2A division, the second-smallest division in the Idaho High School Activities Association (IHSAA). They participate in the District II Whitepine League. While not the oldest rivalry, their main rival is Genesee High School, also located in Latah County and 21 miles (34 km) south, and goes back to 1966; 60 years ago.

=== State championships ===
- Boys Basketball: 1958, 1960, 1963, 2005, 2008
- Boys Track: 1934
- Football (8-man): 2010
- Girls Basketball: 1991, 1992, 1994, 1996, 1998
- Volleyball: 1983, 1995, 1996, 1997, 1998, 1999, 2002, 2003, 2011, 2016, 2018, 2019, 2021, 2022
