= Clearwater Valley High School =

Coordinates: 46.14538°N 115.97764°W

Location
- Highway 13; Kooskia, Idaho 83539; United States

Information
- School type: Public High school
- School district: Clearwater Valley School District #245
- Staff: 15.46 (FTE)
- Grades: 9-12
- Gender: Mixed
- Enrollment: 234 (2021-22)
- Student to teacher ratio: 15:1
- Colors: Red, white and silver
- Mascot: Rams
- Website: www.sd245.org

Clearwater Valley High School is a high school located in Kooskia, Idaho. It belongs to Clearwater Valley School District #245. The school mascot is the Ram.

== Demographics ==
- Male Population: 99
- Female Population: 112
- Pupil / Teacher Ratio : 12.5

== Activities ==
There are many activities that are offered at Clearwater Valley. Sports include volleyball, football, boys and girls basketball, cross-country, wrestling, baseball, track and tennis. As for special clubs there is drama, FFA (Future Farmers of America), academic bowl, concert and pep band, and BPA (Business Professionals of America). During homecoming there are three special events that take place: Volley Puff which is where the boys play volleyball, Powder Puff where the girls play football, and the class competitions.

=== Special events ===
Special Events that occur during the school year is the Yearbook Signing Party, Veterans Day Assembly, Sadie Hawkins Dance, Food Drive, Christmas Show, Alumni Games, Shakespeare's Birthday, Mother/Daughter Tea, Prom, Junior/Senior BBQ, CVHS Olympics, Graduation, and Class Night.
