= Idaho City High School =

Coordinates: 43°49′53″N 115°49′59″W

Location
- 100 Centerville Road; Idaho City, Idaho 83631; U.S.

Information
- Type: Public
- Motto: "Educating Today's Children for Tomorrow's World"
- Established: 1995
- School district: Basin S.D. 72
- Superintendent: Tricia Kelly
- Principal: Jason Roeber TOSA
- Faculty: 12.18 (FTE)
- Grades: 7-12
- Enrollment: 145 (2023–2024)
- Student to teacher ratio: 11.90
- Colors: Navy blue and gold
- Mascot: Wildcat
- Nickname: Wildcats
- Newspaper: Newscast: Wildcat Weekly
- Yearbook: Wildcat Yearbook
- IHSAA Division: 1A
- Website: Idaho City H.S./M.S.

Idaho City High School is a high school in Idaho City in Boise County, Idaho. The school colors are navy and gold and the mascot is the wildcat.

== Sports/Fine Arts ==
- Football
- Volleyball
- Boys Basketball (Varsity and JV)
- Girls Basketball (Varsity and JV)
- Cross Country
- Track & Field
- Baseball
- Softball
- Cheerleading
- Music
- Theater
- Art
- Construction/Shop
- STEAM
