= Camas County High School =

Coordinates: 43°20′49″N 114°47′30″W

- 610 Soldier Rd. Fairfield, Idaho; United States

Information
- Type: Public
- School district: Camas County S.D. #121
- Principal: Janet Williamson
- Faculty: 12
- Teaching staff: 5.78 (FTE)
- Grades: 9–12
- Enrollment: 65 (2023–2024)
- Student to teacher ratio: 11.25
- Colors: Navy blue & gold
- Athletics: IHSAA Class 1A
- Athletics conference: Sawtooth
- Mascot: Musher
- Elevation: 5,065 ft (1,544 m) AMSL
- Website: www.camascountyschools.org

Camas County High School is a four-year public secondary school in Fairfield, Idaho. The school colors are navy blue and gold and the mascot is a Musher.

== Athletics ==
The Camas County Mushers compete in athletics in IHSAA Class 1A, Division II, the state's classification for its smallest schools. CCHS is a member of the Sawtooth Conference.

The volleyball team won its third consecutive state title in 2011, led by Katelyn Peterson (class of 2012), who played collegiately in the WAC for the Idaho Vandals.

=== State titles ===
Girls

- Volleyball (3): fall (1A, Div II) 2009, 2010, 2011 (introduced in 1976)
- Boys Basketball 1 1973
