= Wallace Junior/Senior High School =

Location
- 1 Miners Alley; Wallace, Idaho; United States; 47.4739991°N 115.9280740°W

Information
- Type: Public
- Established: 1892; 134 years ago
- School district: Wallace School District #393
- Principal: Donald Almquist
- Staff: 19.42
- Grades: 7–12
- Enrollment: 195
- Student to teacher ratio: 10.04
- Colors: Red; Black
- Athletics conference: 2A Scenic Idaho Conference
- Mascot: Miners
- Rivals: Kellogg High School
- Accreditation: Cognia
- Website: www.wsd393.org/o/wjhs

Wallace Junior/Senior High School is a combined Public junior and senior high school located in Wallace, Idaho.

== History ==
The first Wallace school was held in a wood-framed schoolhouse and in 1892, a new public brick school designed by W.A. Ritchie was built, which included grades K-12. Brick was used in an attempt to protect the school from fires that ravaged the town previously. Following the building of the new school, the original schoolhouse was converted to a guardhouse for a time, acting as a local jail. Due to significant town population growth, a large addition began on the school in 1901 with additional changes in 1908 and between 1927 and 1931. Being constructed of brick paid off as the school survived the Great Fire of 1910 that destroyed a third of the town. A new two-story high school was built in the early 1940s and a new gymnasium, named the Civic Auditorium, was built in 1946. During the 1970s and 1980s, graduation classes peaked in size between 90-100 and had been on a steady decline until the late 2000s when class sizes began to stabilize. The current 64,000 square foot junior/senior high school was completed in 2003 at the cost of $3.365 million (equivalent to $5,592,585 in 2024).

== Athletics ==
Wallace High School Miners compete in the 2A division, the second smallest division in the Idaho High School Activities Association (IHSAA). They participate in the District I Scenic Idaho Conference.

=== State championships ===
- Boys Golf: 1985
- Boys Track: 1930, 1932
- Girls Golf: 2005
- Volleyball: 1994
