= Eagle Academy (Eagle, Idaho) =

Coordinates: 43°41′41″N 116°20′13″W

- Eagle, Idaho; United States

Information
- Type: Public
- Established: 1998
- Principal: James Buschine
- Teaching staff: 13.50 (FTE)
- Grades: 9-12
- Enrollment: 190 (2023-2024)
- Student to teacher ratio: 14.07
- Colors: Gray and Maroon
- Mascot: Jaguar
- Website: Eagle Academy

Eagle Academy is an alternative high school in Eagle, Idaho, United States.
