= The Ambrose School =

Location
- 6100 N. Locust Grove Rd. Meridian, Idaho 83646; United States; 43°39′39″N 116°22′27″W

Information
- Type: Private, Classical Christian
- Motto: Take Every Thought Captive to Christ
- Religious affiliation: Christian
- Denomination: Protestant, evangelical
- Established: 1995; 31 years ago
- Headmaster: Wade Ortego
- Grades: K–12
- Enrollment: 930
- Campus type: Suburban
- Colors: Navy Blue & Gold
- Athletics: IHSAA Class 3A
- Athletics conference: Western Idaho Conference (3A)
- Mascot: Archers
- Accreditation: Association of Classical and Christian Schools
- Rival: Cole Valley Christian Schools
- Website: www.theambroseschool.org

The Ambrose School is a K-12 private, Christian school in Meridian, Idaho, United States. It follows the classical Christian education curriculum and is accredited by the Association of Classical Christian Schools. It teaches Latin in grades 3–10, Greek in grades 9–10, and emphasizes the Great Books of the Western World, grammar, logic, and rhetoric. The school operates as a 501(c)(3) Christian ministry.

== History ==
The Ambrose School opened in 1995 in Boise with three students under the name "Foundations Academy." The first graduating class was in 2006, when it had a total enrollment of 220 students. That year it renamed its high school to St. Ambrose Christian High School. Then, in 2008, the school became The Ambrose School, encompassing grades K-12. In 2009, The Ambrose School moved to its present location at 6100 N. Locust Grove in Meridian. The school had 544 students in grades K-12 in 2016. The Ambrose School now consists of three campuses: The Locust Grove Campus, The Bridge Campus, and The North Campus, with over 900 students across the campuses in the Treasure Valley.

The new campus was designed by Wayne Thowless, of LKV Architects. It was built in phases, the third phase beginning in 2012. With a designed capacity of up to 500 students, it features 25 rooms and labs, a regulation gymnasium, a playing field, a playground, and a "dramatic two-story library".

== Sports ==
The Ambrose School's team name is the "Archers". It is a member of the Idaho High School Activities Association's Western Idaho Conference, 2A classification.
