= Notus High School =

Coordinates: 43°44′09″N 116°47′49″W

Notus Jr./Sr. High School

Location
- 25257 Notus Road; Notus, Idaho 83607; US

Information
- Other name: Notus High School
- Type: Public
- School district: Notus School District 135
- Principal: Jen Wright
- Teaching staff: 14.52 (FTE)
- Grades: 7-12
- Enrollment: 144 (2023–2024)
- Student to teacher ratio: 9.92
- Colors: Royal blue and white
- Mascot: Pirate
- Nickname: Notus Pirates
- IHSAA Division: 1A
- Website: Notus Pirates

Notus Jr./Sr. School is a school located in Notus, Canyon County, Idaho. The school follows an educational structure that covers grades 7–9 (typical for a Middle School) and grades 10–12 (typical for a High School).

The enrolment by Grade numbers are: 26 (Grade 7); 23 (Grade 8); 22 (Grade 9); 20 (Grade 10); 26 (Grade 11); and 27 (Grade 12). 78 males and 66 females are enrolled at the school. 70.8% of the students are White, and 27% are Hispanic.

The school is a part of Notus School District 135, which also includes Notus Elementary school and Cossa Regional Technical Education Center. The principal of the school is Ms. Jen Wright.

== Shooting ==
On April 16, 1999, 15-year-old student Shawn Cooper entered Notus Jr./Sr. High School carrying a shotgun wrapped in a blanket. Once inside, he fired two shots that narrowly missed people before being subdued and arrested. Cooper was apparently experiencing a manic episode during the shooting. Nobody was harmed during the incident.
