= Shelley High School =

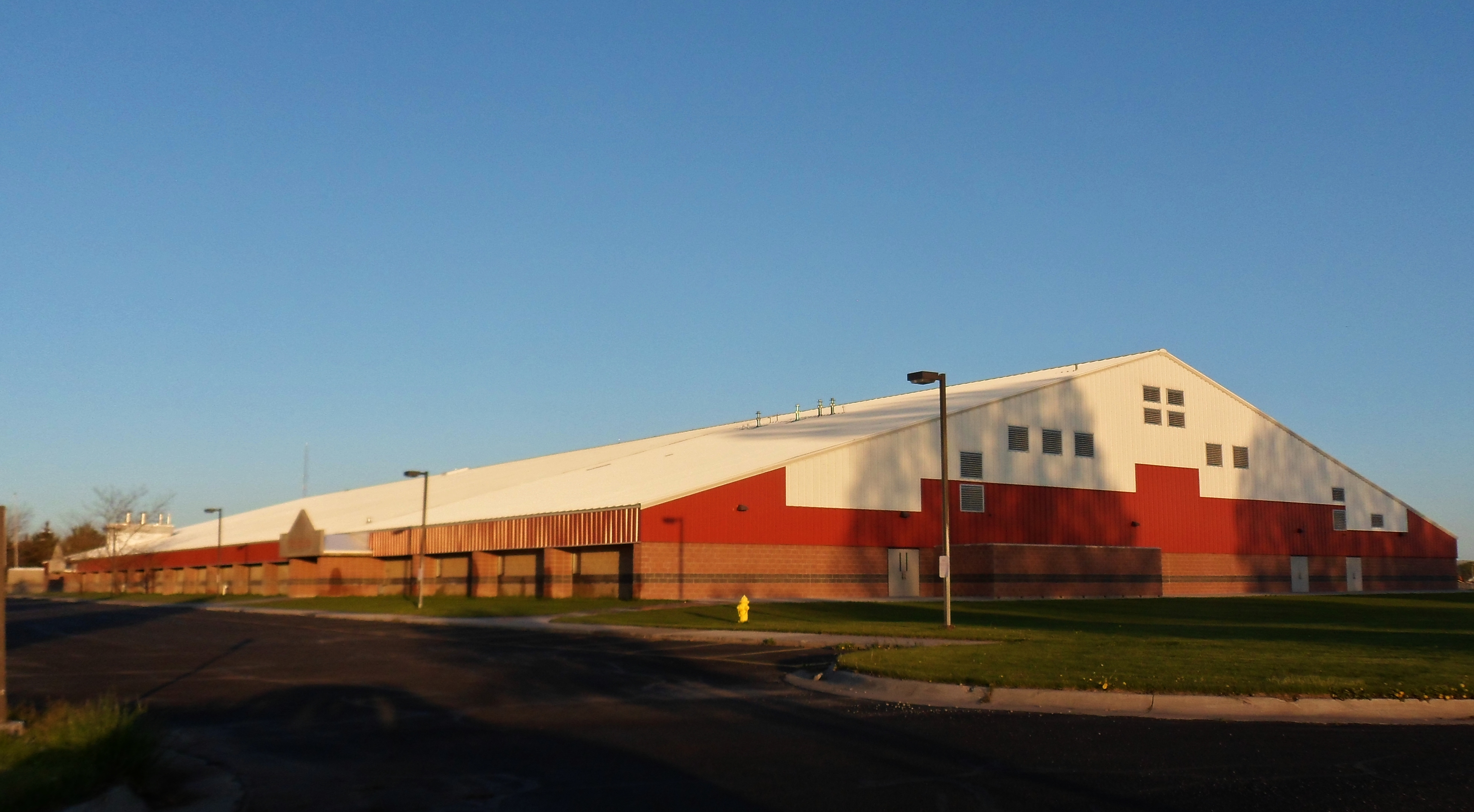

Location
- 570 West Fir Street; Shelley, Idaho 83274; United States
- Coordinates: 43°22′27″N 112°08′02″W

Information
- Type: Public
- Motto: "Where Students Come First"
- Principal: Burke Davis
- Teaching staff: 35.95 (FTE)
- Grades: 9-12
- Enrollment: 785 (2023–2024)
- Student to teacher ratio: 21.84
- Colors: Red, black, white
- Athletics conference: IHSAA Division 4A
- Mascot: King Russet
- Rival: Snake River High School
- Website: www.shelleyschools.org/1/home

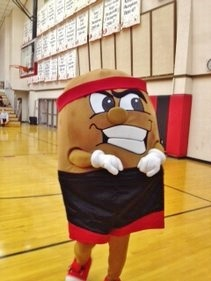
Shelley High School's Russet Potato mascot

Shelley High School is a public high school in the town of Shelley, Idaho, United States. It is part of the Shelley School District and the city's only high school. Nicknamed "the spud cellar" because of its resemblance to a potato cellar, the mascot King Russet is a Russet Burbank potato (the variety most commonly grown in the area), sometimes depicted with a scepter and crown.

== About ==
The approximately 600 students, called Russets, receive two weeks of break in late September because some of them work in the local potato harvest.

The school has done well academically. For example, the 10th grade student body surpassed the state averages on the 2011 Idaho Standards Achievement Test in language, reading, and mathematics. The class sizes (about 20 students per teacher) are a little above the state average of 18.

Shelley Senior High School has many sports teams including Basketball, Swimming, Softball, Baseball, Football, Wrestling, Track, Golf, Cheer, and Soccer. Despite its small size, the high school has won several state football championships in its division, including the 2003, 2005, 2007, 2009, 2012, and 2013 championships. The school also has many clubs including FFA, Key Club, Drama, BPA, Speech & Debate, Art Club, and Aca Deca.

A notable graduate from this school was Curt Brinkman, a world record setting paraplegic athlete who in 1980 became the first person to win the Boston Marathon in a wheelchair, and went on to win five gold medals in the Paralympic Games. The park across the street from the high school is named in his honor.

== Notable alumni ==
- Curt Brinkman, Paralympic athlete
- Darwin Young (1924–2020), farmer and politician
- Richard J Hobbs, 1984 NCAA Football National Champion
