= Firth High School =

Coordinates: 43°18′27″N 112°11′13″W

- 329 Lincoln Street; Firth, Idaho 83236; United States

Information
- Type: Public
- Principal: Keith Drake
- Teaching staff: 14.93 (FTE)
- Grades: 9-12
- Enrollment: 290 (2023–2024)
- Student to teacher ratio: 19.42
- Colors: Royal blue, white, black
- Mascot: Cougars
- IHSAA Division: 2A
- Website: Firth Cougars

Firth High School is a four-year public secondary school located in Firth, Idaho. The school colors are royal blue, white, and black. Firth has successful basketball, football, cross country, and track programs. The boys varsity basketball team won four straight Idaho state class 2A championships from 2007 to 2010. In 2013–2014, 2014–2015, and 2015-2016 the boys basketball team won the state championship again making it 7 in 10 years. In 2014 the girls basketball team won their first Championship since 1987 and the volleyball team was also crowned state champions that year Firth High school has many clubs, including Key Club, drama, FFA, FCCLA, and BPA.
