= Filer High School =

Location
- 3915 N Wildcat Way 2300 E Filer, Idaho; United States
- Coordinates: 42.56618°N 114.59456°W

Information
- Type: Public
- Principal: Shane Hild
- Staff: 29.16 (FTE)
- Grades: 9-12
- Enrollment: 500 (2024–2025)
- Student to teacher ratio: 17.15
- Colors: Red & white
- Mascot: Wildcat
- IHSAA Division: 3A
- Website: filerschools.org/schools/filer-high-school

Filer High School is a high school in Filer, Idaho, United States.
