= Thomas Jefferson Charter School =

Location
- 1209 Adam Smith Avenue; Caldwell, Idaho; United States
- Coordinates: 43.6598792087796°N 116.63890350972993°W

Information
- Type: Public Charter School
- Motto: Developing Virtuous Citizen Leaders
- Established: 2004; 22 years ago
- School district: Independent Charter District
- Principal: Amy Pfaff
- Staff: 23.5 (FTE)
- Grades: K–12
- Enrollment: 364 (2024–2025)
- Student to teacher ratio: 15.49
- Mascot: Patriots
- Accreditation: Idaho Public Charter School Commission
- Website: www.tjcs.org

Thomas Jefferson Charter School is a K-12 Public Charter School in Caldwell, Idaho.

== History ==
In the fall of 2003, the school received its approvals from the Vallivue School District and the Idaho State Department of Education. It welcomed the first students at the beginning of the 2004 school year in portable units. At the beginning of the 2006 - 2007 school year, the school moved to a new, 36,000 square foot building at their current location. In 2022, the school underwent an expansion, adding additional classrooms and restrooms.

== Success ==
A primary focus is to provide a niche for students who thrive in a small school environment centered on academic excellence and character. According to the 2026 US News and World Report rankings, Thomas Jefferson has the #1 rated elementary school in Idaho. The same rankings placed the middle school at #13 and the high school at #40. Due to this success, the school's potential student waitlist varies between 700 and 900 annually.

== Notable people ==
- Julie Yamamoto - Current board member and school's first administrator
