= West Side High School (Dayton, Idaho) =

Coordinates: 42°06′37″N 111°59′39″W

Location
- 755 N Westside Hwy. Dayton, Idaho 83232

Information
- Enrollment: 261 (2023-2024)
- Colors: 🟨 Maroon, white, gold
- Sports: Football, wrestling, volleyball, track and field, cross-country, boys' and girls' basketball
- Mascot: Pirate
- Team name: Pirates
- Website: West Side School District

West Side High School is a public high school in Dayton, Idaho, United States. It is part of the West Side School District.

West Side provides shop technology, business, computer, nursing, and Emergency Medical Technician classes. Students receive free college credits in partnership with the State of Idaho and through a local endowment. Many high school students are able to graduate with associate degrees.

The Dahle Community Arts Center is a 400-seat auditorium on campus that has hosted Glenn Beck, Voice Male, BYU Dance Team, Henrik Bothe, and the Bar J Wranglers.
