= Emmett High School =

Location
- 721 West 12th Street; Emmett, Idaho 83617; United States; 43°51′50″N 116°30′32″W

Information
- Type: Public
- School district: Emmett S.D. (#221)
- Principal: Bob Hyde
- Teaching staff: 29.41 (FTE)
- Grades: 9-12
- Enrollment: 737 (2023-2024)
- Student to teacher ratio: 25.06
- Colors: Blue and white
- Athletics: IHSAA Class 4A
- Athletics conference: Southern Idaho (4A)
- Nickname: Huskies
- Yearbook: Squaw Butte Saga
- Feeder schools: Emmett Middle School
- Elevation: 2,360 ft (720 m) AMSL
- Website: Emmett High School

Location in the United States

Emmett High School is a four-year public secondary school in Emmett, Idaho, the only traditional high school in the Emmett School District #221. The school colors are royal blue and white and the mascot is a husky. Red is the accent color.

== Athletics ==
Emmett competes in athletics in IHSAA Class 4A in the Southern Idaho Conference (4A).

ALL RECORDS ARE FROM THE IHSAA WEBSITE UNLESS OTHERWISE NOTED

=== Boys' Football ===
- 2015 4A State Football champions.

=== Boys' basketball ===
- 1940 Class A Boys' State Basketball Champions
- 1965 3A Boys' State Basketball Champions

=== Girls' basketball ===
- 2016 3A State Girls' Basketball Champions

=== Volleyball ===
- 1996 3A State Champions

=== Softball ===
- 2002 4A State Champions
- 2011 4A State Champions (introduced in 1997)

=== Baseball ===
- 1998 Boys' 4A State Champions

=== Boys' track ===
- 1945 One Class Boys' State Track Champions

=== Girls' track ===
- 1974 Class A State Track Champions
- 1981 3A State Track Champions
- 1983 3A State Track Champions
- 1997 A4 State Track Champions
- 2005 4A State Track Champions

=== Cross country ===
- 1995 A4 Boys’ State Cross Country Champion

=== Debate team records ===
- 1942 State Debate Champions

=== Drama team ===
2019 4A State Champions

== Notable alumni ==
- John Foruria, NFL defensive back, class of 1963
- Brad Little, governor of Idaho, class of 1972
