= Kuna High School =

Location
- 637 East Deer Flat Road; Kuna, Idaho; United States
- Coordinates: 43.502°N 116.406°W

Information
- Type: Public high school
- School district: Kuna Joint S.D. (#3)
- Principal: Reno
- Faculty: 88
- Grades: 9–12
- Enrollment: 1,624 (2024-2025)
- Colors: Black & Vegas Gold
- Athletics: IHSAA Class 5A
- Athletics conference: Southern Idaho (6A) (SIC)
- Mascot: Kaveman
- Newspaper: The Echo
- Feeder schools: Kuna Middle School Fremont Middle School
- Information: (208) 955-0200
- Elevation: 2,680 ft (820 m) AMSL
- Website: www.kunahigh.kunaschools.org

Kuna High School is a public high school in Kuna, Idaho, the only traditional high school in the Kuna Joint School District #3, located in southwest Ada County, west of Boise and south of Meridian. The school colors are black and gold and the mascot is a Kaveman.

== Athletics ==
Kuna competes in athletics in IHSAA Class 6A in the Southern Idaho Conference (6A) (SIC).
