= Priest River Lamanna High School =

Public school in Idaho, United States

Location
- 1103 9th Street; Priest River, Idaho; United States
- Coordinates: 48.18788°N 116.91559°W

Information
- Type: Public
- School district: West Bonner County District
- NCES School ID: 160000100084
- Principal: Matt George
- Teaching staff: 21.07
- Grades: 9-12
- Enrollment: 274 (2023-2024)
- Student to teacher ratio: 13.00
- Colors: Orange and Black
- Mascot: Spartan
- Newspaper: "The Shield"
- IHSAA Division: 3A
- Website: lam.sd83.org/

Priest River Lamanna High School is a high school in Priest River, Idaho.

Its former building, currently used by Priest River Junior High School, was added to the National Register of Historic Places in 1995.
