= Castleford High School =

Public school in Castleford, Idaho, United States

Location
- 500 Main Street; Castleford, Idaho 83321; United States; 42.5215°N 114.8755°W

Information
- School type: Public
- School district: Castleford School District
- Principal: Chuck Day
- Teaching staff: 20.75 (on FTE basis)
- Grades: 9-12
- Enrollment: 302 (2023-2024)
- Student to teacher ratio: 14.55
- Colors: Red, White, and Blue
- Athletics conference: IHSAA 1A
- Mascot: Wolves
- Website: https://castlefordschools.wordpress.com Castleford High School

Castleford High School also known as Castleford School is a public school located in the City of Castleford of Twin Falls County, Idaho, United States. It is part of Castleford School District. Approximately 20 miles (32 km) from the Twin Falls, Idaho, it is attended by students residing in Castleford and unincorporated communities within the western portion of Twin Falls County as well as a small portion of neighboring Owyhee County Students participate in IHSAA Conference 1A. In 2022, the school was recognized as a "Goal Maker" school by the Idaho State Department of Education.

== School history ==
According to Mike Cothern of Idaho Magazine, "The first school district organized in 1912 with around thirty students and a single teacher holding classes on the second floor of the Reynolds Hardware and Implement building. Two years later, a grade school was erected in Castleford; high school classes began in that structure's upstairs in 1921". The first class of seniors graduated in 1924, and the school's gymnasium was built in 1926.

Citizens passed a bond in 1949 to construct a high school building and a supplemental bond in 1951 to complete construction. Formal dedication of the original high school, located on Main Street, occurred in February 1952.

In 1960 the Board of Education consisted of George Blick, Art Reese, Minnie Kinyon, Clinton Quigely, B. P. Johnson, and Howard Barns. Floyd E. Bowers was the high school principal and the faculty members were Mrs. Hesseholt, Mr. Waite, Mrs. Haley, Mr. Heidel, Mr. Jackson, Mr. Marrs, Mr. Williamson, and Mr. Thomas.

In 2012 a teacher was sentenced to jail time for recording girls showering.

== Athletics ==
The Castleford Wolves participate in the following sports:

- Basketball
- Cross country
- Football
- Track
- Volleyball

In 2012, Castleford allowed Sierra Harr to participate on the boys golf team because there were not enough girls to field a team. Rival teams objected, and a rule change was proposed (and later rejected) by the Idaho High School Activities Association in an attempt to prevent her from playing on the boys team. With Harr, who hit from the same tees as the boys, the team won the state 2A title.

== State titles ==
=== State finalists ===
- Basketball
  - 2023 (1A)
- Girls golf, 2011.
- The school won the 2A boys golf championship in 2012.
