= Xavier Charter School =

Location
- 1218 N College W Rd; Twin Falls, Idaho 83301; United States
- 42.584778°N 114.461120°W

Information
- School type: Charter (K-12)
- Motto: Vivere Est Cogitare
- Established: 2007
- Oversight: Idaho Public Charter School Commission
- Principal: Gary Moon
- Grades: K–12
- Enrollment: Approximately 640
- Average class size: 33
- Colors: Maroon, Gold
- Mascot: Phoenix
- Website: Xavier Charter School

Xavier Charter School is a public charter school in Twin Falls, Idaho.

== History ==
Xavier Charter School opened in 2007 offering kindergarten through eighth grade classes. A ninth grade class was added for the 2008–09 school year, and an eleventh grade was added for the 2009– 10 school year. and an additional grade will be added each year with the first high school class graduating in 2011. The school currently has grades K–12. As of July 2026, it is ranked 31st within Idaho by U.S. News and World Report.
