= Riverstone International School =

Coordinates: 43°33′53″N 116°06′54″W

- 5521 Warm Springs Ave. Boise, Idaho; Boise, Idaho 83716; United States

Information
- Type: Private, day and boarding
- Established: 1997
- Head of school: John Gasparini
- Faculty: 96 (teachers plus faculty)
- Grades: Preschool-12
- Enrollment: 425 students
- Campus size: 14 acres
- Houses: Riverstone house (boarding program)
- Colors: Blue, White
- Mascot: Ollie the Otter
- Website: Riverstone International School

Riverstone International School is a private, independent school for preschool through high school students in Boise, Idaho that offers day and boarding programs. Riverstone was the first International Baccalaureate World School in Idaho and is one of a small number of schools in the United States to offer all three IB programs, the Primary Years Programme (PYP), Middle Years Programme (MYP), and the Diploma Programme (DP). The school’s Five Pillars—Academic Excellence, Community and Service, Leadership by Example, International Understanding and Outdoor Education—provide pathways for students to explore academically and personally. Students raft the Main Payette River and Main Salmon River and backpack through the White Cloud and Sawtooth Mountains. The school's boarding program enrolls a maximum of 30 students from the U.S. and around the world. The school community as a whole includes representation from 45+ countries, including Australia, Bulgaria, China, Ethiopia, France, Germany, India, Italy, Korea, Mexico, Russia, Spain, Ukraine and Vietnam. Riverstone is a Malone Family Foundation supported school.

Riverstone International School is a not-for-profit organization under the Internal Revenue Code Classification 501(c)(3).

== History ==
Riverstone International School was established in 1997 under the name Hidden Springs Community School. Located just north of Boise, Idaho, the school opened its doors with 57 students enrolled in kindergarten through eighth grade. In 1998, enrollment in the Elementary School increased and the beginnings of the High School, grade nine, was established. In 2000, the school moved from Dry Creek Valley (Idaho) to its current location in southeast Boise and changed its name to Riverstone Community School. The school was housed in an old Forest Service building and three modular buildings that were built by the school.

By the fall of 2001 enrollment had increased to 130 and an additional building was added. The school was accredited by the Northwest Commission on Colleges and Universities (previously the "Northwest Association of Schools and Colleges and Universities (NASCU)") and the State of Idaho. In that same year the School approached the International Baccalaureate (IB) to begin the authorization process that would permit the School to offer the IB Diploma Programme. In the 2002-2003 school year, grade ten was added and enrollment reached 170. The School's first international exchange students arrived in 2002. These students came from Russia, Thailand, Germany, Brazil, Spain, Chile, and Colombia. In 2003, the School's enrollment increased to 235 students, including nineteen international students. Eleventh grade was added, additional property was purchased adjacent to the existing plot and the School broke ground on a new elementary school.

Grade twelve was added in 2004 and the IB Diploma Programme was authorized for grades eleven and twelve. In 2005, the School became an accredited member of the Pacific Northwest Association of Independent Schools (PNAIS). The school changed its name to Riverstone International School in 2006. In 2009, Riverstone was granted authorization to offer the Primary Years Program and Middle Years Program and began offering a dual language, Spanish and English, full-day preschool. Riverstone received the Idaho Governor's Brightest Stars Award for Schools in 2009. In 2010 the school built an Elementary School building, which also houses the administrative staff.

In 2012, Riverstone was selected as Idaho’s only Malone Family Foundation School.

In 2016, the school established a boarding program for students in grades 9-12 and opened a dormitory, Riverstone House, in downtown Boise. That same year, the school broke ground on Phase One of a new Middle and High School building. The building opened in January 2017 with two music rooms and three science classrooms, including a wet laboratory and dry laboratory, and college counselor’s office.

== Sports ==
Riverstone has athletic teams in their Middle and High Schools for volleyball, basketball, soccer, swimming, cross country and track.

Volleyball and basketball The girls volleyball team and girls and boys basketball teams compete in the Western Idaho Conference (WIC). The volleyball team competes in the fall and basketball in the winter. The teams typically practice after school at 3:30 p.m., and the seasons last about six to eight weeks. Riverstone provides transportation to and from the games.

Cross country and track & field The girls and boys Cross Country and Track & Field teams compete in the Western Idaho Conference (WIC). The Cross Country team competes in the fall and Track & Field team in the spring.

Ski and Snowboard Riverstone students can compete in the Middle and High School race series held at Bogus Basin Mountain Recreation Area. Final competitions take place during the Dotty Clark races in February.

Soccer The co-ed soccer team competes in the Idaho Rush league during the fall and spring seasons.

Swimming Riverstone students, both girls and boys, compete on a cooperative team with Timberline High School. The season starts in mid-August and continues through early November, culminating in the state swimming championships that students qualify for based on their competition times.
