= Bonners Ferry High School =

Location
- 6485 Tamarack Lane; Bonners Ferry, Idaho; United States
- Coordinates: 48.68°N 116.326°W

Information
- Type: Public
- School district: Boundary County S.D. (#101)
- NCES District ID: 1600420
- NCES School ID: 160042000089
- Principal: Lisa Iverson
- Teaching staff: 25.04 (FTE)
- Grades: 9-12
- Enrollment: 428 (2023–2024)
- Student to teacher ratio: 17.09
- Colors: Navy blue and white
- Athletics: IHSAA Class 4A
- Athletics conference: Intermountain League
- Mascot: Badger
- Yearbook: Badger Tales
- Website: www.bfhs-bcsd-id.schoolloop.com

Bonners Ferry High School is a four-year public secondary school in Bonners Ferry, Idaho. The only traditional high school in the Boundary County School District #101, it serves all of Boundary County, the northernmost in the state. The approximately 500 students come from an area larger than the state of Rhode Island. The school colors are navy blue and white and the mascot is a badger.
