= Clark Fork Junior/Senior High School =

Coordinates: 48°08′49″N 116°10′33″W

Location
- 121 East 4th Avenue; Clark Fork, Idaho 83811; United States

Information
- Type: Public
- School district: Lake Pend Oreille S.D.
- Principal: Phil Kemink
- Teaching staff: 8.60 (FTE)
- Grades: 7–12
- Enrollment: 129 (2023-2024)
- Student to teacher ratio: 15.00
- Colors: Royal Blue and Gold
- Mascot: Wampus Cats
- IHSAA Division: 1A
- Website: Clark Fork Jr/Sr H.S.

Clark Fork Junior/Senior High School is a six-year secondary school in Clark Fork, Idaho.

== Academic decathlon ==
Clark Fork's Academic Decathlon team competes in the small schools division in Idaho. In 2006, the first year it fielded a team, it took third place. In 2007 the team took second place and in 2008 they were the state champions in Boise Idaho.

== Mascot ==
Wampus Cat from 1935 drawing

The school mascot is a Wampus Cat, a yellow cougar with a spiked ball on its tail. The legend of the Wampus Cat, as told by the school:

The quiet town of Clark Fork is home to one of the most enduring legends of Bonner County – the Wampus Cat. The fearsome feline has been the trademark of Clark Fork High School for 75 years, ever since the school's basketball team adopted the carnivorous cat as its own. But the tale of the Wampus Cat is rooted in legends of the Indians who once lived in the Clark Fork Valley.

The Indians who lived in the valley told of a wild cat that was often seen stalking its prey along the banks of the Clark Fork River. The cat resembled a cougar, except for a ball-like formation at the end of its tail. Some stories of the cat reported that the ball was covered with sharp quills, or spikes.

When the cat approached his prey, he would begin to swing his tail, striking down his victim. The slow, but deadly, cat was given the name “Wampus Cat” by the Indians. Like the Wampus Cat of original legend, the Clark Fork High School Wampus Cat has become known as a fierce contender in battle and a sure conqueror of its prey.

== Notable alumni ==
- Ron Heller, NFL tight end (1987-92), class of 1981
