= Snake River High School =

Location
- 922 West Highway 39; Blackfoot, Idaho 83221; United States
- Coordinates: 43°11′49″N 112°28′47″W

Information
- Type: Public high school
- School district: Snake River School District
- Principal: Ray Carter
- Teaching staff: 40.80 (FTE)
- Grades: 9–12
- Enrollment: 603 (2023–2024)
- Student to teacher ratio: 14.78
- Colors: Purple, white and black
- Athletics conference: IHSAA Division 4A
- Mascot: Panthers
- Rival: Shelley High School; Blackfoot High School
- Website: srhs.snakeriver.org

Snake River High School is a high school near Blackfoot, Idaho. The school has an enrollment of 608 (2022–23) and Ray Carter is the principal.
