= Liberty Charter School =

Location
- 9955 Kris Jensen Lane; Nampa, Idaho 83686; United States
- Coordinates: 43°30′59″N 116°33′33″W

Information
- Type: Public charter high school
- Principal: Rebecca Stallcop
- Faculty: 17.40 (on an FTE basis)
- Grades: K-12
- Enrollment: 396 (2023–24)
- Student to teacher ratio: 22.76
- Colors: Navy, white, and red
- Mascot: Patriot
- IHSAA Division: 1A
- Website: www.libertycharterschool.com

Liberty Charter School is a public charter high school in Nampa, Idaho, United States.

This school was the first to embrace the Harbor Method of teaching, which is now being adopted by other schools in the state.
