= Alturas Preparatory Academy =

School in Idaho Falls, Idaho, US

Location
- 2280 E 17th Street; Idaho Falls, Idaho; United States; 43.4787684049°N 111.9891757646°W

Information
- Type: Public Charter School
- Established: 2021; 5 years ago
- School district: Independent Charter District
- Principal: Reece Drkula
- Staff: 27.8 (FTE)
- Grades: 6–12
- Enrollment: 463 (2024–2025)
- Student to teacher ratio: 16.65
- Colors: Purple; Blue
- Athletics conference: 2A High Desert Conference
- Mascot: Pumas
- Accreditation: Idaho Public Charter School Commission
- Website: alturasacademy.org/our-school/alturas-preparatory-academy/

Alturas Preparatory Academy is a grade 6-12 Public Charter School in Idaho Falls, Idaho.

== History ==
The school is housed in a renovated, 73,000 square feet (6,800 m^{2}), former Sears department store at the Grand Teton Mall. Donations and a grant from the J.A. and Kathryn Albertson Foundation allowed for the purchase and renovation of the space. The first students were welcomed at the beginning of the 2021 - 2022 school year. It opened with around 300 students with just grades 6-10, adding 11th and 12th grades over the following two years.

Alturas is located within the Idaho Falls School District boundaries and also pulls from the Bonneville School District and the Shelley Joint School Districts. It is currently the only authorized International Baccalaureate World School in eastern Idaho.

== Athletics ==
The Pumas compete in the IHSSAA District VI 2A High Desert Conference.
