= Salmon River Junior/Senior High School =

Salmon River Junior / Senior High School

Location
- 711 Ace’s Place; Riggins, Idaho; United States; 45.418633613°N 116.319519954°W

Information
- Type: Public
- Established: 1940; 86 years ago
- School district: Salmon River Joint School District #243
- Principal: Kyle Ewing
- Staff: 8.65 (FTE)
- Grades: 6–12
- Enrollment: 81 (2024–2025)
- Student to teacher ratio: 9.36
- Colors: Royal Blue; Gold
- Athletics conference: 1A Long Pin Conference
- Mascot: Savages
- Accreditation: Northwest Accreditation Commission (Cognia)
- Website: www.jsd243.org

Salmon River Jr / Sr High School is a grade 6-12 Public school in Riggins, Idaho.

== History ==
The first area school was established in 1894 in a log cabin with 14 students in grades 1 - 8. Over the next 45 years, several schools were built but, until 1940, students attended grades 1 - 10 in Riggins and then traveled 30 miles to White Bird for 11th and 12th grades. In 1940, an $8,000 (equivalent to $139,811 in 2024) bond was passed and construction began on the new Riggins School, with students helping with sitework and construction, and was officially dedicated on November 2, 1940. That year had 99 total students, including 40 students between the 8th and 12th grades. Seven students graduated in the Riggins High School inaugural graduating class of 1941. Due to increasing class sizes, a new high school was built and opened in 1958. It was known as Salmon River High School and is still in use as the high school today. The original high school was converted to an elementary school and was added to the National Historic Register in 2024

== Athletics ==
Salmon River competes in the 1A division, the smallest division in the Idaho High School Activities Association. They participate in the District III Long Pin Conference.

=== State championships ===
- Football (8-man): 1999, 2007, 2009, 2012, 2013, 2015, 2016
- Boys Basketball: 2013, 2014
- Girls Basketball: 1977

== Mascot ==
The original Riggins High School mascot was the Buckaroos, from 1940 until 1954, when it was changed to the Savages, which continued on as the Salmon River High School Savages. The history of the Savages name comes from the loggers in parts of Montana and Idaho who became known as the "Cedar Savages." In 2001, a new logo was created in collaboration with the Nez Perce tribe to include an arrowhead between the letters S and R. The Nez Perce also paid for murals to be painted in the school gym.

== Notable people ==
- Cindy Carlson - Idaho state politician
- Dan Cummins - Comedian
- Priscilla Giddings - Idaho state politician
- Charlie Shepherd - Former Salmon River football coach and Idaho state politician
- Leighton Vander Esch - NFL football player
