= Canyon Springs High School (Caldwell, Idaho) =

School in Caldwell, Idaho, United States

Location
- 1502 Filmore Street, Caldwell ID; Caldwell, Canyon, Idaho 83605; United States; 43°40′03″N 116°40′45″W

Information
- School type: Alternative highschool
- Motto: We are dedicated to recognizing the unique strengths and challenges of our students while inspiring them to embrace learning at high levels as they progress through a personalized journey, equipping them for a successful future.
- School district: Caldwell School District
- Principal: Shelli Rambo
- Teaching staff: 24.30 (FTE)
- Grades: 9-12
- Gender: All
- Average class size: 5-25
- Colors: Purple and Orange
- Mascot: Tigers
- Website: can.caldwellschools.org

Canyon Springs High School is an alternative high school in Caldwell, Idaho. It is operated by the Caldwell School District. The school building was constructed circa 1948 as part of President Roosevelt's "New Deal" agenda. Today, the school building is used as an alternative to Caldwell High School. CSHS exists to help struggling students who struggle in typical schooling environments. As such, the school features strategies to help students with specific needs.
