= Garden Valley High School =

Coordinates: 44°05′29″N 115°57′26″W

Location
- 1053 Banks Lowman Road; Garden Valley, Idaho 83622; United States

Information
- Type: Public
- Teaching staff: 19.50 (FTE)
- Grades: PK-12
- Enrollment: 253 (2023–2024)
- Student to teacher ratio: 12.97
- Colors: Purple and gold
- Mascot: Wolverines
- IHSAA Division: 1A
- Website: Garden Valley Wolverines

Garden Valley High School is a high school in Garden Valley, Idaho.

== History ==
Early in Garden Valley history there were three elementary schools scattered throughout the region. There was no high school located in Boise County, so until 1926 any children wishing to continue their education past the eighth grade would board at the high school in Emmett, Idaho; a distance of around fifty miles (80 km).

In 1926, Garden Valley attempted to build its first high school on School House Gulch Rd. Upon completing construction, the building soon caught fire and the first year of school was held in a local granary. However, they were able to rebuild the school at a different site, at 1076 Banks Lowman Hwy, and at that site the school would sit until the fall of 2009. Garden Valley's high school was the first in Boise County until 1990, when Horseshoe Bend opened up a second high school. The high school was built eight years before the town of Crouch was founded in 1934. In 1930, Garden Valley High School graduated its first class.

This first high school building remained at its location until 1964, when it was sold to a private owner and moved off the site to make way for a new school in 1965. That school slowly grew into a web of modules that eventually incorporated all the different elementary schools in the area, excepting the schoolhouse located in Lowman; although students from Lowman still attended high school at Garden Valley.

Garden Valley School District encompasses around 287 square miles (740 km^{2}) in the northeast corner of Boise County. Once opened, the high school's population has slowly grown in proportion to Boise County. Although class sizes shrank with the opening of both Horseshoe Bend HS in 1990 and Idaho City HS in 1995, today they hover around 22 students per class.

With the opening of the new school in 2009, Garden Valley School District finally consolidated all the outlying buildings, excepting Lowman School, into one structure. This new structure was paid for with bonds and grants and had at least one add-on, the Wrestling Room, "donated" at cost by local construction companies.

The new structure is relatively technologically advanced with Smart Boards in all the classrooms. There is also a bio-mass boiler which will heat the school at considerable reduced cost from a traditional electric system. Like many "advanced" things in the school, they were paid for partially with grants and federal money.
