= Payette High School =

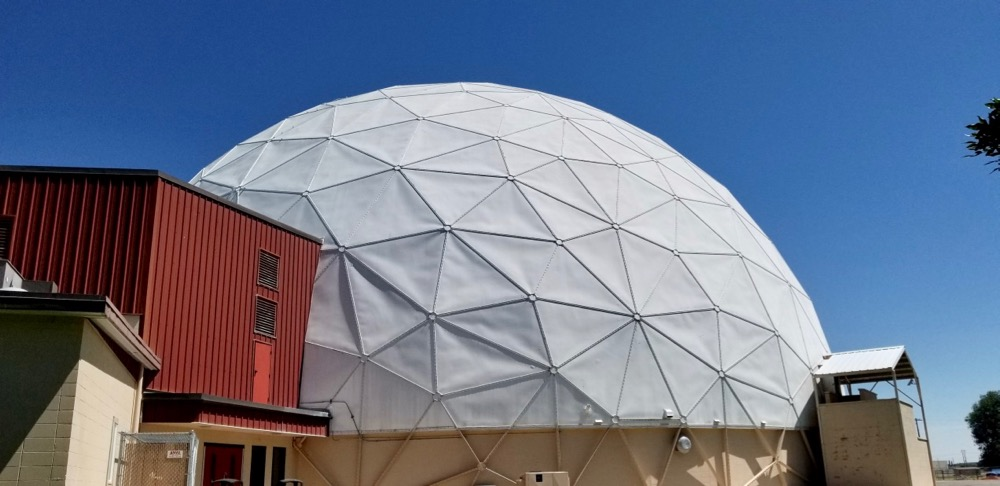
- Payette High School gym

Location
- 1500 6th Avenue South; Payette, Idaho 83661; United States; 44°04′01″N 116°55′33″W

Information
- Type: Public
- Principal: Kurtis Taylor
- Teaching staff: 22.71 (FTE)
- Grades: 9–12
- Enrollment: 364 (2023-2024)
- Student to teacher ratio: 16.03
- Colors: Red, black, and white
- Mascot: Pirate
- IHSAA Division: 3A
- Website: Payette High School

Location in the United States
Location in Idaho

Payette High School is a public high school in the western United States, located in Payette, Idaho. It is well known for its large domed gymnasium, a former radar dome from the closed Baker Air Force Station in eastern Oregon; it was moved to PHS in the early 1970s.

== Performing arts ==
Payette High School is the home of Pirate Theatre Company; it also offers several music classes: Choir, Marching Band, Concert Band, and Jazz Band.

== Notable alumni ==
- Harmon Killebrew - class of 1954 - Hall of Fame Major League Baseball player (1959–75)
- Jim McClure - class of 1942 - U.S. Senator (1973–91), U.S. House (1967–73)
- Sting Ray Robb - class of 2019 - racing driver
