= Parma High School =

Coordinates: 43°47′23″N 116°56′05″W

Location
- 137 Panther Way; Parma, Idaho 83660; United States

Information
- Type: Public
- Teaching staff: 18.92 (FTE)
- Grades: 9–12
- Enrollment: 330 (2023-2024)
- Student to teacher ratio: 17.44
- Colors: Black, red, and white
- Mascot: Panther
- IHSAA Division: 3A
- IHSAA conference: Western Idaho Conference
- Website: Parma H.S.

Parma High School is a high school in Parma, Idaho.
