= Kootenai Junior/Senior High School =

Coordinates: 47°23′57″N 116°40′13″W

- 13030 E. O'Gara Road Harrison, Idaho 83833; United States

Information
- Type: Public
- NCES District ID: 1601740
- CEEB code: 130280
- NCES School ID: 160174000303
- Principal: Jacob Williams
- Teaching staff: 9.93 (FTE)
- Grades: 6-12
- Enrollment: 111 (2024–2025)
- Student to teacher ratio: 11.18
- Colors: Red & white
- Mascot: Warrior
- Website: hs.sd274.com

Kootenai Junior/Senior High School is a rural public secondary school located 7 miles south of Harrison, Idaho, serving families on the eastern side of Lake Coeur d'Alene to the State Highway 3 corridor between Rose Lake and Saint Maries.

The school formerly housed 7-12th grades in a single building, built in 1957 at the E. O'Gara Road location, but an additional building was added in 2003 to provide separate facilities for upper and lower grades. Harrison Elementary School has been at the E. O'Gara Road location since 1985, making it almost as old as some of the teachers who work there.
