= Glenns Ferry High School =

Coordinates: 42.958°N 115.309°W

Location
- 639 N. Bannock St. Glenns Ferry, Idaho; U.S.

Information
- Type: Public, four-year
- School district: Glenns Ferry S.D. (#192)
- Principal: Rob Spriggs
- Teaching staff: 9.63 (FTE)
- Grades: 9–12
- Enrollment: 127 (2023–2024)
- Student to teacher ratio: 13.19
- Colors: Orange & Black
- Athletics: IHSAA Class 1A
- Athletics conference: Snake River
- Mascot: Pilot
- Yearbook: Trailblazer
- Feeder schools: Glenns Ferry; Middle School
- Information: (208) 366-7434
- Elevation: 2,580 ft (790 m) AMSL
- Website: Glenns Ferry H.S.

Glenns Ferry High School is a four-year public secondary school in Elmore County, Idaho, located in the city of Glenns Ferry.

With 140 students in four grades, GFHS has the second highest enrollment in the county, behind Mountain Home High School. The school colors are orange and black and its mascot is a pilot.

== Athletics ==
Glenns Ferry competes in athletics in IHSAA Class 1A in the Snake River Conference,

=== State titles ===
Boys

- Football (2): fall (A-3, now 2A) 1994, 1995 (official with introduction of A-3 playoffs in fall 1977)1981 Boys Basketball

== Notable alumni ==
- Korey Hall – NFL fullback – Green Bay Packers/New Orleans Saints
