= Homedale High School =

Location
- 203 E Idaho Avenue; Homedale, Idaho 83628; United States; 43°37′05″N 116°55′50″W

Information
- Type: Public
- School district: Homedale School District
- Principal: Matt Holtry
- Teaching staff: 20.61 (FTE)
- Grades: 9-12
- Enrollment: 410 (2023–2024)
- Student to teacher ratio: 19.89
- Colors: Red and white
- Mascot: Trojan
- IHSAA Division: 3A
- Website: hhs.homedaleschools.org

Homedale High School is a public high school located in Homedale, Idaho, serving students in grades 9-12. During the 2008–09 academic year, the school had an enrolment of approximately 332 students.
