= Timberline High School (Weippe, Idaho) =

Location
- 22869 Highway 11; Weippe, Idaho; U.S. 46°26′07″N 115°53′14″W

Information
- Type: Public
- Established: 1969
- School district: Orofino J.S.D. #171
- Principal: Jason Hunter
- Faculty: 7
- Grades: 6–12
- Enrollment: 113 (2023–2024)
- Colors: Black & gold
- Athletics: IHSAA Class 1A
- Athletics conference: White Pine League
- Mascot: Spartan
- Website: www.sd171.k12.id.us/ths/index.html

Timberline Schools are a combined elementary and secondary school in Clearwater County, Idaho. Midway between Weippe and Pierce on Highway 11, the schools are operated by the Orofino Joint School District #171, headquartered to the west in Orofino. The school colors are black and gold, and the mascot is a Spartan.

The school was originally established as a high school. In 1969, a merger of the high schools of the two towns, which dissolved the long-time athletic rivalry between the Pierce Foresters and Weippe Gorillas. In 1979, the Pierce elementary building was built near the high school. In 2007, the Pierce and Weippe elementary schools combined at Timberline. After Timberline opened, the gorilla mascot stayed in Weippe until the junior high closed and moved to Timberline in 1989. A gorilla caricature and large "W" adorn the 76-foot (23 m) high water tower in Weippe in the WHS school colors, red and black. Painted over in 2002, it returned five years later after extended civic debate.

One of five schools in the school district, THS currently enrolls 70 students in grades 9–12, and about 80 in kindergarten through sixth grade. The school is located only 8 miles from Pierce, Idaho—the oldest city in Idaho.

== Athletics ==
Timberline competes in athletics in IHSAA Class 1A in the White Pine League.

The Weippe Gorillas won two state titles in boys basketball, in 1961 and 1969.

=== Venues ===
The athletic facilities on the THS campus include the gymnasium and weight room. The outdoor athletic venues include the football field and a track.

=== State titles ===
Boys

- Basketball (2): (A, now 1A) 1961; (A-4, now 1A) 1969 (both as Weippe H.S.)
