= Coeur d'Alene Charter Academy =

Public high school in Idaho, United States

Location
- 4904 N. Duncan Drive; Coeur d'Alene, Idaho 83815; United States; 47.715997°N 116.796261°W

Information
- Type: Comprehensive Public High School
- Established: 1999
- School district: 491
- NCES School ID: 160017300765
- Principal: Stacey Peppin
- Grades: 6–12
- Enrollment: 672 (2019-2020)
- Student to teacher ratio: 19.24
- Campus type: divided middle school building and high school.
- Colors: Red, white and blue
- Mascot: Panthers
- Newspaper: The Stall Street Journal
- Website: www.cdacharter.org

Coeur d’Alene Charter Academy is a public charter school serving students in grades 6–12 in Coeur d’Alene, Idaho. The Academy emphasizes academic rigor, subject mastery, and preparation for college. In 2025, U.S. News & World Report ranked it first among Idaho high schools and 64th nationally.

== Overview ==
Recognized by the Idaho State Board of Education as an accredited school, Coeur d’Alene Charter Academy opened in August 1999 with students in grades 7–10. The school added grade 11 in the 2000–2001 academic year and grade 12 in 2001–2002, celebrating its first graduating class that spring. The addition of grade 6 in 2002–2003 established the Academy’s current grade configuration.

The Academy was founded by Dr. William “Bill” Proser, who served as principal during its inaugural year. He continued teaching high school English and economics until his retirement in June 2017.

== Academic Mission & Philosophy ==
The Academy’s mission is to provide a “rigorous, content-rich college preparatory education for any students who are willing to accept the challenge.”

Its academic approach emphasizes demonstrated mastery of subject matter, with grades reflecting achievement measured against established standards. Challenging coursework develops both foundational knowledge and higher-order reasoning skills, while encouraging students to build strong study habits, perseverance, and independence. These expectations support the Academy’s goal of preparing students for success in higher education and adult life.

== Athletics and Extracurricular Activities ==
Alongside its academic program, the Academy offers opportunities for students to explore their interests through athletics, clubs, and academic organizations.

Athletic offerings include cross country, high school boys’ and girls’ soccer, middle school volleyball, tennis, and track and field.

Student clubs include American Sign Language, Japanese Language, Knitting, Gaming, and Skeet & Trap, among others. Academic activities include National Science Bowl, Speech & Debate, National Junior Honor Society, National Honor Society, STEM Club, and MATHCOUNTS. Together, these programs give students opportunities to develop skills, collaborate with peers, and participate in school life beyond the classroom.

The Academy’s students have earned championship titles in athletics, performing arts, and academic competitions. The boys’ soccer team won the 4A state championship in 2025, while the girls’ soccer team claimed 3A state titles in 2014 and every year from 2016 through 2020. The drama program earned seven consecutive 3A state championships from 2019 through 2025. In academic competition, the Academy’s National Science Bowl team won regional championships from 2009 through 2011 and again in 2016.

== Distinguished alumna ==
- Emily Ruskovich, Class of 2004, O. Henry Award Winner and New York Times Bestselling Author
