= List of school districts in Idaho =

This is a complete list of school districts of in the state of Idaho.

All Idaho school districts are independent governmental agencies. Idaho does not have any public school systems directly managed by another layer of government.

== Ada County ==
- Boise School District#1
- Kuna Joint School District#3
- West Ada School District#2

== Adams County ==
- Council School District#13
- Meadows Valley Public School District#11

== Bannock County ==
- Marsh Valley Joint School District#21
- Pocatello/Chubbuck School District#25

Shoshone-Bannock School District #537 (operator of Shoshone-Bannock Jr./Sr. High School) is listed as a school district by the state, but it does not geographically include any area in Bannock County.

== Benewah County ==
- Plummer-Worley Joint School District#44
- Saint Maries Joint School District#41

== Bingham County ==
- Aberdeen School District #58
- Blackfoot School District #55
- Firth School District#59
- Shelley Joint School District#60
- Snake River School District#52

== Blaine County ==
- Blaine County School District #61

== Boise County ==
- Basin School District #72
- Garden Valley School District#71
- Horseshoe Bend School District#73

== Bonner County ==
- Lake Pend Oreille School District#84
- West Bonner County School District#83

== Bonneville County ==
- Bonneville Joint School District#93
- Idaho Falls School District#91
- Swan Valley Elementary School District#92

== Canyon County ==
- Caldwell School District#132
- Melba Joint School District#136
- Middleton School District#134
- Nampa School District#131
- Notus School District#135
- Parma School District#137
- Vallivue School District#139
- Wilder School District#133

== Caribou County ==
- Grace Joint School District#148
- North Gem School District#149
- Soda Springs Joint School District#150

== Cassia County ==
- Cassia County Joint School District #151

== Custer County ==
- Challis Joint School District#181
- Mackay Joint School District#182

== Elmore County ==
- Glenns Ferry Joint School District#192
- Mountain Home School District #193
- Prairie Elementary School District#191

== Franklin County ==
- Preston Joint School District#201
- West Side Joint School District#202

== Fremont County ==
- Fremont County Joint School District#215

== Gooding County ==
- Bliss Joint School District #234
- Gooding Joint School District#231
- Hagerman Joint School District#233
- Wendell School District#232

== Idaho County ==
- Cottonwood Joint School District#242
- Mountain View School District #244
- Salmon River Joint School District#243

== Jefferson County ==
- Jefferson County School District #251
- Ririe Joint School District#252
- West Jefferson School District#253

== Jerome County ==
- Jerome Joint School District#261
- Valley School District#262

== Kootenai County ==
- Coeur d'Alene School District#271
- Kootenai School District#274
- Lakeland Joint School District#272
- Post Falls School District#273

== Latah County ==
- Genesee Joint School District#282
- Kendrick Joint School District#283
- Moscow School District#281
- Potlatch School District#285
- Troy School District #287
- Whitepine Joint School District#288

== Lemhi County ==
- Salmon School District#291
- South Lemhi School District#292

== Lewis County ==
- Highland Joint School District#305
- Kamiah Joint School District#304
- Nezperce Joint School District#302

== Lincoln County ==
- Dietrich School District#314
- Richfield School District#316
- Shoshone Joint School District#312

== Madison County ==
- Madison School District #321
- Sugar-Salem Joint School District#322

== Minidoka County ==
- Minidoka County Joint School District#331

== Nez Perce County ==
- Culdesac Joint School District#342
- Lapwai School District#341
- Lewiston Independent School District#1

== Owyhee County ==
- Bruneau-Grand View Joint School District #365
- Homedale Joint School District#370
- Marsing Joint School District#363
- Pleasant Valley School District #364

== Payette County ==
- Fruitland School District#373
- New Plymouth School District#372
- Payette Joint School District#371

== Power County ==
- American Falls Joint School District #381
- Arbon Elementary School District #383
- Rockland School District#382

== Shoshone County ==
- Avery School District #394
- Kellogg Joint School District#391
- Mullan School District#392
- Wallace School District#393

== Twin Falls County ==
- Buhl Joint School District #412
- Castleford School District#417
- Filer School District#413
- Hansen School District#415
- Kimberly School District#414
- Murtaugh Joint School District#418
- Three Creek Joint Elementary School District#416
- Twin Falls School District#411

== Valley County ==
- Cascade School District #422
- McCall-Donnelly Joint School District#421

== Washington County ==
- Cambridge Joint School District#432
- Midvale School District#433
- Weiser School District#431

== Single-District Counties ==
- Bear Lake County School District #33
- Boundary County School District #101
- Butte County Joint School District #111
- Camas County School District#121
- Clark County School District #161
- Orofino Joint School District#171 (Clearwater County)
- Emmett Independent School District#221 (Gem County)
- Oneida County School District#351
- Teton County School District#401
