= Jerome High School (Jerome, Idaho) =

Coordinates: 42.725°N 114.500°W

Location
- 104 North Tiger Dr. Jerome, Idaho 83338; United States

Information
- School type: Public, high school
- School district: Jerome School District (#261)
- Principal: Nathan Tracey
- Teaching staff: 61.76 (FTE)
- Grades: 9–12
- Gender: Co-educational
- Enrollment: 1,156 (2023–2024)
- Student to teacher ratio: 18.72
- Colors: Black and orange
- Athletics: IHSAA Class 4A
- Athletics conference: Great Basin (West)
- Mascot: Tiger
- Yearbook: Tiger
- Feeder schools: Jerome Middle School
- Website: www.jeromeschools.org/jhs

Jerome High School is a four-year public high school located in Jerome, Idaho, the only traditional high school operated by the Jerome Joint School District #261. The school colors are black and orange and the mascot is a tiger.

== Athletics ==
Jerome competes in athletics in IHSAA Class 5A in the Great Basin (West) Conference with Burley, Minico and Wood River, all located in the Magic Valley region of Idaho. Twin Falls and the new Canyon Ridge, both located in Twin Falls, joined the conference in August 2009.

Jerome Tigers sports teams, particularly the boys' football team, are locally referred to as "J-Town." In the fall of 2008, the "J-Town" football team made it to the state finals for the first time in over 20 years, but lost to the Hillcrest Knights.

=== State titles ===
Boys

- Football (1): fall (A-2, now 3A) 1985, 1986 (official with introduction of A-2 playoffs, fall 1978)
  - (unofficial poll titles - 0) (poll introduced in 1963, through 1977)
- Cross Country (13): fall (B, now 3A) 1969, 1970, 1973, 1974, 1975, 1976, 1977, 1978, 1979, 1980, 1981, 1982, 1986 (introduced in 1964)
- Soccer (1): fall(introduced in 2000)
- Basketball (1): (A-2, now 3A) 1987
- Wrestling (1): (A, now 5A) 1975 (introduced in 1958)
- Track (17): (A-2, now 3A) 1973, 1974, 1977, 1979, 1980, 1982, 1983, 1984, 1986, 1988, 1989, 1993, 1994, 1995, 1996, 1997, 1998
- Golf (5):(B, now 3A) 1988, 1989, 1995 (introduced in 1956)
- Tennis: (see below, combined team until 2008)

Girls

- Cross Country (10): fall (B, now 3A) 1976, 1977, 1979, 1980, 1981, 1986, 1987, 1988, 1989, 1990 (introduced in 1974)
- Basketball (1): (4A) 2004 (introduced in 1976)
- Track (10): (A-2, now 3A) 1977, 1978, 1979, 1982, 1991, 1998; (A-1, now 5A) 1999; (A-1 Div II, now 4A) 2001; (4A) 2002, 2011 (introduced in 1971)

Combined

- Tennis (6): (B, now 3A) 1970(t), 1985, 1989, 1990, 1992, 1997 (introduced in 1963, combined until 2008)

== Band ==
The JHS Band has been, officially, nicknamed the "Ambush of Tigers Marching Unit/Force". The Ambush has been ranked in the top ten in Idaho for the past four years. The director of the Band is Mr. Hiroshi Fukuoka. The band currently consists of 20 to 25 members. In 2009–2010, the Ambush became the District 4 State Champions, beating the Burley High School "Burley Bobcat Band", in two out of three of their competitions, for the award, the first time that the "Ambush of Tigers" have ever won the award. The Pep Band has helped the school win the Sportsmanship Award three consecutive years, until the Band and school were beaten out for the award this year, amid controversy, to rival Twin Falls High School Bruins in the IHSAA Girls State Championship Tournament. The Band also lost the Sportsmanship award in the IHSAA Boys State Championship Tournament.
