= Buhl High School =

Coordinates: 42.60787°N 114.75661°W

- 525 Sawtooth; Buhl, Idaho; United States

Information
- Type: Public
- Motto: Tribe Pride
- Principal: Shari Moulton
- Teaching staff: 20.50 (FTE)
- Grades: 9-12
- Enrollment: 365 (2023-2024)
- Student to teacher ratio: 17.80
- Colors: Orange and black
- Mascot: Indian
- IHSAA Division: 3A
- Website: www.buhlschools.org/bhs

Buhl High School is a high school in Buhl, Idaho. Buhl High School is part of the Twin Falls School District. Buhl High School's mascot is an Indian. The colors are orange and black.
