= Burley High School =

Coordinates: 42.527°N 113.804°W

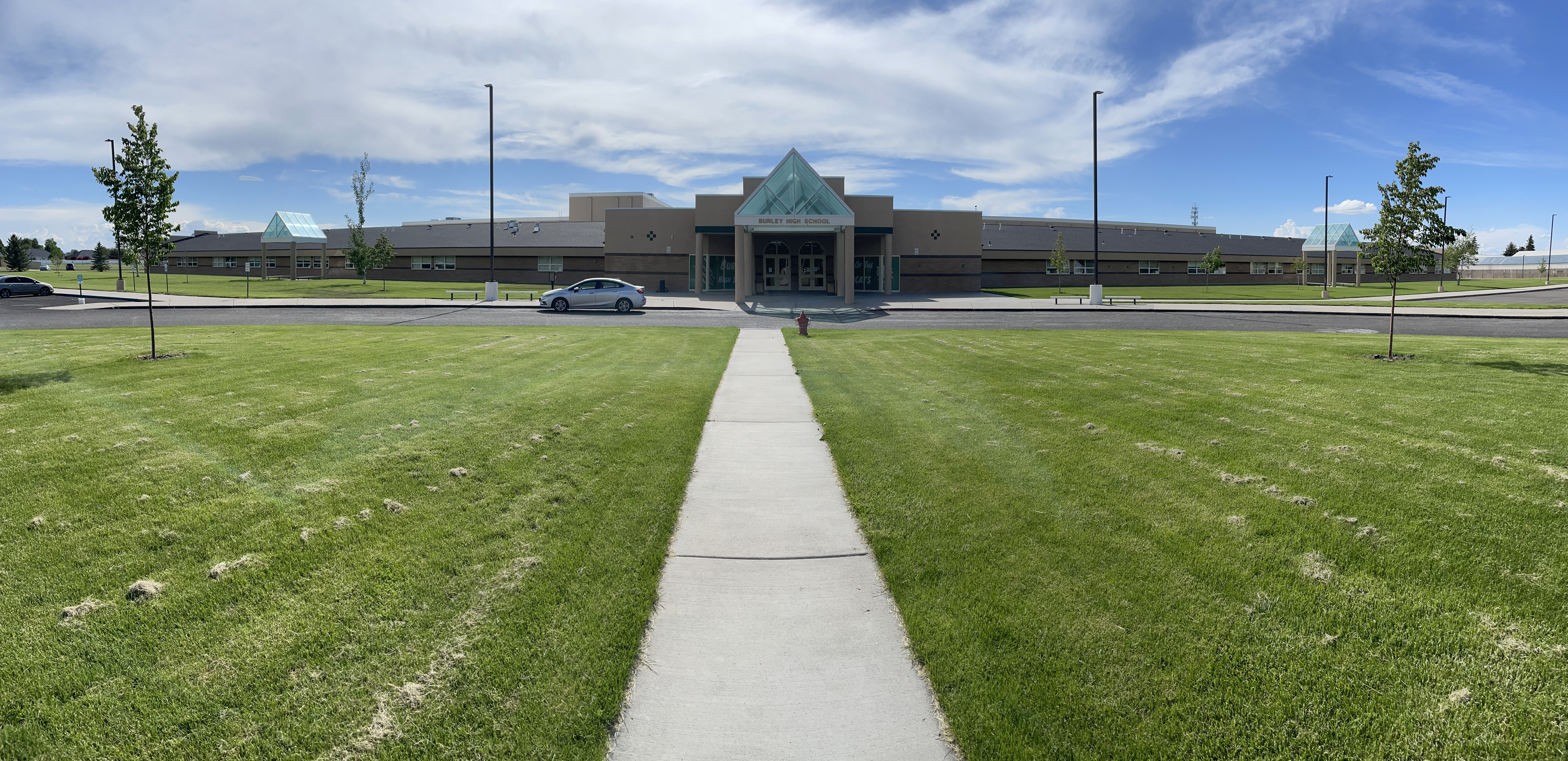
- 2100 Parke Ave. Burley, Idaho; United States

Information
- Type: Public
- School district: Cassia County S.D. (#151)
- Principal: Levi Power
- Teaching staff: 53.88 (FTE)
- Grades: 9–12
- Enrollment: 1,024 (2023-2024)
- Student to teacher ratio: 19.01
- Colors: Green, white, and gray
- Athletics: IHSAA Class 4A
- Athletics conference: Great Basin (West)
- Mascot: Bobcat
- Rivals: Minico, Jerome
- Yearbook: Bobcat
- Elevation: 4,170 ft (1,270 m) AMSL
- Website: www.cassiaschools.org/o/bhs

Burley High School is a four-year secondary school in Burley, Idaho, the largest of four traditional high schools in the Cassia County School District #151. Its official title is Burley Senior High School.

== Facilities ==
The King Fine Arts Center, located at the southern end of the school and functioning semi-independently from it, is a performing arts center with seating for 1,200 attendees, which regularly hosts plays, concerts, and community events.

The school also includes Skagg's Field, a sports complex built in 2008.

The school's current address is 2100 Parke Avenue.

== History ==
The previous school was built in the 1950s, residing at the locally known address of #1 Bobcat Boulevard, and the building still exists as a satellite campus for the College of Southern Idaho. The school's current facility has been in use since Spring semester 1999. Until the 2006–07 school year, BHS was exclusively a three-year senior high school, with the freshman class attending Burley Junior High School.

In 2018, Burley's assistant principal, Andrew Wray, was named Assistant Principal of the Year by the Idaho Association of School Administrators.

BHS's graduating class of 2023 had 240 graduates, hosting one of its largest graduations ever. Two-thirds of the graduating class intends to pursue higher education: 56% at a university or state college, and 10% through a trade school.

== Athletics ==
Burley competes in athletics in IHSAA Class 4A the second-highest classification, and is a member of the Great Basin (West) Conference with Minico (near Rupert), Jerome, and Wood River (Hailey), Twin Falls and Canyon Ridge (Twin Falls).

In the 2022–23 school year, Burley's football team ended a 13-year postseason drought and recorded their second winning season in 18 years. Gatlin Bair, a 4-star wide receiver and Idaho’s top-rated college prospect for the 2024 recruiting class, was a senior at Burley High. Bair also holds the Idaho high school state records for the 100- and 200-meter dashes, and won the 2023 Idaho Gatorade Boys Track & Field Player of the Year award.

=== State titles ===
Boys

- Basketball (6): 1935, 1941, (A-1, now 5A) 1991, (A-2, now 4A) 1992; (4A) 2007, 2008
- Track (2): 1921, 1922 (one class)

Girls

- Basketball (3): (4A) 2007, 2018, 2022.
