= Pleasant Valley School District =

Pleasant Valley School District may refer to:

- Pleasant Valley School District (California)
- Pleasant Valley School District (Idaho)
- Pleasant Valley School District (Pennsylvania)
