= Community School (Sun Valley, Idaho) =

Coordinates: 43°41′21″N 114°21′12″W

Sun Valley Community School
- One Community School Drive; Sun Valley, Idaho; U.S.

Information
- Type: Private
- Motto: From here... anywhere
- Established: 1973
- Principal: Ben Pettit
- Faculty: 75
- Grades: Pre-k through twelve
- Enrollment: 399
- Colors: Navy & White
- Athletics: IHSAA Class 2A
- Mascot: The cutthroat trout
- Information: (208) 622-3955
- Elevation: 5,880 ft (1,790 m) AMSL
- Website: communityschool.org

Sun Valley Community School (formerly known as Community School) is a private school in the western United States, located in Sun Valley, Idaho. It was established in 1973 as a secondary school and moved to its present location in 1975. The school now provides pre-kindergarten through twelfth grade programs, in addition to an Outdoor Program, Outdoor Leadership Academy, Sun Valley Ski Academy, and Residential Program. Its main Trail Creek Campus is located just south of the Sun Valley Resort alongside Trail Creek, at the northwest base of Dollar Mountain. Its residential Campus, Rufus M. Brown Hall is located at 280 Northwood Way, Ketchum, and its athletic facility, Dumke Family Sagewillow Campus, is located at 1 Arrowleaf Road, Sun Valley.

Parked among five mountain ranges in the heart of the Wood River Valley, Sun Valley Community School is a small, independent pre-k through twelfth grade college preparatory school.

The school's mascot is a blue cutthroat, a native fish in the area.

== Athletics ==
Sun Valley Community School athletic teams compete in IHSAA Class 2A. The school colors are navy blue and white and its mascot is a cutthroat trout. The school fields teams in soccer, cross-country, track, basketball, golf, tennis, and volleyball (girls). The tennis and soccer teams compete in class 3A; the Cutthroats have won eight state championships in tennis through 2012 and six soccer state championships, the most recent in 2022.

Students wishing to participate in sports not provided, (football, baseball, swimming) may compete at the public high school, Wood River in Hailey, a Class 4A school in the Great Basin (West) Conference.

=== State titles ===
Boys

- Tennis (3): (3A) 2009, 2010, 2012, 2019
- Soccer (5): 1978, 1986, 1992, 1999, 2018

Girls

- Soccer (1): 2022

Combined

- Tennis (5): (3A) 2001, 2002, 2004, 2005, 2006 (combined team until 2008)

== Sun Valley Ski Academy ==
The Sun Valley Ski Academy was introduced in 2011 to provide competitive skiers and snowboarders with world-class training and coaching from the Sun Valley Ski Education Foundation combined with an excellent college preparatory education at Sun Valley Community School. Former World Cup racer and two-time Olympian Jonna Mendes is the Program Director and renowned mountaineer Ed Viesturs, a local resident, is an advisor. For its eighth academic year, the program's enrollment is flourishing with more than 80 snowsport athletes. The majority compete in alpine racing, with numerous athletes also competing in cross-country, freestyle, freeskiing, and snowboard. The athletes have the option to board through the schools Residential Program.

== Residential Program ==
Sun Valley Community School’s Residential Program began in 2011 with eight students, who lived in what had been the Bald Mountain Inn. In January 2017 a new 25,000 square foot dormitory, Rufus M. Brown Hall, opened its doors. Rufus M Brown Hall includes the 3,200 square foot Julia Argyros Training Center which, in the fall of 2017, was designated a "High Performance Center" by U.S. Ski and Snowboard.

Rufus M. Brown Hall has housed as many as 24 students, as well as Residential Advisors (RAs). Boarding students are fully integrated into the life of the school, and participate on teams, in clubs, and in theater performances.

== Outdoor Program and Outdoor Leadership Academy ==
Sun Valley Community School's Outdoor Program is a three or four-year program that develops the skills, experience, and certifications students need to lead outdoor trips, and fosters general leadership skills. Students complete core requirements in addition to one skill-based section in Mountain and Rock, River, Backcountry Winter Travel, or Wilderness Travel.
