= Canyon Ridge High School =

Public school in Twin Falls, Idaho, United States

Coordinates: 42.586°N 114.485°W

- 300 North College Rd. West; Twin Falls, Idaho; United States

Information
- Type: Public, four-year
- Motto: Soaring to Success
- Established: 2009
- School district: Twin Falls S.D. (#411)
- Principal: Randall Miskin
- Teaching staff: 70.75 (FTE)
- Grades: 9–12
- Enrollment: 1,437 (2023–2024)
- Student to teacher ratio: 20.36
- Campus: 55 acres (22 ha)
- Colors: Crimson & Silver
- Athletics: IHSAA Class 4A
- Athletics conference: Great Basin (West)
- Mascot: Riverhawk
- Rival: Twin Falls
- Elevation: 3,640 ft (1,110 m) AMSL
- Website: https://cr.tfsd.org/

Canyon Ridge High School is a public secondary school in Twin Falls, Idaho, operated by the Twin Falls School District. It is the second traditional high school in the district and opened in August 2009. The school colors are crimson and silver and the mascot is a Riverhawk.

As Twin Falls High School became increasingly overcrowded, funding for a second high school was approved by Twin Falls voters in March 2006. The school name and mascot were selected by the Twin Falls School Board in November 2006, and construction began in July 2007.

Canyon Ridge draws its students from the western half of the city and is located on North College Road in northwestern Twin Falls. It is about a mile (1.6 km) south of the Snake River Canyon and just northwest of the College of Southern Idaho.

== Athletics ==
Canyon Ridge competes in athletics in IHSAA Class 4A, the state's second-highest classification (four-year enrollment between 640 and 1,279). It is a member of the Great Basin (West) Conference with Burley, Jerome, Minico (Rupert), Twin Falls, and Wood River (Hailey), all located in south central Idaho's Magic Valley.

=== State Titles ===
Boys

- Cross Country (1): 2017

Girls

- Golf (1): 2017
