= Borah High School =

Coordinates: 43.597°N 116.258°W

- 6001 W. Cassia Street; Boise, Idaho; U.S.

Information
- Type: Public
- Motto: Here We Have Borah
- Established: 1958; 68 years ago
- School district: Boise School District#1
- Principal: Tim Standlee
- Faculty: 81.59 (FTE)
- Grades: 10–12
- Enrollment: 1,295 (2023-2024)
- Student to teacher ratio: 15.87
- Colors: Green & Gold
- Athletics: IHSAA Class 6A
- Athletics conference: Southern Idaho (6A) (SIC)
- Mascot: Lion
- Nickname: The Lions of Idaho
- Rivals: Boise, Capital, Timberline
- Newspaper: The Senator
- Yearbook: Safari
- Feeder schools: South Junior High; West Junior High
- Elevation: 2,720 ft (830 m) AMSL
- Website: borah.boiseschools.org

Borah High School is a three-year public secondary school located in Boise, Idaho. One of four traditional high schools in the Boise School District, it serves students in grades 10–12 in the southwest portion of the district and is named for William Borah (1865–1940), a prominent U.S. Senator from the state, a presidential candidate in 1936, and namesake of the state's highest mountain.

== History ==
The school opened 68 years ago in the fall of 1958 at the base of the second Boise bench, on what later became Cassia Street in southwest Boise. Borah was the second high school in the Boise School District, preceded by Boise High School in 1902, and followed by Capital in the north in 1965, and Timberline in the southeast (converted from Les Bois Junior High) in 1998.

In the last years before Borah opened, overcrowding at Boise High School limited its downtown campus to the upper two grades only. Sophomores remained with the freshman at the four junior high schools (North, East, South, & West). Unlike most new high schools, Borah had a senior class (1959) during its first year.

In 1968, there was an early morning vandalism and fire incident in mid-September, resulting in $50,000 damage. The fire was noticed and called in by a newspaper carrier.

Since 1988, there has been a cockroach infestation problem. While the school pays $2,000 to exterminate some of them every year, the insects have nested in the tunnels beneath the school and they are unable to completely get rid of the pests.

== Mascot and colors ==
The school colors of Borah High School are green and gold (with accessory use of white and black), and the mascot is the lion. The school's slogan is "The Lions of Idaho," a play on the nickname of namesake Senator William Borah, known internationally as the "Lion of Idaho," for his oratory style and often outspoken stance on issues.

== Student body ==
In July 2015 the school enrollment was 1,569; the 13th grade 10 students, 467 seniors, 553 juniors, and 508 sophomores and 31 freshmen; 52% of the school's graduating seniors enrolled in post-secondary education. The feeder schools into Borah are South Junior High and West Junior High.

Borah was listed in Newsweek's Top 1500 high schools in the United States in 2008. In the 1970s and 1980s, Borah had nearly 2,000 students, with over 600 students per class.

== Athletics ==
=== Football ===
Borah was the dominant football program in the state for the school's first quarter century, winning the Southern Idaho Conference and the A.P. writers' poll (introduced in 1963) in 15 of the first 21 seasons, as well as two of the first three official titles in the playoff system. Ed Troxel, a former head coach at the College of Idaho, was 76–8–2 (.895) in the school's first nine seasons, with eight unofficial state titles and a runner-up. After an undefeated season in 1966, he left to become an assistant at the University of Idaho in Moscow and assistant coach Delane "De" Pankratz succeeded him as head coach for the next two decades.

Pankratz' first five seasons as head coach brought five more state titles with only two defeats, to intra-city rival Capital in 1967 and 1971, separated by 34 consecutive victories. The 1971 team rebounded from the loss and won eight straight, with a final 27–12 victory on Thanksgiving over Punahou in Honolulu to finish 11–1. The Lions went undefeated in 1975, and in 1978, the last before the playoff system. Borah was the state runner-up in 1972, 1974, and 1976.

In November 1979, an eight-team playoff was introduced for the state's largest schools in Class A-1 (5A since 2001); Borah shut out Lewiston 42–0 in the semifinals and archrival Boise 38–0 in the final to grab the first official A-1 state title in football, and finished with a record of 11–1.

Both Borah and Boise returned to the finals in 1980, but with a different outcome as Boise won 7–0 with an early touchdown and a game-ending goal line stand. Borah finished at 9–3, with two losses to Boise and one to Capital. In November 1981, undefeated Borah regained the state title with a 30–13 win over Boise, in the Lions' closest game of the year (17 points). The Lions (12–0, with two shutouts) were unchallenged all season, winning by an average score of 37–9, earning a national top-20 ranking in multiple publications. Through 2022, it is Borah's most recent state title in football.

Additional state championships that academic year were won by the Borah varsity basketball team and track & field team (the second of four straight), for a rare triple state title for the class of 1982. The Borah baseball team won the state title in 1981, but lost their opener 1–0 at the state tourney in 1982.

Pankratz was the head football coach at Borah for twenty seasons (1967–86) and compiled a record of 186–36 (.838). He was succeeded by Wil Overgaard in May 1987, the head coach at nearby Bishop Kelly for three seasons and a graduate of rival Capital. He had been an assistant for six years under Pankratz at Borah (1978–83) and a three-year starter at tackle at Idaho (1974–76) under Troxel. Overgaard was the head coach for seven seasons (1987–93), then left for an administrative position in Weiser.

Darren Corpus, a Borah alumnus from the class of 1980, was hired as head coach in 2011. A longtime coach at feeder school West Junior High, he was the starting fullback on the 1978 and 1979 state champion teams and played college football at Boise State. In his first season, he led the Lions to their first winning season in a decade. The next year, the Lions went 7–2 in the regular season and tied for the 2012 SIC title. It was the most wins for the Lions since 1995 and their first state playoff berth since 2001.

=== Basketball ===
In 2020, the Lions successfully defended their state title in basketball, a state record thirteenth, both under coach Jeremy Dennis, previously an assistant to Cary Cada. At Borah, Cada won consecutive titles three times (1993, 1994, 2004, 2005, 2012, 2013). The Lions won back-to-back titles with different head coaches in the mid-1960s, and five under Kirk Williams in the 1980s and 1990s.

=== Track ===
The boys' track team has won four consecutive titles on three separate occasions, with different head coaches: 1960–63 (Ed Troxel), 1981–84 (Rich Dickson), and 2004–07 (Chester Grey). The girls' team also won four consecutive titles (2005–08) with Grey as head coach.

=== State titles ===
Boys

- Football (2): fall 1979, 1981 (official with introduction of playoffs, fall 1979)
  - (unofficial poll titles - 10) - fall 1963, 1965, 1966, 1967, 1968, 1969, 1970, 1971, 1975, 1978
  - (pre-poll conference titles - 5) - fall 1958, 1959(co), 1960, 1961, 1962 - (poll introduced in 1963)
- Cross Country (2): fall 1979, 2003 (introduced in 1964)
- Soccer (1): fall 2010 (introduced in 2000)
- Basketball (13): 1965, 1966, 1982, 1984, 1985, 1993, 1994, 2004, 2005, 2012, 2013, 2019, 2020
- Wrestling (2): 1959, 1961
- Baseball (3): 1976, 1981, 2005 (records not kept by IHSAA, state tourney introduced in 1971)
- Track (16): 1960, 1961, 1962, 1963, 1968, 1969, 1977, 1978, 1981, 1982, 1983, 1984, 2004, 2005, 2006, 2007
- Golf (7): 1961, 1965, 1966, 1967, 1977, 1978, 1980

Girls

- Cross Country (4): fall 1984, 1988, 1989, 2003 (introduced in 1974)
- Basketball (4): 1979, 1997, 1999, 2001 (introduced in 1976)
- Track (6): 1977, 1985, 2005, 2006, 2007, 2008 (introduced in 1971)

Combined

- Tennis (9): 1967, 1971, 1975, 1977, 1979, 1980, 1984, 1986, 1987 (introduced in 1963, combined until 2008)

== Facilities ==
The school sits on a sprawling campus, with five permanent buildings, connected by outdoor "breezeways." The original 1958 campus featured three structures: the main classroom building, with a designated hall for each of the three grade levels, and a cafeteria, library, main office and other assorted features. The other two buildings were the "math hall" (math and industrial arts); and the "old gym," which contained the school's original gymnasium, publications staff room, orchestra, band, and weight room facilities. The original flat roofs of the academic buildings were renovated with pitched roofs in the late 1980s.

A second gym was added to the campus 33 years ago in early 1993, commonly known as the "new gym," which was renovated in 2007–08. A large auditorium on the west end of the campus opened in 2000.

Athletic facilities include Wigle Field (former home to several minor league baseball teams, including the Boise Hawks), an indoor batting cage facility, synthetic-rubber track and several other fields used for physical education classes and extra-circular activities. Wigle (1929–2022) was the head baseball coach for Borah's first 24 years.

From its founding in 1958 through 2011, the school's varsity football team played its home games at Bronco Stadium on the campus of Boise State University, about four miles (6 km) east. In 2012, high school games were moved a few blocks northeast to the new Dona Larsen Park, the former site of East Junior High (1952–2009). Before it was a school site, it was "Public School Field," the home field of Boise High. It was also used for college football by Boise Junior College (1930s), and on occasion, the University of Idaho (1920s and 1930s).

Soccer games are held off-campus at 334 S. Cole Road, the old Jackson Elementary or BLA Building.

== Notable alumni ==
- Michael J. Squier, U.S. Army Brigadier General and Deputy Director of the Army National Guard, class of 1964
- Steve Preece, NFL defensive back (1969–77), Oregon State quarterback and broadcaster, class of 1965
- Lee Charles Kelley, dog trainer and mystery novelist, class of 1968
- Gene Bleymaier, longtime athletic director at Boise State, class of 1971
- Joel Horton, Idaho Supreme Court justice (2007–18), class of 1977
- Cedric Minter, CFL & NFL running back, high school principal, class of 1977
- Maggie Carey, filmmaker and actress, class of 1993
- Stephen Fife, MLB pitcher, class of 2005
- Caleb McSurdy, NFL linebacker, class of 2008
- Nathan Green, track and field athlete, class of 2021
