= Council High School (Idaho) =

Public school in Council, Idaho, US

Coordinates: 44°43′40″N 116°26′24″W

Location
- 101 East Bleeker Ave; Council, Idaho 83612; United States

Information
- Type: Public
- School district: District 13
- Principal: Murray Dalgleish
- Teaching staff: 10.13 (FTE)
- Grades: 7–12
- Enrollment: 117 (2024–2025)
- Student to teacher ratio: 11.55
- Colors: Red, White
- Athletics conference: Long Pin Conference
- Mascot: Lumberjacks
- Rival: Tri-Valley Titans
- Newspaper: The Lumberjack
- IHSAA Division: 1A
- Website: Council Lumberjacks

Council High School (CHS) is a junior and senior high school in Council, Idaho, United States. It is a part of Council School District.

== History ==
Sometime between 1900 and 1910, a new all-brick Council school was completed. High school was incorporated around 1908, with the first graduate in 1912. In 1922 the school met with state superintendent of public instruction Ethel Redfield and other officials to gain accreditation with the state. Prior to this time, the curriculum only covered three years of high school; in order to better qualify students for higher education, it was proposed that Council high add a fourth year of study.

The school has occupied several buildings over the years. Prior to 1941, they shared a building with the elementary school. In 1941 a facility was built for the high school only. In 1964 an addition to the high school was built. The cost was $30,000. In October of that year, the main building burned. The music and vocational building did not receive damage. The fire resulted in school materials in the building being rendered unusable. Prior to the opening of the new school, churches hosted classes for the high school. In March 1965 there was a proposal for a bond for $320,000 to fund a new building, but the voters did not approve that proposal.

It was replaced in 1966 by a new junior-senior high built at a cost of $320,000.

In 2005, the school converted from oil heating to biomass (wood burning) heating, with a Council District grant of $386,000 and a $1.2 million bond issue approved by voters. The conversion was "a project that's expected to save Council $1 million on fuel over the next 15 years".

== Athletics ==
Council played began playing football in 1922. A basketball team was formed in 1923, playing in a court on the second floor of Legion Hall.

In 1941 Council won the Idaho State Championship in six man football. In 2022 the girls basketball team was the runner up for the 1A division II state title. In 2023 the team won the state.
