= Boise High School =

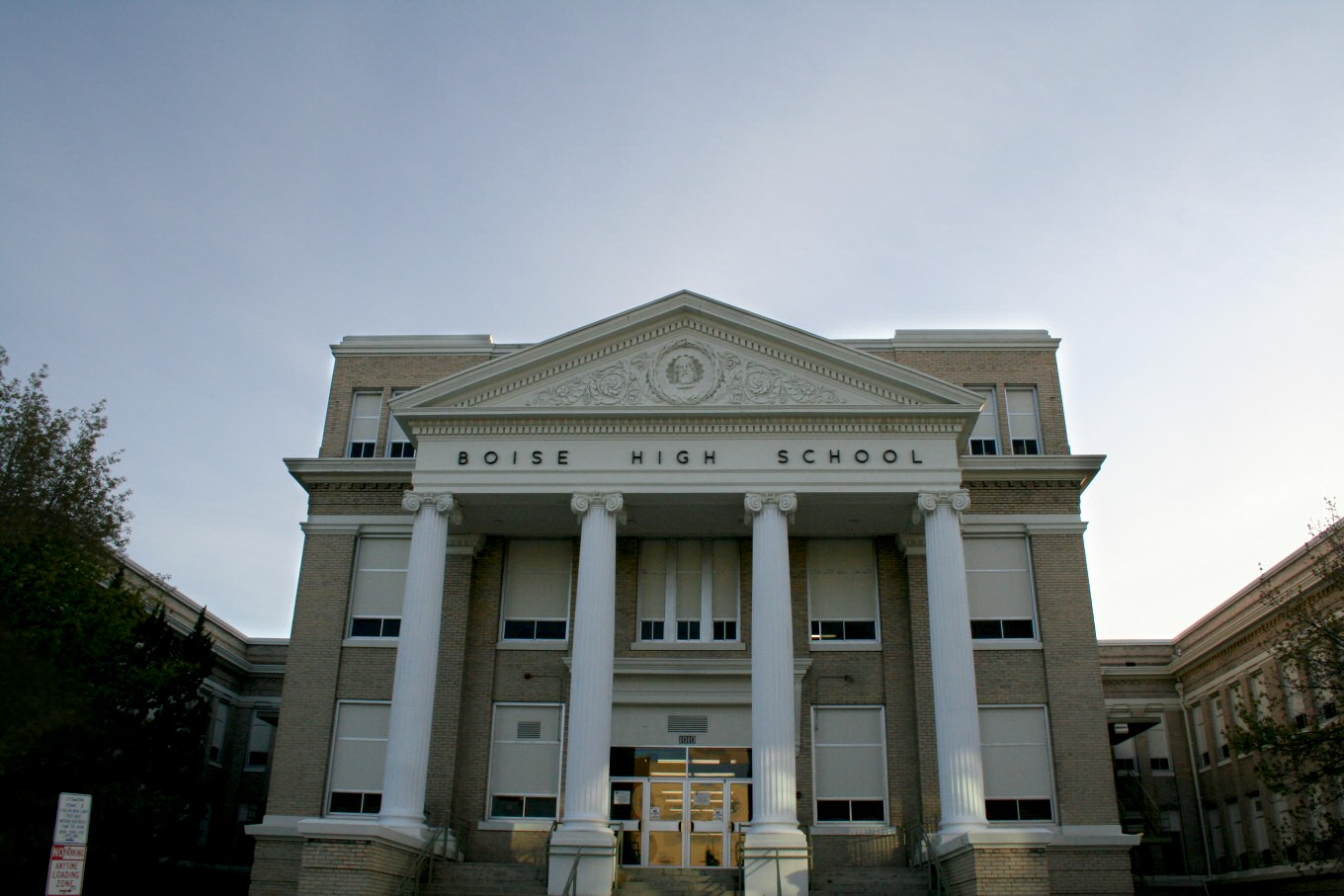
- Main entrance in May 2007

Location
- 1010 W. Washington St. Boise, Idaho 83702; United States

Information
- Type: Public
- Established: 1881
- School district: Boise School District#1
- Principal: Deborah Watts
- Faculty: 101
- Grades: 10–12
- Enrollment: 1,538 (2023-24)
- Colors: Red and White
- Athletics: IHSAA Class 6A
- Athletics conference: Southern Idaho (6A) (SIC)
- Nickname: Brave
- Rivals: Borah, Capital, Timberline
- Newspaper: Boise High Lights
- Yearbook: Courier
- Feeder schools: North Junior High; Hillside Junior High
- Website: Boise High School
- Boise High School Campus
- U.S. National Register of Historic Places
- U.S. Historic district – Contributing property
- Location within the United States Location within Idaho
- Location: Washington St. between 9th and 11th Sts., Boise, Idaho
- Coordinates: 43°37′15″N 116°12′3″W
- Area: 6 acres (2.4 ha)
- Built: 1908; 118 years ago (current main building)
- Architect: John E. Tourtellotte & Co.; Tourtellotte & Hummel
- Architectural style: Classical Revival, Modern Movement, Neo-Classical-Art Deco
- Part of: Fort Street Historic District (ID82000199)
- MPS: Tourtellotte and Hummel Architecture TR
- NRHP reference No.: 82000180
- Added to NRHP: November 17, 1982; 43 years ago

Boise High School is a public secondary school in Boise, Idaho, one of five traditional high schools within the city limits, four of which are in the Boise School District. A three-year comprehensive high school, Boise High is located on the outlying edge of the city's downtown business core. The enrollment for the 2014–15 school year was approximately 1,538.

The Boise High boundary includes all of Hidden Springs, downtown Boise, the North End, northeast end, and portions of Garden City.

== History ==
=== 1882 to 1930 ===
Before Boise High School, the Treasure Valley was serviced by Central High School. Opened in 1882, it cost $44,000 instead of the originally estimated sum of $25,000. Because of the cost and the fact that it was considered an overly large structure, the Central High School Board was criticized. Ironically, only a decade later 700 children overcrowded the school. Central High School was the only high school in the Idaho Territory. The high school students were placed in the top floor, while the primary, intermediate, and grammar pupils studied in the basement and the next two floors. The first graduating class of 1884 was composed of two students – Tom G. Hailey and Henry Johnson. The next year two female students and two male students graduated. In 1900, the number had expanded to 23 graduates.

The new high school which replaced Central School was dubbed "Boise High School." It was not the well-known white brick building present today. It was a traditional red brick, typical of the time period. The cornerstone was laid in 1902. A pageant with 1,200 students, as many adults, and three volleys from the cadet corps marked the joyous ceremony. Mayor Moses Alexander stated Boise High School was "where the rich and the poor meet on terms of equality" (qtd. in Worbois 4).

The Red Brick building, however, was terribly constructed. It was not built by local architects. Instead, the school was built by a contractor from Kansas, William F. Schrage. Idaho architects Tourtellotte & Hummel (later designers of the Idaho state capitol), along with Idaho architects Campbell & Wayland challenged Schrage and tried to raise a committee to prevent his plans. However, the committee approved Schrage's blueprints for the school. Anthony Miranda, author of the Boise High School Archive Project, states that C.B. Little, later the Superintendent of Buildings and grounds, complained, "...the class rooms were not properly lighted..." and "...they used acme plaster for the basement floors instead of Portland cement. The basement floor went to pieces" (qtd. in Worbois 5). Miranda also records that a survey of schools taken in 1919 remarked about Boise High School's ventilation: "At the high school one of the intakes is located in a hidden nook just above the level of the ground on the flat roof of the furnace room, a space which serves as a general catch-all for blowing dirt, trash, etc." (qtd. in Worbois 5, 6).

Not only was the building poorly constructed, but it soon became too small. The number of high school students expanded from 200 to 300 pupils within only 5 years after its construction. Tourtellotte and Hummel were chosen to build a new structure. Their grandiose blueprints included a capacity of 1,200 students. Even though red brick was popular for schools during the time period, Tourtellotte and Hummel decided to use white brick instead. Superintendent Meek, a progressive, and the School Board, also progressive, in 1908 stated their belief "in making the system and building so pleasing and inviting that children will desire to go to school and enter into their work and study with enthusiasm and delight" (qtd. in Worbois 7).

The Boise High building that stands today was constructed in three phases. The east wing was constructed in 1908. It housed classes for male students. The Idaho Statesman reported: "In one wing was to be located the manual training, agriculture and work of that character which is generally taken up by boys and in the opposite wing was to be located the domestic science and those portions of manual training that usually are taken up by girls. In addition to the above there are the regular study rooms and class rooms, laboratories, etc., connected the same" (qtd. in Worbois 8). The curriculum between 1904 and 1908, saw the addition of manual training for boys, and sewing, music and cooking for girls. The domestic science courses at the high school can be credited to Marguerite Nolan, wife of former Boise Mayor Herbert Lemp. During the years 1908–1915, the manual arts and home economics programs grew while stenography and typewriting programs were added. Another amenity offered was the first free night school for students who dropped out of high school. In the basement below the newly constructed wing was an underground gymnasium, where students played various sports such as basketball and even baseball. One of its purposes was to keep boys in school. The School Board believed that if boys were able to play sports, they were more likely to attend class. Despite the emphasis on boys' access to physical activity, Boise High's first girls basketball team, consisting of 7 members, was formed in 1907, even before the construction of the gymnasium.

The first Idaho radio station was broadcast from the east wing's basement. Extra power was wired, a tower was added on the roof, and W7YA trained broadcasters. KFAU, the new set of call letters assigned to the station in 1923, was housed in the physics department in the basement. The station was changed to KIDO Radio in 1928 when Boise High sold it to investors.

The east wing also has a long history of ROTC Cadets. Englishman J.W. Daniels, the first district superintendent, ran Boise schools with military discipline. "Not only did students often find themselves drilling daily, but on Saturdays, the teachers were also put through a similar course of instruction" (qtd. in Worbois 20). Under J.W. Daniels, Central School's military training began in 1900. Because the high school Cadets were denied federal funding for ROTC, they purchased their own uniforms and some equipment and convinced the NCO at the local barracks to train them. When the Red Brick Building was constructed, the Cadets had expanded from around 30–40 to 70 students. They disbanded during World War I, but in 1918 Boise High ROTC reorganized. In 1919, when Congress included funding for high school ROTC, the Boise High School Cadet Corps was officially established with a total of 60 boys under Lt. Col. John E. Wall. Cadets practiced with mere 22 caliber rifles. They used the east wing basement until the 1970s. To this day there are bullet holes in the basement because of the rifle range. These rooms were actually still used as classrooms and the Boise High School library until the 1990s tech building was constructed.

The west wing was added in 1912. With a domestic science division and a spacious cafeteria, this section was designed for Boise High School girls. Most schools at that time did not offer lunch. However, Boise High School served low cost lunches as a way to keep pupils in school. Food used in domestic science classes was served for lunch, which offset the costs of supplying food for cooking instruction. Well-planned (for the time period) ventilation and heating systems were installed so students could concentrate better. Large boilers heated the huge school. They produced dangerous high-pressure steam, so the heating plant was placed in a reinforced basement chamber between the Red Brick Building and the west wing, so it was separate from other structures. The smoke was said to be "entirely and absolutely consumed by the fire, which is a wise precaution...as the building now being constructed is in the residential section of the city and hence will not now become a nuisance to adjoining property owners" (qtd. in Worbois 11, 12), since the boilers were supplied by blower equipped hoppers which fed the fuel to the fire.

The Red Brick building was quickly degenerating. The School Board wanted to demolish it and replace it with a new central wing, but when space became scarce by the late 1910s, they decided to postpone the plan. Modern technology dictated more and different spaces for boys' classes. Rather than learn how to blacksmith, boys needed to learn how to fix automobiles. Printing, woodworking, and construction now used different techniques which required larger classrooms.

The School Board agreed to build a separate building across 10th Street from the east wing. They initially called it the Manual Arts Building, but it opened in 1919 as the Industrial Arts Building, or the I.A. An Idaho Statesman article from 1921 boasted, "When finished, Boise will have one of the largest as well as the most completely equipped secondary schools in the northwest. Already the Industrial Arts building has made possible the addition of many vocational courses, ranging from printing to costume design, not usually found in the average high school" (qtd. in Worbois 13). For nearly half a century, most of the district's printing was completed at the Industrial Arts Building. The school's monthly magazine, The Boise High Courier, was published in 1900, and later became the school's yearbook. The school newspaper The Pepperbox was also a Boise High School publication during the early 20th century. Today, the Boise High School Newspaper is called Boise Highlights.

The Red Brick building was demolished during the summer of 1921. Small parts of the red brick were left, to be handled later during remodeling. The central wing replaced the dilapidated structure. According to Dean M. Worbois, author of Temple of Liberty: Boise High School Defines a Frontier Town, "The central wing of the new white brick building completed the architect's concept of a grand, classical environment dedicated to learning. A massive stairway invites entry...A bust of Plato is surrounded, in Greek, with his Civic Virtues: Wisdom, Courage, Justice and Moderation."

The auditorium was constructed to seat 1,800 students. Because it was so distant from the stage, the third balcony was dubbed "the nose bleed section," and was relegated to the sophomores. Juniors used the first and second balconies, while seniors called the main floor. The auditorium was not just for school functions, but was an asset to the community as well. It has been used by local orchestras, Boise's Music Week, and traveling stars, until the construction of Boise State University's Morrison Center in 1984. The auditorium has been named the "Boise Opera House." It has even showcased well-known musicians Duke Ellington and Bing Crosby.

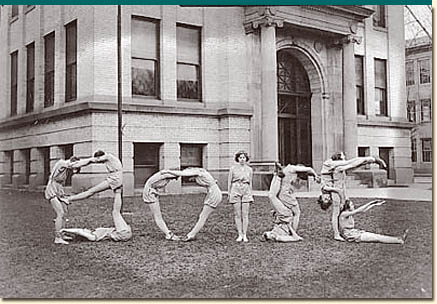
"Tumblers" from 1933 edition of The Courier

Historic Boise School District Curriculum; 1903–1904
9th	10th	11th	12th
Algebra	Algebra	English literature	Chemistry
American literature	Rhetoric	Physics	Geology
Civics	History	Plane Geometry	Solid geometry
Physical geography	Zoology	Astronomy	American History
English grammar or Latin	Botany or Caesar	English History or Cicero	Economics
			Advanced Arithmetic
			Critical Literature or Virgil

=== 1930 to 1990 ===
The 1930s and 1940s were difficult with the Great Depression placing economic strain on the country. Curriculum expanding stopped for an emphasis on maintaining programs and classes. During World War II, district students worked in civil defense activities, assisted the Red Cross and helped with war bond drives.

1936 brought a new gymnasium. During the 1920s, students had gathered together their own money to help fund the construction costs. The Works Progress Administration, initiated by Franklin D. Roosevelt, provided the labor.[9] Total costs came to $6,969,420, with the materials paid for by the money raised by students, as well as district funds. Still standing today, this gymnasium replaced a small gym located in the basement of the east wing of the main building. Students welcomed the new facility, and the much higher ceilings no longer interfered with games.

In the mid-1950s, the school was one center of the Boise homosexuality scandal.

The 1950s and 1960s, however, brought renewed growth to Boise High. In 1957 an addition was made to the gym: a music building on the west side of the structure. The two residential blocks west of the main building were bought in 1960 and converted into a football, tennis and track field. This acquiring of land would later help preservationists and community leaders argue to keep the school at its location. It would also provide much needed room for the population boom of the future and provide space for basics like vehicle parking.

During these two decades, Boise began to see excessive growth in its high school class sizes. For several years in the mid to late 1950s, the four junior high schools included the tenth grade (sophomores). To alleviate the booming student body, two new senior high schools were built in the city: Borah in the southwest opened in 1958 and Capital in the north in 1965.

Beginning in 1969, some major remodeling went down. The formerly state-of-the-art heating systems were becoming outdated and needed replacement. Coal boilers became gas-powered. False, 8 foot ceilings were added to classrooms to hide the pipes and reduce heating costs. Wood paneling was added for a modern look. Rather than to change the windows to double or triple paned windows, insulated panels were added to reduce heating costs. Fluorescent lights were added as the primary source of light due to their efficiency in place of natural light.

=== 1990 to present ===
Former Braves logo

During the late 1980s and early 1990s the enrollment crunch began to reappear despite the new schools. This began forcing some classes at Boise High to close, and also pushed the school to occupy a nearby office building for extra classrooms (called the PERSI Building), and to bring in a number of portable classrooms that were placed in a faculty parking lot adjacent to the school's track and field. The PERSI Building housed all art classes and some language classes during this period.

The district began to study the possibility of a replacement school and the debate would continue for years. With this idea came a lot of public concern from neighborhood owners fearful of losing their historic neighborhood, preservationists, students and parents. Research shows that "community anchors" such as Boise High School, if removed, can have detrimental impacts on students and communities. Forcing students to travel farther away would influence local property owners and families that purchase lowering property values in place of suburban development.

In addition to overcrowded classrooms, the building itself needed serious repairs. Emergency exits were fewer than required by local safety code. Although later found unsubstantiated, at the time it was believed ceiling cracks and falling plaster in the auditorium may have been an asbestos hazard. Electrical wiring was outdated and the building had no air conditioning.

Because of the increasing pressure to keep Boise High School where it was, a bond measure was proposed in 1993 to pay for the complete renovation of the school. Taxpayers defeated it. Two years later, while bundled with provisions to repair many existing schools, to convert one school to a new high school (Timberline), and to build two new junior high schools, the bond passed with 70%.

Razing three structures and vacating a city street started the project. Americans with Disabilities Act accessibility improvements were made. An art gallery was created and a complete auditorium restoration was done. The third floor was closed off and air conditioning was installed building wide. Many other improvements were made. The Frank Church Building of Technology, named after the senator, a 1942 Boise High graduate, was also completed. The main building still houses the humanities classes whereas this new building houses science, computer and math courses.

Over the summer of 2007, the third floor was renovated with the addition of 5 new classrooms and became available for the 2008–2009 school year.

==== Mascot and logo change ====
In August 2019, after years of internal debate on the campus, the Boise School District Board of Trustees accepted a proposal and plan to change the high school mascot by dropping the "s," from "Braves" to simply "Brave." The change came after the Shoshone-Bannock Tribe wrote the Idaho Legislature, asking it to ban all Native American mascots from state schools. The school stopped using its Native American mascot costume during sporting and other events during the 2015–2016 school year. A new logo for Boise High was introduced in September 2019.

The new logo includes a shield centered around the letter “B” with a Greek column along its spine, representing strength and support with a nod to the school's architecture. Surrounding the letter are four Greek words carved above the entrance to Boise High, which translate to wisdom, justice, temperance and courage. Olive laurels, which are historic symbols of victory from civics to academics to athletics, surround the entire logo.

== Academics ==
Newsweek has ranked Boise High in every top national high school list created topping all other Idaho schools. Considered in the rankings were school Advanced Placement exam scores. In 2014, Boise High had 598 students who took 1,308 exams, and 86% of test-takers received a score of 3 or better. For the same year the school had 19 National Merit finalists.

2011–12 Grade Point Averages
Class	Enrollment	GPA
Senior	492	3.16
Junior	455	3.40
Sophomore	453	3.51

Newsweek National Rankings
Year	Boise Rank	Complete List
2003	679	806
2005	395	1025
2006	495	1215
2007	510	1328
2008	403	1401
2009	415	1499
2010	101–561	1787
* No 2004 ranking performed

== Athletics ==
In athletics, the Boise Brave compete in the Southern Idaho Conference (SIC) in Class 6A, the Idaho High School Activities Association's classification for the largest schools in the state. Sanctioned sports are volleyball, cross country, basketball, baseball, track and field, football, soccer, wrestling, softball, golf, and tennis. Also, cheerleading, speech, music, and dance are sanctioned activities.

For decades, varsity football games were played at Bronco Stadium at Boise State University. In 2012, football games for the city's high schools were moved several blocks northeast to the new Dona Larsen Park, the former site of East Junior High (1952–2009). Boise High played football at this site in the first half of the 20th century, when it was known as "Public School Field." The Brave's home venue for varsity baseball is at Fort Boise Park.

The 2008 Boise High baseball team was ranked 38th in the country by Baseball America and the National High School Baseball Coaches Association.

=== State titles ===
Boys

- Football (1): fall 1980 (official with introduction of playoffs, fall 1979)
  - (unofficial poll titles – 1) – fall 1964 (poll introduced in 1963, through 1978)
- Cross Country (3): fall 1964, 2005, 2009 (introduced in 1964)
- Soccer (7): fall 2007, 2008, 2011, 2013, 2016, 2020, 2024(introduced in 2000)
- Basketball (5): 1924, 1938, 1947, 1980, 1986
- Wrestling (4): 1958, 1960, 1963, 1964 (introduced in 1958)
- Baseball (6): 1991, 1994, 1996, 1997, 1998, 2008 (records not kept by IHSAA, state tourney introduced in 1971)
- Track (12): 1923, 1926, 1929, 1931, 1935, 1936, 1953, 1954, 1964, 1965, 1966, 1996
- Golf (7): 1958, 1985, 1988, 1989, 1991, 2022, 2024 (introduced in 1956)
- Tennis (7): 2008, 2010, 2011, 2012, 2015, 2016, 2017 (combined team until 2008)

Girls

- Cross Country (9): fall 1986, 1997, 1998, 2005, 2006, 2007, 2009, 2011, 2018 (introduced in 1974)
- Soccer (7): fall 2000, 2002, 2003, 2009, 2010, 2013, 2022 (introduced in 2000)
- Basketball (3): 1978, 2002, 2005 (introduced in 1976)
- Softball (1): 2018 (introduced in 1997)
- Track (6): 1998, 2015, 2021, 2022, 2023, 2024 (introduced in 1971)
- Golf (2): 1987, 1998 (introduced in 1987)
- Tennis (6): 2009, 2013, 2014, 2021, 2022, 2023 (combined team until 2008)

Combined

- Tennis (5): 1966, 1969, 2003, 2004, 2005 (introduced in 1963, combined until 2008)
- Ultimate Frisbee (3): 2011, 2012, 2013

== Activities ==
Three orchestras are organized within the school. A student's grade level usually places them into two of the three (sophomores in the Sophomore Orchestra, and juniors and seniors in the Symphonic Orchestra), while audition performance is used to form the third orchestra, the Chamber Orchestra. Boise High's Chamber Orchestra has received various national strings awards and won multiple competitions at the national level, frequently receiving invitations to attend international music festivals and to perform at the National Music Educators Conference.

Clubs are an important aspect of Boise High life. Boise High has over forty student organizations with focuses involving community service, politics, academic subjects, tutoring, and hobbies.

Boise High's National Ocean Sciences Bowl (NOSB) team achieved national success in the mid-2010s, winning both the 2014 NOSB national tournament held in Seattle and repeating as champions at the 2015 NOSB in Ocean Springs, Mississippi. Boise became the first team from a landlocked state (not including Great Lakes states) to win the ocean-themed competition.

== Campus ==
Nearly four and a half city blocks constitute school grounds in an L-shaped portion of property. The main building is contained within one block. The two blocks northwest house the football field and tennis courts. The Frank Church Building of Technology takes up nearly the entire block southeast of the main building. Southwest of the Frank Church Building of Technology is the gymnasium occupying half a block.

The neighborhood is mixed-use largely made up of residential and church buildings. Within two blocks are the First Church of Christ Scientist, originally established in 1898, the Capitol City Christian Church, built in 1887, the Cathedral of the Rockies, built in 1960, the First Baptist Church, St. John's Catholic Cathedral, built 1905–21, First Presbyterian Church, and St. Michael's Episcopal Cathedral, built in 1900. Also nearby is the Idaho State Capitol, a YMCA, and a former Carnegie library.

The school building was included as a contributing property in the Fort Street Historic District on November 12, 1982. It was individually listed on the National Register of Historic Places on November 17, 1982.

== Notable alumni ==
- Duane Beeson – decorated United States Air Force and Royal Canadian Air Force flying ace and prisoner of war
- Hamer Budge – U.S. Congressman (1951–61), chairman of SEC (1969–71)
- Roger Burdick – retired chief justice of the Idaho Supreme Court
- Linda Copple Trout – retired chief justice of the Idaho Supreme Court, first female justice
- Frank Church – four-term U.S. Senator (1957–81)
- William D. Eberle – U.S. trade ambassador (1971–74)
- C. Scott Green – president of the University of Idaho
- Ron Hadley – former NFL linebacker, San Francisco 49ers
- Howard W. Hunter – president of the Church of Jesus Christ of Latter-day Saints
- Larry Jackson – MLB pitcher; (Cardinals, Cubs, Phillies)
- Byron J. Johnson – justice of the Idaho Supreme Court
- Matteo Jorgenson – professional cyclist
- Wayne Kidwell – justice of the Idaho Supreme Court
- Mert Lawwill - 1969 National Champion motorcycle racer and mountain bike designer
- Doug Martsch – lead singer of Built to Spill
- Jim Messina – former White House deputy chief of staff
- Tammy Nichols – state senator
- Tony Park – state attorney general
- Elizabeth Prelogar – Miss Idaho and U.S. solicitor general
- Frank Shrontz – CEO of Boeing
- Wee Willie Smith – NFL back, New York Giants
- Carolyn Terteling-Payne – former mayor of Boise
- Ralph Torres – former governor of Northern Mariana Islands
- Judy Lynn Voiten – Miss Idaho and recording singer
- Wayne Walker – All-Pro NFL linebacker, Detroit Lions
- Emily Drabinski - academic
