= Boise School District =

School district in Idaho, United States

Coordinates: 43.5746°N 116.2835°W

Boise School District #1

Location
- 8169 W. Victory Rd. Boise, ID 83709 Boise, Idaho United States

District information
- Type: Public
- Motto: "Educating Today for a Better Tomorrow"
- Grades: PreK-12
- Established: 1865
- Superintendent: Lisa Roberts
- Budget: $391,030,908.00

Students and staff
- Students: 22,918 (22-23 school year)
- Teachers: 1,812 Certified Staff
- Staff: 3,054
- Athletic conference: Southern Idaho - 5A

Other information
- Website: www.boiseschools.org

The Boise School District #1 is one of 115 public school districts in Idaho, United States. The Boise School District serves a 456 square mile area of Ada County and is headquartered in Boise, Idaho. The district was founded in 1865 under the auspices of Idaho Territory. Formerly the largest school district in the state, it now ranks second to the adjacent West Ada School District#2, which administers several schools in western Boise. Peak enrollment in the Boise School District was reached in 1997 at 27,070.

The Boise School District #1 is the second-oldest school system in Idaho. The oldest is in Lewiston, founded three years earlier by the Washington Territory government.

Current-year tax rates for all Idaho school districts are available on the Idaho State Department of Education website.

== Service area ==
Within Ada County the district includes most of Boise, all of Hidden Springs, most of Garden City, and a small portion of Eagle. A portion of the district extends into Boise County.

== Schools ==
=== High schools ===
==== Traditional ====
Four senior high schools, grades 10–12, IHSAA class 5A, Southern Idaho Conference

- Boise High School - (1902, 1882 as Central School)
- Borah High School - (1958)
- Capital High School - (1965)
- Timberline High School - (1998)

The first Les Bois Junior High (1994), was remodeled and expanded in 1998 to become Timberline High School.

==== Alternative ====
- Frank Church - (2008), grades 9–12
- Marian Pritchett

=== Junior high schools ===
Eight junior high schools, grades 7–9, two per high school

- East Jr. High School- (1952, 2009)
- Fairmont Jr. High School - (1965)
- Hillside Jr. High School- (1960)
- Les Bois Jr. High School - (1994, 1998)
- North Jr. High School - (1937: "Boise" until South opened in 1948)
- Riverglen Jr. High School - (1998)
- South Jr. High School - (1948, 2008) {2009]
- West Jr. High School - (1952, 2008) [2009]

Prior to 1937, grades 7 and 8 were in the elementary schools.

=== Elementary schools ===
Thirty-two elementary schools, grades K–6.

- Adams
- Amity
- Collister
- Dallas Harris
- Cynthia Mann
- Garfield
- Grace Jordan
- Hawthorne
- Hidden Springs
- Highlands
- Hillcrest
- Horizon
- Jefferson
- Koelsch
- Liberty
- Longfellow
- Lowell
- Maple Grove
- Morley Nelson
- Monroe
- Mountain View
- Pierce Park
- Riverside
- Roosevelt
- Shadow Hills
- Trail Wind
- Valley View
- Washington
- White Pine
- Whitney
- Whittier
- William Howard Taft

=== Early Childhood ===
- Owyhee Early Childhood Learning Center

=== Joint School District Facilities ===
- Dennis Technical Education Center
- Treasure Valley Mathematics and Science Center
