= Ron Hadley =

American football player (born 1963)

No. 54
- Position: Linebacker

Personal information
- Born: November 9, 1963 (age 62); Caldwell, Idaho, U.S.
- Listed height: 6 ft 2 in (1.88 m)
- Listed weight: 240 lb (109 kg)

Career information
- High school: Boise (ID)
- College: Washington
- NFL draft: 1986: 5th round, 132nd overall pick

Career history
- New York Jets (1986)*; New York Giants (1987)*; San Francisco 49ers (1987–1988)
- * Offseason or practice squad member only

Awards and highlights
- Super Bowl champion (1988)

Career NFL statistics
- Fumble recoveries: 1
- Stats at Pro Football Reference

Ronald Arthur Hadley (born November 9, 1963) is an American former professional football player who was a linebacker with the San Francisco 49ers of the National Football League (NFL) in 1987 and 1988, when the 49ers won Super Bowl XXIII.

Hadley played college football for the Washington Huskies from 1982 to 1986, and was selected by the New York Jets in the fifth round of the 1986 NFL draft with the 132nd overall pick.

He is a 1982 graduate of Boise High School, where he was the IHSAA A-1 Player of the Year in his senior season. He was a starter on both defense and offense (defensive end and tight end), and led the Boise Braves to the A-1 state championship as a junior and the state finals as a senior.

== Post-NFL Career ==
Hadley is a Director of Quality with Boeing Commercial Airplanes in Everett, Wash.
