= Magic Valley High School =

School in Twin Falls, Idaho

Coordinates: 42°33′37″N 114°28′29″W

Location
- 512 Main St. Twin Falls, Magic Valley, Idaho; United States

Information
- Type: Alternative
- Principal: Jason Kiester
- Faculty: 15.00 (FTE)
- Grades: 9-12
- Enrollment: 153 (2023-2024)
- Student to teacher ratio: 10.20
- Colors: Purple and White
- Mascot: Ocelot
- Website: mv.tfsd.org

Magic Valley High School is an alternative high school in Twin Falls, Idaho. It is part of the Twin Falls School District.
