= Volara Romanza Nelson =

American aviator and automobile racer (1892–1921)

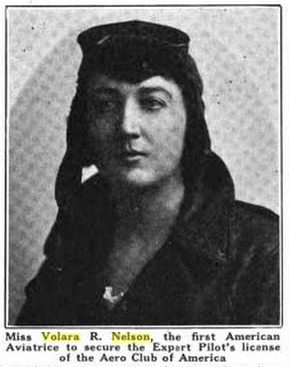
- Born: May 18, 1892; Twin Falls, Idaho, U.S.
- Died: July 2, 1921 (aged 29)

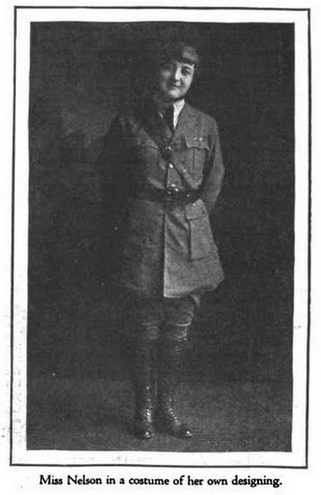
Volara Romanza Nelson in her flight clothes, from a 1921 publication.

Volara Romanza Nelson (May 18, 1892 – July 2, 1921) was an American aviator and automobile racer.

== Early life ==
Volara Romanza Mayes of Twin Falls, Idaho was the daughter of William Henry Mayes and Sara Elizabeth Ownby Mayes. Always interested in mechanics, she demonstrated automobiles when they were unfamiliar in much of the rural American west. In 1914 she "appeared with great success" at the War Bonnet Round-up, an automobile race in Idaho Falls. During World War I she worked in an aircraft factory, and learned the inner workings of airplanes.

== Aviation career ==
After the war, she was the first Idaho woman to hold a pilot's license, and the first woman to earn the "expert" pilot's license from the Aero Club of America. She earned her pilot's license and learned aerobatic flying at the Ralph C. Diggins flying school at Ashburn Flying Field near Chicago, Illinois, with further training at the Philadelphia Aero Service Corporation School.

Her flight certificate was #4662. "I will never forget my first flight alone," she recalled. "I made four short flights, making my landings and takeoffs in a manner which pleased me as well as my instructor, as I was his first and only woman student." She was an exhibition flyer, touring the United States performing stunts in her own plane.

== Personal life ==
In 1909 Volara Mayes married Frederick Adolf Nelson, who was also involved with automobiles. They lived in Boise, Idaho and had two sons. Volara Nelson died in the summer of 1921, aged 29 years, from head injuries sustained in an auto racing accident in North Platte, Nebraska.
