= Shoshone Bannock Jr./Sr. High School =

Coordinates: 43°00′54″N 112°26′15″W

Shoshone Bannock School
- Fort Hall, Idaho; United States

Information
- Type: public
- Established: 1996
- Oversight: Bureau of Indian Education
- Principal: Hank Edmo-McArthur
- Teaching staff: 4.00 (FTE)
- Grades: 6-12
- Enrollment: 130 (2023-2024)
- Student to teacher ratio: 32.50
- Colors: Black, red, white
- Mascot: Headdress
- IHSAA Division: 1A D2
- Website: http://www.sbd537.org/

Shoshone-Bannock Jr./Sr. High School, commonly known as Sho-Ban School is a high school in Fort Hall, Idaho. It serves the Fort Hall Indian Reservation. It is operated by Shoshone-Bannock School District #537, though it does not geographically include any area in Bannock County. The state of Idaho classifies it as a school district.

It is operated by a Native American tribe, under an agreement with the Bureau of Indian Education.

Its basketball team is known for going to the state tournament in their district and have made it 10 times in the last 12 years.

In 2009, player Magic Smith set 1A Division I tournament records for most free throws (18) and most field goals (43) in a tournament.

Circa 2021 the BIE is to directly operate the school so it can be directly funded by the BIE.

== See also ==
- List of school districts in Idaho
