= Gary Wimmer =

American football player (born 1961)

No. 48
- Position: Linebacker

Personal information
- Born: March 9, 1961 (age 65); Pocatello, Idaho
- Listed height: 6 ft 2 in (1.88 m)
- Listed weight: 225 lb (102 kg)

Career information
- High school: Capital (Boise, Idaho)
- College: Stanford
- NFL draft: 1983: undrafted

Career history
- Seattle Seahawks (1983)

Career NFL statistics
- Games played: 3
- Games started: 0
- Stats at Pro Football Reference

Gary Edwin Wimmer (born March 9, 1961) is an American former professional football player who was a linebacker in the National Football League (NFL) for one season. He played college football for the Stanford Cardinal.

== Professional career ==
Wimmer was selected by the Oakland Invaders as a territorial selection in the 1983 USFL draft, but did not play for the team.

Wimmer signed with the Seattle Seahawks as an undrafted free agent following the 1983 NFL draft. He played three games for the Seahawks in the 1983 season. He played primarily on special teams and did not record a statistic.
