= Wood River High School (Idaho) =

Location
- 950 Fox Acres Road; Hailey, Idaho; United States; 43.518°N 114.294°W

Information
- Type: Public
- School district: Blaine County S.D. (#61)
- Principal: Julia Grafft
- Teaching staff: 64.23 (FTE)
- Grades: 9–12
- Enrollment: 922 (2024-2025)
- Student to teacher ratio: 14.35
- Colors: Green & White
- Athletics: IHSAA Class 4A
- Athletics conference: Great Basin (West)
- Mascot: Wolverine
- Feeder schools: Wood River Middle School
- Elevation: 5,350 ft (1,630 m) AMSL
- Website: Wood River High School

Wood River High School is a public secondary school in Hailey, Idaho, one of two traditional high schools operated by the Blaine County School District #61 (the smaller Carey High School (K-12) is the other). Wood River High School serves the communities of Bellevue, Hailey, Ketchum, and Sun Valley, all in the valley of the Big Wood River. The current campus opened in August 2003. The school colors are green and white and the mascot is a wolverine.

East of central Hailey, the elevation of the WRHS campus is 5,350 feet (1,630 m) above sea level.

== Athletics ==
Wood River competes in athletics in IHSAA Class 4A, the state's second-highest classification. WRHS is a member of the Great Basin (West) Conference with Burley, Jerome, and Minico High Schools, all located in the Magic Valley region of south central Idaho. Twin Falls High School (formerly 5A) and the new Canyon Ridge High School, both located in Twin Falls, joined the conference in 2009. Formerly a member of the Sawtooth Central Idaho Conference (SCIC) in 3A, Wood River moved up to 4A in 2004. Mountain Home High School will join the Great Basin conference in for the 2016-18 arc.

=== State titles ===
Boys

- Cross Country (4): fall (B, now 3A) 1968, 1971, 1972; (4A) 2010 (introduced in 1964)
- Track (2): (A-2, now 3A) 1970, 1972
- Tennis (2): (4A) 2010, 2012 (combined team until 2008)
- Baseball: (3A) 2003
- Hockey (2A): 2007, 2020
- Soccer (4A): 2017

Girls

- Cross Country (3): fall (B, now 3A) 1975, 1983, 1984 (introduced in 1974)
- Soccer (1): fall (A-2, now 3A) 2000 (introduced in 2000)
- Volleyball (2): (A, now 5A) fall 1977, 1978 (introduced in 1976)

Combined

- Tennis (3): (B, now 3A) 1982, 1986, 1988 (introduced in 1963, combined until 2008)
- Debate 2014
