= Twin Falls High School =

Location
- 1615 Filer Avenue East; Twin Falls, Idaho 83301; United States; 42°34′19″N 114°27′11″W

Information
- Type: Public
- Established: 1907
- Principal: Ryan Nesmith
- Teaching staff: 64.33 (FTE)
- Grades: 9–12
- Enrollment: 1,381 (2024–2025)
- Student to teacher ratio: 21.47
- Colors: Columbia blue, navy blue, white
- Athletics: IHSAA Class 4A
- Athletics conference: Great Basin (West)
- Team name: Bruins
- Rival: Canyon Ridge
- Newspaper: The Bruin News
- Yearbook: Bruin
- Website: tf.tfsd.org

Twin Falls High School is a public secondary school in Twin Falls, Idaho, one of two traditional high schools operated by the Twin Falls School District #411.

== School history ==
Twin Falls High School was founded in 1907. Citizens passed a bond in 1909 to construct the high school building and a supplemental bond in 1911 to complete construction. Formal dedication of the original high school, located on Shoshone Street next to the Twin Falls County Courthouse, occurred in February 1912.

The current Twin Falls High School on Filer Avenue opened in September 1954. The original high school building became Twin Falls Junior High School (now O'Leary Middle School). The original building was condemned and torn down in the early 1980s after O'Leary moved to a new location in 1979.

== Athletics ==
Until 2009, TFHS was among the largest high schools in the state, classified as 5A (enrollment over 1,280 students) by the IHSAA. With the opening of Canyon Ridge High School in western Twin Falls in August 2009, both schools were classified as 4A (four-year enrollment between 640 and 1,279). A crosstown rivalry between TFHS and CRHS has since developed.

With the move to down to 4A in 2009, TFHS also changed conferences. It is currently a member of the Great Basin (West) Conference, competing against Canyon Ridge, Burley, Jerome, Minico, and Wood River, all located in south central Idaho's Magic Valley.

Twin Falls won the 5A state championship in football in 2004 and in boys' basketball in 2006. After dropping to Class 4A, the Bruins won the boys' state basketball championship in 2010, and the state baseball championship in 2011 and 2014.

The water polo team and bowling team won state championships in 2007. The boys' cross country has won three state titles in a row since 2007, and both golf teams have won many state titles, as well. The Bruin track team won many championships in the 1970s and continue to be a state power. The last state team track championship was in 1997. The boys' soccer team became state champions in 1992, only three years after the team was founded.

=== State titles ===
Boys

- Football (1): 2004
- Cross Country (6): fall 1970, 1971, 1976, 2007, 2008; (4A) 2009
- Soccer (1): 1992 (unofficial until 2000)
- Basketball (3): 1974, 2006; (4A) 2010, 2014
- Baseball (4): 1988, 1990; (4A) 2011, 2014
- Track (11): 1925, 1928, 1948, 1970, 1971, 1972, 1973, 1975, 1976, 1993, 1997
- Golf (18): 1956, 1959, 1960, 1963, 1964, 1969, 1970, 1972, 1973, 1981, 1993, 1997, 2005, 2007; (4A) 2011, 2012, 2013, 2014

Girls

- Cross Country (8): 1974, 1975, 1976, 1977, 1978, 1979, 1981, 2016, 2024
- Track (9): 1971, 1972, 1973, 1976, 1978, 1979, 1980, 1983, 1987
- Golf (11): 1994, 1995, 1996, 2000, 2001, 2002, 2004, 2005, 2007, 2008, 2009
- Soccer (1): 2021
- Volleyball (1): 2024

Coed

- Tennis (1): 2000

== Enrollment ==
Twin Falls High School's final year as the only regular public high school in Twin Falls was 2008–09. The year also represented the final year Twin Falls High School did not include 9th grade. Beginning in August 2009, both Twin Falls and Canyon Ridge included grades 9 through 12. Twin Falls High School draws its students from the eastern half of the city.

== Notable alumni ==
- Keith G. Allred – Columbia and Harvard professor, mediator, 2010 Idaho gubernatorial candidate, Class of 1983
- Bruce Bastian – WordPerfect co-founder, Class of 1966
- G. Richard Bevan – Idaho Supreme Court justice, Class of 1977
- King Block – college football coach, Class of 1947
- Paul Durham – musician, lead singer Black Lab, Class of 1986
- Logan Easley – professional baseball player
- Mark Felt – Watergate informant "Deep Throat", FBI executive, Class of 1931
- H. George Frederickson – president of Eastern Washington University 1977–1987, University of Kansas professor, Class of 1952
- Bob Martyn – professional baseball player (Kansas City Athletics), Class of 1948
- Gary Puckett – pop singer, musician, Gary Puckett and the Union Gap, Class of 1960
- Andy Toolson – Utah Jazz NBA player, BYU basketball player, BYU assistant basketball coach, Class of 1984
- Cy Sneed – professional baseball player
- Allyson Swan – 2004 Miss Rodeo Idaho, 2005 Miss Rodeo America first runner-up, 2006 Miss Idaho USA, Class of 2001
- Ralf Youtz – musician, Class of 1990

== See also ==
- List of high schools in Idaho
