= Michael J. Squier =

United States Army general

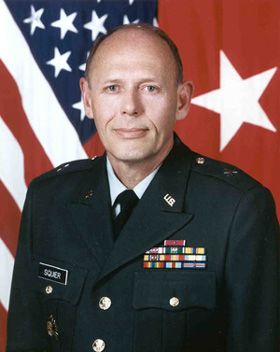
- Brigadier General Michael J. Squier as Deputy Director of the National Guard Bureau
- Born: May 17, 1946 (age 80); Boise, Idaho, U.S.
- Military career
- Allegiance: United States of America
- Branch: United States Army
- Service years: 1963–2002
- Rank: Brigadier General
- Unit: Army National Guard
- Commands: 116th Heavy Equipment Maintenance Company; Commandant of the Idaho Military Academy; 145th Support Battalion; Equipment Maintenance Center, 29th Area Support Group
- Awards: Legion of Merit; Meritorious Service Medal; Army Commendation Medal; Air Force Commendation Medal

Michael J. Squier (born May 17, 1946) is a retired United States Army Brigadier General who served as Deputy Director of the Army National Guard.

== Early life ==
Michael J. Squier was born in Boise, Idaho, on May 17, 1946. He enlisted in the Idaho Army National Guard in 1963, and graduated from Borah High School in 1964.

== Start of military career ==
Squier received his commission after completing Officer Candidate School in 1965. He advanced through several assignments in Idaho, including platoon leader with the 116th Ordnance Company; Tactical Officer at the Idaho Military Academy; Platoon Leader and later Commander of the 116th Heavy Equipment Maintenance Company; and Commandant of the Idaho Military Academy.

== Later military career ==
In 1978 Squier became a full-time member of the National Guard and was assigned as a Staff Officer in the National Guard Bureau’s Mobilization Readiness Division. He subsequently served as Assistant Executive to the Chief of the National Guard Bureau.

In 1986 Squier received a Bachelor of Science degree in Business Management from the University of Maryland, and he completed the United States Army War College in 1987.

From July, 1987 to November, 1988 was Commander of the 145th Support Battalion, a unit of the 116th Cavalry Brigade. From November, 1988 to May, 1991 he was Commander of the Equipment Maintenance Center for the 29th Area Support Group, a subordinate command of United States Army Europe.

From May to November, 1991 Squier was Deputy Chief of Public Affairs at the National Guard Bureau. From November, 1991 to September, 1995 he served as Chief of the Readiness Division at NGB.

Squier served as Executive Officer to the Chief of the National Guard Bureau from September, 1995 to September, 1996. He was assigned as Chief of Staff at the National Guard Bureau from September, 1996 to February, 1998.

In February, 1998 Squier was appointed Deputy Director of the Army National Guard and promoted to Brigadier General. He served until retiring in September, 2002.

== Military education ==
In addition to being a graduate of the University of Maryland and the Army War College, Squier completed: the Maintenance Officer Management Course; Infantry Officer Advanced Course, and United States Army Command and General Staff College.

== Post military career ==
Squier has been employed by defense contractors in the Washington, D.C. area, including CACI. He resides in Manassas, Virginia.

== Awards and decorations ==
General Squier has received the following awards:

Left Side

| 1st row | | Legion of Merit with 1 bronze Oak Leaf Cluster | |
| 2nd row | Meritorious Service Medal with 2 bronze Oak Leaf Clusters | Army Commendation Medal with 2 bronze Oak Leaf Clusters | Air Force Commendation Medal |
| 3rd row | Army Reserve Components Achievement Medal with 1 bronze Oak Leaf Cluster | National Defense Service Medal | Armed Forces Reserve Medal with gold Hourglass Device |
| 4th row | Army Service Ribbon | Overseas Service Ribbon | Army Reserve Components Overseas Training Ribbon with numeral 2 |
| Badges | Army Staff Identification Badge | | |

=== Additional awards ===
Squier is a recipient of the National Infantry Association’s Order of Saint Maurice (Primicerius).

== Chronological list of assignments ==
1. September, 1965 – April, 1969, Platoon Leader, 116th Ordnance Company, Boise, Idaho
2. May, 1969 – July, 1971, Tactical Officer, Idaho Military Academy, Idaho Army National Guard, Boise, Idaho
3. August, 1971 – September, 1977, Platoon Leader, later Commander, 116th Heavy Equipment Maintenance Company, Boise, Idaho
4. September, 1977 – March, 1978, Commandant, Idaho Military Academy, Idaho Army National Guard, Boise, Idaho
5. March, 1978 – November, 1982, Staff Officer, National Guard Bureau, Mobilization Readiness Division, Washington, D.C.
6. November, 1982 – June, 1986, Assistant Executive to Chief, National Guard Bureau, Washington, DC
7. July, 1986 – July, 1987, Student, Army War College, Carlisle Barracks, Pennsylvania
8. July, 1987 – November, 1988, Commander, 145th Support Battalion, 116th Cavalry Brigade
9. November, 1988 – May, 1991, Commander, Equipment Maintenance Center, 29th Area Support Group, United States Army Europe
10. May, 1991 – October, 1991, Deputy Chief, Public Affairs, National Guard Bureau, Arlington, Virginia
11. November, 1991 – September, 1995, Chief, Readiness Division, Army National Guard Readiness Center, Arlington, Virginia
12. September, 1995 – September, 1996, Executive Officer to the Chief, National Guard Bureau, Washington, DC
13. September, 1996 – February, 1998, Chief of Staff, Army National Guard, The Pentagon, Washington, D.C.
14. March, 1998 – September, 2002, Deputy Director, Army National Guard, Arlington, Virginia

== Effective dates of promotions ==
- Brigadier General, March 1, 1998
- Colonel, April 1, 1991
- Lieutenant Colonel, December 10, 1984
- Major, February 25, 1980
- Captain, February 26, 1972
- First Lieutenant, September 22, 1968
- Second Lieutenant, September 23, 1965
