= List of mayors of Twin Falls, Idaho =

The following is a list of mayors of the city of Twin Falls, Idaho, United States.

- Paul S. Bickel, c.1904
- Fred A. Voigt, c.1907
- Carl J. Hahn, 1907-1909
- Carlos O. Meigs, c.1912-1913
- Everett M. Sweeley, c.1915-1916
- Shad Hodgin, c.1923
- Richard E. Bobier, c.1927-1933
- Duncan McD. Johnston, c.1933-1937
- Lem A. Chapin, c.1937-1939
- Joe K. Koehler, c.1939-1943
- Bert A. Sweet, c.1943-1947
- Herbert G. Lauterbach, c.1947-1949
- Rulon J. Schwendiman, c.1949-1952
- J. H. Latimore, c.1953
- A. F. Nelson, c.1954-1955
- J. “Ted” Davis
- Egon H. Kroll, c.1968
- Frank H. Feldtman, c.1970-1971
- Winston Jones, c.1975
- Paul Ostyn, c.1977
- Hank Woodall, c.1980
- Emery Peterson, c.1981-1985
- Doug Vollmer, c.1988
- Gale Kleinkopf, c.1994-1999
- Elaine Steele, c.2000-2001
- Lance Clow, c.2002-2003, 2006-2009
- Glenda Dwight, c.2005
- Don Hall, c.2010-2011, 2014
- Greg Lanting, c.2012-2013
- Shawn Barigar, c.2017-2019
- Suzanne Hawkins, 2020-2021
- Ruth Pierce, 2022-2026
- Jason Brown 2026-present

== See also ==
- Twin Falls history
