= Capital High School (Boise, Idaho) =

Coordinates: 43.644°N 116.282°W

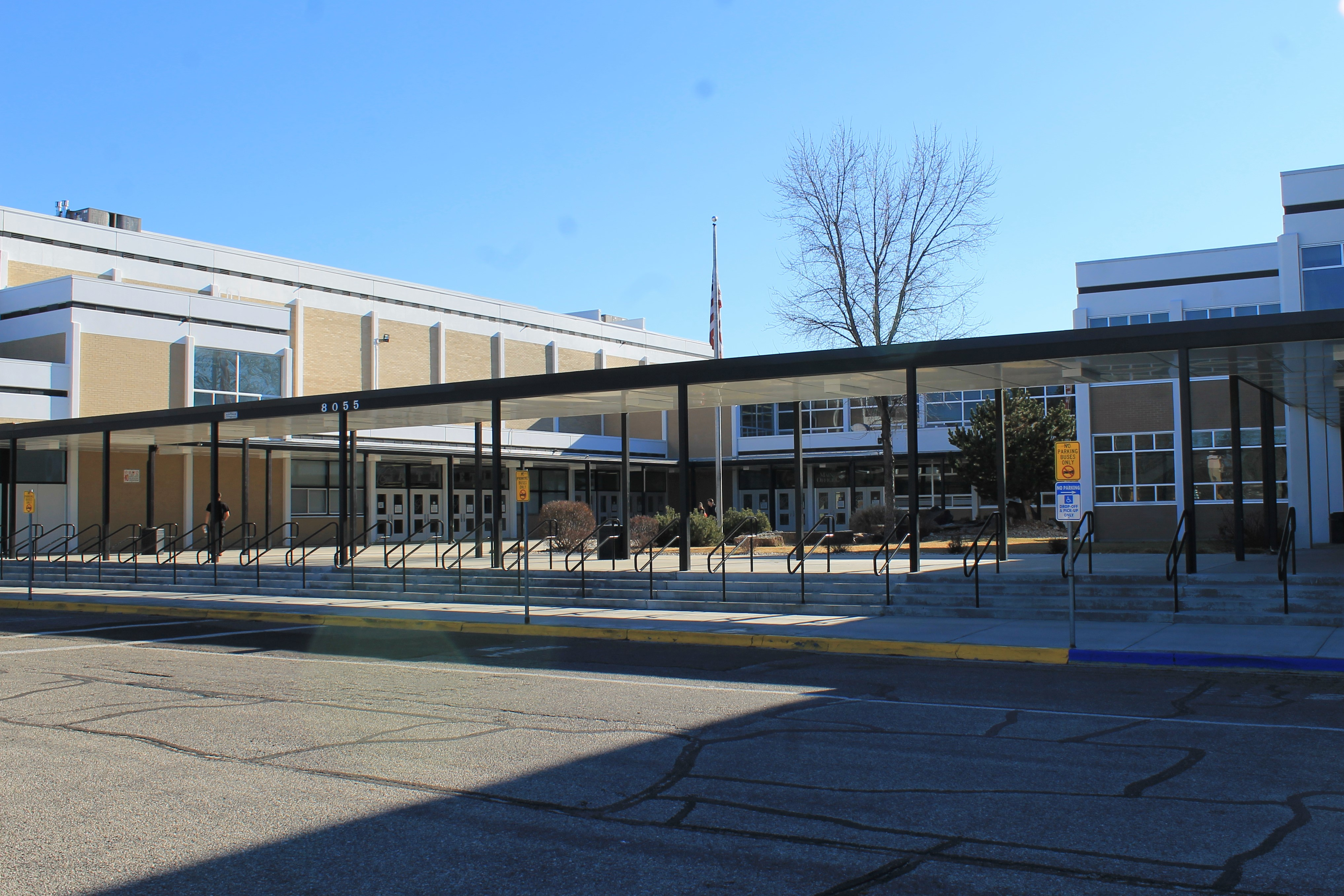
- View from northwest in 2019
- 8055 Goddard Road; Boise, Idaho; United States

Information
- Type: Public
- Established: September 7, 1965; 61 years ago
- School district: Boise S.D. #1
- Principal: Derek Gardner
- Teaching staff: 72.71 (FTE)
- Grades: 10–12
- Enrollment: 1,162 (2023–2024)
- Student to teacher ratio: 15.98
- Colors: Gold, silver, and black
- Athletics: IHSAA Class 6A
- Athletics conference: Southern Idaho (6A) (SIC)
- Mascot: Eagle
- Newspaper: Flight
- Yearbook: Talon
- Feeder schools: Fairmont Junior High; Riverglen Junior High
- Elevation: 2,680 ft (820 m) AMSL
- Website: Capital High School

Capital High School is a three-year public secondary school in Boise, Idaho, United States. Opened 61 years ago in the fall of 1965, it was the third of four public high schools constructed in the Boise School District, and serves its northern portion. The other high schools are Boise (1902) in the east, Borah (1958) in the southwest, and Timberline (1998) in the southeast.

The Capital High boundary includes sections of Eagle and Garden City.

== Athletics ==
Capital competes in athletics in IHSAA Class 6A in the Southern Idaho Conference (6A) (SIC). The tennis team has won 16 state titles, including five consecutive from 1972 to 1976. The boys basketball team won four consecutive A-1 (now 6A) state titles from 1975 to 1978.

=== State titles ===
Boys

- Football (2): fall 1983, 1991 (official with introduction of playoffs, fall 1979)
  - (unofficial poll titles - 2) - fall 1974, 1977 (poll introduced in 1963, through 1978)
- Cross Country (2): fall 1965, 1977, 2001, 2004, 2013
- Basketball (6): 1968, 1975, 1976, 1977, 1978, 2014
- Baseball (3): 1989, 2009, 2014 (records not kept by IHSAA)
- Track (5): 1974, 1979, 1980, 1985, 2009, 2015
- Golf (1): 1974
- Tennis - (combined until 2008, see below)

Girls

- Cross Country (1): fall 1980
- Basketball (1): 1977
- Track (3): 1981, 1984, 1988

Combined

- Tennis (16): 1968, 1972, 1973, 1974, 1975, 1976, 1978, 1981, 1985, 1988, 1989, 1992, 1993, 2002, 2006, 2007 (combined until 2008)

== Notable alumni ==
- Matthew Barney (1985), artist
- Geraldo Boldewijn, American football player
- Randy Davison, American actor
- Ben Driebergen, former U.S. Marine, winner of Survivor: Heroes v. Healers v. Hustlers
- Hailey Duke, alpine ski racer
- Annette Glenn, Michigan House of Representatives.
- John Grant (1968), NFL defensive lineman
- Bryan Harsin (1994), college football head coach
- Ernie Hughes, NFL player
- Marques McFadden (1995), former NFL offensive guard
- Jake Plummer (1993), former NFL quarterback
- Tobias Read (1993), Secretary of State of Oregon
- Bill Sali (1972), former congressman
- Gary Stevens (1981), thoroughbred horse racing jockey
- Curtis Stigers (1983), musician
- Gary Wimmer, American football player
