= Timberline High School (Boise, Idaho) =

Coordinates: 43.578°N 116.175°W

- 701 E. Boise Avenue; Boise, Idaho; United States

Information
- Type: Public
- Established: 1998
- School district: Boise School District#1
- Principal: Chad Wright
- Teaching staff: 70.19 (FTE)
- Grades: 10–12
- Enrollment: 1,391 (2023-2024)
- Student to teacher ratio: 19.82 (2023-2024)
- Colors: Royal blue, silver, and black
- Athletics: IHSAA Class 6A
- Athletics conference: Southern Idaho (6A) (SIC)
- Mascot: Wolf
- Rivals: Boise, Borah, Capital
- Newspaper: The Timberline Paw Print
- Yearbook: Arbor Vitae
- Feeder schools: East Junior High; Les Bois Junior High
- Elevation: 2,740 ft (840 m) AMSL
- Website: Timberline High School

Timberline High School is a three-year public secondary school in Boise, Idaho. Opened in August 1998, it is the fourth and newest traditional high school in the Boise School District, serving its southeast portion. Originally opened as Les Bois Junior High in 1994, it was expanded and the junior high was rebuilt at a different location. The school colors are royal blue, silver, and black and the mascot is a wolf.

== Athletics ==
Timberline competes in athletics in IHSAA Class 6A in the Southern Idaho Conference (6A) (SIC).

=== State titles ===
Boys

- Soccer (6): fall 2001, 2014, 2015, 2021, 2022, 2023
- Baseball (6): 1999, 2000, 2004, 2010, 2013, 2015
- Hockey (1): 2019

Girls

- Soccer (2): fall 2007, 2008
- Basketball (2): 2003, 2022
- Softball (2): 2005, 2009
- Golf (1): 2006
- Tennis (3): 2016, 2018, 2019

== Academics ==
Timberline High School has a successful program for the National Science Bowl competition, earning a second-place finish in the 2019 Western Idaho Regional competition and winning the 2020 Western Idaho Regional competition.

Students have tracked and studied a group of wild wolves, called the Timberline pack, since 2003. The biologists who track the pack noticed its den in the Boise National Forest was empty in the spring of 2020. The Idaho Department of Fish and Game wolf mortality list showed that pups were killed by the U.S. Department of Agriculture Wildlife Services branch. The federal agents killed the pups in order to force the adult wolves to relocate and to reduce the predators' population as they can pose a threat to wildlife and livestock.

== Notable alumni ==
- Jeret Peterson, freestyle skier: silver medalist in aerials, 2010 Winter Olympics, class of 2000
- Nate Potter, professional American football player
- Michael Stefanic, professional baseball player
