= Sage International School =

Location
- 431 E Parkcenter Boulevard; Boise, Idaho 83706; United States; 43.59520°N 116.17871°W

Information
- School type: Charter
- Motto: Keep Sage Weird
- Established: 2010
- Founders: Bill Carter, Kim Carter-Cram, Mike Cram, Nancy Glenn, Donald J. Keller
- School district: Sage International School District no. 475
- Director: Emily Downey
- Principal: K-5 Kate Hunter 6-8 Zach Parker 9-12 Brandy Burkett
- Grades: K-12
- Website: www.sageinternationalschool.org

Sage International School is a public K-12 charter school program which is a member of the International Baccalaureate Organization.

== History ==
Sage was started in 2010 by Don Keller, Bill Carter, Kim Carter-Cram, Mike Cram, and Nancy Glenn, and started with 214 students in the old Sara Lee Foods offices. The school expanded in 2013, to Downtown Boise in the old mutual creamery building, to eventually expanding to the Parkcenter Mall in 2014. The first graduating class was in 2015–16. Between the two buildings that make up the school, the smaller of the two, Summit, includes most high school classes, whereas the larger of the two, Everest, includes K-8 classes with a few odd high school classrooms mixed in. Unusual among area schools, Sage is on a Monday through Thursday student schedule, with the teachers doing in-service work on Fridays, and students stay home on Fridays.

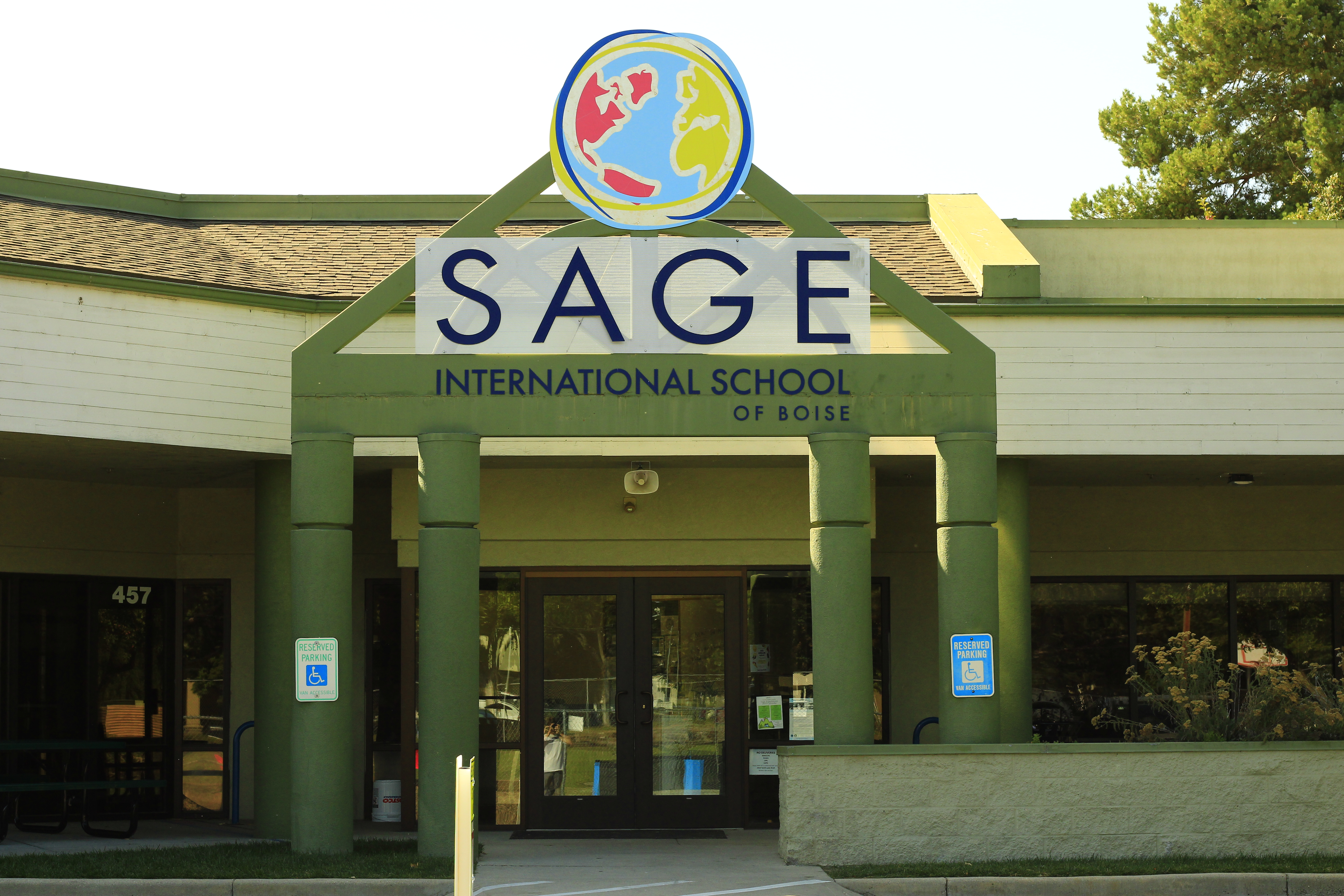
2025 image of the Sage Summit building

== Electives ==
As of the 2026-27 school year, Sage International offers World Religions and Art as two-year electives for Juniors and Seniors, which you commit to in your Junior year and cannot swap. For Freshmen and Sophomores, Sage offers Journalism, Physical Education, Design, Art, and Computer Science.

== Curriculum ==
Sage International is an IB (International Baccalaureate) School, following the International Baccalaureate curriculum. They have both the CP (Career Programme) and DP (Diploma Programme) pathways available for their students, allowing for significant headstarts in their post-high school endeavours.
