= Marques McFadden =

American gridiron football player (born 1978)

No. 79
- Position: Guard

Personal information
- Born: September 12, 1978 (age 48); St. Louis, Missouri, U.S.
- Listed height: 6 ft 4 in (1.93 m)
- Listed weight: 317 lb (144 kg)

Career information
- High school: Boise (ID) Capital
- College: Arizona
- NFL draft: 2001: undrafted

Career history
- Green Bay Packers (2001)*; Atlanta Falcons (2002)*; → Amsterdam Admirals (2002)*; Dallas Cowboys (2002); New England Patriots (2003)*; BC Lions (2004)
- * Offseason or practice squad member only

Awards and highlights
- Second-team All-Pac-10 (2000)

Career NFL statistics
- Games played: 4
- Stats at Pro Football Reference

Marques Arthur McFadden (born September 12, 1978) is an American former professional football player who was an offensive guard in the National Football League (NFL) for the Atlanta Falcons and Dallas Cowboys. He also was a member of the BC Lions in the Canadian Football League (CFL). He played college football for the Arizona Wildcats.

== Early life ==
McFadden attended Capital High School, where he practiced football and baseball. He received second-team All-state and All-conference honors as a senior.

He accepted a football scholarship from the University of Arizona. He missed the 1997 season due to academic issues. He became a starter at right guard as a junior, helping running back Trung Canidate rush for 1,643 yards on 253 carries (6.3-yard avg.).

As a senior, he started at left tackle, left guard and right tackle.

== Professional career ==
McFadden was signed as an undrafted free agent by the Green Bay Packers after the 2001 NFL draft. He was waived on August 26.

On January 30, 2002, he was signed as a free agent by the Atlanta Falcons. He was allocated to the Amsterdam Admirals of NFL Europe, helping quarterback Kevin Daft to finish second in the league with an 83.0 rating and running back Rafael Cooper to finish fourth with 751 rushing yards. He was released by the Falcons before the start of the season on September 1 and signed to the practice squad on September 3.

On September 18, 2002, he was signed by the Dallas Cowboys from the Atlanta Falcons' practice squad, to provide depth because of injuries on the offensive line. He was used as a backup offensive guard, until suffering a left shoulder torn labrum in the seventh game against the Arizona Cardinals. He was placed on the injured reserve list on October 24. He was released on August 11, 2003.

On August 13, 2003, he signed with the New England Patriots. He was released on August 15.

In May 2004, he was signed by the BC Lions of the Canadian Football League. He was a starter at right guard and right tackle, helping the team reach the 92nd Grey Cup.
