= Twin Falls School District =

Public school district in Idaho

Twin Falls School District No. 411

Location
- 201 Main Avenue West Twin Falls, Idaho 83301-6103 Twin Falls County United States

District information
- Type: Public school district
- Motto: "To provide a quality education necessary for students to be successful in life."
- Grades: PreK-12
- Established: July 14, 1907; 117 years ago
- Superintendent: Brady Dickinson, PhD
- Asst. superintendent(s): Becky Jaynes – Assessment and Federal Programs Ryan Nesmith, Ed. S. – Assessment and Federal Programs Claudia Paredez – Administrative Assistant, Assessment and Federal Programs
- NCES District ID: 1603240

Students and staff
- Students: 9,400 (2022)
- Teachers: 450 Certified Staff
- Staff: 400+ Classified Employees

Other information
- Website: www.tfsd.org

The Twin Falls School District #411 is one of 115 public school districts in Idaho. It is given the district number 411 as it is in the fourth region of Idaho. The Twin Falls School District is headquartered in Twin Falls, Idaho.

Current-year tax rates for all Idaho school districts are available on the Idaho State Department of Education website.

== Schools ==
Twin Falls School District has sixteen schools in its district. As of 2021-22 school year, TFSD had a total student count of 9,399, with a Classroom Teachers (FTE) of 518.65, and a Student–teacher ratio of 18.12.

=== High schools ===
==== Traditional ====
- Twin Falls High School
- Canyon Ridge High School

==== Alternative ====
- Magic Valley High School

=== Junior high schools ===
==== Traditional ====
- O'Leary Middle School
- Robert Stuart Middle School
- South Hills Middle School

==== Alternative ====
- Bridge Academy Middle School

=== Elementary schools ===
- Bickel Elementary
- Harrison Elementary
- I.B. Perrine Elementary
- Lincoln Elementary
- Morningside Elementary
- Oregon Trail Elementary
- Pillar Falls Elementary
- Rock Creek Elementary
- Sawtooth Elementary
