= Council School District =

Public school district in Council, Idaho, US

Council School District 13

Address
- 101 East Bleeker Ave Council, Idaho 83612; United States

District information
- Type: Public
- Grades: K-12

Other information
- 1A
- Website: Council School District 13

Council School District 13 is a small, rural, regular local school district in Council, Idaho. It serves Council Elementary School and Council Junior-Senior High School.

The district's enrollment in 2023 was 323 K-12 students. Toal appropriated funding for 2023–2024 was just over $3.1 million.

The five-year graduation rate for the cohort class of 2021 was 80.2%, slightly below the Idaho state rate of 82.3%.

In 2002, the District began looking for alternative heating for Council Elementary and Council Junior-Senior High School buildings, and converted from costly oil burning radiant heating to heating with bio-mass fuel, consisting of wood chips. The new biomass system was "Idaho's first public school biomass heating system", and was projected to save Council $1 million on fuel over a 15-year period.
