= Pleasant Valley School District (Idaho) =

School district in Idaho, United States

Pleasant Valley School District #364

Location
- 28026 Juniper Mt. Road, Jordan Valley, Oregon, 97910 Owyhee County, Idaho United States

District information
- Type: Public
- Motto: Meeting the needs of each student
- Grades: K–8

Students and staff
- Students: 9 (September 1, 2015)
- Staff: 1 teacher, 1 administrator, 1 educational assistant, 1 clerk/business manager

Other information
- Website: www.pleasantvalleyschools.org

Pleasant Valley School District #364 is a school district in the U.S. state of Idaho. serving the greater Pleasant Valley in Owyhee County, Idaho, in one school, Pleasant Valley Elementary School. Its administrative offices are located in Jordan Valley, Oregon.

As of the 2018–19 school year, the District had an average daily attendance of 5.69 students.
