= Twin Falls, Idaho =

- City
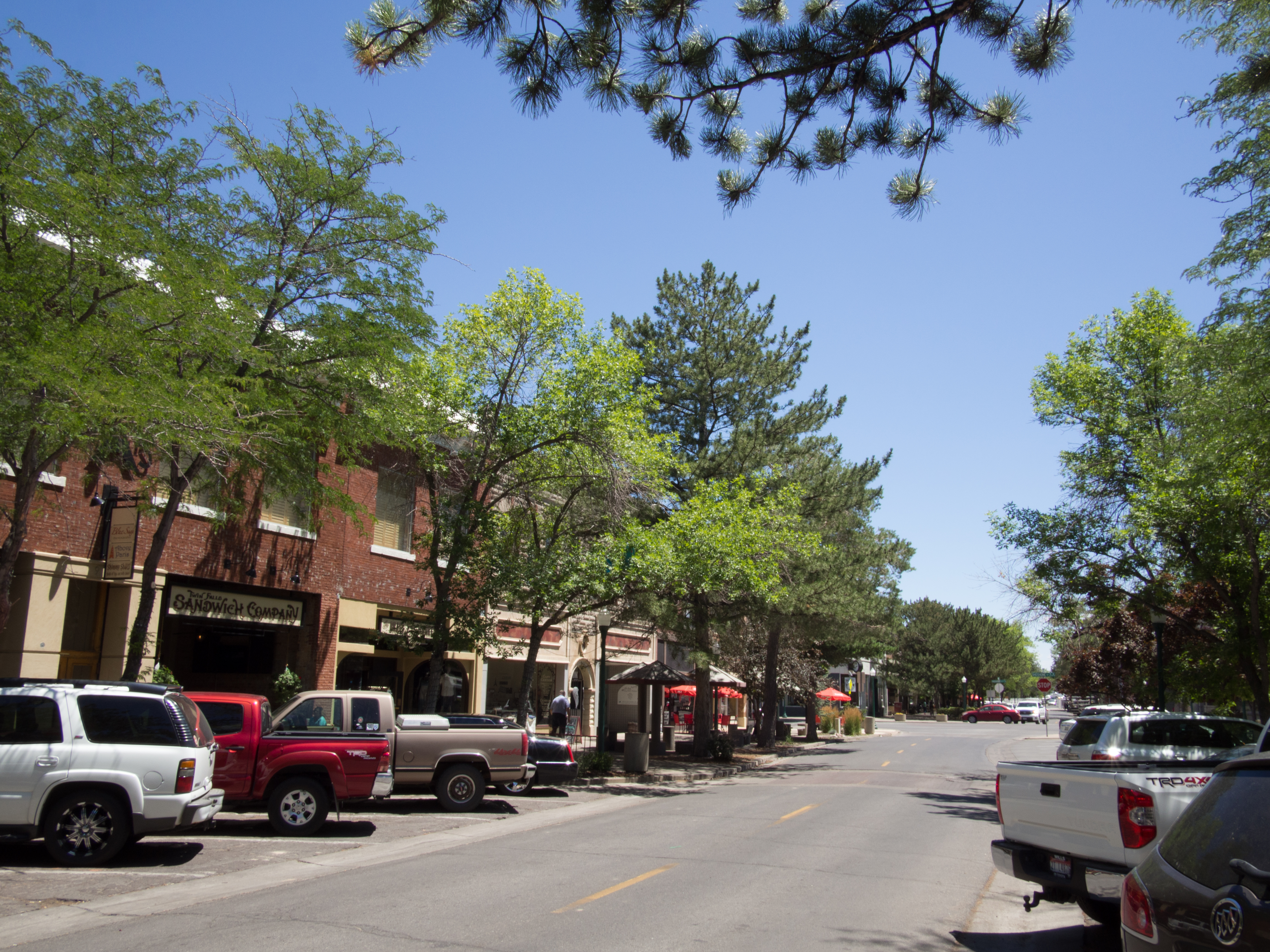
- Downtown Twin Falls in 2016

- Seal
- Nickname: The Iowa Of Idaho
- Motto: People Serving People
- Location of Twin Falls in Twin Falls County, Idaho

- Location within Idaho Location within the United States
- Coordinates: 42.564°N 114.46°W
- Country: United States
- State: Idaho
- County: Twin Falls
- Founded: 1904
- Incorporated: April 12, 1905

Government
  - Type: Council-manager
  - Mayor: Jason Brown
  - Vice Mayor: Craig Hawkins
  - City Council: Christopher Reid; Spencer Cutler; Ruth Pierce; Cherie Vollmer; Grayson Stone; Nathan Murray

Area
  - City: 19.987 sq mi (51.766 km^{2})
  - Land: 19.870 sq mi (51.463 km^{2})
  - Water: 0.117 sq mi (0.303 km^{2}) 0.59%
- Elevation: 3,740 ft (1,140 m)

Population (2020)
  - City: 51,807
  - Estimate (2024): 55,589
  - Rank: US: 738th ID: 8th
  - Density: 2,607.3/sq mi (1,006.7/km^{2})
  - Urban: 58,808 (US: 459th)
  - Metro: 122,565 (US: 328th)
- Time zone: UTC−7 (Mountain (MST))
  - Summer (DST): UTC−6 (MDT)
- ZIP Codes: 83301, 83302, 83303
- Area codes: 208 and 986
- FIPS code: 16-82810
- GNIS feature ID: 2412120
- U.S. Route(s): link = U.S. Route 30 in Idaho link = U.S. Route 93 in Idaho
- Website: tfid.org

Twin Falls is the county seat of and the largest city in Twin Falls County, Idaho, United States. The population was 51,807 at the 2020 census, and was estimated at 55,589 in 2024. In the Magic Valley region, Twin Falls is the largest city in a 100-mile (160 km) radius, and is the regional commercial center for south-central Idaho and northeastern Nevada. It is the principal city of the Twin Falls metropolitan statistical area, which officially includes the entirety of Twin Falls and Jerome Counties. The border town resort community of Jackpot, Nevada, 50 mi (80 km) south at the state line, is unofficially considered part of the greater Twin Falls area.

Located on a broad plain at the south rim of the Snake River Canyon, Twin Falls is where daredevil Evel Knievel attempted to jump across the canyon in 1974 on a steam-powered rocket. The jump site is northeast of central Twin Falls, midway between Shoshone Falls and the Perrine Bridge.

== History ==
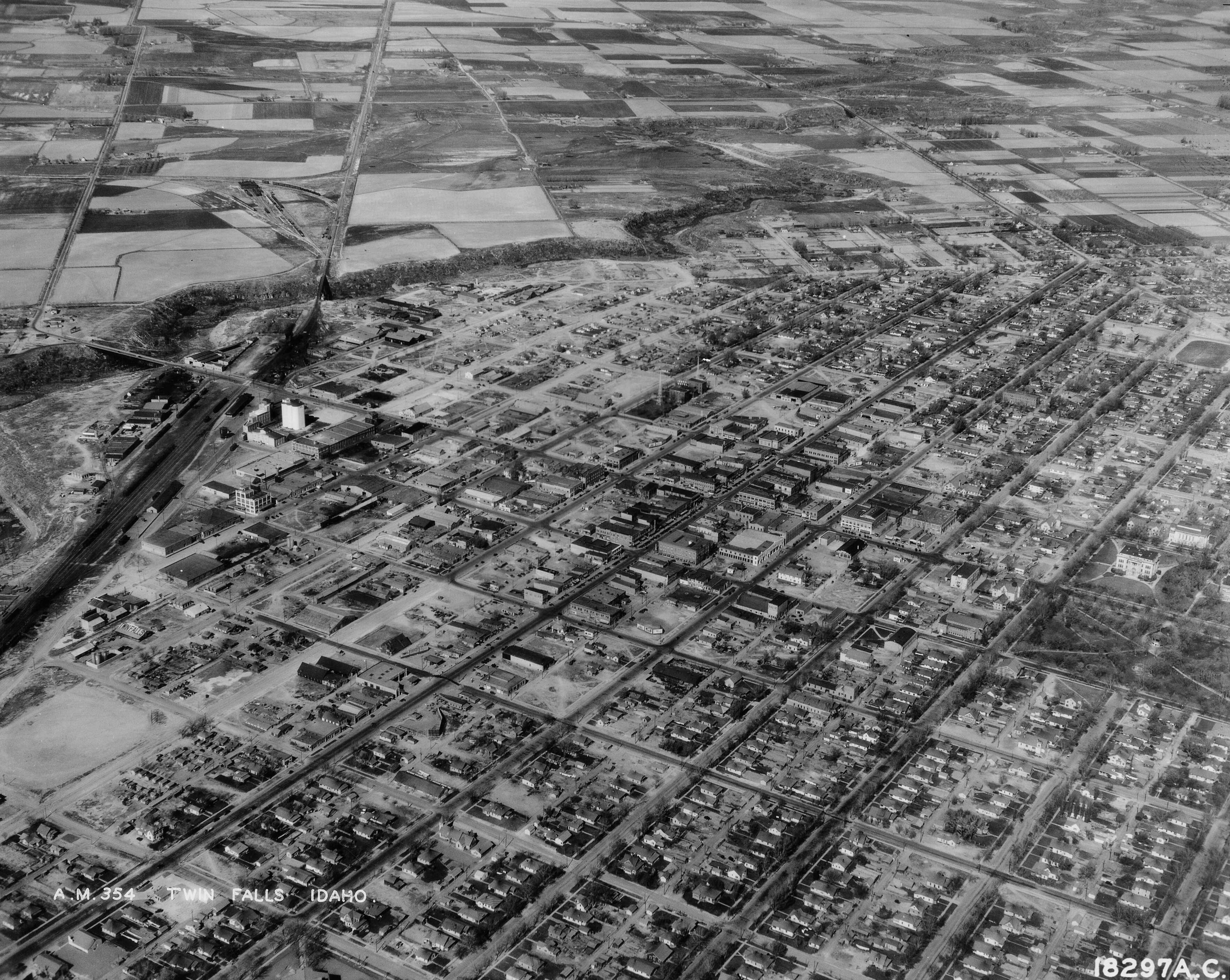
View of Twin Falls, 1934

Excavations at Wilson Butte Cave near Twin Falls in 1959 revealed evidence of human activity, including arrowheads, that rank among the oldest dated artifacts in North America. Later Native American tribes predominant in the area included the Northern Shoshone and Bannock.

The first people of European ancestry to visit the Twin Falls area are believed to be members of a group led by American Wilson Price Hunt, who attempted to blaze an all-water trail westward from St. Louis, Missouri, to Astoria, Oregon, in 1811 and 1812. Hunt's expedition met with disaster; much of his expedition was destroyed and one man was killed in rapids on the Snake River known as Caldron Linn near present-day Murtaugh. Hunt and the surviving members of his expedition completed the journey to Astoria by land.

In 1812 and 1813, Robert Stuart successfully led an overland expedition eastward from Astoria to St. Louis, which passed through the Twin Falls area. Stuart's route formed the basis of what became the Oregon Trail. Some 150 years later, Robert Stuart Middle School in Twin Falls was named in his honor.

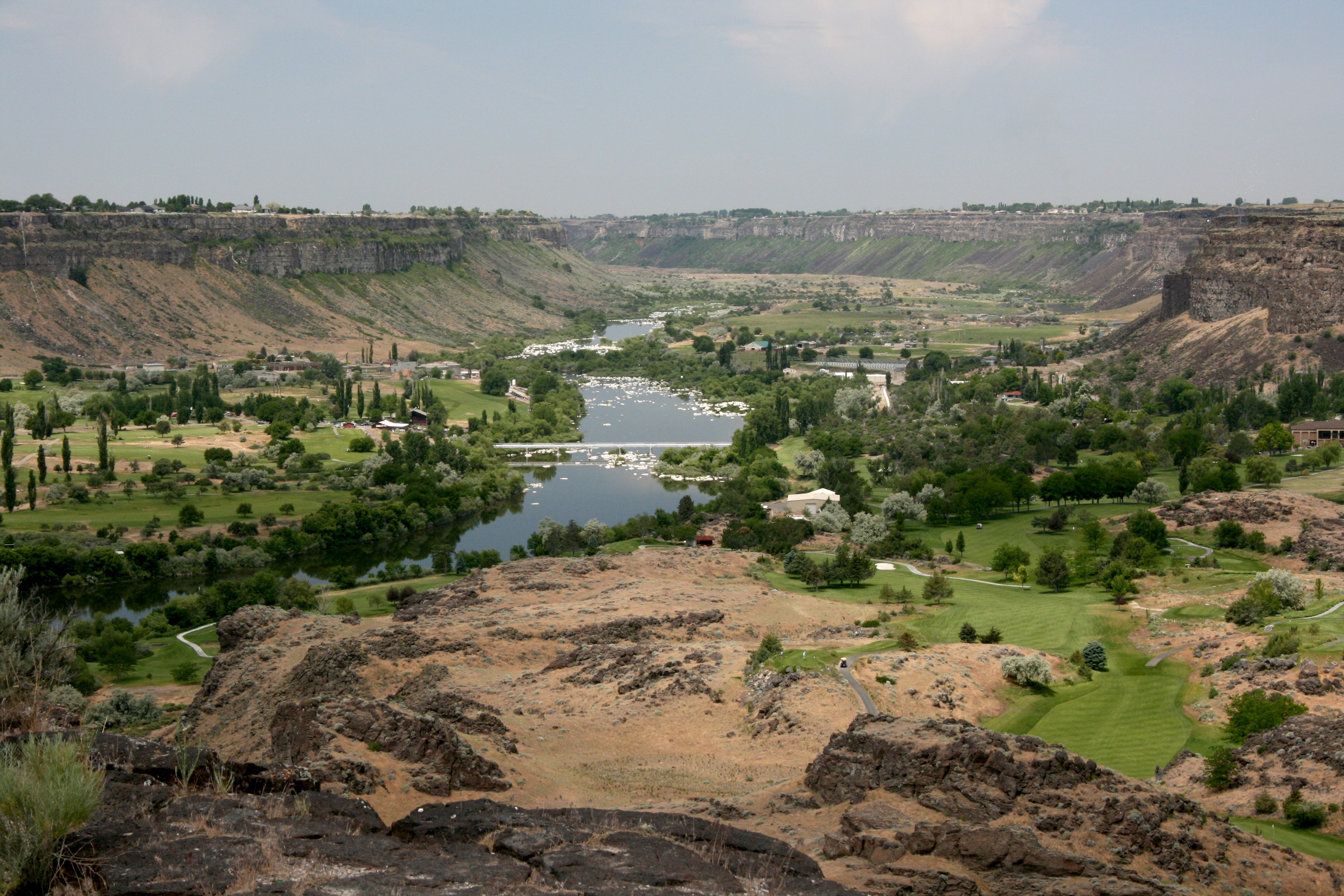
Snake River Canyon at Twin Falls, Idaho

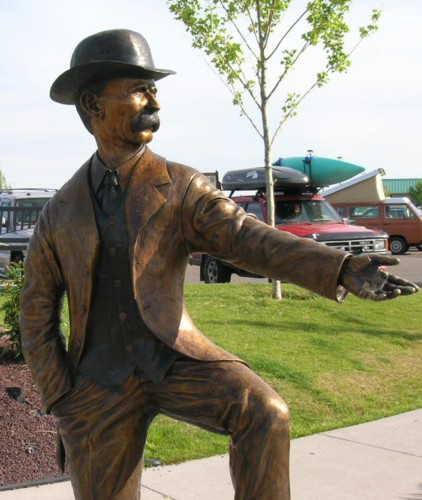
Statue of I.B. Perrine, founder of Twin Falls, Idaho

The first permanent settlement in the area was a stage stop established in 1864 at Rock Creek near the present-day townsite. By 1890, a handful of successful agricultural operations were in the Snake River Canyon, but the lack of infrastructure and the canyon's geography made irrigating the dry surrounding area improbable at best.

To address this issue in 1900, I. B. Perrine founded the Twin Falls Land and Water Company, largely to build an irrigation canal system for the area. After an August 1900 area survey of 244,025 acres (98,753 ha) in October 1900, the company was granted the necessary water rights to begin construction of the irrigation system. Several lots in the surveyed area were set aside specifically for future townsites. These lots eventually became the settlements of Twin Falls, Kimberly, Buhl, Filer, Hansen, and Murtaugh. In 1902, the project nearly failed, as most of the original investors pulled out, with only Salt Lake City businessman Stanley Milner maintaining a stake in the company.

By 1903, Perrine, who had been a successful farmer and rancher in the Snake River Canyon, had obtained private financing from Milner and others under the provisions of the Carey Act of 1894 to build a dam on the Snake River near Caldron Linn. Completed in 1905, Milner Dam and its accompanying canals made commercial irrigation outside the Snake River Canyon practical for the first time. As a result, Perrine is generally credited as the founder of Twin Falls.

A land drawing was held for the future townsite in July 1903, with disappointing results. A much more successful drawing was held in October 1904. Twin Falls city was founded in 1904 as a planned community, designed by celebrated Franco-American architect Emmanuel Louis Masqueray, with proceeds from sales of townsite lots going toward construction of irrigation canals. Twin Falls was incorporated as a village on April 12, 1905. The city is named for a nearby waterfall on the Snake River of the same name. In 1907, Twin Falls became the seat of the newly formed Twin Falls County.

After Milner Dam was constructed, agricultural production in south-central Idaho increased substantially. In 1909, the privately owned Twin Falls Land and Water Company was reorganized as the shareholder-owned Twin Falls Canal Company. Twin Falls became a major regional economic center serving the agriculture industry, a role which it has sustained to the present day. The city became a processing center for several agricultural commodities, notably beans and sugar beets. In later years, other food-processing operations augmented the local economy. By 1960, Twin Falls had become one of Idaho's largest cities, though its origins were still within living memory for many.

Twin Falls became the center of national attention 52 years ago in September 1974, when daredevil Evel Knievel attempted to jump the Snake River Canyon in a specially modified rocket cycle. Watched by millions on closed-circuit television on a Sunday afternoon, the attempt ultimately failed due to high winds and a premature deployment of Knievel's parachute. The launch ramp's foundation lies on private land on the canyon's south rim. Less than 2 miles west (3 km) of Shoshone Falls, it is still visible (42.597°N 114.423°W).

During the last quarter of the 20th century, gradual diversification of the agriculture-based economy allowed the city to continue to grow. Major Twin Falls employers in 2006 included Dell, Glanbia and Jayco. In September 2009, Dell announced it would close its Twin Falls facility by January 2010. Later in 2010, the call center company C3 opened a facility in the former Dell location.

The College of Southern Idaho had administered a refugee program in Twin Falls from 1980 until 2024, when management was taken over by the United States Committee for Refugees and Immigrants.

On August 1, 2026, a mass shooting occurred at an In-N-Out Burger restaurant in Twin Falls. Three people were killed, and seven others were injured. The gunman was also killed during the shooting.

== Government ==
Twin Falls is one of only three Idaho cities that has a council-manager form of government. The seven-member Twin Falls city council is directly elected in nonpartisan municipal elections to four-year terms. The mayor, who holds little executive power, is periodically selected among current city council members to chair meetings, and is "considered the official representative of the city." City council meetings are usually held on Mondays.

The city's day-to-day operations are overseen by a city manager, who is appointed by the city council. The current city manager is Travis Rothweiler. The city government through various citizen boards oversees parks and recreation, planning and zoning, sanitation and garbage collection, street maintenance, and wastewater collection, and maintains police and fire departments. Twin Falls Public Library, Twin Falls Municipal Golf Course and Joslin Field-Magic Valley Regional Airport are also under the city's jurisdiction.

== Higher education ==
Twin Falls is home to the College of Southern Idaho (CSI), a large community college in the northwestern part of the city. Three state universities (Boise State University, Idaho State University, and the University of Idaho) offer classes on the CSI campus. The nursing program received money from the 2007-2008 state budget to construct a state-of-the-art nursing facility to complement the nursing program. The CSI men's basketball team won its third NJCAA Division I Championship in March 2011.

== Primary and secondary schools ==
Public schools are administered by the Twin Falls School District, including Twin Falls High School, Canyon Ridge High School, the alternative Magic Valley High School, three middle schools, and nine elementary schools. Also, Twin Falls is home to Xavier Charter School and the district was awarded best title 1C district in the state.

On March 14, 2006, registered voters approved a bond to build an additional high school. A citywide contest was held to determine the school's nickname. In November 2006, the Twin Falls school board selected "River Hawks", thus officially starting the Canyon Ridge High School River Hawks. Also on the bond were plans to make general improvements to existing school facilities and to convert the junior high schools to middle schools. These projects were completed for the 2009–10 school year. The addition of Canyon Ridge High School meant that the student population was split nearly in half. Athletics for both schools are designated 4A rather than 5A by Idaho High School Activities Association.

=== Elementary schools ===
- Bickel Elementary School (K-5)
- Harrison Developmental Preschool
- Harrison Elementary School (K-5)
- I.B. Perrine Elementary School (preschool and K-5)
- Lincoln Elementary School (K-5)
- Morningside Elementary School (K-5)
- Oregon Trail Elementary School (K-5)
- Pillar Falls Elementary School (K-5)
- Sawtooth Elementary School (K-5)
- Rock Creek Elementary School (K-5)
- St. Edward's Catholic School (K-8)

=== Middle schools ===
- O'Leary Middle School (6-8)
- Robert Stuart Middle School (6-8)
- Bridge Academy (alternative 6-8)
- South Hills Middle School (6-8)

=== High schools ===
- Canyon Ridge High School (9-12)
- Twin Falls High School (9-12)

=== Alternative high schools ===
- Magic Valley High School (9-12)

Private schools include Lighthouse Christian School, Xavier Charter School, St. Edward's Catholic School, and Twin Falls Christian Academy.

== Economy ==
Twin Falls, the state's seventh-largest city, is the fastest growing city in south-central Idaho. As of April 2011, unemployment in Twin Falls County stood at 9.5%, below Idaho's average of 9.6%. From 1998 to 2007, the unemployment rate was steadily decreasing, to a low of just under 2%. Then, in tandem with the national economy, the unemployment rate increased to nearly 9.5% as of April 2011.

Twin Falls is the home of cheese producer Glanbia Foods, a major American division of Irish food company Glanbia plc.

Falls Brand, another food company, is located in the southern part of Twin Falls. In early 2011, Falls Brands' Old Fashioned Basque Chorizo sausage won the "Hold the Mustard" award presented by the National Meat Association (NMA) during their Annual Gourmet Sausagefest.

Another mainstay is the College of Southern Idaho (CSI). Boasting a student population of 3,433, this junior college is an alternative for students not yet ready to attend a four-year university. Many students are from out-of-state and live in CSI's residential halls.

Other large employers include Amalgamated Sugar Company, makers of White Satin sugar; and Lamb Weston, which has a food-processing plant located in west Twin Falls. It employs 500 and its annual revenue is about $100 million.

In spite of a troubled national economy, Twin Falls has seen rapid development since 2006. Many major retail outlets opened stores in Twin Falls between 2006 and 2011.

In November 2009, a new Walmart Supercenter opened, bringing to the region an estimated 100 additional jobs. In October 2010, C3, a customer call center, opened in the former Dell facility. This gave a large boost to an already busy economy, providing close to 1,000 jobs. In July 2011, C3 announced it was filling another 300 C3 jobs in Twin Falls due to brisk business.

Creating 40-50 new jobs, Magic Valley Cinema 13 constructed a new theater equipped with D-BAG seating. The new entertainment center was developed in association with the unprecedented growth in the Magic Valley.

In response to a growing population base, Twin Falls County voters voted to construct a new hospital in the northwest section of Twin Falls to replace the city's existing hospital. In spring 2011, the new 700,000-sq-ft facility, St. Luke's Magic Valley, was opened. All 186 rooms are private with family accommodations.

China Mountain Wind, LLC in 2011 had proposed to construct a 300,000-acre (1,200 km^{2}) wind farm after the environmental impact is weighed. Twin Falls County was expected to generate $33.4 million in tax revenues. Local schools and services were receive a portion of the tax revenue. The construction of the wind farm was to bring to the area 400-750 full- and part-time jobs during construction and 24-46 new jobs to maintain the facility.

In 2012, Twin Falls hosted the Idaho Republican Party convention, which was expected to create more positive economic activity.

Chobani Yogurt Company, in 2012, opened the world's largest yogurt manufacturing plant, providing an additional 300 jobs to the Twin Falls community.

== Media ==
The Times-News is a local daily morning newspaper based in Twin Falls.

Over-the-air television stations include:

- KMVT (CBS) and (CW)
- KSVT-LD (FOX) and MyNetworkTV (digital substation)
- KIPT (PBS)
- KXTF (TCT)
- KTFT (NBC, semi-satellite of KTVB, Boise)
- KSAW-LD (ABC, semi-satellite of KIVI-TV, Boise)
- KYTL (independent)

Cable television subscribers also receive stations from Boise and Salt Lake City, Utah.

A number of radio stations broadcast in the Twin Falls area, including:

- 88.1 KTFY - The Bridge (Christian Worship Music)
- 88.9 KEFX - The Effect Radio Network (Modern Christian rock with over 60 stations nationwide)
- 89.9 KAWZ - CSN International (Biblical teaching with over 400 stations nationwide)
- 92.7 KTPZ - The Music Monster (Top 40)
- 95.7 KEZJ - Idaho Country (Country)
- 96.5 KLIX-FM - Kool Oldies (Oldies)
- 98.3 KSNQ - The Snake (Classic Rock)
- 99.1 KXTA - La Perrona (Regional Mexican)
- 99.9 KZDX - Hot 100 FM (Adult contemporary/Top 40)
- 102.1 KIRQ - IRock (Modern rock)
- 103.1 KEDJ - The Edge (Rock)
- 103.7 KSKI (Modern rock)
- 103.9 KDKI-LP (Adult standards/Big band/Jazz)
- 104.7 KIKX (Adult hits)
- 106.1 KKMV - Kat Kountry (Country)
- 106.7 KYUN - Canyon Country (Country)
- 970 KFTA - Juan 970 (Regional Mexican)
- 1310 KLIX - News and Talk

== Transportation ==
Twin Falls is the largest city in Idaho that is not directly on the Interstate Highway System; it is served by several major highways, including U.S. Route 30 and U.S. Route 93. Access to nearby Interstate 84 is across the canyon via the Perrine Bridge (U.S. 93); the junction is about 5 mi (8 km) north, in Jerome County. State Highway 74 provides direct access from downtown Twin Falls to southbound locations on U.S. 93, including Hollister and Rogerson, then crosses into Nevada at Jackpot and continues to a junction with Interstate 80 at Wells.

Limited commercial air service is provided at Magic Valley Regional Airport, also known as Joslin Field. As of August 2017, daily flights to Salt Lake City are available from Delta Connection (fulfilled by SkyWest Airlines) using the Canadair CRJ200. Twice-weekly service to Las Vegas was previously operated by Allegiant Air, but the airline discontinued the route in January 2012, citing insufficient ticket prices.

When Twin Falls surpassed a population of 50,000, it became federally required to provide a public transportation system for its citizens. (Read Metropolitan planning organization for more information.) On July 1, 2023, the city of Twin Falls launched a microtransit system known as Ride TFT (Twin Falls Transit). It was initially launched as a pilot program and was to run for two years. However, in late January 2024, it was found to have quickly become a success in the community. While officials expected around 2,000 riders per month, in its first month, it had a ridership of 3,200. It has consistently gone up since, nearly tripling initial projections during the month of December 2023. Typical fare is $3.00 a ride within the city of Twin Falls boundary.

== Geography ==
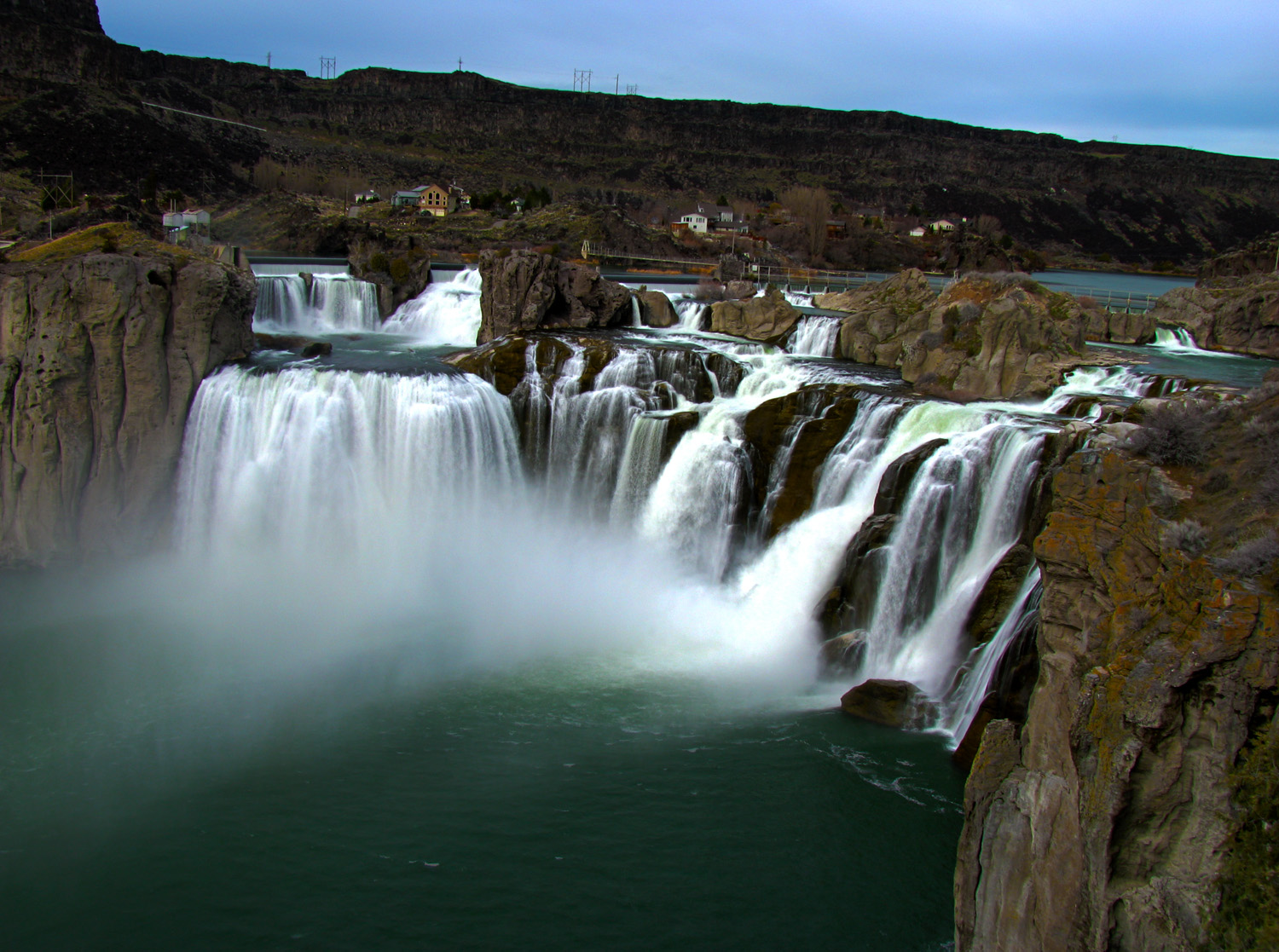
Shoshone Falls along Snake River

According to the United States Census Bureau, the city has a total area of 19.987 square miles (51.77 km^{2}), of which 19.870 square miles (51.46 km^{2}) is land and 0.117 square miles (0.30 km^{2}) (0.59%) is water.

The Snake River Canyon forms the city's northern limits, separating it from Jerome County. Three waterfalls are in the immediate area. Shoshone Falls is located about 5 mi (8.0 km) east of Twin Falls city. Pillar Falls is located roughly 1 1/2 mi (2 1/2 km) upstream from the Perrine Bridge, while Twin Falls, the city's namesake, is located upstream of Shoshone Falls.

Shoshone Falls stands at 213 ft (65 m), which is 46 ft (14 m) higher than Niagara Falls.

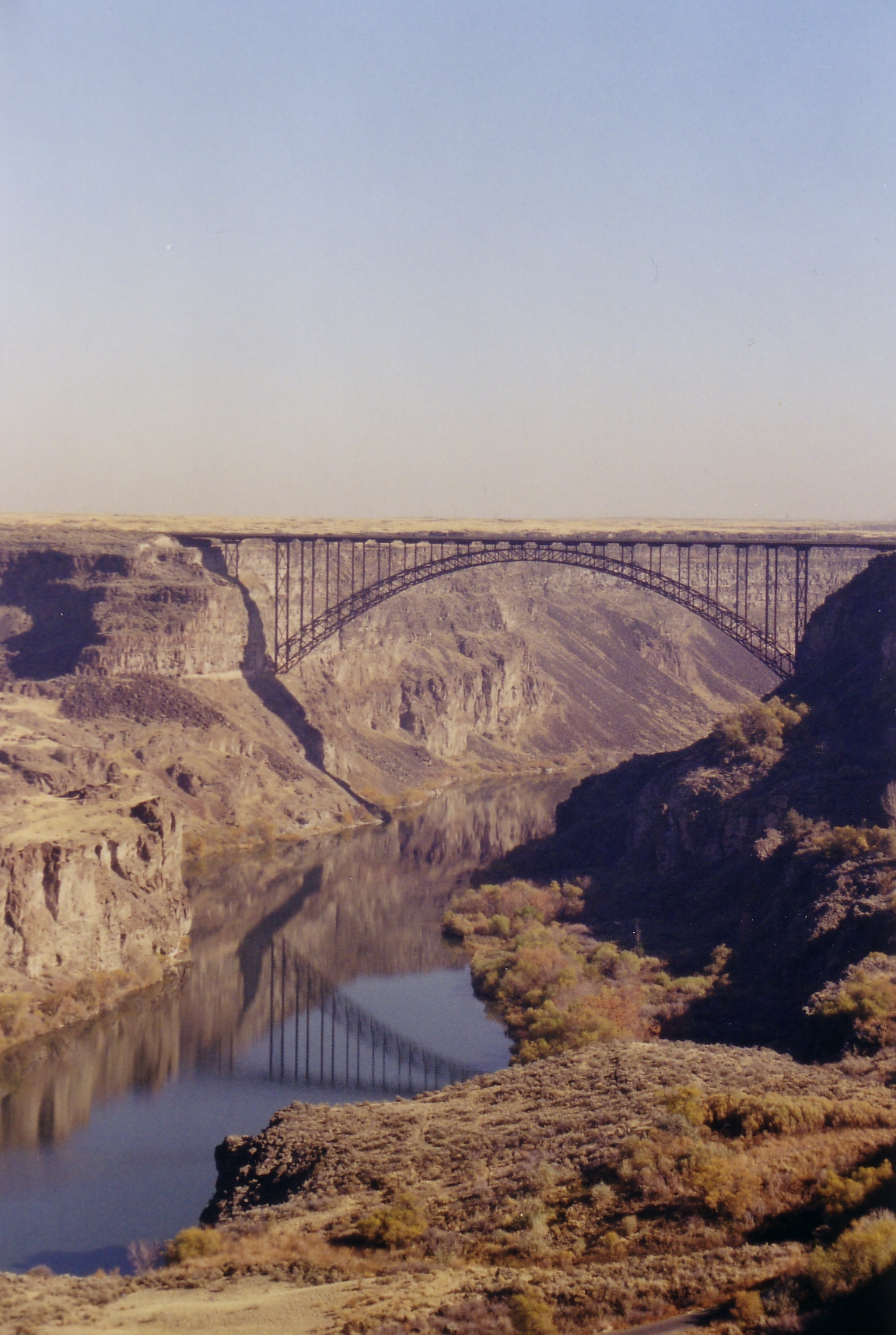
View of the Perrine Bridge from the south side of the canyon

The Perrine Bridge, which spans the Snake River Canyon immediately north of the city, is one of only a handful of artificial structures worldwide where BASE jumping is legal. In September 2005, Miles Daisher of Twin Falls set a BASE-jumping world record by jumping off Perrine Bridge 57 times in a 24-hour period. In July 2006, Dan Schilling jumped off the bridge 201 times in 21 hours to raise money for charity. Unlike Daisher, Schilling was hoisted to the top of the bridge by a crane after every jump.

== Climate ==
Twin Falls experiences a semiarid climate (Köppen climate classification BSk).

Highs reach 90 °F (32 °C) on average 22.7 days per year, but very rarely exceed 100 °F (38 °C). Winter snowfall averages 24.2 inches (61.5 cm) per year, though much heavier amounts have fallen. In Twin Falls proper, an average snowfall uncommonly exceeds 6 inches of snow. Summer and autumn are very dry in Twin Falls, with less than 1 in (2.5 cm) of precipitation falling each month between June and October. Fast moving, intense electrical storms common in the deserts of the southwestern U.S. are uncommon here.

Climate data for Twin Falls, Idaho, 1991–2020 normals, extremes 1963–2012
Month	Jan	Feb	Mar	Apr	May	Jun	Jul	Aug	Sep	Oct	Nov	Dec	Year
Record high °F (°C)	58 (14)	68 (20)	79 (26)	88 (31)	100 (38)	100 (38)	104 (40)	100 (38)	96 (36)	89 (32)	76 (24)	65 (18)	104 (40)
Mean maximum °F (°C)	49.7 (9.8)	56.1 (13.4)	68.3 (20.2)	78.7 (25.9)	85.5 (29.7)	91.8 (33.2)	96.5 (35.8)	95.6 (35.3)	89.8 (32.1)	80.5 (26.9)	65.4 (18.6)	53.3 (11.8)	97.3 (36.3)
Mean daily maximum °F (°C)	36.9 (2.7)	42.2 (5.7)	52.6 (11.4)	59.1 (15.1)	68.0 (20.0)	77.0 (25.0)	86.8 (30.4)	85.5 (29.7)	75.9 (24.4)	62.7 (17.1)	48.3 (9.1)	37.1 (2.8)	61.0 (16.1)
Daily mean °F (°C)	29.3 (−1.5)	33.5 (0.8)	41.6 (5.3)	47.0 (8.3)	55.4 (13.0)	63.0 (17.2)	70.8 (21.6)	69.2 (20.7)	60.4 (15.8)	49.1 (9.5)	37.9 (3.3)	29.2 (−1.6)	48.9 (9.4)
Mean daily minimum °F (°C)	21.8 (−5.7)	24.8 (−4.0)	30.7 (−0.7)	34.8 (1.6)	42.7 (5.9)	49.0 (9.4)	54.8 (12.7)	52.9 (11.6)	44.9 (7.2)	35.5 (1.9)	27.4 (−2.6)	21.4 (−5.9)	36.7 (2.6)
Mean minimum °F (°C)	2.5 (−16.4)	6.6 (−14.1)	18.1 (−7.7)	22.9 (−5.1)	28.7 (−1.8)	36.4 (2.4)	43.6 (6.4)	41.4 (5.2)	31.3 (−0.4)	22.0 (−5.6)	11.1 (−11.6)	2.0 (−16.7)	−3.9 (−19.9)
Record low °F (°C)	−14 (−26)	−17 (−27)	3 (−16)	14 (−10)	22 (−6)	28 (−2)	33 (1)	32 (0)	24 (−4)	9 (−13)	−4 (−20)	−23 (−31)	−23 (−31)
Average precipitation inches (mm)	1.20 (30)	0.81 (21)	1.11 (28)	1.16 (29)	1.44 (37)	0.75 (19)	0.24 (6.1)	0.35 (8.9)	0.49 (12)	0.84 (21)	0.97 (25)	1.44 (37)	10.80 (274)
Average snowfall inches (cm)	7.8 (20)	5.5 (14)	1.9 (4.8)	0.5 (1.3)	0.0 (0.0)	0.0 (0.0)	0.0 (0.0)	0.0 (0.0)	0.0 (0.0)	0.5 (1.3)	2.0 (5.1)	6.0 (15)	24.2 (61.5)
Average precipitation days (≥ 0.01 in)	10.6	8.7	9.3	10.1	8.5	6.5	2.8	2.7	2.9	5.4	7.7	10.3	85.5
Average snowy days (≥ 0.1 in)	5.7	3.9	1.8	0.8	0.0	0.0	0.0	0.0	0.0	0.4	2.1	5.0	19.7
Source 1: NOAA
Source 2: National Weather Service (mean maxima/minima 1981–2010)

== Demographics ==
Historical population
Census	Pop.	Note	%±
1910	5,258		—
1920	8,324		58.3%
1930	8,787		5.6%
1940	11,851		34.9%
1950	17,600		48.5%
1960	20,126		14.4%
1970	21,914		8.9%
1980	26,209		19.6%
1990	27,591		5.3%
2000	34,469		24.9%
2010	44,125		28.0%
2020	51,807		17.4%
2024 (est.)	55,589		7.3%
U.S. Decennial Census; 2020 Census

=== Racial and ethnic composition ===
Twin Falls, Idaho – racial and ethnic composition Note: the US Census treats Hispanic/Latino as an ethnic category. This table excludes Latinos from the racial categories and assigns them to a separate category. Hispanics/Latinos may be of any race.
Race / ethnicity (NH = non-Hispanic)	Pop. 1990	Pop. 2000	Pop. 2010	Pop. 2020	% 1990	% 2000	% 2010	% 2020
White alone (NH)	25,071	30,199	36,248	37,998	90.87%	87.61%	82.15%	73.35%
Black or African American alone (NH)	44	64	257	901	0.16%	0.19%	0.58%	1.74%
Native American or Alaska Native alone (NH)	162	214	263	316	0.59%	0.62%	0.60%	0.61%
Asian alone (NH)	440	369	770	1,257	1.59%	1.07%	1.75%	2.43%
Pacific Islander alone (NH)	—	39	56	180	—	0.11%	0.13%	0.35%
Other race alone (NH)	11	21	46	145	0.04%	0.06%	0.10%	0.28%
Mixed race or multiracial (NH)	—	497	720	2,035	—	1.44%	1.63%	3.93%
Hispanic or Latino (any race)	1,863	3,066	5,765	8,975	6.75%	8.89%	13.07%	17.32%
Total	27,591	34,469	44,125	51,807	100.00%	100.00%	100.00%	100.00%

=== 2020 census ===
As of the 2020 census, there were 51,807 people residing in the city. The population density was 2,676.67 inhabitants per square mile (1,033.5/km^{2}), and there were 20,439 housing units at an average density of 1,056.01 per square mile (407.7/km^{2}).

The census counted 19,300 households and 12,538 families; 33.6% had children under the age of 18, 46.1% were married-couple households, 18.8% had a male householder with no spouse or partner present, and 26.8% had a female householder with no spouse or partner present. About 27.7% of all households were made up of individuals, and 11.1% had someone living alone who was 65 years of age or older.

The median age was 34.2 years. 26.9% of residents were under the age of 18 and 15.6% were 65 years of age or older. For every 100 females there were 96.1 males, and for every 100 females age 18 and over there were 93.0 males age 18 and over.

99.9% of residents lived in urban areas, while 0.1% lived in rural areas.

The housing stock had a 5.6% vacancy rate, including a homeowner vacancy rate of 1.4% and a rental vacancy rate of 6.1%.

Racial composition as of the 2020 census
Race	Number	Percent
White	40,468	78.1%
Black or African American	928	1.8%
American Indian and Alaska Native	575	1.1%
Asian	1,279	2.5%
Native Hawaiian and Other Pacific Islander	189	0.4%
Some other race	3,551	6.9%
Two or more races	4,817	9.3%
Hispanic or Latino (of any race)	8,975	17.3%

=== 2010 census ===
As of the 2010 census, there were 44,125 people, 16,744 households, and 11,011 families residing in the city. The population density was 2,437.8 inhabitants per square mile (941.2/km^{2}). There were 18,033 housing units at an average density of 996.3 per square mile (384.7/km^{2}). The racial makeup of the city was 88.54% White, 0.65% African American, 0.84% Native American, 1.79% Asian, 0.13% Pacific Islander, 5.49% from some other races and 2.56% from two or more races. Hispanic or Latino people of any race were 13.07% of the population.

There were 16,744 households, 35.1% had children under 18 living with them, 48.3% were married couples living together, 12.2% had a female householder with no husband present, 5.2% had a male householder with no wife present, and 34.2% were not families. About 26.6% of all households were made up of individuals, and 10.9% had someone living alone who was 65 or older. The average household size was 2.58. and the average family size was 3.13.

The median age in the city was 31.9 years; 27% of residents were under 18; 11.7% were between 18 and 24; 26.5% were from 25 to 44; 21.4% were from 45 to 64; and 13.4% were 65 or older. The gender makeup of the city was 48.7% male and 51.3% female.

=== Recent estimates ===
According to realtor website Zillow, the average price of a home as of October 30, 2025, in Twin Falls is $358,745.

As of the 2023 American Community Survey, there are 20,239 estimated households in Twin Falls with an average of 2.57 persons per household. The city has a median household income of $60,760. Approximately 10.8% of the city's population lives at or below the poverty line. Twin Falls has an estimated 62.1% employment rate, with 22.7% of the population holding a bachelor's degree or higher and 89.6% holding a high school diploma. There were 21,268 housing units at an average density of 1,070.36 per square mile (413.3/km^{2}).

The top five reported languages (people were allowed to report up to two languages, thus the figures will generally add to more than 100%) were English (86.0%), Spanish (9.1%), Indo-European (2.8%), Asian and Pacific Islander (1.1%), and Other (1.0%).

== Notable people ==
- Bruce Bastian (born 1948), computer programmer and co-founder of the WordPerfect Software Company
- Gary L. Bennett (born 1940), former NASA scientist and engineer and science-fiction writer
- Jim Boatwright (1951–2013), basketball player
- Dorothy Custer (1911–2015), comedian, harmonicist, and centenarian
- W. Mark Felt (1913–2008), informant in the Watergate scandal known as Deep Throat
- Christina Hendricks (born 1975), actress, grew up in Twin Falls
- Damon Jones (born 1994), professional baseball pitcher
- Chuck LaMar (born c. 1956), first general manager of the Tampa Bay Devil Rays
- William J. Lanting (1918–1998), Idaho State Representative (1959–1975) and Speaker of Idaho House (1969–1975)
- Craig Hart Neilsen (1941–2006), founder of the Craig H. Neilsen Foundation to fund scientific research for spinal cord injuries
- Volara Romanza Nelson (1892–1921), first Idaho woman to hold a pilot's license
- Hannah Newhouse (born 1997), racing driver
- Dallin H. Oaks (born 1932), jurist and senior leader of the LDS Church
- Melvin Schwartz (1932–2006), Nobel Prize-winning experimental physicist and co-discoverer of the muon neutrino
- Addison T. Smith (1862–1956), U.S. Congressman (1913–1933); namesake of Addison Avenue
- Lyda Southard (1892–1958), serial killer

Notable musicians who spent parts of their childhood in the Twin Falls area include Gary Puckett, Paul Durham of Black Lab, Nikki Sixx of Mötley Crüe, and Doug Martsch of Built to Spill.
