= Zach Penrod =

American baseball player (born 1997)

Free agent
- Pitcher
- Born: June 16, 1997 (age 29); Nampa, Idaho, U.S.
- Bats: Left Throws: Left

MLB debut
- September 14, 2024, for the Boston Red Sox

MLB statistics (through 2024 season)
- Win–loss record: 0–0
- Earned run average: 2.25
- Strikeouts: 3
- Stats at Baseball Reference

Teams
- Boston Red Sox (2024)

Zach Penrod (born June 16, 1997) is an American professional baseball pitcher who is a free agent. He has previously played in Major League Baseball (MLB) for the Boston Red Sox.

== Career ==
=== Amateur career ===
Penrod attended Columbia High School in Nampa, Idaho. He was a first-team all-conference baseball player his junior and senior seasons. He then attended Corban University. In 2016, he did not pitch, only playing as an outfielder. In 2017, he returned to the mound, with a 2.03 ERA in 9 relief appearances. Penrod then transferred to Northwest Nazarene University. In 2018, he had a 1.89 ERA in 19 innings pitched for the Nighthawks. As a batter, he hit .369 with 5 home runs in 46 games. He was named to the second-team All-Great Northwest Athletic Conference as an outfielder.

=== Texas Rangers ===
On August 2, 2018, Penrod signed with the Texas Rangers as an undrafted free agent, after he was not selected in the 2018 MLB draft. He made his professional debut with the rookie-level Arizona League Rangers, recording a 6.17 ERA with 11 strikeouts over four games. On April 1, 2019, he underwent Tommy John surgery and missed the whole 2019 season while recovering.

The COVID-19 pandemic led to the cancellation of the 2020 minor league season, and Penrod was released by the Rangers organization on June 1, 2020.

=== Pioneer Baseball League ===
On May 27, 2021, Penrod signed with the Boise Hawks of the independent Pioneer League. In his first competitive baseball since 2018, he started 14 games for Boise, with a 3–4 record, 5.66 ERA, and 85 strikeouts across 68 1/3 innings of work.

On August 23, 2022, Penrod, Byron Smith, and Juan Teixiera were traded to the Billings Mustangs. He pitched in 13 games (four starts) in 2022, with a 1–3 record and 7.40 ERA with 20 strikeouts and across 20 2/3 innings. On December 12, 2022, Penrod signed with the Missoula PaddleHeads. He made 13 appearances (10 starts) for Missoula in 2023, posting a 4–1 record and 2.98 ERA with 65 strikeouts over 54 1/3 innings pitched.

=== Boston Red Sox ===
On August 16, 2023, Penrod signed a minor league contract with the Boston Red Sox. He made four starts for the High-A Greenville Drive down the stretch, posting a 2–1 record and 2.18 ERA with 20 strikeouts over 20 2/3 innings. He began the 2024 campaign with the Double-A Portland Sea Dogs before being promoted to the Triple-A Worcester Red Sox in late May. In 22 games (12 starts) between the two affiliates, he had an 8–2 record and 4.16 ERA with 93 strikeouts across 62 2/3 innings pitched.

On September 14, Penrod was selected to the 40-man roster and promoted to the major leagues for the first time. He made his MLB debut the same day, pitching in relief at Yankee Stadium and striking out the first two batters he faced (Austin Wells and Jazz Chisholm Jr.). In seven games with Boston, he had no decisions but earned two holds, with a 2.25 ERA, three strikeouts and four walks in four innings.

On March 27, 2025, Penrod was placed on the 60-day injured list a left elbow sprain. He was activated on May 27, and optioned to Triple-A Worcester. In five appearances (two starts) for Worcester, he recorded a 3.38 ERA with six strikeouts across 5 1/3 innings pitched. On June 15, Penrod was designated for assignment by Boston.

=== Los Angeles Dodgers ===
On June 20, 2025, the Los Angeles Dodgers acquired Penrod from the Red Sox in exchange for cash considerations. Penrod was designated for assignment on August 2. The next day, after clearing waivers, he was sent outright to the minor leagues. Penrod made 19 appearances for the Triple-A Oklahoma City Comets, posting a 2-0 record and 8.65 ERA with 23 strikeouts over 26 innings of work. He elected free agency following the season on November 6.

=== Washington Nationals ===
On January 19, 2026, Penrod signed a minor league contract with the Washington Nationals. He made 36 appearances (including nine starts) for the Triple–A Rochester Red Wings, posting a 1–4 record and 4.27 ERA with 41 strikeouts and four saves across 46 1/3 innings pitched. Penrod was released by the Nationals organization on August 4.

== Personal life ==
Penrod has three brothers, Skyler, Trevor, and JT. Their parents are Jon and Tracy Penrod.
