= Adam Selzer =

American author

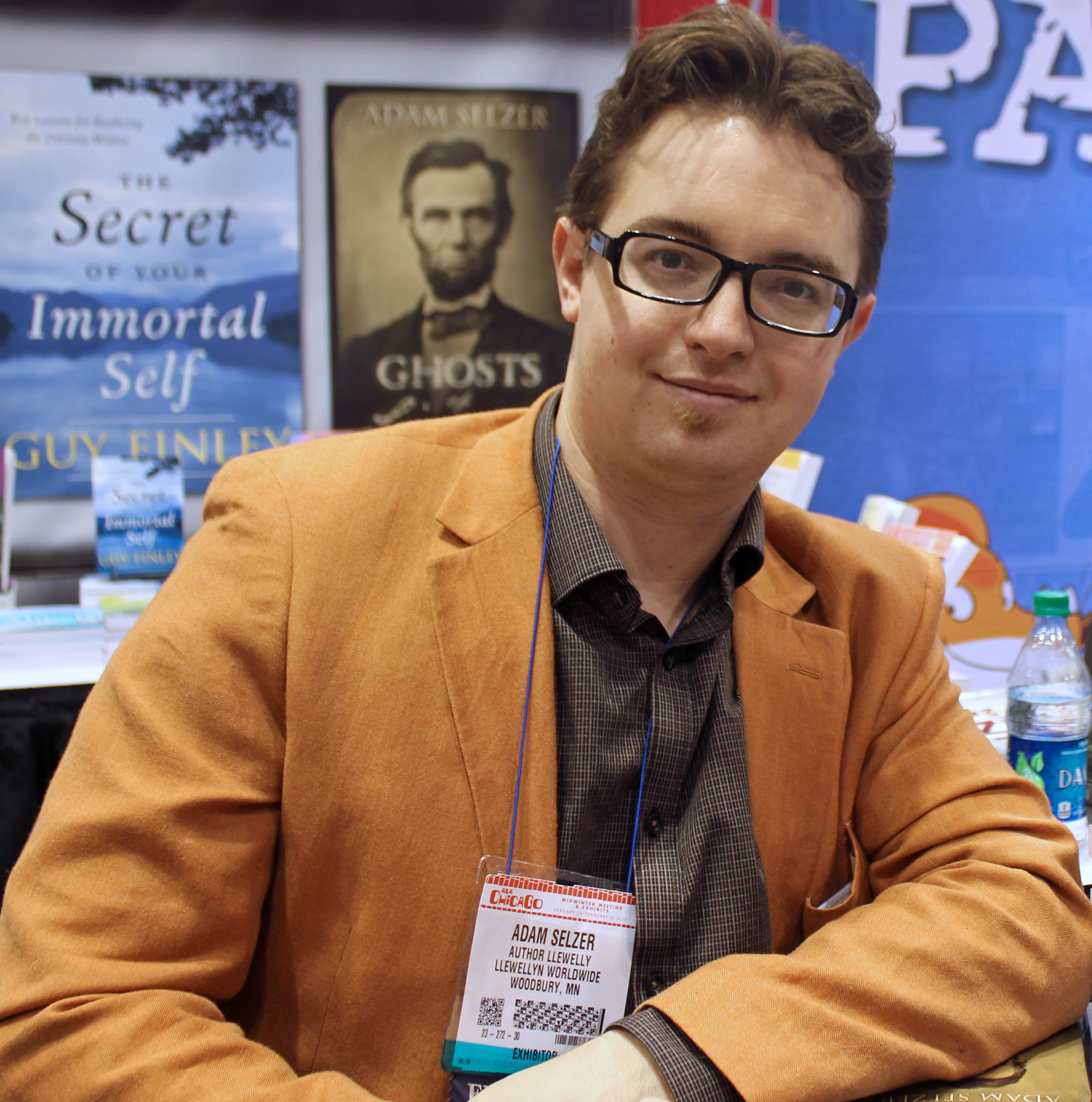
- Selzer in 2015
- Born: July 13, 1980 (age 46); Des Moines, Iowa, United States
- Occupation: Author

Adam Selzer (born July 13, 1980) is an American author, originally of young adult and middle grade novels, though his work after 2011 has primarily been adult nonfiction.

== Career ==
Adam Selzer's first novel was How To Get Suspended and Influence People, published in 2007 by Random House. In 2009, it made national news after attempts were made to have it removed from the Nampa Public Library in Idaho; it was included in the American Library Association's Banned Books Week packet in 2010.

His 2008 novel for younger readers, I Put a Spell On You: From the Files of Chrissie Woodward, Spelling Bee Detective, was nominated for a Great Lakes Book Award. It has been used as a teaching book for classroom reading.

A 2009 short film Selzer co-wrote, At Last, Okemah!, won an audience choice award at the 2009 Chicago Reel Shorts Film Fest as well as an Audience Award for Best Film at the 2011 Bare Bones International Film Festival.

His first nonfiction book for Random House was The Smart Aleck's Guide to American History, published in 2009. It was a Junior Library Guild selection. Critics have compared the humor to that of The Daily Show and Mark Twain. It was nominated for a YALSA Award for Excellence in Nonfiction in 2011.

In 2009, Selzer's editor at Random House suggested he write a book based on a song Selzer had written in 2000. The resulting book, I Kissed a Zombie and I Liked It, was released in January 2010. A follow-up (to both that book and I Put a Spell On You) entitled Extraordinary* was released by Delacorte Books in 2011, the same day as Selzer published Sparks with Flux Books under the name SJ Adams. In 2013, Sparks was named a Stonewall Honor Book, as well as being placed on the American Library Association Rainbow Book List.

In addition to his writing, Selzer works as a historian, tour guide, and ghost investigator in Chicago. In 2009, his first adult nonfiction title with a major publisher, Your Neighborhood Gives Me the Creeps, told stories of his life and work as a ghost tour guide and as a skeptic in the ghost-hunting field. He previously worked for Weird Chicago Tours and Chicago Hauntings before founding his own tour company AdamChicago Tours.

In 2017, he released the first comprehensive biography of Chicago serial killer H. H. Holmes.

== List of works ==
=== Novels ===
- How to Get Suspended and Influence People. Delacorte Press. 2007. ISBN 978-0-385-73369-4.
- Pirates of the Retail Wasteland. Random House Children's Books. 2008. ISBN 978-0-385-73482-0.
- I Put a Spell On You: From the Files of Chrissie Woodward, Spelling Bee Detective. Delacorte Press. 2008. ISBN 978-0-385-73504-9.
- Andrew North Blows up the World. Random House Children's Books. 2009. ISBN 978-0-375-89375-9.
- I Kissed a Zombie, and I Liked It. Random House Children's Books. 2010. ISBN 978-0-385-73503-2.
- Extraordinary: The True Story of My Fairy Godparent, Who Almost Killed Me, and Certainly Never Made Me a Princess. Delacorte Press. 2011. ISBN 978-0-385-73649-7.
- Sparks. As S.J. Adams. Flux. 2011. ISBN 978-0-738-73002-8.
- Play Me Backwards. Simon & Schuster Books For Young Readers. 2014. ISBN 978-1-4814-0102-9.
- Just Kill Me. Simon & Schuster BFYR. 2016. ISBN 978-1-4814-3494-2.

=== Nonfiction ===
- Weird Chicago. With Troy Taylor and Ken Melvoin-Berg. Whitechapel Productions. 2008. ISBN 978-1-89252-359-4.
- Fatal Drop: True Tales of the Chicago Gallows. As William Griffith. Whitechapel Productions. 2008. ISBN 978-1-89252-362-4.
- The Smart Aleck's Guide to American History. Delacorte Press. 2009. ISBN 978-0-385-73650-3.
- Your Neighborhood Gives Me the Creeps: True Tales of an Accidental Ghost Hunter. Llewellyn Publications. 2009. ISBN 978-0-73871-557-5.
- Speaking Ill of the Dead: Jerks in Chicago h=History. Globe Pequot Press. 2012. ISBN 978-0-7627-7291-9.
- The Ghosts of Chicago: The Windy City's Most Famous Haunts. Llewellyn Publications. 2013. ISBN 978-0-7387-3611-2.
- Ghosts of Lincoln: Discovering His Paranormal Legacy. Llewellyn Worldwide. 2015. ISBN 978-0-7387-4514-5.
- Flickering Empire: How Chicago Invented the U.S. Film Industry. With Michael Glover Smith. Columbia University Press. 2015. ISBN 978-0-231-17448-0.
- Mysterious Chicago: History at Its Coolest. Skyhorse Publishing. 2016. ISBN 978-1-5107-1342-0.
- H. H. Holmes: The True History of the White City Devil. Skyhorse Publishing. 2017. ISBN 978-1-5107-1346-8.
- Graceland Cemetery: Chicago Stories, Symbols, and Secrets. University of Illinois Press. 2022. ISBN 978-0-252-05342-9.
