= Vallivue School District =

School district in Idaho, United States

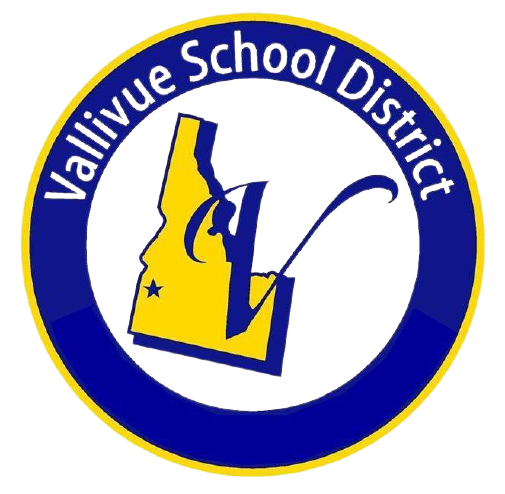

Address
- 5207 S Montana Ave Caldwell, Idaho, 83607; United States

District information
- Type: Public
- Grades: Pre-K through 12
- Established: June 1957
- Superintendent: Lisa Boyd
- School board: 5 members
- Governing agency: Board of Trustees
- Accreditation: Northwest Accreditation Commission
- Schools: Elementary 9, Middle 3, High 2
- Budget: $36 million

Students and staff
- Students: 13,264
- Teachers: 500
- Staff: 300
- Student–teacher ratio: 18:1
- Athletic conference: Southern Idaho Conference (5A), IHSAA
- District mascot: falcon
- Colors: Black and Gold

Other information
- Release time: Selected instruction
- State test: ISAT
- Schedule: M-F except state holidays
- Website: www.vallivue.org

Vallivue School District is a school district in Idaho. It is mostly based in Caldwell and Nampa, with locations in Canyon County. The Vallivue boundaries go as far as the Snake River. The Vallivue district boundaries border Middleton School District to the north, Nampa School District to the south, Caldwell School District to the northwest, and West Ada School District to the east.

The district includes portions of Caldwell and Nampa as well as Greenleaf and a small portion of Middleton.

== History ==
The Vallivue School District had its early beginnings as thirteen rural schoolhouses scattered throughout the countryside in Canyon County. These schoolhouses housed students from kindergarten through 8th grade. In 1961, the school boards came together to form Vallivue School District. The main building was the high school, and the 8th grade building was the middle school. Many teachers that graduated from Vallivue High School are teachers at the Vallivue Middle School.

== List of schools ==
=== Elementary schools ===
- Birch Elementary (Birch)
- Desert Springs Elementary (Desert)
- Central Canyon Elementary (Central)
- East Canyon Elementary (East)
- Lakevue Elementary (Lakevue)
- West Canyon Elementary (West)
- Skyway Elementary (Skyway)
- Warhawk Elementary (2025)
- Falcon Ridge Elementary (2025)

=== Middle schools ===
- Sage Valley Middle School (Sage)
- Vallivue Middle School (VMS)
- Summitvue Middle School (Summitvue)

=== High schools ===
- Vallivue High School
- Vallivue Academy (alternative high school)
- Ridgevue High School

Vallivue also has one charter school, Thomas Jefferson Charter School, in their district. Vallivue also has a virtual school, serving K-12. All of the schools are located in Caldwell except for Ridgevue High School, Sage Valley Middle School, Birch Elementary, Desert Springs Elementary, and East Canyon Elementary which are located in Nampa. The district office is in Caldwell as well.
