= Skyview High School (Idaho) =

Coordinates: 43.545°N 116.556°W

- 1303 East Greenhurst Rd. Nampa, Idaho; U.S.

Information
- Type: Public
- Established: 30 years ago
- School district: Nampa S.D. (#131)
- Principal: Will Barber
- Staff: 65.84 (FTE)
- Grades: 9–12
- Enrollment: 1,127 (2023–2024)
- Student to teacher ratio: 17.12
- Colors: Navy, Silver & White
- Athletics: IHSAA Class 5A
- Athletics conference: Southern Idaho (4A) (SIC)
- Mascot: Hawk
- Rivals: Nampa, Columbia, Bishop Kelly High School
- Feeder schools: South Middle School, Lonestar Middle School
- Elevation: 2,510 ft (770 m) AMSL
- Website: Skyview High School

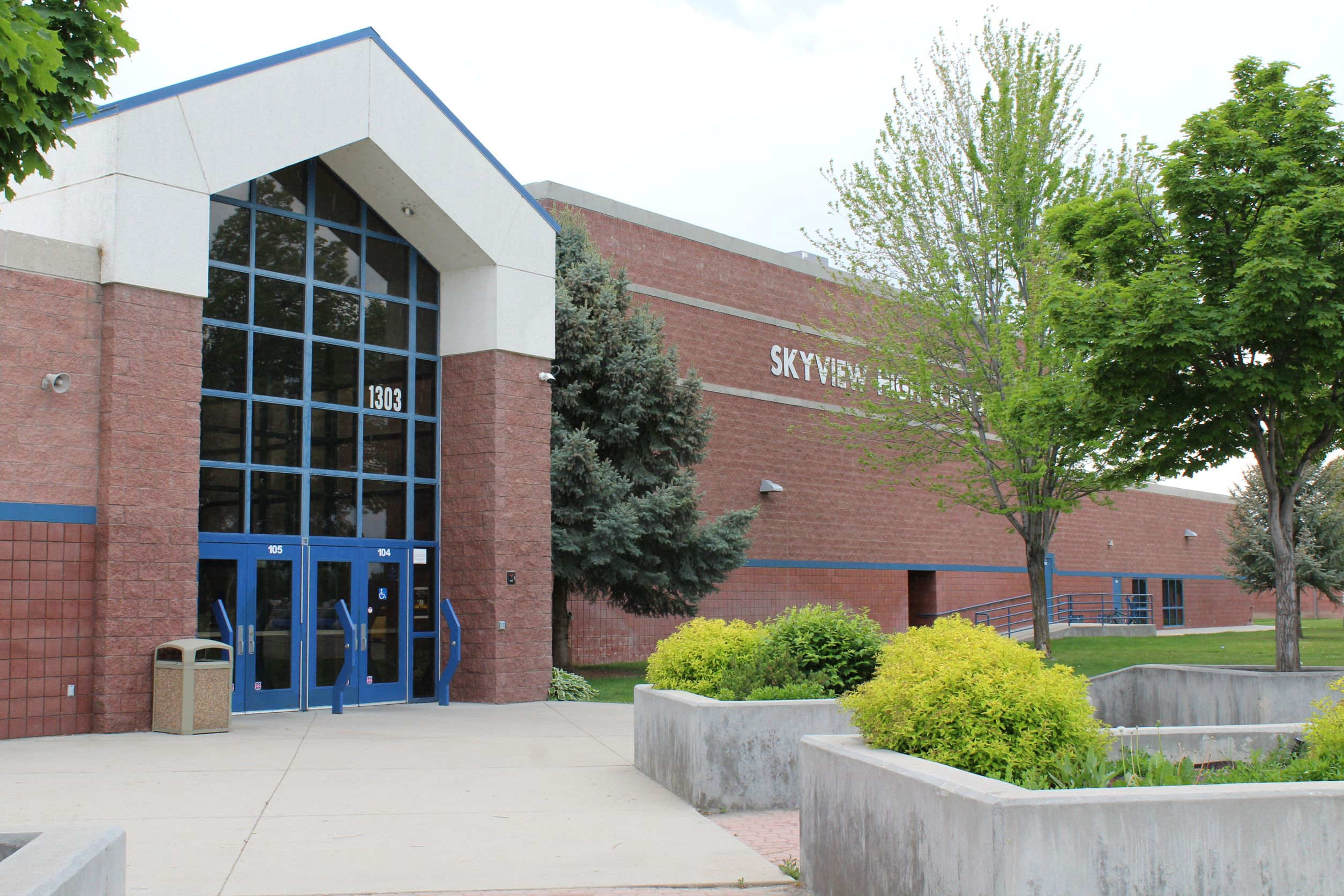
Entry area to Skyview High School located on 1303 E Greenhurst Rd, Nampa, ID 83686 with a partial view of the school name sign.

Skyview High School is a four-year public secondary school in Nampa, Idaho. Opened in 1996, it is the second of three traditional high schools operated by the Nampa School District #131. Skyview is on a block schedule, with students taking 4 classes on A day and 4 classes on B day.

The building was designed for 1,200 students with a 422-seat theater, and football, soccer, tennis, and softball fields.

In 2013, Skyview became the first school in the United States to use WiFi enabled real-time location system badges for teachers and staff for the purposes of safety.

== Academics ==
Skyview serves grades 9 - 12.

In 2022–2023, courses are offered in the following fields: Art (performing and visual), Communications, Foreign Languages, English Language Arts, Mathematics, Music, English Language Learning, Music, Health and Wellness, Science, Special Education, and Social Science.

27 courses are listed as either Advanced Placement or Dual Credit.

- Four-year graduation rate: 83.5%.
- Five-year graduation rate: 90.4%.
- English Language Arts/Literacy proficiency rate by students: 48.3% (as measured by Idaho Standards Achievement Test - ISAT).
- Mathematics proficiency rate by students: 27.1% (as measured by Idaho Standards Achievement Test - ISAT).

== Activities ==
Skyview competes in non-athletic activities as a medium school in IHSAA.

=== State titles ===
- Debate: 2022
- Speech: 2019, 2022

== Athletics ==
Skyview competes in athletics in IHSAA Class 4A and Class 5A, the highest classification in the state, and is a member of the Southern Idaho Conference (5A) (SIC). Rivals are the other two high schools in the district, Nampa and Columbia

=== State titles ===
==== Boys ====
- Basketball (3): (4A) 2005, 2006, 2009 (undefeated)
- Soccer (3): fall (4A) 2003, 2014, 2016, (introduced in 2000)
- Track and Field (1): (4A) 2014
- Wrestling (1): (4A) 2005

==== Girls ====
- Basketball (1): (4A) 2014
- Dance (6) 2013, 2014, 2015, 2016, 2017, 2018
- Golf (1): (4A) 2002
- Softball (1): (4A) 2012
- Tennis (1): (4A) 2013
- Volleyball (4): fall (4A) 2016, 2017; (5A) 2020, 2021, 2022, 2023

== Student Demographics ==
In Spring 2026, Skyview's enrollment was 1,107.

=== Race or ethnicity ===
- Asian: 0.7%
- Black/African American: 1.1%
- Hispanic or Latino: 34.1%
- Native American or Alaskan Native: 0.5%
- Native Hawaiian or Pacific Islander: 0.1%
- Multiracial: 4.5%
- White: 59.0%

=== Enrollment by Student Groups ===
- Students from Low Income Families: 38.0%
- Students Learning English: 10.0%
- Students with Disabilities: 11.0%
- Students in Foster Care: <1.0%
- Students who are Homeless: 3.0%
- Students from Migrant Families: 5.0%
- Students from Military Families: 4.0%
