= George L. Bartlett =

United States Marine Corps general (1924–2024)

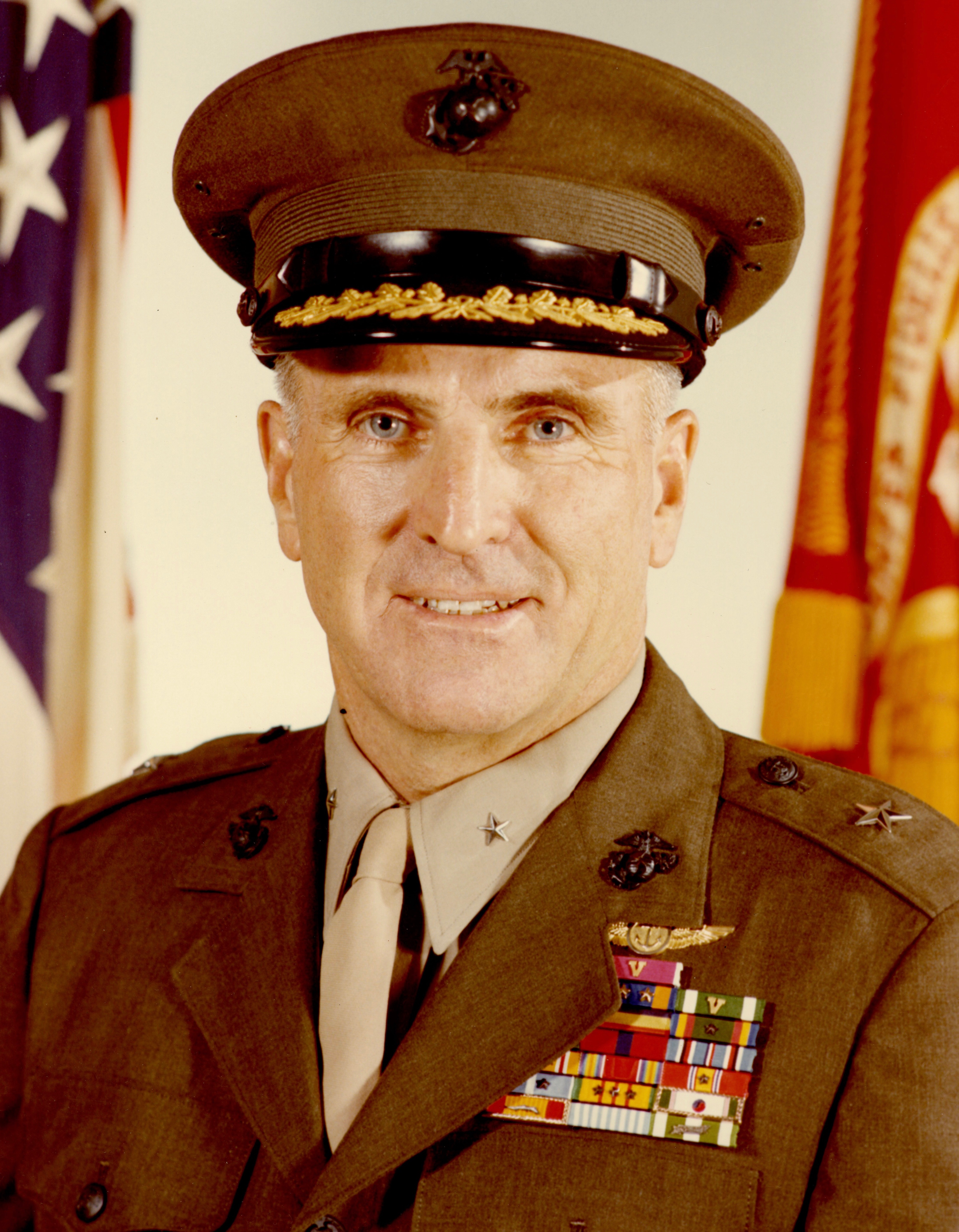
- Bartlett in 1975
- Born: October 13, 1924; Nampa, Idaho, U.S.
- Died: December 19, 2024 (aged 100)
- Burial place: Arlington National Cemetery
- Military career
- Allegiance: United States
- Branch: United States Marine Corps
- Service years: 1943–1946; 1950–1977
- Rank: Brigadier general
- Commands: Facilities and Services Division, Headquarters Marine Corps
- Conflicts: World War II; Solomon Islands campaign; New Britain campaign; Korean War; Vietnam War; Operation Starlite
- Awards: Legion of Merit; Air Medal (3); Navy Commendation Medal; Joint Service Commendation Medal
- Other work: Executive director, Marine Corps Association

George Lewis Bartlett (October 13, 1924 – December 19, 2024) was a United States Marine Corps officer who reached the rank of brigadier general. He enlisted during World War II, later served as an air controller during the Korean War, and completed two tours in the Vietnam War. His decorations included the Legion of Merit with Combat "V" and three Air Medals. After retiring from the Marine Corps in 1977, Bartlett led the Marine Corps Association from 1979 to 1989.

== Early life and World War II ==
Bartlett was born in Nampa, Idaho, and grew up in Mackay. He attended Wasatch Academy in Mount Pleasant, Utah, graduating in 1942. After one semester at Oregon State University, he enlisted in the Marine Corps on February 15, 1943.

Following recruit training in San Diego, Bartlett studied aviation mechanics at Naval Air Station Jacksonville and trained as a navigator-bombardier at Marine Corps Air Station Cherry Point. He joined Marine Bomber Squadron 443 in 1944 and deployed to the South Pacific. Flying aboard B-25 Mitchell aircraft from Green Island, he served first as a nose gunner and then as a navigator-bombardier. His missions included attacks on Japanese positions at Rabaul, New Ireland, and New Britain, as well as searches for downed Allied crews.

Bartlett completed 75 combat missions, attained the enlisted rank of staff sergeant, and received three Air Medals and the Marine Corps Good Conduct Medal. He was released from active duty in February 1946.

== Education and Korean War service ==
After the war, Bartlett attended Case Western Reserve University before transferring to the University of Oregon, where he studied architecture and played football. He remained in the Marine Corps Reserve and returned to active duty in November 1950. In May 1951, he was commissioned as a second lieutenant and completed his Bachelor of Science degree.

After training at The Basic School and the Air Controller School, Bartlett became an air-defense control officer. He deployed to Korea in July 1952 as a senior air controller with Marine Ground Control Intercept Squadron 1, part of the 1st Marine Aircraft Wing. He also served with a United States Air Force aircraft-warning detachment on Cho Do, off the west coast of Korea. He returned to the United States in June 1953.

During subsequent assignments, Bartlett served in personnel, engineering, and command positions. He commanded companies in the 7th Engineer Battalion in California and Okinawa and served on the staff of Marine Corps Schools at Quantico. He completed engineering courses at Fort Belvoir and later earned a master's degree from George Washington University.

== Vietnam War and senior commands ==
After completing the Command and Staff College at Quantico in 1964, Bartlett became logistics officer of the 1st Engineer Battalion. In 1965 he joined the 7th Marine Regiment as its plans officer. He helped plan the Marine landing at Chu Lai and Operation Starlite, the first large regimental-sized battle conducted by United States forces in the Vietnam War. He remained in South Vietnam until July 1966 and received the Navy Commendation Medal with Combat "V".

Bartlett next served as inspector-instructor of the 10th Engineer Battalion in Portland, Oregon, and completed the senior course at the Naval War College. He commanded the 13th Engineer Battalion of the 5th Marine Division in 1969. After that division was deactivated, he became plans officer of the 5th Marine Expeditionary Brigade.

He returned to South Vietnam in August 1970 and served on the staff of III Marine Amphibious Force in Da Nang. His assignments included planning the reduction and redeployment of Marine forces. Promoted to colonel in February 1971, he received the Legion of Merit with Combat "V" for this tour. He subsequently served in the logistics division of Allied Forces Southern Europe in Naples, Italy, and received the Joint Service Commendation Medal.

Bartlett was promoted to brigadier general on July 3, 1975. His final assignment was director of the Facilities and Services Division in the Installations and Logistics Department at Headquarters Marine Corps. He retired on June 1, 1977.

== Marine Corps Association ==
After briefly working for the American Gas Association, Bartlett became executive director of the Marine Corps Association in 1979. At the time, the association's staff and supplies were dispersed among several locations at Quantico. Under Bartlett, it ran the Marine Corps Marathon for eight years, expanded distribution of Marine Corps birthday materials to embassy detachments, and promoted its professional publications through direct-mail campaigns.

Bartlett supervised the design and construction of a consolidated headquarters near Marine Corps Base Quantico. The association raised almost $3 million for the project. The building, named Bartlett Hall, was dedicated on November 10, 1986. Bartlett retired from the association at the end of 1988.

In May 2014, at age 89, Bartlett flew aboard Panchito, a restored B-25 similar to those in which he had served during World War II.

== Personal life and death ==
Bartlett had two sons with his first wife, Dorothy Pryor. He later married Donna Bartlett. He died on December 19, 2024, at age 100 and was buried with military honors at Arlington National Cemetery.
