= Ridgevue High School =

Public school in Nampa, Idaho, US

Location
- 18800 Madison Road; Nampa, Idaho; United States
- 43°38′45″N 116°33′44″W

Information
- Type: Public
- Motto: We rise Above the Best!
- Established: 2016; 10 years ago
- School district: Vallivue School District
- Principal: Robert Gwyn
- Staff: 71.82 (FTE)
- Grades: 9–12
- Enrollment: 1,627 (2024–2025)
- Student to teacher ratio: 22.65
- Colors: Burnt orange, black, and white
- Athletics conference: Southern Idaho Conference 6A
- Mascot: The Warhawks
- Accreditation: Northwest Accreditation Commission
- Website: ridgevue.vallivue.org

Ridgevue High School is a four-year public secondary school in Nampa, Idaho, United States. It is one of two traditional high schools in the Vallivue School District. The school draws from two middle and five elementary schools. The boundaries include students from within the cities of both Caldwell and Nampa.

Ridgevue was constructed in 2016 to alleviate overcrowding at Vallivue High School and was the first high school built in the district in 50 years. It has a 65 acre campus with a 250,000 square foot school building housing 68 classrooms along with a 750-seat auditorium, gym and indoor walking track. Externally, there are soccer, baseball and softball fields, with eight tennis courts and a football field and track. The stadium capacity is 3,500. The school opened at the beginning of the 2016-2017 school year with 1,100 students and 81 teachers, and a capacity of 1,800 students and as of the 2024-2025 school year, enrollment was at 1,627. The Ridgevue mascot, the Warhawks, was selected following a community survey and in collaboration with the local Warhawk Air Museum. The mascot was named after the Curtiss P-40 Warhawk, one of the best fighter planes at the beginning of World War II. The P-40 Warhawk motto also lends itself to the school, "Above the Best."

Ridgevue participates in the largest Idaho High School Activities Association (IDHSAA) classification of high schools and competes in the District III Southern Idaho Conference 6A league. Rivalries include in-district Vallivue High School and the cross-town Nampa High School. The school was Academic State Champion in Girls Golf and Girls Volleyball in 2022.
