= Nampa High School =

Coordinates: 43°33′40″N 116°34′30″W

- 203 Lake Lowell Ave. Nampa, Idaho; United States

Information
- Type: Public
- Established: 1901, 1917, 1955 (current)
- School district: Nampa S.D. #131
- Principal: Kasey Burkholder
- Staff: 66.86 (FTE)
- Grades: 9–12
- Enrollment: 1,374 (2023–2024)
- Student to teacher ratio: 20.55
- Colors: Red & Blue
- Athletics: IHSAA Class 5A
- Athletics conference: Southern Idaho (5A) (SIC)
- Mascot: Bulldog
- Rivals: Columbia, Skyview, Caldwell
- Yearbook: The Sage
- Elevation: 2,480 ft (756 m) AMSL
- Website: Nampa High School

Location in the United States
Location in Idaho

Nampa High School is a four-year public secondary school in Nampa, Idaho, the oldest of three high schools operated by the Nampa School District #131. The school colors are red white and blue and the mascot is a bulldog.

== Athletics ==
Nampa competes in athletics in IHSAA Class 4A in the Southern Idaho Conference (4A). NHS traditionally competed with the largest schools in the state in Class 5A (formerly A-1); with the addition of two new high schools, the drop in enrollment caused a change to Class 4A. Nampa moved backed to 5A in the summer of 2014. Nampa currently plays in the 4A classification after dropping back down from 5A.

=== Rivalries ===
Nampa has rivalries with Skyview (1996) and Columbia (2006) within the school district. Its traditional rival is Caldwell to the west and Vallivue to the west all three are also members of the Southern Idaho Conference. In the summer of 2014, Nampa and Columbia moved up to 5A, while Skyview and Caldwell remained in 4A. Prior to the 1960s, Nampa had a strong rivalry with Boise.

=== 1949-50 streak ===
During the 1949-50 school year, Nampa's football, basketball, and baseball teams had a combined winning streak of 55 games. The football team won all nine games and the southern Idaho (Big Six) title, and the Bulldog basketball team, led by captain Wayne Blickenstaff, won all 29 games, concluded with an 18-point victory in the state title game. Both undefeated teams were coached by Babe Brown, formerly at the University of Idaho. The Nampa baseball team won its first 17 games before its only setback of the season, a 4-2 loss to Boise on May 11. In addition, they most recently added a swim team to their array of sports combined with the other high schools in the area.

The Bulldogs were set to host the four-team state baseball tournament in late May, which included Pocatello, Twin Falls, and defending champion Lewiston. The day before it was to start, an early morning automobile accident after a graduation party south of Lewiston killed three members of the LHS Bengals' team, and the tournament in Nampa was canceled.

=== State titles ===
Boys

- Football (1): fall (A-1 Div II, now 4A) 1984
  - (unofficial poll titles - 0) - (poll introduced in 1963, through 1978)
- Cross Country (5): fall 1966, 1967, 1968, 1969, 1978 (introduced in 1964)
- Basketball (1): 1950, and co-title in 1943 (south)
- Wrestling (4): (A-1, now 5A) 1979, 1980, 1988, 1993 (introduced in 1958)
- Baseball (2): (A-1, now 5A) 1974, 1975 (records not kept by IHSAA, state tourney introduced in 1971)
- Track (3): 1951, 1952, 1959
- Marching Band (8): 2003, 2004, 2005, 2006, 2007, 2008, 2016, 2017

Combined

- Tennis (1): 1982 (introduced in 1963, combined until 2008)
- Marching Band (8): 2003, 2004, 2005, 2006, 2007, 2008, 2016, 2017

== Notable alumni ==
- Jeff Agenbroad, state senator
- Justin Eilers, Football player; Retired professional MMA fighter
- Fred Taylor (1901–88), federal district judge, U.S. District Court for Idaho (1954–88)
- Dr. Karl W. Edmark (1924–94), cardiovascular surgeon and inventor of DC defibrillator, founder of Physio-Control
- Mike Kyle, wrestler; current mixed martial artist, once fighting for the UFC
- Rob Morris, former NFL linebacker, Indianapolis Colts (2000–07), class of 1993
- Brandon Silvestry, wrestler
