= Rob Morris (American football) =

American football player (born 1975)

No. 94
- Position: Linebacker

Personal information
- Born: January 18, 1975 (age 51); Nampa, Idaho, U.S.
- Listed height: 6 ft 2 in (1.88 m)
- Listed weight: 243 lb (110 kg)

Career information
- High school: Nampa
- College: BYU
- NFL draft: 2000: 1st round, 28th overall pick

Career history
- Indianapolis Colts (2000–2007)

Awards and highlights
- Super Bowl champion (XLI); First-team All-American (1999); First-team All-Mountain West (1999)

Career NFL statistics
- Total tackles: 482
- Sacks: 7
- Forced fumbles: 2
- Fumble recoveries: 1
- Interceptions: 1
- Defensive touchdowns: 1
- Stats at Pro Football Reference

Robert Samuel Morris (born January 18, 1975) is an American former professional football player who spent his entire eight-year career as a linebacker for the Indianapolis Colts of the National Football League (NFL). He played college football for the BYU Cougars and was selected by the Colts in the first round (28th overall) of the 2000 NFL draft. With the Colts, Morris won Super Bowl XLI against the Chicago Bears.

== Early life ==
Morris was born and raised in Nampa, Idaho, and graduated from Nampa High School in 1993. He was an all-state fullback for the Bulldogs in football and USA Today All-American, and also lettered in basketball and track. Morris was also an Eagle Scout and was inducted into the NHS hall of fame in 2010.

== College career ==
Morris attended Brigham Young University (BYU) in Provo, Utah, and played college football for the Cougars. Morris was a semi-finalist for the Butkus Award and was named as a first-team All-American by the Associated Press, Sporting News, and The Football News. He earned a bachelor's degree in communications from BYU.

== Professional career ==
In 2000, Morris was selected in the first round (28th overall) of the NFL draft by the Indianapolis Colts, where he spent his entire career. Morris started at middle linebacker for the Colts for the first 5 years of his career, and was the Colts' leading special teams tackler in the 2006 season. Morris also started 9 games for the Colts during the 2006 season, including 3 games in the playoffs and Super Bowl XLI, replacing Gilbert Gardner to improve the Colts' run defense. In 2001, Morris had his best statistical year with 114 total tackles (84 solo) and one sack. Morris was an unrestricted free agent after the 2006 season concluded and was re-signed by Indianapolis on March 5. He injured his left knee in the fourth game of 2007, and had season-ending surgery. He was released after a failed physical on February 27, 2008.

=== NFL statistics ===
Year	Team	Games	Combined tackles	Tackles	Assisted tackles	Sacks	Forced fumbles	Fumble recoveries	Fumble return yards	Interceptions	Interception return yards	Yards per interception return	Longest interception return	Interceptions returned for touchdown	Passes defended
2000	IND	7	11	8	3	0.0	0	0	0	0	0	0	0	0	0
2001	IND	14	114	84	30	1.0	0	0	0	0	0	0	0	0	0
2002	IND	16	100	76	24	3.0	1	0	0	0	0	0	0	0	2
2003	IND	16	83	58	25	0.0	0	0	0	0	0	0	0	0	1
2004	IND	15	77	53	24	3.0	1	0	0	1	17	17	17	0	2
2005	IND	14	29	22	7	0.0	0	1	0	0	0	0	0	0	2
2006	IND	15	55	43	12	0.0	0	0	0	0	0	0	0	0	0
2007	IND	2	13	12	1	0.0	0	0	0	0	0	0	0	0	0
Career		99	482	356	126	7.0	2	1	0	1	17	17	17	0	7
