= Columbia High School (Idaho) =

Coordinates: 43.567°N 116.514°W

- 301 Happy Valley Road; Nampa, Idaho; United States

Information
- Type: Public
- Established: 2006
- School district: Nampa S.D. (#131)
- Principal: Cory Woolstenhume
- Faculty: 59.35 (FTE)
- Grades: 9–12
- Enrollment: 1,226 (2023–2024)
- Student to teacher ratio: 20.66
- Colors: Gold & Maroon
- Athletics: IHSAA Class 5A
- Athletics conference: Southern Idaho (4A) (SIC)
- Mascot: Wildcat
- Rivals: Nampa, Skyview
- Information: (208) 498-0571
- Elevation: 2,530 ft (770 m) AMSL
- Website: columbiahigh.nsd131.org

Columbia High School is a four-year public secondary school in Nampa, Idaho, United States. The third major high school in the Nampa School District 131, Columbia opened in 2006, designed with two floors and a separate building for technology, agriculture, and shop classes. The school district shuttles students from one high school to the other to meet their class requirements. Each school has a different focus; Columbia's is technology, performing arts, and broadcasting.

== Naming controversy ==
Before the school was built, the district had decided on the name Aurora High School. The name Aurora was based on the natural phenomenon aurora borealis. Following a letter-writing campaign by students of the middle schools feeding into the future high school, in which reference was made to the character Princess Aurora in the 1959 film Sleeping Beauty, the District altered its proposed name to Columbia High School after the Space Shuttle Columbia disaster. Students accepted this name and it is expected to be permanent.

== Performing arts ==
Immediately after Columbia's establishment, its Performing Arts Department initiated several activities. All choirs in 2006 got a superior in the District Three Competition. The Drama Department has put on plays such as A Girl In The Mirror, Arsenic and Old Lace, and Snoopy, as well as musicals such as Grease and Hairspray. The High school marching band has won their division 9 times. Their shows include Latin Dances, Sound, Shape and Color, Second City Nights, Invincible, Signs, Relic, Persephone, Along Came a Spider, Mechanized, Light Prevails, Lost, The Prayer, and The Path Unseen.

== Athletics ==
Columbia competes in athletics in IHSAA Class 4A, the second highest classification, and are members of the Southern Idaho Conference (4A). Originally in Class 4A, Columbia moved up to 5A in the summer of 2014. Columbia moved back down to 4A in the summer of 2018.

In its first season in 2007, the baseball team won the 4A state championship. The wrestling team won three consecutive 4A state championships (2009–11). The Wildcats football team made the 4A state playoffs in the fall of 2011.

=== State titles ===
Boys

- Wrestling (3): (4A) 2009, 2010, 2011
- Baseball (1): (4A) 2007 (records not kept by IHSAA)

Girls

Dance

- 2010 Champion with 1st in Prop
- 2011 1st in Hip Hop
- 2012 1st in Kick 1st in Hip Hop
- 2019 Runner up with 1st in Hip Hop
- 2020 not contested due to covid
- 2021 Champion with 1st Dance 1st Military 2nd Hip Hop 2nd Kick
- 2022 Runner up with 1st in Prop 2nd in Dance, 3rd in Military and 3rd in Hip Hop
- 2023 Champion with 1st in Hip Hop 1st in Kick, 1st in Military and 1 st in Dance

From Idhsaa.org

== Notable alumni ==
- Zach Penrod (2016), Pitcher in the Boston Red Sox organization
