= Anthony Lukeman =

American military officer (1933–2020)

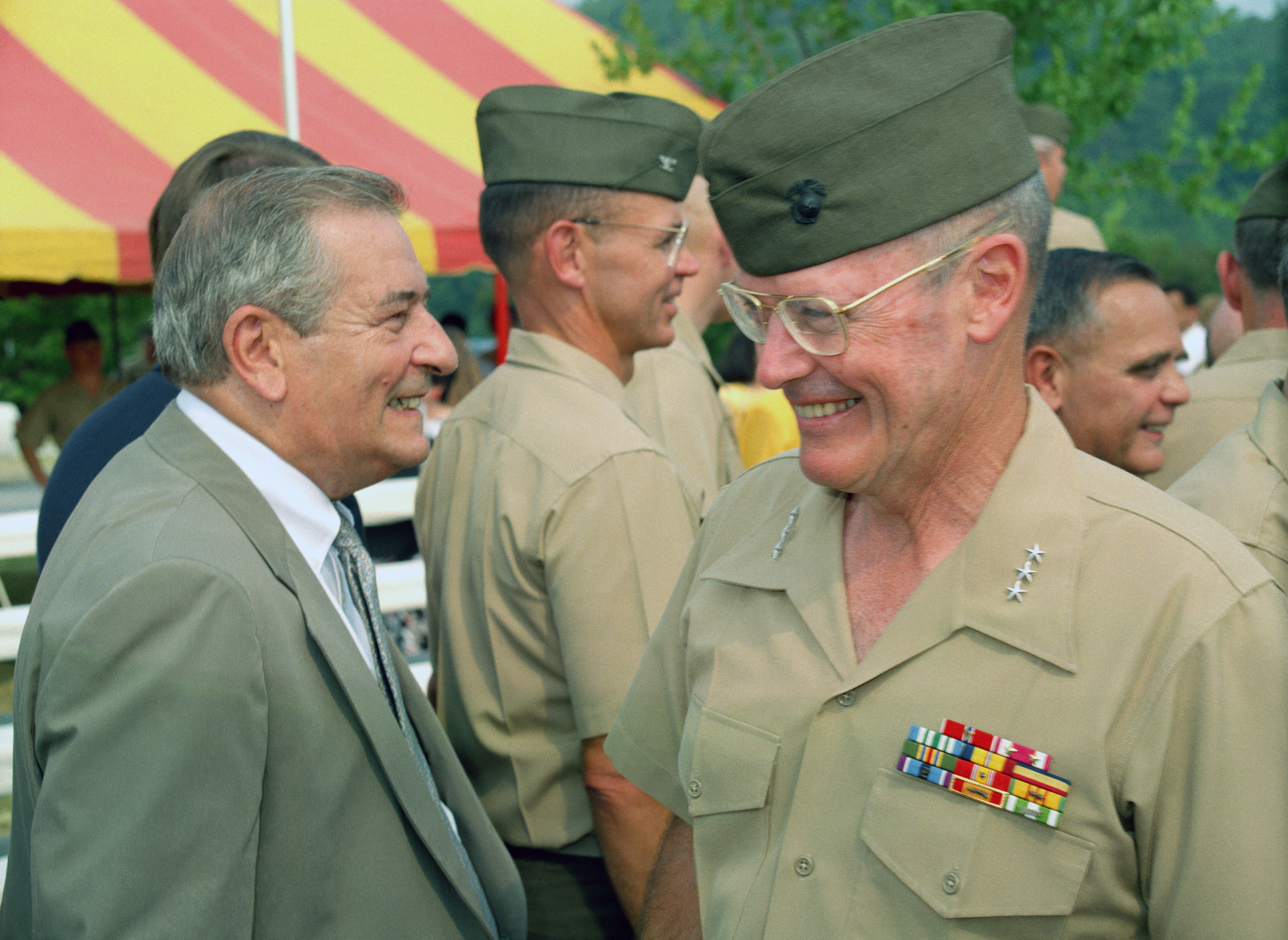
- Lukeman (right) while serving as Deputy Assistant Secretary of Defense
- Born: March 24, 1933; Jamaica, New York, U.S.
- Died: November 11, 2020 (aged 87); Gainesville, Virginia, U.S.
- Military career
- Allegiance: United States
- Branch: United States Marine Corps
- Service years: 1954–1989
- Rank: Lieutenant General

Anthony Lukeman (March 24, 1933 – November 11, 2020) was a lieutenant general in the United States Marine Corps who served as Deputy Assistant Secretary of Defense (Military Manpower and Personnel Policy). He is the father of MajGen James W. Lukeman, USMC (ret).

== Early life and education ==
Lukeman was born on March 24, 1933, in Jamaica, New York, to Gerald Lukeman and Marjorie Rice Lukeman. He took a Bachelor of Arts at Dartmouth College in 1954 and later a master's degree at George Washington University.

== Military career ==
Lukeman was commissioned in 1954, after graduating from Dartmouth. He spent 35 years on active duty, serving in each of the three active Marine divisions and commanding infantry units at platoon, company, battalion and regimental level. He served two tours in Vietnam. During the second, in 1974 and 1975, he worked on the planning and conduct of the evacuation of American and Vietnamese civilians from Saigon. By July 1988 he was Deputy Assistant Secretary of Defense for military manpower and personnel policy, a post he held as a serving lieutenant general. He retired from the Marine Corps in 1989 and was executive director of the Marine Corps Association for the following ten years.

== Awards and decorations ==
- Defense Superior Service Medal, awarded by the Secretary of Defense for service to the Department of Defense
- Bronze Star w/Combat V

== Personal life ==
Lukeman lived in Gainesville, Virginia. He was survived by his wife, Mary Louise Burnett Lukeman, a son and two daughters, a brother, and six grandchildren. He was inurned at Quantico National Cemetery.
