= Mark Weivoda =

American football player (born 1980)

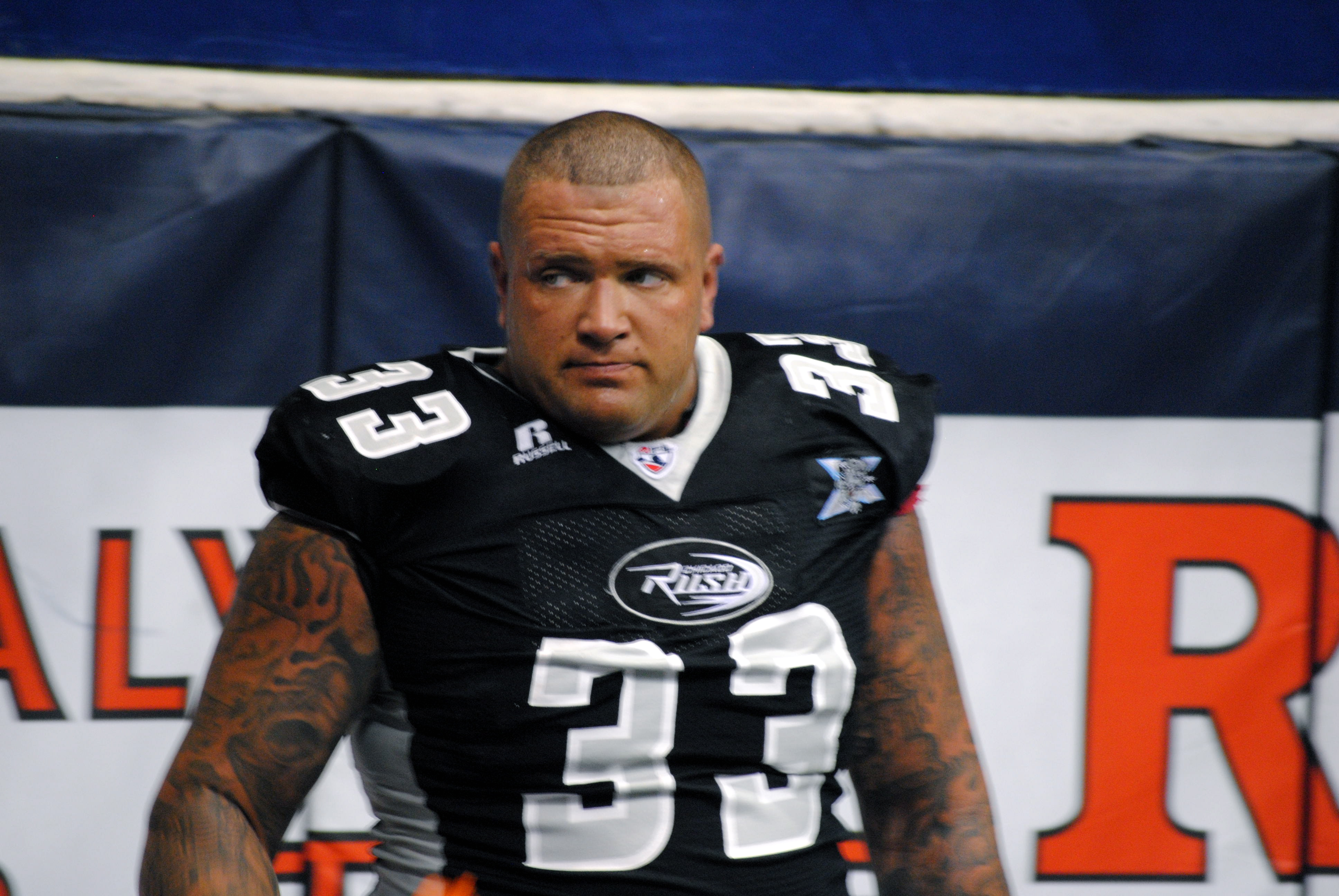
- Weivoda with the Chicago Rush in 2011

No. 33, 44
- Position: Defensive line

Personal information
- Born: November 29, 1980 (age 45); Caldwell, Idaho, U.S.
- Listed height: 6 ft 2 in (1.88 m)
- Listed weight: 295 lb (134 kg)

Career information
- High school: Caldwell
- College: Idaho State
- NFL draft: 2004: undrafted

Career history
- Tampa Bay Buccaneers (2004)*; Memphis Xplorers (2005–2006); Boise Burn (2007–2009); Chicago Rush (2010–2011); San Antonio Talons (2012–2014); Las Vegas Outlaws (2015); Jacksonville Sharks (2016)
- * Offseason or practice squad member only

Career AFL statistics
- Tackles: 57.5
- Sacks: 21
- Forced fumbles: 3
- Fumble recoveries: 5
- Blocked kicks: 2
- Stats at ArenaFan.com

Mark Charles Weivoda (born November 29, 1980) is an American former professional football defensive lineman. He was signed by the Tampa Bay Buccaneers as an undrafted free agent in 2004. He played college football at Idaho State University.

Weivoda also played for the Memphis Xplorers and Boise Burn of the af2, as well as for the Chicago Rush, San Antonio Talons, Las Vegas Outlaws, and Jacksonville Sharks of the Arena Football League.

== Early life ==
Weivoda attended Caldwell High School in Caldwell, Idaho, where he was a three-year letterman in high school football and was voted Most Inspirational and Best Offense Lineman during his senior season. He was twice named All-State and All-Southern Idaho Conference and was honorable mention for the state of Idaho's Player of the Year in 1999.

Cody Pickett was the quarterback at Caldwell High School when Weivoda and the rest of the team qualified for the playoffs each year between 1996 and 1998.

== College career ==
Weivoda played defensive tackle at Idaho State University, lining up alongside Jared Allen from 2000 through 2003. He was also a teammate of Sale Key and Matt Gutierrez. In 2001, Weivoda blocked four field goals and two extra point attempts, tying the NCAA Division I-AA records for blocked field goals and total blocked kicks in a season. He ranks second all-time in Division I-AA history with eight career blocked field goals.

He was twice named first team All-Big Sky Conference and in 2002, he received the Marcus Jackson Award from his teammates.

== Professional career ==
=== Tampa Bay Buccaneers ===
Weivoda was signed by the Tampa Bay Buccaneers as an undrafted free agent in 2004 but was released prior to the beginning of the season.

=== Memphis Xplorers ===
He then signed with the Memphis Xplorers of the af2 in 2005, but his season was cut short by a torn biceps. Weivoda returned to the Xplorers in 2006 and played in 11 games at fullback, linebacker, offensive lineman, and defensive lineman, recording 25 tackles and two sacks on the year.

=== Boise Burn ===
Weivoda returned to Idaho in 2007 to play for the Boise Burn, an expansion team in the af2. He remained with the Burn through the 2009 season, after which the team suspended operations.

=== Chicago Rush ===
Weivoda was assigned to the Chicago Rush of the Arena Football League and played there for the 2010 and 2011 seasons. In 2010, he registered five tackles, four assists, 1.5 sacks, and a fumble recovery. In 2011, he tallied 17 tackles, 9 assists, 8.5 sacks, and three fumble recoveries.

=== San Antonio Talons ===
On November 11, 2011, Weivoda was assigned to the San Antonio Talons for the 2012 season. In 10 games with the Talons, he registered 7.5 total tackles, including 5.5 sacks for a combined loss of 29 yards. Weivoda also tallied two quarterback hurries, blocked a kick, and scored a safety. On June 29, 2012, he was placed on Injured Reserve with a torn biceps.

On January 14, 2013, Weivoda was assigned to the Talons for the 2013 season. He played 10 games for the Talons that season, logging three tackles, 10 assists, four tackles for loss, 2.5 sacks, two quarterback hurries, and a fumble recovery.

During the 2014 season, Weivoda played 15 games and tallied five tackles, four assists, three quarterback sacks, a broken-up pass, three quarterback hurries and two fumble recoveries.

=== Las Vegas Outlaws ===
On October 28, 2014, Weivoda was assigned to the Las Vegas Outlaws as one of the first five players in franchise history. In 15 games with the Outlaws during the 2015 season, he registered three tackles, seven assists, 2.5 sacks, a fumble recovery and a blocked kick.

=== Jacksonville Sharks ===
On October 16, 2015, Weivoda was assigned to the Jacksonville Sharks. On June 7, 2016, Weivoda was placed on recallable reassignment.
