= Marine Corps Association =

The Marine Corps Association (often abbreviated MCA) is the professional organization for members of the United States Marine Corps and friends of the Corps. It is known for its publications Leatherneck Magazine and Marine Corps Gazette. As of 2009, MCA became part of MCA&F, the Marine Corps Association & Foundation.

The MCA occupies a similar role with respect to the Marine Corps that the United States Naval Institute does for the United States Navy, the Association of the United States Army does for the United States Army, and the Air & Space Forces Association does for the United States Air Force and United States Space Force.

== Role ==
The MCA is committed to supporting ALL Marines and fostering education and professionalism within the U.S. Marine Corps. It offers professional education programs, publications (the Gazette and Leatherneck), and other support to Marines. MCA provides events and services to Marines for which the Marine Corps cannot use appropriated funds and is the largest provider of awards to Marines in the world with over 9,000 provided annually.

MCA hosts numerous events annually. These events include six awards dinners where Marines (active duty and reserve) and civilians are presented with more than 40 prestigious awards. The Leftwich Trophy, Hulbert Trophy, Chambers Award, and Shea Award are presented annually at MCA events. Notable speakers at past events include former Secretary of Defense Robert Gates, Gen David Petraeus, Gen Martin Dempsey, Gen Joseph Dunford, Gen Robert Neller, Gen John M. Paxton Jr., and Sean Stackley. MCA also hosts professional dinners in various locations including Hawaii, Camp Lejeune, and Camp Pendleton.

== History ==
=== Origin ===
"We formed the Marine Corps Association after each of us had contributed all he could afford," stated a participant at a meeting on 25 April 1911 at Guantanamo Bay Naval Base, attended by every officer of Colonel L.W.T. Waller's 1st Provisional Marine Brigade. These officers represented 25 percent of the commissioned strength of the Corps. Their stated purpose was to preserve the existence and status of the Marine Corps. In an April 1963 Gazette article, Colonel Robert D. Heinl, Jr., reviewed the turbulent era and events leading to the meeting of these officers and their willingness to stake the newborn group with a fund of more than $5,000.00 out of their own pockets.

Less than two months later, the 1st Provisional Marine Brigade was disbanded without any provision having been made to nurture the infant organization formed on that date. The seed, however, had been sown.

Two years later, again at Guantanamo Bay, officers of the 2d Provisional Marine Brigade commanded by Colonel Lincoln Karmany formally organized the Marine Corps Association. Colonel Karmany appointed Lieutenant Colonel John A. Lejeune as the senior member of a three-man executive committee; 60 officers of the Brigade enrolled as members. The association's purpose was outlined in the following statement signed on 25 April 1913 by the executive committee:

"For the purpose of recording and publishing the history of the Marine Corps, publishing a periodical journal for the dissemination of information concerning the aims, purposes and deeds of the Corps, and the interchange of ideas for the betterment and improvement of its officers and men, the undersigned hereby form an association to be known as The Marine Corps Association, membership in which shall be open to all officers of the Corps."

In early 1915, the command post of the association moved from the field into the commandant's office. A board of control consisting of the commandant, Major General George Barnett as president, and two other officers, Colonel John A. Lejeune and Colonel George Richards, was elected, and a constitution was adopted. The first formally recorded board of control meeting was held on 17 January 1916 in the office of the commandant. The first issue of the Marine Corps Gazette was published in March 1916. An article in that issue provided an account of the development of the association.

Although the Marine Corps Association of today engages in various commercial activities and provides a number of services to its members, those who founded the association had no thought of any direct personal reward or material gain for themselves or for the association's members. This was made clear in the initial Constitution, which set forth the purposes of the association as follows:

"The purposes for which the Association is formed are to disseminate knowledge of the military art and science among its members, and to provide for their professional advancement; to foster the spirit and preserve the traditions of the United States Marine Corps; to increase the efficiency thereof; and to further the interests of the military and naval services in all ways not inconsistent with the good of the general government."

This statement of purposes, probably penned by Lejeune, has endured. It appears unchanged in the association's current articles of incorporation and by-baws.

From 1915 to 1976 the commandant, who was president of the association, presided over its meetings and was responsible for supervising its activities. Since then the commandant has continued to be involved as the honorary president, and the assistant commandant has been elected president. The longstanding relationship with the active Marine Corps continues with the close ties and working relationships with Headquarters Marine Corps; which has characterized the association's operations since 1915 and will continue to be essential for the association's success in fulfilling its mission.

=== World War I to World War II ===
In an article in the March 1918 issue of the Gazette, the secretary-treasurer pointed out that the value of the Gazette determined in great measure the value of the association in carrying out its purpose of advancing professionalism in the Corps. Noting that the Corps had "suddenly expanded from 10,000 to 36,000" with more to come, the author stressed the need to maintain its traditional high standards. He urged all association members to take pen in hand and write for the Gazette, and he provided an exhaustive list of possible subjects.

A special meeting of the board of control was held on 29 July 1918 to elect a replacement for Major General Lejeune, who had departed "on overseas expeditionary duty." At this meeting, Major W. C. Wise, Jr., proposed that "suitable plaques or tablets be installed in the destroyers named after Marines." The board adopted the proposal and an appropriation not exceeding $400 was made from the association's funds to defray the expense of purchasing a number of tablets to be installed on board certain vessels of the Navy about to be christened with the names of distinguished deceased officers and enlisted men of the Marine Corps."

The commandant and four other members of the board were appointed as a committee to carry out this resolution. This action of the board was "in pursuance of the constitutional provision that one of the purposes of the Association is to foster the spirit and preserve the traditions of the United States Marine Corps." Thus was inaugurated the association's award program, which today is a significant contribution to the Corps.

By March 1926, the board of control had evolved into a body of 15 directors, the officers of which were the president, vice-president, secretary/treasurer, and the editor of the Gazette. An executive committee was charged with the "direct management and control of the affairs of the Association and with carrying out the policies of the President and Board of Directors." Dues were $5 per year for active members and $2 per year for associate members. About one-half of the officers of the Corps were active members. The Gazette was published quarterly with dues barely sufficient to defray the cost of publication.

In the early 1930s, the association "found itself at the crossroads." Of the 1,178 commissioned and warrant officers in the Corps, 403 were members of the association. Nine of the 12 general officers and 21 of the 34 colonels were enrolled. Dues had been reduced to $3 per year. The annual income was only $1,209. One proposal would have the association consolidate with the U.S. Naval Institute and another would have the Gazette merge with Leatherneck. These proposals were rejected. Instead, Brigadier General George Richards was asked to draft and distribute an appeal for support to the "entire officer personnel of the Marine Corps" who were not members of the association.

In the August 1932 issue of the Gazette, General Richards published the results of his efforts, reporting that membership had been increased to 744 active members and that the annual income had increased by 80 percent to a total of $2,232. In his detailed report he chided junior officers who complained that they could not afford $3 per year by pointing out that, "... this is less than one cent a day – the cost of one cigarette." Through the efforts of General Richards and others who supported it, the association made it through the lean years during and following the depression. In his report, General Richards attempted to dispel the notion (a notion still prevalent) that the association was, mostly about the Gazette. He stated:

"The Association publishes its magazine; the membership receives copies – but, no officer should understand that in joining the Association as a member he is only subscribing to a magazine. That publication and its distribution are the means through which the purposes of the Association are fulfilled."

=== Post World War II ===
In an April 1953 Gazette piece marking the "40th anniversary" of the founding of the association, the editors observed that, "For a while the organization seemed to live the life of a gypsy, wandering up and down the East Coast. New York, Philadelphia, Norfolk, Baltimore and Washington housed either the Association or the Gazette before both found a home at Quantico early in 1946." Before 1943 the Gazette had been published quarterly. By 1947 the association was well established at Quantico and the Gazette had become a monthly publication supported by appropriated funds with a staff of active duty Marines. In 1944 non-profit status for the association was approved by the Internal Revenue Service. The association had evolved informally during the war years into a recognized and fully supported Marine Corps entity, but it needed official recognition and status. On 2 May 1947, General Vandegrift, in his capacity as president, approved a "Revised Constitution of the Marine Corps Association," providing the framework within which the association operated until the early 1970s, when all appropriated fund support was withdrawn.

In the new Constitution the statement of purpose was carried over verbatim from the original Constitution. Nonvoting membership was opened to any member or former member of "the armed services of the United States." The board of governors now consisted of:

- Commandant of the Marine Corps
- Director, Division of Plans & Policies
- Director, Division of Public Relations
- Director, Division of Aviation
- Commandant of Marine Corps Schools
- Secretary/treasurer

The revised constitution provided that the commandant, as president, would have general powers of supervision over the association, and that a secretary/treasurer, to be recommended by the board and approved by the president, would control the general management of the business of the association and be editor-in-chief of all publications. This became an extra duty for the general officer holding the position of Director of the Development Center at Quantico. Further, the new constitution provided for the publication of the Gazette and the operation of the Gazette Bookshop. The editor-in-chief of the Gazette would be assisted by active duty officers and enlisted Marines, who would be assigned such duties "as required and available." The Gazette Bookshop would be operated for the convenience of association members, who would be allowed a reasonable discount. All revenue from the Gazette and the Bookshop, above operating expenses, would accrue to the association.

In mid-1962, the secretary/treasurer filed with IRS for designation of the association as a tax-exempt organization. In responding to the application on 16 May 1962, the IRS reply concluded that the association was an activity of the Marine Corps, and thus of the U.S. Government, and was not subject to income tax. The IRS letter provides an excellent summary of the operations and activities of the association had evolved under the revised constitution of 1947. In his letter to the association's secretary-treasurer, the IRS writer stated:

"You are governed by those high-ranking officers of the Marine Corps as are assigned to certain commands and positions within the Corps. You are audited quarterly by a representative of the Inspector General, Marine Corps, and you are inventoried quarterly by an inventory board appointed by the Commandant, Marine Corps Schools. The editor and publisher, business manager, and managing editor of your official publication, the Marine Corps Gazette, are active duty Marine officers regularly assigned to those duties by the Marine Corps.

"Your primary activities are the publishing of the Marine Corps Gazette and operation of a book service at Quantico; Virginia, to obtain primarily professional books for Marines around the world. You also publish professional books of particular interest to Marines. You make awards for honor graduates of certain military courses and sponsor the annual Marine Corps Competition in Arms."

=== Early 1970s crisis and transition ===
The association faced its greatest crisis in February 1972, when the commandant, complying with a Secretary of Defense order, advised the Marine Corps Association that active duty personnel could no longer be assigned to the association's activities at Quantico. The association's activities would now have to become self-supporting if they were to continue. The Leatherneck Association, also located at Quantico, was faced with the same issue. Fortunately, Marines with experience, foresight and ability including Brigadier General Louis H. Wilson, then stationed at Quantico, conducted a management study that resulted in the decision to hire an executive director for the association.

The association employed Colonel Bevan G. Cass, who was ending a distinguished Marine Corps career, as its first executive director. His zeal, tireless efforts and business acumen led to immediate results. He fashioned the framework within which the business activities of the association are carried on at present.

Operating from a decaying temporary building near Butler Stadium at Quantico, Colonel Cass set a course for a period of growth, expansion of services, and increased support of the active Marine Corps that continues today. Revenue from the bookstore increased steadily; significant income was derived from the investment of cash reserves; a print shop and computer service were established; and formal accounting and management procedures were put in place. When Colonel Cass completed his seven years with the association in 1978, he left a profitable, well-organized business entity fully capable of carrying out the association's purposes.

In a farewell interview upon his retirement from active duty in July 1979, General Wilson commented on the problems confronting the association in the early 1970s:

"The easiest thing for me to have done in 1970 when restrictions were put on concerning active duty military personnel serving on staffs of civilian associations would have been to dissolve the Association. Many people believed that the cost of running the MCA with civilians would be so high that we couldn't survive. I didn't believe it then, and I've been proven right. It took a lot of hard work, but the Association was worth saving to continue its work."

In line with the decision to continue the association as a self-supporting civilian entity, the board of governors concluded that the association should be incorporated, and on 8 November 1972 a certificate of incorporation was issued to the association by the District of Columbia. Except for a minor change in 1976, these articles of incorporation constitute the association's present charter. The initial board of governors included the commandant, General Robert E. Cushman, Jr., and 16 other officers (11 on active duty, three from the reserves and two retired). The statement of purposes first penned by Lejeune and others in 1915 was included in this newest charter.

=== 1976 Merger ===
At the same time as the major changes noted above were occurring, it became apparent that a further reorganization, joining the Leatherneck Association and the Marine Corps Association, would benefit both organizations and the Marine Corps. The Leatherneck Association had gained a hard-won place in the Corps since its birth 59 years before when:

"In 1917, three enlisted Marines at Quantico decided that they and their buddies should have a paper which contained material of specific interest to Marines. On an off-duty basis and with assistance from the Army-Navy YMCA they published the first issue of The Quantico Leatherneck on 17 November 1917." (Quoted from a paper prepared for Leatherneck Association members in 1964.).

After 1920, the Leatherneck magazine was published at the Marine Barracks in Washington under the auspices of the Marine Corps Institute. In 1943, the Leatherneck Association was incorporated, and by the end of 1975, it had moved its office and activities to Quantico. The assistant commandant headed its board of managers.

As commandant and president of the Marine Corps Association, General Wilson appointed a committee headed by Brigadier General P.X. Kelley to look again at the potential advantages of merging the Leatherneck Association and the Marine Corps' Association.

On 27 February 1976 General Kelley submitted the committee's report recommending the "dissolution of the Leatherneck Association and the transfer of all funds and assets to the Marine Corps Association." The report pointed out that each association published a magazine, provided a book service, sponsored an insurance plan and carried out an extensive awards program. It noted that the Marine Corps Association had 12 employees with a total annual salary of approximately $135,000 and the Leatherneck Association had 26 employees with a total annual salary of approximately $261,000, and it noted that in the most recent year (1975) the Marine Corps Association showed a profit of $50,000, while the Leatherneck Association recorded a net loss of $35,000.

Despite that financial loss in 1975, the Leatherneck Association had a lot to offer in a merger and Leatherneck remained the Corps' most widely distributed magazine. "The Guidebook for Marines" (originated and revised as needed by Leatherneck staff) provided a steady income in addition to being an effective basic professional text for young Marines. The Leatherneck health plans, featuring· CHAMPUS supplements, were popular and much needed by Marine families at a time of diminishing care in military hospitals. A substantial amount of cash remained on hand as well as many saleable publications in its bookstore. The Leatherneck Association also maintained a mature awards program designed to encourage professional excellence by enlisted Marines in schools and training programs.

The Kelley Committee's recommendation was approved, and the D.C. Government issued a Certificate of Merger whereby the Leatherneck Association was merged into the Marine Corps Association effective on 31 August 1976. The original 1915 statement of purposes was retained and another paragraph added, as follows:

"(d) To effect the above and to benefit and build the morale of past, present and future members of the United States Marine Corps and the United States Marine Corps Reserve and their families, as well as the public generally by editing, illustrating, publishing, printing, selling and distributing magazines, pamphlets, books, reports, literary works, and publications of all kinds and by engaging in any other lawful activity designed and carried on to aid the members, their dependents and their survivors."

The addition of this paragraph shows that the Marine Corps Association had moved beyond its original (although still primary) purposes of contributing to the professionalism of the Corps and preserving its spirit and traditions. The amendment acknowledged that the association had evolved into a business-oriented entity with an additional purpose of providing benefits to its members. The fact is, however, that the revenues derived from the business activities of the association, are used to carry out its primary purpose of supporting the educational and historical programs of the Marine Corps.

The new bylaws provided for an executive director, who would also serve as secretary/treasurer. The number of governors was set at 19 with no reference to any specific active duty position or officer. It was understood however, by those who effected the merger, that the commandant would be named as the honorary president, and that the assistant commandant would thereafter serve as the president of the board of governors.

In January 1979, Brigadier General George L. Bartlett succeeded Colonel Cass as executive director. Under his stewardship, spanning a period of ten years, the association continued to grow and prosper.

While at Quantico in the early 1970s General Wilson had foreseen the need for a permanent home for the association. His vision was for a building at Quantico that would serve not only as headquarters for the association, but would also provide space for other Marine-related organizations. The Kelley Committee report recommended "a new building be constructed at MCDEC for the Marine Corps Association," and as an interim step, the association be moved to the "old Post Headquarters (building 1019) MCDEC." This latter recommendation was carried out in 1976, and the executive director, sitting in the same office occupied decades earlier by Lejeune and Butler, could gaze out at "Iron Mike."

In 1985, the board of governors gave its approval for the construction of a headquarters building for the association to be located "on base" at Quantico. An arrangement with the Marine Corps was negotiated whereby the association would construct and furnish the building with the right to occupy it for a period of 50 years. After 50 years, title to the building would revert to the government, at which time appropriate arrangements would be made for continued occupancy by the association.

Under General Bartlett's close supervision, the association's building was designed and constructed at a cost of approximately $3 million. The senior officer at the 10 November 1986 dedication ceremony was the association's president, General Thomas R. Morgan. At its fall meeting in 1988, the board of governors, as a tribute to General Bartlett, approved a resolution to name the building after him.

Lieutenant General Anthony Lukeman was selected to replace General Bartlett in January 1989. Under his leadership significant actions included a major addition to the building; assimilation of the Marine Corps University Foundation, Marine Corps Historical Foundation, Toys for Tots Foundation, and Society of Former Agents of the FBI, joining the Marine Corps Aviation Association as valued tenants in the MCA building; an expanded awards program; new benefits and options for participants in the insurance programs; publication of original works of substantial value to the Marine Corps; special initiatives to promote the Marine Corps' professional reading program; a new emphasis on the importance of enlisted Marines as members of the association; major advances in automation to include desktop publishing of the magazines and investment in automation hardware and software for all business processes; development of a formal strategic planning and programming process; and a new formal relationship among the association, the Marine Corps University Foundation and the Historical Foundation intended to capitalize on the combined strength of the three organizations in support of the Marine Corps. This last action followed long-time consideration as discussed in the next several paragraphs.

=== Interface With other Marine-related organizations ===
The Marine Corps Association is one of many organizations having an affinity or relationship to the Marine Corps. Most of these organizations are fraternal in nature, and while the members may have a deep-seated devotion and loyalty to the Corps, their primary motivation for belonging stems from their service with a particular Marine Corps unit. The Marine Corps Association, the Marine Corps University Foundation, and the Marine Corps Historical Foundation, however, are unique in that they were organized and exist for the primary purpose of supporting ongoing programs of the active Marine Corps. To effectively serve their purposes, their activities must support and be carried out with the guidance and cooperation of the active Marine Corps leadership.

The Marine Corps Historical Foundation was formed in 1979 for the purpose of supporting the historical programs and objectives of the Marine Corps. Its formation was encouraged by General Wallace M. Greene, Jr., who was a charter member and, for a number of years, served as Honorary Chairman, taking an active role in the foundation's development. In 1980, the Marine Corps University Foundation (initially called the Marine Corps Command and Staff College Foundation) was created to support and augment the professional training of Marines. General Leonard F. Chapman was its first president and continued in this capacity for 13 years. It is clear from a reading of the charters of these Foundations that their purposes are encompassed within those of the Marine Corps Association.

The common purposes of the Marine Corps Association and the two foundations became immediately apparent following their formation. In 1980, Lieutenant General William K. Jones, a member of the association's board of governors, chaired an ad hoc committee for the association, which reported:

"The Committee was unanimous that an annual donation should be made to [each of the two Foundations], the amount to be determined by the Board of Governors dependent on the amount of profit realized by the Association. $10,000.00 is recommended as a starting sum."

As a result of the Jones Committee report, the association's by-laws were amended in 1981 by adding the following:

"The Board of Governors may from time to time authorize grants, gifts or gratuitous services to other organizations or activities when their use will be in consonance with the purposes of the Association. Specifically, the Association shall support the Marine Corps (University) Foundation and the Marine Corps Historical Foundation.”

In the years since 1981, the association has made significant grants to each foundation. On 6 February 1989, the association established a planning committee, the first report of which contains the following statement:

“The consensus was that the Marine Corps Association should be open to requests from the Historical Foundation and the (University” Foundation and that the Marine Corps Association should assist those Foundations, if needed, with management assistance or other actions designed to ensure the success of their support of the Corps.”

The report suggested the establishment of a coordinating body with members representing the association and the two foundations. Accordingly, the president of the Marine Corps Association formed such a committee with the purpose of providing a planning forum to promote the close coordination, mutual support and possible integration of the activities of the association and the two Foundations. The expectation was that the synergistic effect of this closer relationship would enhance the ability of all three organizations to serve their primary purpose of supporting the ongoing education and history programs of the active Marine Corps. As a result of the committee’s efforts, events proved those expectations to be correct.

In the 1980s and 90s, the association’s net worth grew significantly. As a result, there was the potential for the association to expand its in-house activities with a consequent increase in staff and overhead and, as appropriate, to support other established Marine Corps related organizations whose mission encompasses support of the Marine Corps’ educational and historical programs. To establish a policy with respect to the use of its available resources, the board of governors adopted a strategic plan in 1997 outlining specific aims and goals, supported by programming documents showing potential use of resources for a five-year period ending in 2001.

=== MCA in the 21st century ===
In 2007, MCA acquired The MARINE Shop (TMS). The retail store began operating online in 2009. TMS is located in Quantico, VA and Camp Lejeune, NC. Both stores carry Marine Corps themed gifts, apparel and books and offer special services such as Engraving, Dog Tags (Camp Lejeune only), and Medal/Ribbon Mounting. Purchases at The MARINE Shop support Marine programs.

In 2009, the Marine Corps Association Foundation (MCAF) was created to further the Marine Corps Association's mission and expand its reach and message to friends of the Corps. The foundation helps develop leaders by providing forums for Marines to develop professionally, exchange ideas and preserve the traditions of the Corps. MCAF stands by Marines with valuable resources through every step of their Marine Corps journey. This is possible through donations and membership dues of Marines, their families and friends of the Corps. The foundation is a 501(c)3 charitable organization.

The current president and CEO is Major General Edward Usher, USMC (Ret) who assumed his position at the association in 2010 on his retirement from the Marine Corps.

In 2015, the Marine Corps Association had 66,000 members and spent over $1,000,000 in support of Marines.

Click the link to view MCA's 2015 Annual Report. https://www.mca-marines.org/sites/default/files/2015%20Annual%20Report%20Complete.pdf

== Programs for Marines ==
Marine Corps Association Foundation Programs:

- The Commanders' Unit Library Program
- Commanders' Forum Program
- The Marine Excellence Awards Program
- Marine Writing Program
- Wounded Marine Support
- Go to https://www.mcafdn.org for more information

== Writing awards ==
The Marine Corps Association gives out a number of professional writing awards annually to serving Marines.

Awards include:

- Colonel Bevan G. Cass Award for professional writings, open to all active duty Marines
- The Ronald D. Lyons Writing Award for the author of the best news or feature story in Leatherneck Magazine (restricted to Sergeant and below)
- The Tom Bartlett Award for the best Leatherneck Magazine cover photograph of the year
- The Lou Lowery Award for the best Leatherneck Magazine internal photograph of the year (restricted to Sergeant and below)
- The Sergeant Major Dan Daly Award for the best historical writing in a base or post publication of the year (restricted to enlisted Marines)
- MajGen Harold W. Chase Prize Essay Contest for essays that challenge conventional wisdom by proposing change to a current Marine Corps directive, policy, custom, or practice.
- Sergeant Major of the Marine Corps Writing Award for the best Gazette article authored by an enlisted Marine in the calendar year
- Gen Robert E. Hogaboom Leadership Writing Contest for the essay that is the most original in its approach to the various aspects of leadership.
- Col Francis F. "Fox" Parry Writing Award for the best “combat initiative” article published in the Marine Corps Gazette over a 2-year period
- LtCol Earl “Pete” Ellis Annual Essay Contest for the best essay written about that year's theme
- Kiser Family Irregular Warfare Essay Contest for the best essay written about preparing for irregular warfare in the future pertaining to that year's unique theme
- Leatherneck Writing Award for the best essay on Marine Corps history or current events, open to all Marines

== See also ==
- Air & Space Forces Association
- Association of the United States Army
- Space Force Association
- United States Naval Institute
- Coast Guard Foundation
