= Nampa School District =

School district in Idaho, United States

Nampa School District 131 (NSD) is a school district headquartered in Nampa, Idaho.

Located in Canyon County, it includes the majority of Nampa. A tract of land in Caldwell extends into this district.

== Academics ==
=== Academic Proficiency ===
Based on ISAT (Idaho Standards Achievement Test) or IDAA (Idaho Alternative Assessments) for proficiency.

- English Language Arts/Literacy proficiency : 41.2%
- Mathematics proficiency: 28.3%
- Science proficiency: 29.7%
- Idaho Reading Indicator: 68.7%

=== Success indicators ===
- Chronic absenteeism rate: 20.3%
- College and career readiness course enrollment: 87.0%
- Four-year graduation rate (Class of 2025 cohort): 81.8%
- Five-year graduation rate (Class of 2024 cohort): 81.6%

== Student Demographics ==
In Spring 2026, enrollment in the district was 12,364.

As of the 2024–2025 school year, Nampa School District enrolled 12,364 students in grades kindergarten through 12 and is classified as a non-rural district.

=== Student characteristics ===
Approximately 56.0% of students were from low-income families. The district reported 15.0% English learners and 14.0% students with disabilities. Additional populations included 6.0% students experiencing homelessness, 5.0% from migrant families, 3.0% from military families, and fewer than 1% in foster care.

=== Race and ethnicity ===
Enrollment by race and ethnicity was reported as:

- White: 51.8%
- Hispanic or Latino: 41.2%
- Multiracial: 4.6%
- Black or African American: 0.9%
- Native Hawaiian or Pacific Islander: 0.6%
- Asian: 0.5%
- Native American or Alaska Native: 0.3%

=== Gender ===
The student population was 51.4% male and 48.6% female.

== History ==
In 2001, the district had over 11,000 students. That year, it was experiencing overcrowding. The district leadership proposed a school bond worth $39,750,000.

In 2022, the school district board of trustees ordered the banning of 24 books from school libraries, including The Kite Runner.

The district began a four school day per week schedule in 2024, and at the time it was the largest school district in Idaho to do so. Circa 2004, the district had all of its high schools operate on a semester system, with eight classes at a time. Classes were held on alternating A and B days. In 2024, the school district moved to a trimester system. Haadiya Tariq of the Idaho Press wrote that, citing these choices and the school closures, this became "a difficult 2023-2024 school year full of hard decisions".

== Schools ==
K-12 schools

- Nampa Online Virtual Academy (NOVA)

Middle and high schools

- Union School

High schools

- Columbia High School (2006)
- Nampa High School (1901, 1917, 1955)
- Skyview High School (1996)
- Career and Technical Education/Idaho Center for Advanced Technology
- Nampa Academy
- STEM Academy Idaho Center for Advanced Technology

K-8 schools

- New Horizons Dual Language School

Middle schools

- East Valley Middle School
- Lone Star Middle School
- South Middle School

Elementary schools

- Central Elementary School - In 2023 a closure was proposed, but the school board kept it open.
- Endeavor Elementary School
- Iowa Elementary School
- Lake Ridge Elementary School
- Owyhee Elementary School
- Park Ridge Elementary School
- Ronald Reagan Elementary School
- Franklin D. Roosevelt Elementary School
- Sherman Elementary School
- Willow Creek Elementary School
- Gateways Program

Preschool

- Nampa Early Childhood Center

=== Former schools ===
Middle schools

- West Middle School

Elementary schools

- Centennial Elementary School
- Greenhurst Elementary School
- Snake River Elementary School
