= Vallivue High School =

Coordinates: 43.620°N 116.681°W

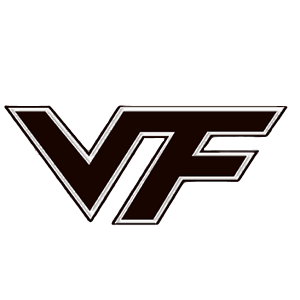
- 1407 East Homedale Rd. Caldwell, Idaho; United States

Information
- Type: Public
- Motto: Touching the Future
- Established: 1963; 63 years ago
- School district: Vallivue S.D. (#139)
- Principal: Kellie Dean
- Teaching staff: 65.55 (on an FTE basis)
- Grades: 9–12
- Enrollment: 1,247 (2023–2024)
- Student to teacher ratio: 19.02
- Colors: Brown and gold
- Athletics: IHSAA Class 5A
- Athletics conference: Southern Idaho (5A) (SIC)
- Mascot: Falcon
- Rivals: Caldwell
- Newspaper: Falcon Flyer
- Yearbook: Talon
- Feeder schools: Vallivue Middle School, Summitvue Middle School, Rivervue Middle School (Alternative)
- Elevation: 2,440 ft (744 m) AMSL
- Website: Vallivue High School

Vallivue High School is a four-year public secondary school in Caldwell, Idaho, United States, and one of two traditional high schools in the Vallivue School District. Opened 63 years ago in 1963, the school's campus is between Caldwell and Lake Lowell on the corner of Montana and Homedale roads. The current principal is Kellie Dean. The school colors are brown and gold to represent the school's rich agricultural tradition, and its mascot is a falcon.

== Athletics ==
Vallivue competes in athletics in IHSAA Class 4A with the second largest schools in the state. It is a member in the Southern Idaho Conference (4A) (SIC), whose other nine members are in adjacent Ada County. VHS's main rival is the cross-district Ridgevue High School, now in Class 4A. In earlier years, Caldwell had the larger enrollment and competed in A-1 (now 5A), and Vallivue was in A-2.

=== State titles ===
Boys

- Football (2): fall (A-2) 1979; (A-1 Div II, now 4A) 1999 (official with introduction of playoffs, A-2 in 1978)
- Cross country (4): fall (B) 1992, (A-2) 1996, 1997; (A-1, Div II) 2000 (introduced in 1964)
- Basketball (3): (A-2) 1976; (A-1, Div II) 2001; (5A) 2008
- Baseball (6): (A-2) 1985, 1986, 1987, 1988, 1989; (A-1, Div II) 2001
  (records not kept by IHSAA, state tourney introduced in 1971, A-2 in 1980)
- Track (1): (A-1 Div II) 2001
- Golf (2): (A-1 Div II) 2001, (4A) 2002
- Soccer (1): (4A) 2020

Girls

- Cross country (1): fall (A-1, Div II) 2000 (introduced in 1974)
- Basketball (1): (4A) 2006 (introduced in 1976)

Combined

- Tennis (2): (4A) 2002, 2003 (combined until 2008)

Marching Band (7) 2009,2010,2011,2012,2013,2014,2015

== Notable alumni ==
- Matt Bauscher, Former professional basketball player
- Dan Eismann (1965), justice of the Idaho Supreme Court (2001–17); chief justice (2007–11)
- Maria Dahvana Headley, Novelist
- Lan Larison (2020), NFL running back for the New England Patriots
- John McGee, Politician
- Jim McMillan, Former professional football player
