= Chicago International REEL Shorts Festival =

US annual short film competition

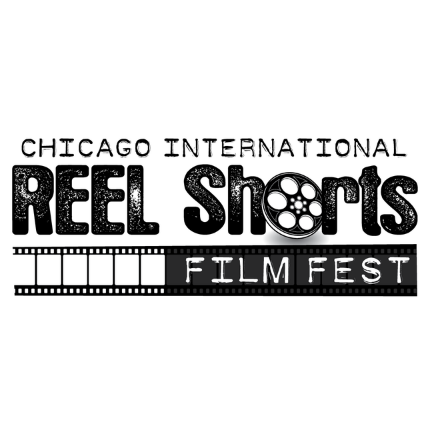

Davis Theatre in Chicago during the festival

The Chicago International REEL Shorts Festival is an annual short film competition and screening put on by Project Chicago. The festival was founded by Scott Rudolph and Nels Dahlquist. Held annually, this three-day event plays host to more than 150 films (all under 35 minutes) from many countries throughout the world.

In 2017 the venue changed to Chicago Filmmakers' Firehouse Cinema located at 1326 W Hollywood Ave in the city of Chicago.

Some venues in years past include Columbia College's beautiful penthouse theater.

In 2004 and 2005 the 3-Penny Cinema, in Chicago's Lincoln Park district, was the main venue. In 2006 REEL Shorts moved to the historic Davis Theatre in Lincoln Square. In 2007, 2009. 2009 Columbia College came on as a presenting sponsor and the festival is to be held at Columbia's Film Row Theatre.

== Particular years ==
=== 2004 ===
Festival dates: September 17–19

==== Winners ====
- Best Short Film: Directing Rye
- Best Cinematography: Just Like You Imagined
- Best Animation: The Lester Show
- Best Comedy: Unemployed
- Best SciFi Short: Untitled 003: Embryo
- Best Documentary: The Harvest
- Best Music Video: Drunken Liar
- Creepiest Short: Victim
- Audience Choice Awards:
  - Two To Tango
  - Robot Boy
  - Untitled 003: Embryo
  - Rocketscience
  - Reservations
  - Very Proud House
  - The Fridge
  - Unemployed
  - Victim
  - Fly Away
  - Notes from the Space Time Continuum
  - Fishing For Trauster
- Honorable mention:
  - Edmund
  - Consideration
  - SPIN
  - Sunday Morning Stripper
  - The Next
  - Gay By Dawn
  - Euro American

=== 2005 ===
Festival dates: September 30 – October 2

==== Winners ====
- Best Short Film of 2005: SKYLAB
- Best Sci-Fi: Alliance
- Best Horror: Short Shadow Man
- Best Documentary: Kings of Christmas
- Best Comedy: Dating Tips for Seniors
- Best Youth Film: My First Kiss
- Best Animation: Emilia
- Best Music Video: High Speed Scene
- Best Action Film: Lucky (Australian)
- Best Foreign (tie): Hamoudi & Emil / Le Carnet Rouge
- Best Experimental (tie): Allison / Jane Lloyd
- Audience Choice Awards:
  - Totem Pole
  - Skylab
  - Alliance
  - I Spy With My Little Eye
  - Pumpkin of Nyefar
  - Wishtaker
  - You're Breaking Up
  - Flatbush
  - Gopher Broke
  - Mr. Dramatic
  - Lucky (Australian Action Film)
  - Roadkill
  - Breaking into Bollywood
  - Poet of Canis
  - I Killed Zoe Day
  - Good Vibrations
- Honorable mention:
  - TOXIN
  - Duct Tape + Cover
  - MJD
  - SHOES
  - 13 Waffles
  - Wishtaker
  - Detroit: Not for Wimps

=== 2006 ===
Festival dates: September 29 – October 1

==== Winners ====
- Best of Fest: La La Land
- Best Animation: Dry Sky
- Best Horror Film: Recently Deceased
- Best Documentary Short: Rising Above the Wave
- Best Music Video: Melody Nife
- Best Youth Short: Winter Attack
- Audience Choice Awards:
  - Get Me Brenda Vaccaro
  - Keg of the Dead
  - La La Land
  - An American Revolution
  - Nowakowsky
  - Like Father Like Edison
  - The World's Most Dangerous Polka Band
  - Imbroglio
  - Snoozer
  - The Life and Death of a Pumpkin
  - Searching for Mr. Stupendo
  - Great American Youth
- Honorable mention:
  - Nowakowsky

=== 2007 ===
Festival dates: September 21–23

==== Winners ====
- Best of Fest: The Trainee
- Best Comedy: The Planning Lady
- Best Music Video: 1992
- Best Scifi: D-I-M, Deus in Machina
- Best Chicago Film: The European Kid
- Best Documentary: Ghost Town: 24 Hours in Terlingua
- Best Animation: I Met the Walrus
- Audience Choice Awards:
  - The Meter
  - The Planning Lady
  - Land of the Free
  - Two Days Notice
  - Dog Jack
  - The Trainee
  - W.O.R.M. – Worldwide Organic Replicating Molecule
  - Call of Nature
  - Unraveling
  - Release
  - The Von
- Honorable mention:
  - Mommy! Mommy! There's a Monster on the Stairs!

=== 2008 ===
Festival dates: September 11–14

==== Winners ====
- Best of the Fest: Science Fair
- Best Comedy: Home Cooked Meal
- Best Music Video: The Life Here
- Best Chicago Film: Greg's Leg
- Best Documentary: Baby Face
- Best Animation: The Flower
- Best Youth Film: Super Kitten and the Power Pets
- Audience Choice Awards:
  - Small Comforts
  - Looking Up Dresses
  - Near Miss
  - Living with Landmines
  - Find My Way
  - The Un-Gone
  - Miracle Investigators
  - Mallow
  - Last Dance
  - Directors Cut
  - PUSH
  - A Man's Image
- Honorable mentions:
  - Y Not
  - Terminus
  - Piñatas Revenge
  - Verboten

=== 2009 ===
Festival dates: September 10–14

==== Winners ====
- Best of the Fest: Sky People
- Best Break-Up Film: L.O.V.E.
- Best Romantic Comedy: True Love
- Best Youth Entry: Sparks in the Night
- Best Artistic Movie: Stringing in the Streets
- Best Romantic Movie: A Time of Flowers
- Best Revenge Movie: Alessandra
- Best Music Video: City of Noise
- Best Horror Movie: Tinglewood
- Most Disturbing Movie: Grandma's House
- Best Foreign Film: Stella
- Best Political Drama: October Surprise
- Best Comedy: A Small Silent Film About Death
- Best Demented Movie: Fish & Chip
- Most Profane Statement: James K. Polk was @#?!ing Awesome
- Honorable Mention:
  - Melt Down
  - Max & Helena
  - More Than You Can Chew
  - CAMFBH
  - Ex-Bully
  - WoW! What A Great Question!
  - My First Experimental Film
  - The Only One
  - The Disconnection of Cyrus Bent
- People's Choice Awards: Under The Table In Barcelona, At Last, Okemah!

=== 2014 ===
Festival dates: October 9–12

==== Winners ====
- Best Short Film: The King of URL'S
- Best Drama: The Cut/ Le Coupe
- Best Comedy: Lez Be Honest
- Best Documentary: Cloth Paper Dreams
- Best Animation: Desmondo Ray
- Best Actor: The Discount of Ed Telfair – Jeff Bailey
- Best Actress: Lez Be Honest – Christine Rodriguez
- Best Supporting Actor: The King of URL'S – Adam Poss
- Best Supporting Actress: I Can See You – Brenda Strong
- Best Director: Vigilante – Benedict Sanderson
- Best Cinematography: Cloth Paper Dreams – Travis Tank
- Best Editing: Une balade a la mer – Damien Stein
- Audience Choice Awards:
  - Journeyman
  - Deflated, Twinkies & Donuts, magiCATastrophe
  - The Amazing Mr. Ash
  - Lucy
  - Vigilante
  - Beyond the Mat
  - Post Reality
  - The Heebie-Jeebies
  - Love You Still
  - The King of URL'S

=== 2015 ===
Festival dates: December 11–12

==== Winners ====
- Best Short Film: Who is Riley Oakes
- Best Drama: The Decision
- Best Comedy: Moving On
- Best Documentary: The Simple Gift of the Walnut Grove
- Best Animation: An Ode to Love
- Best Director: We Interrupt This Broadcast
- Best Horror/Suspense: Awakenings
- Best Science Fiction: Welcome to Forever
- Audience Choice Awards:
  - The ART POLICE
  - El Capo de Capos
  - F the Moon
  - Bark Mitzvah
  - Out of Touch
  - The Champion
  - Family Meal
  - In the Dark

=== 2016 ===
Festival dates: December 2–3

==== Winners ====
- Best Short Film: Easy Life
- Best Drama: Muhammad Ali – The Olive Branch
- Best Comedy: That's Love
- Best Animation: Riptide Rhapsody
- Best Quirky Film: The Uptowners
- Best Documentary: Superfan
- Best TV Pilot/Webisode: Curfeud Episode 1
- Audience Choice Awards:
  - Superfan
  - Three of a Kind
  - Secrets We Keep
  - Carfield
  - Sojourn
  - Hard Knock Robots
  - Boy

=== 2017 ===
Festival dates: November 10–11

==== Winners ====
- Best Short Film: Confession
- Best Drama: Counting
- Best Comedy: ctrl-alt-delete
- Best Animation: La Postina
- Best Foreign Language: Slush Ice
- Best Documentary: Calvin's Story
- Best Webisodic/New Media: Open Mic
- Best Experimental: Delicatessen
- Best Young Filmmaker: Recess
- Best Horror: Ding Dong
- Audience Choice Awards:
  - To Those With Good Intent
  - Rockabye
  - Sputnik
  - Tinder is the Night
  - Tracker

=== 2018 ===
Festival dates: November 9–10

==== Winners ====
- Best Short Film: Sac de Merde
- Best Animation: Ian
- Best Drama: Tin Can
- Best Documentary: Scenes From A Visit
- Best Music Video: It's The Dystopian Future!
- Best Comedy: William Flugle's Travel Adventures with William Flugle
- Best Web Series: Geek Lounge
- Spotlight Award: Heather Has Four Moms
- Programmers Choice: Leia's Army
- Best SciFi: The Replacement
- Audience Choice Awards:
  - Businessmen
  - Tin Can
  - Dear Dark Lord
  - Leia's Army
  - Midnight

=== 2019 ===
The 2019 Chicago International REEL Shorts Festival was help at Chicago Filmmakers' Firehouse Cinema located at 1326 W Hollywood Ave in the city of Chicago.

==== WINNERS ====
BEST SHORT FILM – Minor Accident of War – Jakob Satzaria

SEMI-FINALIST SHORT FILM – Anxiety – Tridib Chakraborty

AUDIENCE CHOICE AWARDS

Pageant Mom, Down Dickie & Bea Ballhawks Just Give Me a Minute to Change The Sweatshirt

Programmers Awards

Best Foreign Rock On, Dude!

Best Drama Broken

Best Animation King of the House

Best Comedy Dickie & Bea

Best Musical Short The Odyssey of Cleve Eaton

Best Documentary Uncaged: A Stand-In Story

Best Horror Keep Looking

Best Action Vicarious

Best Sci-Fi Dissidence (2084)

=== 2020 ===
Festival dates: Streamed online November 14 – December 5

==== Winners ====
- Best of the Fest: 6 Months in 2063
- Best Arts Short: Dear COVID-19
- Best Comedy Short: She Had It Coming
- Best Documentary Short: NINE
- Best Sci-Fi, Action, Horror Short: 6 Months in 2063
- Best Growing Up, Growing Older Short: Miracle of Science
- Best Drama Short Film: Glimmer
- Honorable Mention & Judges Selections:
  - Superhero Me
  - Carny Trash
  - Nameless Forest
  - The Bottle

=== 2021 ===
The 18th edition of the Chicago International REEL Shorts Festival was originally scheduled for November 2021 but was postponed due to COVID-19. The festival returned to Chicago Filmmakers' Firehouse Cinema for in-person screenings on March 18–19, 2022.
