= Jimmy Johnston (American football) =

American football player (1917–1973)

No. 31
- Positions: Defensive back, End, Running back

Personal information
- Born: April 16, 1917; Parma, Idaho, U.S.
- Died: November 27, 1973 (aged 56); Caldwell, Idaho, U.S.
- Listed height: 6 ft 1 in (1.85 m)
- Listed weight: 193 lb (88 kg)

Career information
- High school: Caldwell
- College: Washington (1935-1938)
- NFL draft: 1939: 10th round, 88th overall pick

Career history
- Washington Redskins (1939–1940); Chicago Cardinals (1946)

Awards and highlights
- Second-team All-PCC (1938)

Career NFL statistics
- Rushing yards: 321
- Rushing average: 3.2
- Receptions: 40
- Receiving yards: 461
- Interceptions: 2
- Total touchdowns: 8
- Stats at Pro Football Reference

James Everett Johnston (April 16, 1917 – November 17, 1973) was an American professional football player who played professionally in the National Football League (NFL) for the Washington Redskins and the Chicago Cardinals. Born in Parma, Idaho, he played high school football at Caldwell and college football at the University of Washington in Seattle. Johnston was selected in the tenth round of the 1939 NFL draft by the Redskins with the 88th overall pick.
