= Caldwell High School (Idaho) =

Location
- 3401 S. Indiana Ave. Caldwell, Idaho; United States; 43°38′24″N 116°40′19″W

Information
- Type: Public
- Established: 1910, 1956 (current)
- School district: Caldwell S.D. (#132)
- Principal: Chantel Kelly
- Teaching staff: 65.30 (FTE)
- Grades: 9–12
- Enrollment: 1,400 (2024–2025)
- Student to teacher ratio: 21.44
- Colors: Blue, White, & Gold
- Athletics: IHSAA Class 4A
- Athletics conference: Southern Idaho (4A) (SIC)
- Mascot: Cougar
- Rivals: Vallivue, Nampa
- Yearbook: Cougar
- Feeder schools: Jefferson Middle School; Syringa Middle School
- Website: Caldwell High School

Caldwell High School four-year public secondary school in Caldwell, Idaho, the only traditional high school in the Caldwell School District #132. The building is on South Indiana Avenue near the corner of Ustick Road, across from the local YMCA. The school colors are blue, white, and gold and the mascot is a cougar.

== Athletics ==
Caldwell competes in athletics in IHSAA Class 5A in the Southern Idaho Conference (5A). Caldwell previously competed with the largest schools in the state in Class 6A (formerly A-1).

=== State titles ===
Boys

- Baseball (1): 1983 (A-1, now 6A) (records not kept by IHSAA, state tourney introduced in 1971)
- Basketball (1): 1967 (5A, now 6A)
- Golf (3): 1975, 1976, 1992 (A, now 6A) (introduced in 1956)
- Track (1): 1933 (one class)
- Soccer (5): 1985 (A-1, now 6A), 2018, 2019, 2022 (4A, now 5A), 2025 (6A)
- Wrestling (2): 2015, 2016 (4A, now 5A) (introduced in 1958)

Girls

- Basketball (1): 2001 (4A, now 5A) (introduced in 1976)
- Cross Country (2): 1980, 1981 (individual champion Lucia Wanders) (Class A, now 6A) (introduced in 1974)
- Golf (2): 2003, 2004 (4A, now 5A) (introduced in 1987)

Combined

- Cheerleading (1): 2018 (4A Coed, now 5A Coed)

== Notable graduates ==
- Joe Albertson, founder of Albertson's supermarkets and a notable philanthropist, class of 1925
- Troy Beyer, Actress, author and director, Class of 1982
- Paul Revere Dick, professionally known as Paul Revere, entrepreneur and founder of Paul Revere & the Raiders, class of 1956.
- Shirley Englehorn, pro golfer, won 1970 LPGA Championship, class of 1958
- Mike Garman, MLB pitcher, class of 1967
- Jacob Garsez, Baseball coach, class of 2005
- Jimmy Johnston, NFL running back & end, class of 1935
- Dean McAdams, NFL player, class of 1935
- Edward Lodge, former US district judge, class of 1953
- Ray McDonald, NFL running back, class of 1963
- Cody Pickett, NFL and CFL quarterback, class of 1999
- Frank Reberger, MLB pitcher, class of 1962
- Steve Symms, former U.S. Senator, class of 1956
- Randy Trautman, College Football Hall of Fame inductee, CFL defensive lineman, class of 1978
- Mark Weivoda, Professional football player, class of 1999
