= Nampa Public Library =

Public library in Nampa, Idaho, U.S.

Coordinates: 43°34′40″N 116°33′42″W

The Nampa Public Library is located in historic downtown Nampa, Idaho at 215-12th Avenue South. The library is a member of the Lynx! Consortium of libraries in the Treasure Valley. The library offers materials in a variety of formats including books, magazines, audiobooks, CDs, VHS tapes, DVDs, eAudiobooks and a variety of databases. Fourteen Internet computers are available on a first come-first-served basis. Except during holidays or unusual events, the library is open Monday through Saturday and closed on Sunday.

In fiscal year 2006, the library had over 290,000 customer visits, averaging 968 per day, and a collection of over 143,000 items. In 2011, the average customer visits were over 1100 per day. Nampa Public Library employs 17 full-time employees, and 17 part-time employees. 5 staff members hold master's degrees in librarianship.

== History ==
The Nampa Public Library has served the Nampa community in various ways since 1900. Until a building was completed, the Woman's Century Club was instrumental in the operation of a reading room. Between 1900 and 1907, the Woman's Century Club and Nampa City Council worked to develop funding and gather donations of books and furnishings to start the city's first public library. The first paid librarian, Ennis McGee, started work in 1907 with a $25 a month salary, and the doors to the first library opened in March 1908.

The Nampa Public Library was first housed on 2nd Street, but moved in 1966. The new building was donated by First Security Bank, and various community organizations donated to renovate and remodel the building for library purposes. The skylight was restored in 1978.

The checkout process at the Nampa Public Library was computerized in 1980, joining Nampa with the Boise Library and other libraries in the valley in what is now called the Lynx! Consortium. As part of the Nampa Centennial Celebration in 1985, the library expanded to the building next door, doubling our size. Ten years later in 1996, the library provided internet access to patrons for the first time, digitized the catalog, and began to take part in a courier service between the Lynx! Consortium libraries in the valley. Public computing resources and internet connection were expanded when the Bill and Melinda Gates Foundation donated over $40,000 in 2000.

In 2003, the Library Strategic Facilities Plan clearly outlined the need for a new central library building for the City of Nampa and our well over 1,000 patrons per day. The Nampa City Council voted to proceed with the Nampa Development Plan in 2005, providing a devoted funding stream for the new library.

== A New Library for Nampa ==
Prior to February 21, 2015, the library was located at 101 11th Ave. S. On the last day, community members participated in a book brigade between the two buildings, passing approximately 1000 children's books. The new building opened to the public on March 14, 2015. The new building has three floors, 62,000 square feet, and ample space for reading, programs, community events, and private study. It is a part of the larger Library Square Project, which was funded through the Nampa Development Corporation and adds a three-story parking garage and office and retail space to the downtown neighborhood. Groundbreaking for Library Square took place on May 7, 2013, with large support from children, library users, and local dignitaries. In September 2014 the library announced a grand opening date in January 2015, but this date had to be reconsidered.

Fundraising for library fixtures, furnishings, and technology is ongoing.

One feature of the new building over the old building is the artwork throughout. The feature wall is three stories. There is a hanging sculpture in the lobby. Historic photos grace the walls of the board room. Artwork throughout the new building was funded by donations.

== Controversy ==
In May 2006, community members protested seven books based on content, the Library Board voted to retain all seven books. The book The Joy of Gay Sex was often the book brought up as the reason.

In March 2008, the Nampa Library Board of Trustees ruled in favor of removing two books containing sexual content. The Joy of Sex and The Joy of Gay Sex were removed from the shelves at the library and were only available upon request in the library director's office. One Board member resigned as a result of public backlash to the decision.

In September 2008, The Joy of Sex and The Joy of Gay Sex were restored to the shelves of the Nampa Public Library in an effort to avoid a potential lawsuit. The Library Board voted unanimously to rescind its policy decision "as a matter of fiscal responsibility," board member Kim Keller said. The vote came after Nampa City Attorney Terry White told the board it could cost hundreds of thousands of dollars to litigate a First Amendment lawsuit.
