= Nampa, Idaho =

Nampa
- City
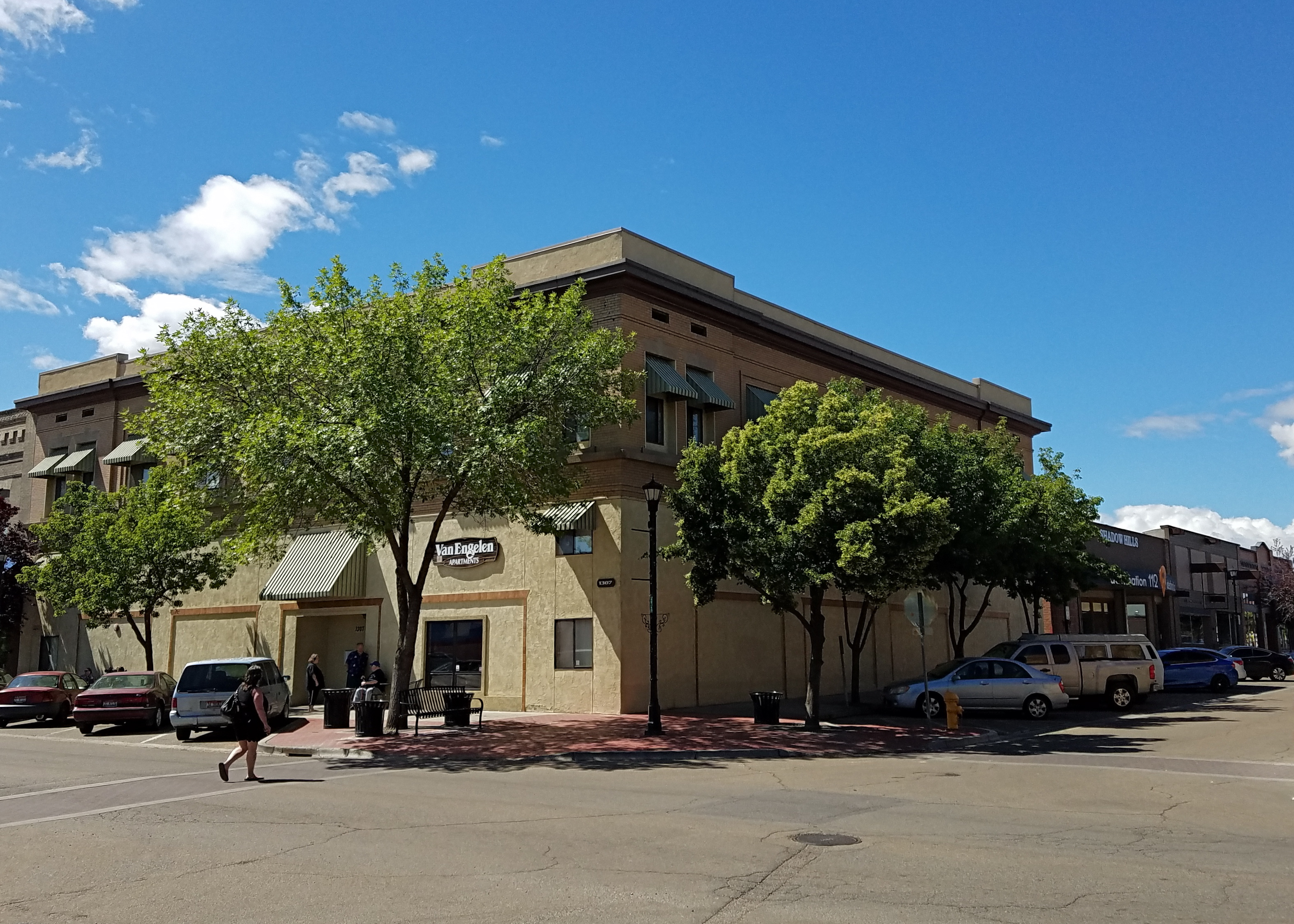
- The former Nampa Department Store in Downtown Nampa
- Nickname: The Heart of the Treasure Valley
- Motto(s): A safe and healthy community where people prosper
- Location of Nampa in Canyon County, Idaho
- Coordinates: 43°36′05″N 116°31′40″W
- Country: United States
- State: Idaho
- County: Canyon
- Founded: September 8, 1886
- Incorporated: April 17, 1891

Government
  - Mayor: David Bills (Interim)

Area
  - City: 34.77 sq mi (90.06 km^{2})
  - Land: 33.48 sq mi (86.72 km^{2})
  - Water: 0.15 sq mi (0.39 km^{2})
- Elevation: 2,474 ft (754 m)

Population (2020)
  - City: 100,200
  - Estimate (2022): 110,951
  - Rank: US: 279th ID: 3rd
  - Density: 2,993/sq mi (1,155.5/km^{2})
  - Urban: 177,561 (US: 203rd)
  - Metro: 811,336 (US: 75th)
  - Combined: 899,574 (US: 67th)
- Time zone: UTC–7 (Mountain (MST))
  - Summer (DST): UTC–6 (MDT)
- ZIP Codes: 83651, 83653, 83686, 83687
- Area codes: 208 and 986
- FIPS code: 16-56260
- GNIS feature ID: 2411208
- Website: www.cityofnampa.us

Nampa (/ˈnæmpə/) is the most populous city in Canyon County, Idaho, United States. The population was 100,200 at the 2020 census. It is Idaho's third-most populous city. Nampa is about 20 miles (32 km) west of Boise along Interstate 84, and 6 miles (9.7 km) west of Meridian. It is the second principal city of the Boise metropolitan area. The name "Nampa" may have come from a Shoshoni word meaning 'moccasin' or 'footprint'. According to toponymist William O. Bright, the name comes from the Shoshoni word /nampai/, meaning "foot". The city has a prominent student population, home to the College of Western Idaho and Northwest Nazarene University.

== History ==
Nampa had its beginnings in the early 1880s when the Oregon Short Line Railroad built a line from Granger, Wyoming, to Huntington, Oregon, that passed through Nampa. In Nampa there is a history museum that marks the railroad's significance. More railroad lines sprang up through Nampa, making it an important railroad town. Alexander and Hannah Duffes established one of the town's first homesteads, eventually forming the Nampa Land and Improvement Company with the help of their friend and co-founder, James McGee. Despite the name, many early settlers called the town "New Jerusalem" because of its citizens' strong religious focus. After only a year the town grew from 15 homes to 50. As amenities were added, Nampa continued to grow, and it was incorporated in 1891.

Downtown Nampa's street grid is oriented with the railroad tracks, which run northwest–southeast; this was done intentionally by Alexander Duffes to prevent accidents like one that occurred earlier in a town he had platted near Toronto, where a woman and her two children were killed by a train when their buggy wheel got stuck as they crossed the tracks. As the Oregon Short Line railroad originally bypassed Boise, Nampa has the fanciest of many railroad depots built in the area.

Nampa gained attention in 1889 due to a purported archaeological discovery known as the Nampa figurine. George Frederick Wright wrote up details that year for the Boston Society of Natural History.

The first elementary school was built in the 1890s. Lakeview School was on a hill on 6th Street and 12th Avenue North, with a view of Lake Ethel. Just after the school's centennial celebration, it was condemned as a school and sold to the First Mennonite Church. In 2008 the building was refurbished, and it is now used by the Idaho Arts Charter School.

Lake Ethel, an irrigation reservoir, had long been the site of community picnics, and many citizens fished, swam, boated, and even hunted on it and its surrounding property. But the hunting didn't last long, as O. F. Persons, owner of the adjoining homestead, took offense when local hunters started shooting his pet ducks.

The city later auctioned off the lake. E. H. Dewey (a former Nampa mayor) was the only bidder. But occasional flooding led to a series of lawsuits from neighbors. Dewey eventually drained Lake Ethel. Not long after, the city council became interested in buying back the Fritz Miller property as well as the Dewey home. Pressure had been building for more than four years. Nampa citizens wanted another park. On August 7, 1924, the city council passed an ordinance to purchase the Miller property and name it Lakeview Park. A bandstand was completed in 1928, and the municipal swimming pool opened on August 13, 1934. It is Nampa's largest park and many community celebrations are held there.

Colonel William H. Dewey, a man who made a fortune mining in Silver City, built the Dewey Palace Hotel in 1902 for $250,000. He died in his hotel in 1903, leaving his son $1 million. The hotel survived the great fire of 1909, which burned several blocks of downtown Nampa, but was razed in 1963 after redevelopment plans failed. Relics from the hotel such as the chandelier and the hotel safe can be found at the Canyon County Historical Museum, which is in the old train depot on Front Street and Nampa City Hall. After demolition the location on First Street between 11th and 12th Ave. South was sold to private enterprise, including a bank and tire store, replacing this building with modern structures. A public-use postage stamp sized park was later placed across the street from the old palace property as a collaboration between the Downtown Alliance of Nampa (the local business council) and an Eagle Scout Project for the Boy Scouts of America. The park includes a large mural/wall sculpture of running horses commissioned for the project.

A Carnegie library was built downtown in 1908; it burned down after the library moved in 1966. Nampa Public Library was then on the corner of 1st Street and 11th Avenue South in the old bank building. A new library, on 12th Avenue South, opened in 2015.

Deer Flat Reservoir, an offstream irrigation storage reservoir, was constructed by the United States Bureau of Reclamation between 1906 and 1911. Known locally as Lake Lowell, it is surrounded by the Deer Flat National Wildlife Refuge, established in 1909 by President Theodore Roosevelt. The refuge is administered by the U.S. Fish and Wildlife Service. Lake Lowell is filled by the concrete New York Canal; the water is diverted from the Boise River a few miles below Lucky Peak Dam.

In 1910, the Idaho State School and Hospital was built northwest of Nampa for the state's developmentally challenged population. It opened in 1918. The institution was largely self-sufficient, with a large farm staffed by the residents. The higher-functioning residents also cared for residents who could not care for themselves. The land for the farm was sold and is now golf courses (Centennial and Ridgecrest), and the residents no longer give primary care to other residents. The institution is modernized and remains in operation, though a few of the oldest buildings now house juvenile offenders.

Nampa held an annual harvest festival and farmers' market from about 1908, a time of celebration and community fun. From this festival emerged the Snake River Stampede Rodeo in 1937, which continues to this day. It is one of the top 12 rodeos in the pro rodeo circuits.

In 1913, a local congregation of the Church of the Nazarene built a small elementary school, which became to Northwest Nazarene College in 1915 and finally Northwest Nazarene University. As of 2025, the university has approximately 1,800 undergraduate and graduate students.

Karcher Mall opened in 1965, the first enclosed shopping mall in the Treasure Valley. It was "the place to gather" for several decades until the Boise Towne Square mall was built in Boise in 1988, drawing business away. Karcher Mall was renamed District 208 in 2022.

The Idaho Press-Tribune is the local newspaper for the Canyon County area.

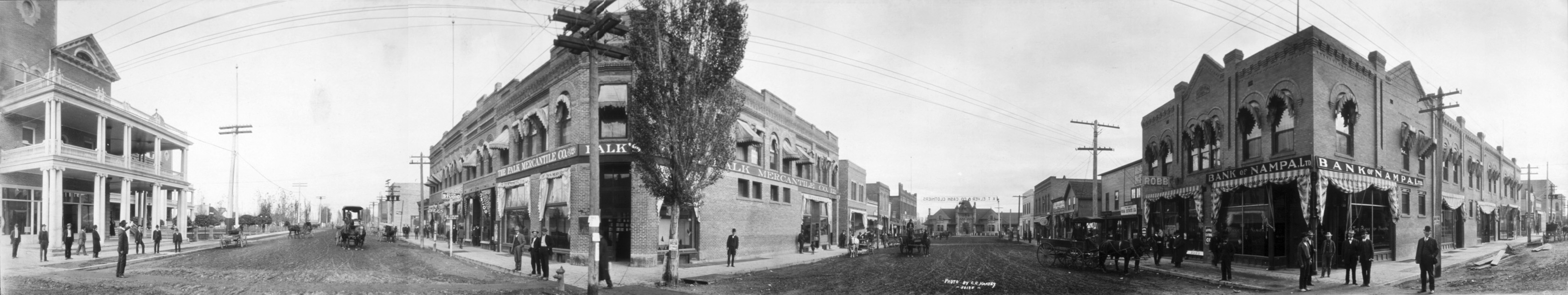
Nampa in 1907

=== Mayors ===
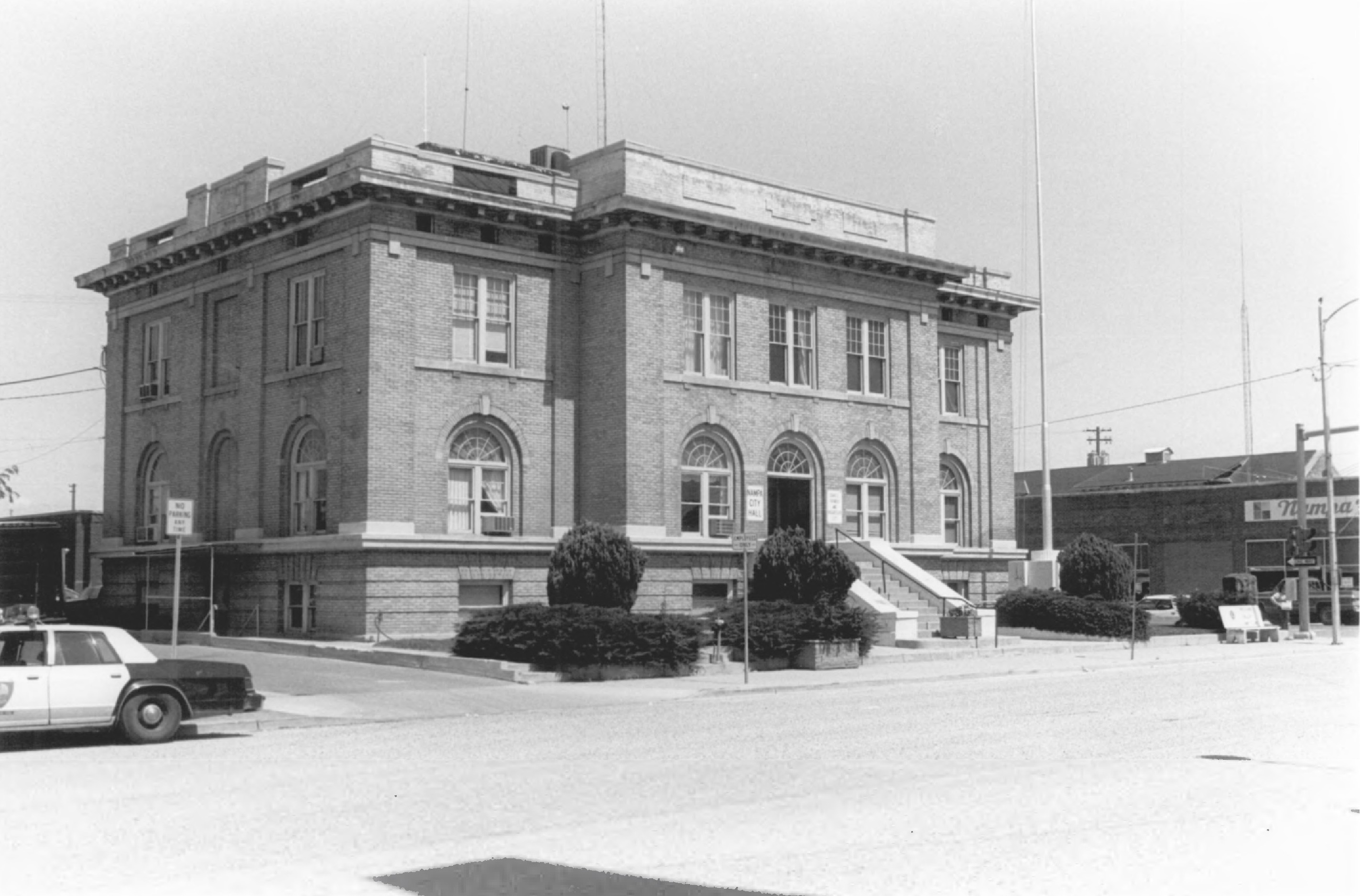
Former city hall building in Nampa, Idaho; built in 1910, razed in 1991 (photo 1982)

The mayors of Nampa have been:

- W. J. McClelland, c.1901–1903
- Frank H. Sutherland, c.1903–1904
- H. A. Partridge, c.1904–1905, 1907–1908, 1913–1914
- Rudolphus W. Purdum, c.1905–1906
- E. H. Dewey, c.1909–1911
- T. E. Munhall, c.1915–1917
- Robert A. Davis, c.1917–1919
- H. H. Keim, c.1919–1920
- J. Fremont Bow, 1921–1923
- Eugene Emerson, c.1923–1925
- George Meffan, 1925–1929
- Eustace Smallwood, c.1929–1930
- E. W. Rising, c.1933–1935
- George I. Van Name, 1935–1937
- R. Lewis Ord, 1937–1939
- Ben H. Waigand, 1939–1943
- A. E. Lindsey, c.1943–1945
- Sevren G. Honstead, 1945–1947
- Peter Johnson, 1947–1951
- Preston Capell, c.1951–1957
- Thomas Leupp, 1957–1961
- Ernest Starr, 1961–1981
- Winston K. Goering, 1981–1993
- Maxine Horn, c.2001
- Tom Dale, c.2002–2013
- Bob Henry, c.2014–2017
- Debbie Kling, 2018–2025
- Rick Hogaboam, 2026 (Note: Died while in office, March 18, 2026.)

== Geography ==
According to the United States Census Bureau, the city has an area of 31.34 square miles (81.17 km^{2}), of which, 31.19 square miles (80.78 km^{2}) is land and 0.15 square miles (0.39 km^{2}) is water.

Climate data for Nampa, Idaho
| Month | Jan | Feb | Mar | Apr | May | Jun | Jul | Aug | Sep | Oct | Nov | Dec | Year |
|---|---|---|---|---|---|---|---|---|---|---|---|---|---|
| Record high °F (°C) | 60 (16) | 70 (21) | 81 (27) | 93 (34) | 100 (38) | 103 (39) | 109 (43) | 107 (42) | 101 (38) | 94 (34) | 74 (23) | 65 (18) | 109 (43) |
| Mean daily maximum °F (°C) | 37 (3) | 45 (7) | 55 (13) | 64 (18) | 73 (23) | 82 (28) | 91 (33) | 89 (32) | 79 (26) | 66 (19) | 49 (9) | 39 (4) | 64 (18) |
| Mean daily minimum °F (°C) | 21 (−6) | 26 (−3) | 31 (−1) | 36 (2) | 44 (7) | 51 (11) | 56 (13) | 54 (12) | 45 (7) | 36 (2) | 28 (−2) | 21 (−6) | 37 (3) |
| Record low °F (°C) | −20 (−29) | −21 (−29) | 13 (−11) | 20 (−7) | 26 (−3) | 33 (1) | 38 (3) | 36 (2) | 28 (−2) | 15 (−9) | −3 (−19) | −26 (−32) | −26 (−32) |
| Average precipitation inches (mm) | 1.37 (35) | 1.14 (29) | 1.35 (34) | 1.12 (28) | 1.22 (31) | 0.63 (16) | 0.32 (8.1) | 0.24 (6.1) | 0.58 (15) | 0.72 (18) | 1.28 (33) | 1.40 (36) | 11.37 (289) |

== Demographics ==
Historical population
| Census | Pop. | Note | %± |
|---|---|---|---|
| 1890 | 347 | | — |
| 1900 | 799 | | 130.3% |
| 1910 | 4,205 | | 426.3% |
| 1920 | 7,621 | | 81.2% |
| 1930 | 8,206 | | 7.7% |
| 1940 | 12,149 | | 48.1% |
| 1950 | 16,185 | | 33.2% |
| 1960 | 18,013 | | 11.3% |
| 1970 | 20,768 | | 15.3% |
| 1980 | 25,112 | | 20.9% |
| 1990 | 28,365 | | 13.0% |
| 2000 | 51,867 | | 82.9% |
| 2010 | 81,557 | | 57.2% |
| 2020 | 100,200 | | 22.9% |
| 2025 (est.) | 120,384 | | 20.1% |
U.S. Decennial Census; 2020 Census

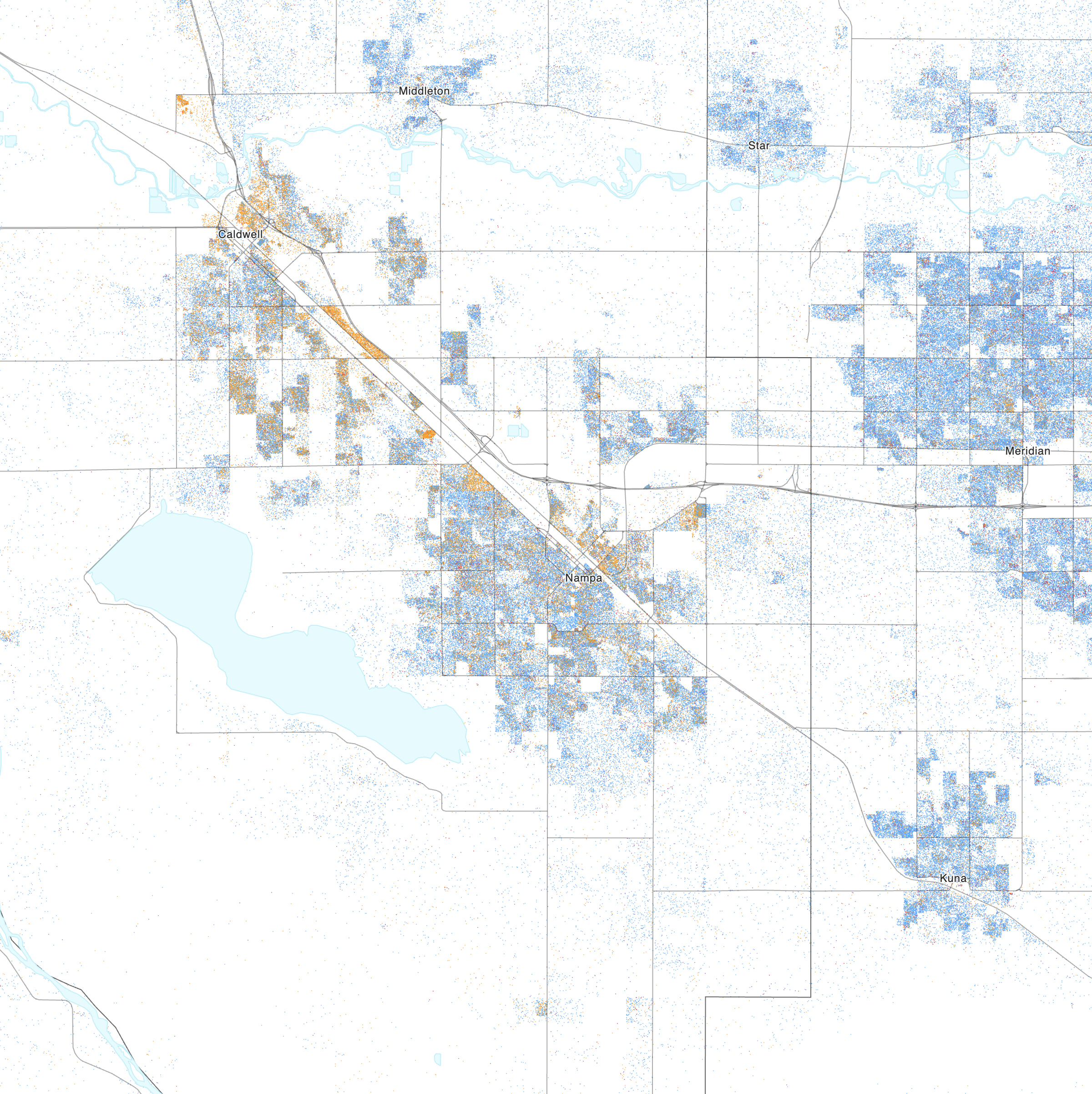
Map of racial distribution in Nampa, 2020 U.S. census. Each dot is one person: ⬤ White ⬤ Black ⬤ Asian ⬤ Hispanic ⬤ Multiracial ⬤ Native American/Other

=== 2020 census ===
As of the census of 2020, there were 100,200 people. The population density was 2,992.7 inhabitants per square mile. The racial makeup of the city was 81.2% White, 0.6% Black or African American alone, 1.0% American Indian or Alaskan Native alone, 0.9% Asian alone, 0.4% Native Hawaiian or Pacific Islander alone, 5.6% two or more races, 24.8% Hispanic or Latino. 69.6% of people identified as White alone, not Hispanic or Latino. The median age was 33 years old. 6.6% of residents were under 5 years of age, 25.8% were under 18 years, 14.6% were over 65 years, and 49.8% were female.

Nampa, Idaho – Racial and ethnic composition Note: the US Census treats Hispanic/Latino as an ethnic category. This table excludes Latinos from the racial categories and assigns them to a separate category. Hispanics/Latinos may be of any race.
| Race / Ethnicity (NH = Non-Hispanic) | Pop 2000 | Pop 2010 | Pop 2020 | % 2000 | % 2010 | % 2020 |
|---|---|---|---|---|---|---|
| White alone (NH) | 40,555 | 59,291 | 67,229 | 78.19% | 72.70% | 67.09% |
| Black or African American alone (NH) | 173 | 500 | 810 | 0.33% | 0.61% | 0.81% |
| Native American or Alaska Native alone (NH) | 365 | 552 | 506 | 0.70% | 0.68% | 0.50% |
| Asian alone (NH) | 455 | 671 | 1,031 | 0.88% | 0.82% | 1.03% |
| Pacific Islander alone (NH) | 89 | 270 | 426 | 0.17% | 0.33% | 0.43% |
| Other race alone (NH) | 62 | 114 | 475 | 0.12% | 0.14% | 0.47% |
| Mixed race or Multiracial (NH) | 886 | 1,506 | 4,394 | 1.71% | 1.85% | 4.39% |
| Hispanic or Latino (any race) | 9,282 | 18,653 | 25,329 | 17.90% | 22.87% | 25.28% |
| Total | 51,867 | 81,557 | 100,200 | 100.00% | 100.00% | 100.00% |

==== Households ====
There were 34,164 households, with 2.78 persons per households in the city. The owner-occupies housing rate was 66.3% and the median value of an owner-occupied unit was $191,800. 78.4% lived in the same household as of a year ago. In 17.6% of households, language other than English was spoken at home.

==== Educational attainment ====
87.2% of people were high school graduates (diploma or equivalent), 4.9% of people had less than a 9th grade education and 7.9% had a 9th-12th grade education with no diploma. 19.9% had a bachelor's degree, and 5.9% had a graduate or professional degree.

The percentage of people who graduated high school (diploma or equivalent) by racial makeup: 91% White, 94.9% Black, 75.2% American Indian or Alaska Native, 75.6% Asian, 88.1% Native Hawaiian or Pacific Islander, 91.3% Two or more races, and 66.7% Hispanic or Latino Origin.

21.2% of people with less than a high school diploma (or equivalent) lived in poverty. 12.6% of high school graduates lived in poverty, and 4.0% of bachelor's degree holders lived in poverty.

==== Income, employment, business, and health ====
Household 12-month income was $53,205 and per capita income was $22,422. 63.5% of residents were in the workforce (age 16 and above). 57.0% of the female population were in the civilian workforce (age 16 and above). 13.9% of residents lived in poverty. The mean travel time to work (commute) was 23.4 minutes. As of 2017, there were 1,833 businesses with 939 being owned by men and 212 owned by women.

11.4% of people had a disability and 13.8% of people under the age of 65 did not have health insurance.

=== 2010 census ===
As of the census of 2010, there were 81,557 people, 27,729 households, and 20,016 families living in the city. The population density was 2,614.8 inhabitants per square mile (1,009.6/km^{2}). There were 30,507 housing units at an average density of 978.1 per square mile (377.6/km^{2}). The racial makeup of the city was 82.9% White, 0.7% African American, 1.2% Native American, 0.9% Asian, 0.4% Pacific Islander, 10.7% from other races, and 3.2% from two or more races. Hispanic or Latino of any race were 22.9% of the population.

There were 27,729 households, of which 44.0% had children under the age of 18 living with them, 52.7% were married couples living together, 13.5% had a female householder with no husband present, 5.9% had a male householder with no wife present, and 27.8% were non-families. 22.0% of all households were made up of individuals, and 8.7% had someone living alone who was 65 years of age or older. The average household size was 2.88 and the average family size was 3.36.

The median age in the city was 30.1 years. 32.3% of residents were under the age of 18; 9.8% were between the ages of 18 and 24; 28.6% were from 25 to 44; 18.8% were from 45 to 64; and 10.3% were 65 years of age or older. The city's gender makeup was 49.0% male and 51.0% female.

=== 2000 census ===
As of the census of 2000, there were 51,867 people, 18,090 households, and 13,024 families living in the city. The population density was 2,612.3 inhabitants per square mile (1,008.6/km^{2}). There were 19,379 housing units at an average density of 976.0 per square mile (376.8/km^{2}). The city's racial makeup was 83.45% White, 0.40% African American, 0.94% Native American, 0.93% Asian, 0.18% Pacific Islander, 11.25% from other races, and 2.86% from two or more races. Hispanic or Latino of any race were 17.90% of the population.

There were 18,090 households, of which 40.6% had children under the age of 18 living with them, 55.6% were married couples living together, 11.4% had a female householder with no husband present, and 28.0% were non-families. 22.6% of all households were made up of individuals, and 9.6% had someone living alone who was 65 years of age or older. The average household size was 2.77 and the average family size was 3.25.

The city's population was spread out, with 31.0% under the age of 18, 12.5% from 18 to 24, 30.3% from 25 to 44, 15.0% from 45 to 64, and 11.2% who were 65 years of age or older. The median age was 28 years. For every 100 females, there were 96.0 males. For every 100 females age 18 and over, there were 93.0 males.

The city's median household income was $34,758, and the median family income was $39,434. Males had a median income of $28,580 versus $22,022 for females. The city's per capita income was $14,491. About 8.7% of families and 12.4% of the population were below the poverty line, including 13.7% of those under age 18 and 9.9% of those age 65 or over.

== Arts and culture ==
=== Ford Idaho Center ===
The Ford Idaho Center is a unique complex of entertainment venues currently managed by Oak View Group. Venues include a 10,500-capacity amphitheater built in 1998 that features a 60-by-40-foot stage; a 12,279-seat arena featuring 31,200 square feet (2,900 m^{2}) of arena floor space; the Idaho Horse Park, used for horse shows; and the Sports Center, used for indoor horse shows in the summer, and track and field events. The Ford Idaho Center hosts the Snake River Stampede Rodeo, Monster Jam, music concerts, trade shows, sporting events, and other events.

=== Brandt Center ===
Northwest Nazarene University's Brandt Center has a 1,500-seat auditorium, two art galleries, multiple meeting spaces, and a 9,000 square-foot lobby. Art, music, dance, theater, speakers, and other events are hosted here.

=== Civic Center ===
The Nampa Civic Center hosts theater, music, films, and other events. It includes the 640-seat John Brandt Performing Arts Theater.

=== Idaho Hispanic Community Center (IH2C) ===
In 2003, the Hispanic Cultural Center of Idaho (HCCI) opened thanks to community support. It has recently transitioned back to the City of Nampa and was renamed the Idaho Hispanic Community Center (IH2C) and is home to the Idaho Hispanic Foundation. It hosts events, classes, and festivals, including Día de los Muertos, Hispanic Heritage Month, and Día Internacional de la Mujer. It serves as a meeting place for associations and groups. Displays of cultural history are available to the public.

=== Nampa Train Depot Museum ===
The Nampa Train Depot Museum is a historical depot with displays and archives of the area's railroad and cultural history. The Canyon County Historical Society saved the depot from demolition in 1972.

=== Annual Festival of the Arts ===
Nampa's Festival of the Arts, which began in 1987, is held in Lakeview Park every year and includes local art, music, dance, and food.

=== Warhawk Air Museum ===
The Warhawk Air Museum was established in 1986 and relocated to Nampa in 2001. The museum displays aircraft and veterans' history. The collection includes a P-51C Mustang, P-40N Warhawk, F-86F Sabre Jet, N3N, Fokker DR-1, UH-1C Huey, L-19 Bird Dog, MiG-17, MiG-21, F-104 Starfighter, and a F9F Panther Jet.

== Parks and recreation ==
Nampa has 27 parks and 14 miles of pedestrian pathways.

Lakeview Park is the largest (44 acres) and includes a public swimming pool, 1,000-seat amphitheater, baseball/softball fields, BMX track, rose garden, basketball courts, playground, duck pond, sand volleyball court, horseshoe pits, and water wise garden. Historic displays at the park include a Northrop F-89B Scorpion fighter jet, M-60 Tank, and a Union Pacific Engine No. 616, a class 2-8-0 locomotive.

The Nampa Recreation Center, a 140,000-square-foot (13,000 m^{2}) facility with a six-pool aquatic center, three gymnasiums, racquetball courts, indoor walking/running track, a weight room and exercise equipment, a climbing wall, and other activity areas, opened in 1994. The Nampa Recreation Center was later renamed the Harward Recreation Center.

The City of Nampa owns and operates the Centennial Golf Course (18 holes) and Ridgecrest Golf Club (27 holes). The city also owns and operates the Kohlerlawn-Cemetery.

Wilson Springs is a 55-acre nature area that includes trails and fishing ponds serviced by Idaho Fish and Game and Canyon County Parks.

== Government ==
The City of Nampa is governed by a full-time mayor and a six-member part-time city council. Each city council member represents a different district within the city. All seven of these positions are elected to a term of four years, with city elections occurring every two years on a staggered schedule.

The duties of the Mayor's office are being handled on an interim basis by City Council President David Bills, following the sudden death of Mayor Rick Hogaboam on March 18, 2026. The appointment of a new mayor by the City Council is pending as of March 2026.

Nampa City Council members are Debbie Skaug (District 1, elected 2025), Natalie Jangula (District 2, elected 2023), David Bills (District 3, appointed to fill vacancy 2024 and elected 2025), Dale Reynolds (District 4, elected 2023, appointed 2022), Victor Rodriguez (District 5, elected 2025) and Sebastian Griffin (District 6, elected 2023).

The residents of Nampa voted to increase the size of their council from four to six members in 2013.

Prior to 2020, Nampa's city council members were elected at-large. A state legislative change that year required that cities over 100,000 residents begin electing their council based on district.

== Education ==
=== K-12 ===
The Nampa School District, which covers the majority of the city, includes ten elementary schools, three middle schools, and three high schools, and one alternative high school that serves students who struggle in traditional high schools. The high schools include Nampa High School (the original and oldest), Skyview High School, Columbia High School, and Union High School.

Vallivue School District is partly in Nampa and partly in Caldwell. It has seven elementary schools, two middle schools, and two high schools (one in Nampa: Ridgevue High School).

A few blocks of Nampa are in West Ada School District (Meridian Joint School District 2).

=== Post-secondary ===
College of Western Idaho (CWI) is a public, 2-year community college offering associate degrees and Technical Certificates. It was established in 2007. The college is accredited by the Northwest Commission on Colleges and Universities (NWCCU) and serves approximately 10,000 students.

Northwest Nazarene University (NNU) is a private Christian university located in Nampa. It was originally established in 1913 as a grade school and Bible school and became a four-year degree institution in 1937. It is accredited by the Northwest Commission on Colleges and Universities and serves about 2,000 students.

== Infrastructure ==
=== Transportation ===
Major thoroughfares include Interstate 84, which has four exits into Nampa, State Highway 55, and State Highway 45. Principal roads include the Nampa-Caldwell Boulevard (which connects Nampa with Caldwell), 12th Avenue Road, 16th Avenue, and Garrity Boulevard. The Union Pacific Northwest Corridor railroad line, connecting Salt Lake City and points east with the Pacific Northwest, runs through Nampa. Public bus transportation includes several bus lines operated by ValleyRide. Private bus transportation includes a single Greyhound bus stop. The Nampa Municipal Airport is used for general aviation.

== Notable people ==
- George L. Bartlett, U.S. Marine Corps Brigadier general and veteran of three wars
- Ronee Blakley, actress, singer-songwriter, known for her role in Nashville
- Bud Clark, mayor of Portland, Oregon
- Dolores Crow (1931–2018), politician and legislator lived in Nampa and represented its district
- Adam Drucker (born 1977), rapper better known by his stage name Doseone, born in Nampa
- Henry Hajimu Fujii, farmer, Japanese-American spokesman, lapidary
- Davey Hamilton, race car driver, competed in Indianapolis 500
- Larry Jackson, Major League Baseball pitcher (1955–68)
- Mark Lindsay, lead vocalist of rock band Paul Revere and the Raiders
- Zack Lively, actor
- Sean McMeekin, historian
- Rob Morris, former NFL linebacker for Indianapolis Colts
- Don Mossi, Major League Baseball pitcher for several teams
- Gracie Pfost, former U.S. representative; first woman to represent Idaho in Congress
- Jake Pitts, musician. guitar player, Black Veil Brides
- Steve Symms, former U.S. senator
- Ted Trueblood, outdoor writer, Idaho conservation leader, editor of Field & Stream magazine
- Edwin P. Wilson (1928–2012), CIA agent convicted of arms trading
- Julie Yamamoto, educator and member of the Idaho House of Representatives

== See also ==
- Amalgamated Sugar Company
