= Idaho Standards Achievement Test =

Idaho state achievement test

The Idaho Standards Achievement Tests (ISAT) is the state achievement test for Idaho It is administered for reading, English language use, and mathematics in grades 3-8 and once in grade 11. Science is additionally assessed in grades 5 and 8. The ISAT is used to monitor goals state, district, and school monitoring. At this time, Idaho does not use these tests for graduation purposes at any level.
