= Jarom Wagoner =

American politician and city planner from Idaho

Mayor of Caldwell
- In office January 4, 2022 – January 5, 2026
- Preceded by: Garrett Nancolas
- Succeeded by: Eric Phillips

Member of the Caldwell City Council
- In office January 6, 2020 – January 2022

Member of the Idaho House of Representatives from District 10, Seat A
- In office November 14, 2017 – November 30, 2020
- Preceded by: Brandon Hixon
- Succeeded by: Julie Yamamoto

Personal details
- Born: Rexburg, Idaho
- Party: Republican
- Spouse: Lisa Wagoner
- Children: 3
- Education: Arizona State University
- Occupation: City planner, politician

Jarom Wagoner was the mayor of Caldwell, Idaho. He was a member of the Caldwell City Council, and a former Republican member of Idaho House of Representatives from District 10, seat A.

== Early life ==
Wagoner was born in Rexburg, Idaho.

== Education ==
Wagoner first attended Brigham Young University–Idaho, and later attended Arizona State University where he earned a degree in business administration, finance, and economics.

== Career ==
In 2005, Wagoner became a city planner for County Development Services, until 2009. In 2009, Wagoner became a Principal Planner for JP Wagoner Planning, until 2010. In 2010, Wagoner became a Planner for Ada County Highway District, until 2013. In July 2013, Wagoner became a senior planner for the City of Caldwell, Idaho.

== Appointment and Elections ==
=== Mayor of Caldwell ===
Wagoner was one of five candidates running for Caldwell, Idaho Mayor in the November 2021 election. Wagoner even though he was the highest vote getting with 47% of the vote, Caldwell requires the mayoral race to win with more than 50% making Wagoner face John McGee on the November 30, 2021 run off election. McGee attempted to drop out and allow Wagnoner to become mayor without a run off election but the city clerk said that the run off election must happen. John McGee did not actively campaign in the run off election. Wagoner defeated McGee with 82.75% of the vote. Mayor Wagoner was unseated by Eric Phillips by 27% of the vote, and with Phillips earning more than 50% in the three-way race.

=== Idaho House of Representatives District 10, Seat A ===
In November 2017, Wagoner was appointed by Idaho Governor Butch Otter to become a Republican member of Idaho House of Representatives for District 10, seat A. Wagnoner replaced Brandon Hixon, who resigned on October 19, 2017 from the Idaho House of Representatives.

==== 2020 ====
Wagoner was defeated by Julie Yamamoto in the Republican primary, gaining only 41.73% of the vote.

==== 2018 ====
Wagoner was unopposed in the Republican primary. Wagoner defeated Democratic nominee Sead Muradbegovic with 63.3% of the vote.

==== 2012 ====
Wagoner challenged Brandon Hixon in the Republican primary, he lost taking only 48.5% of the vote. (85 votes)

== Personal life ==
Wagoner and his wife Lisa reside in Caldwell, Idaho. They have three sons.
