= Brent Crane =

American politician from Idaho

Member of the Idaho House of Representatives from the 13A district
- Incumbent
- Assumed office December 1, 2006
- Preceded by: Dolores Crow

Personal details
- Born: July 2, 1974 (age 52) Nampa, Idaho, U.S.
- Party: Republican
- Relations: Ron Crane (father); Jaron Crane (brother)
- Education: Boise State University (BA)

Brent J. Crane (born July 2, 1974) is an American politician serving as a member of the Idaho House of Representatives for District 13, Seat A. He currently serves as the Chair of the House State Affairs Committee.

== Education ==
Crane graduated from high school at Nampa Christian School and earned his bachelor's degree in political science from Boise State University.

== Elections ==
Crane has expressed interest in running for Idaho's 1st congressional district seat in the future.

=== 2024 ===
Crane was unopposed in the Republican primary. Crane won the general election with 15,206 (71.5%) against Democrat Cliff Hohman.

=== 2022 ===
Crane was unopposed in the Republican primary. Crane won the general election with 9,476 votes (86.2%) against Constitutional Party candidate Petre Danaila.

=== 2020 ===
Crane was unopposed in the Republican primary. Crane won the general election with 15,068 votes (70.0%) against Democrat Jason Kutchma.

=== 2018 ===
Crane was unopposed in the Republican primary and the general election.

=== 2016 ===
Crane was unopposed in the Republican primary and the general election.

Crane supported Ted Cruz in the 2016 Republican Party presidential primaries and introduced him at a Boise State University rally in March 2016.

=== 2014 ===
Crane won the Republican primary with 2,592 votes (74.3%) against Patrick N O'Brien.

Crane was unopposed in the general election.

=== 2012 ===
Crane was unopposed in the Republican primary. Crane defeated Clayton Trehal in the general election with 10,706 votes (67.4%).

=== 2010 ===
Crane was unopposed for Republican primary and the general election.

=== 2008 ===
Crane was unopposed for the Republican primary and the general election.

=== 2006 ===
Republican Representative Dolores Crow retired and left the seat open.

Crane won the Republican primary with 3,296 votes (57.5%) against Jim Barnes.

Crane won the general election with 10,631 votes (68.72%) against Democratic Party nominee Douglas Yarbrough and Libertarian nominee Dennis Weiler.
