= Richard Wills =

Richard Wills may refer to:

- Richard J. Wills Jr (born 1942), retired bishop of the United Methodist Church
- Rich Wills (born 1945), American politician
- Rick Wills (born 1947), British rock musician
- Richard W. Wills (born 1956), Civil Rights pastor
