= Idaho's 10th legislative district =

American legislative district

Idaho's 10th legislative district is one of 35 districts of the Idaho Legislature. It is currently represented in the Senate by Tammy Nichols, a Republican from Caldwell, and by Republicans Julie Yamamoto and Bruce Skaug in the House of Representatives.

== District profile ==
Beginning in December 2022, the District 10 has consisted of portions of Canyon and Ada counties.

== Past district profiles ==
=== 2002–2012 ===
From 2002 to 2012, District 10 consisted of a portion of Canyon County.

Legislature	Session	Senate	House Seat A	House Seat B
57th (2002 - 2004)	1st	Ron McWilliams (R)	Robert Ring (R)	Darrell Bolz (R)
57th (2002 - 2004)	2nd	Ron McWilliams (R)	Robert Ring (R)	Darrell Bolz (R)
58th (2004 - 2006)	1st	John McGee (R)	Robert Ring (R)	Darrell Bolz (R)
58th (2004 - 2006)	2nd	John McGee (R)	Robert Ring (R)	Darrell Bolz (R)
59th (2006 - 2008)	1st	John McGee (R)	Robert Ring (R)	Darrell Bolz (R)
59th (2006 - 2008)	2nd	John McGee (R)	Curtis Bowers (R) (appointed)	Darrell Bolz (R)
60th (2008 - 2010)	1st	John McGee (R)	Pat Takasugi (R)	Darrell Bolz (R)
60th (2008 - 2010)	2nd	John McGee (R)	Pat Takasugi (R)	Darrell Bolz (R)
61st (2010 - 2012)	1st	John McGee (R)	Pat Takasugi (R)	Darrell Bolz (R)
61st (2010 - 2012)	2nd	John McGee (R)	Gayle Batt (R)	Darrell Bolz (R)

=== 2012–2022 ===
District 10 currently consists of a portion of Canyon County, Idaho.

Legislature	Session	Senate	House Seat A	House Seat B
62nd (2012 - 2014)	1st	Jim Rice (R)	Brandon Hixon (R)	Darrell Bolz (R)
62nd (2012 - 2014)	2nd	Jim Rice (R)	Brandon Hixon (R)	Darrell Bolz (R)
63rd (2014 - 2016)	1st	Jim Rice (R)	Brandon Hixon (R)	Gregory Chaney (R)
63rd (2014 - 2016)	2nd	Jim Rice (R)	Brandon Hixon (R)	Gregory Chaney (R)
64th (2016 - 2018)	1st	Jim Rice (R)	Brandon Hixon (R)	Gregory Chaney (R)
64th (2016 - 2018)	2nd	Jim Rice (R)	Jarom Wagoner (R)	Gregory Chaney (R)
65th (2018 - 2020)	1st	Jim Rice (R)	Jarom Wagoner (R)	Gregory Chaney (R)
65th (2018 - 2020)	2nd	Jim Rice (R)	Jarom Wagoner (R)	Gregory Chaney (R)
66th (2020–2022)	1st	Jim Rice (R)	Julie Yamamoto (R)	Gregory Chaney (R)
66th (2020–2022)	2nd	Jim Rice (R)	Julie Yamamoto (R)	Gregory Chaney (R)

=== 1992–2002 ===
From 1992 to 2002, District 10 consisted of a portion of Canyon County.

Legislature	Session	Senate	House Seat A	House Seat B
51st (1992 - 1994)	1st	David Kerrick (R)	Ron Crane (R)	Dorothy Reynolds (R)
51st (1992 - 1994)	2nd	David Kerrick (R)	Ron Crane (R)	Dorothy Reynolds (R)
52nd (1994 - 1996)	1st	David Kerrick (R)	Ron Crane (R)	Dorothy Reynolds (R)
52nd (1994 - 1996)	2nd	David Kerrick (R)	Ron Crane (R)	Dorothy Reynolds (R)
53rd (1996 - 1998)	1st	Darrell Diede (R)	Ron Crane (R)	Dorothy Reynolds (R)
53rd (1996 - 1998)	2nd	Darrell Diede (R)	Ron Crane (R)	Dorothy Reynolds (R)
54th (1998 - 2000)	1st	Darrell Diede (R)	Beverly Montgomery (R)	Dorothy Reynolds (R)
54th (1998 - 2000)	2nd	Darrell Diede (R)	Beverly Montgomery (R)	Dorothy Reynolds (R)
55th (2000 - 2002)	1st	Darrell Diede (R)	Beverly Montgomery (R)	Darrell Bolz (R)
55th (2000 - 2002)	2nd	Darrell Diede (R)	Beverly Montgomery (R)	Darrell Bolz (R)

== See also ==
- List of Idaho senators
- List of Idaho representatives
