= Celia Gould =

American politician from Idaho

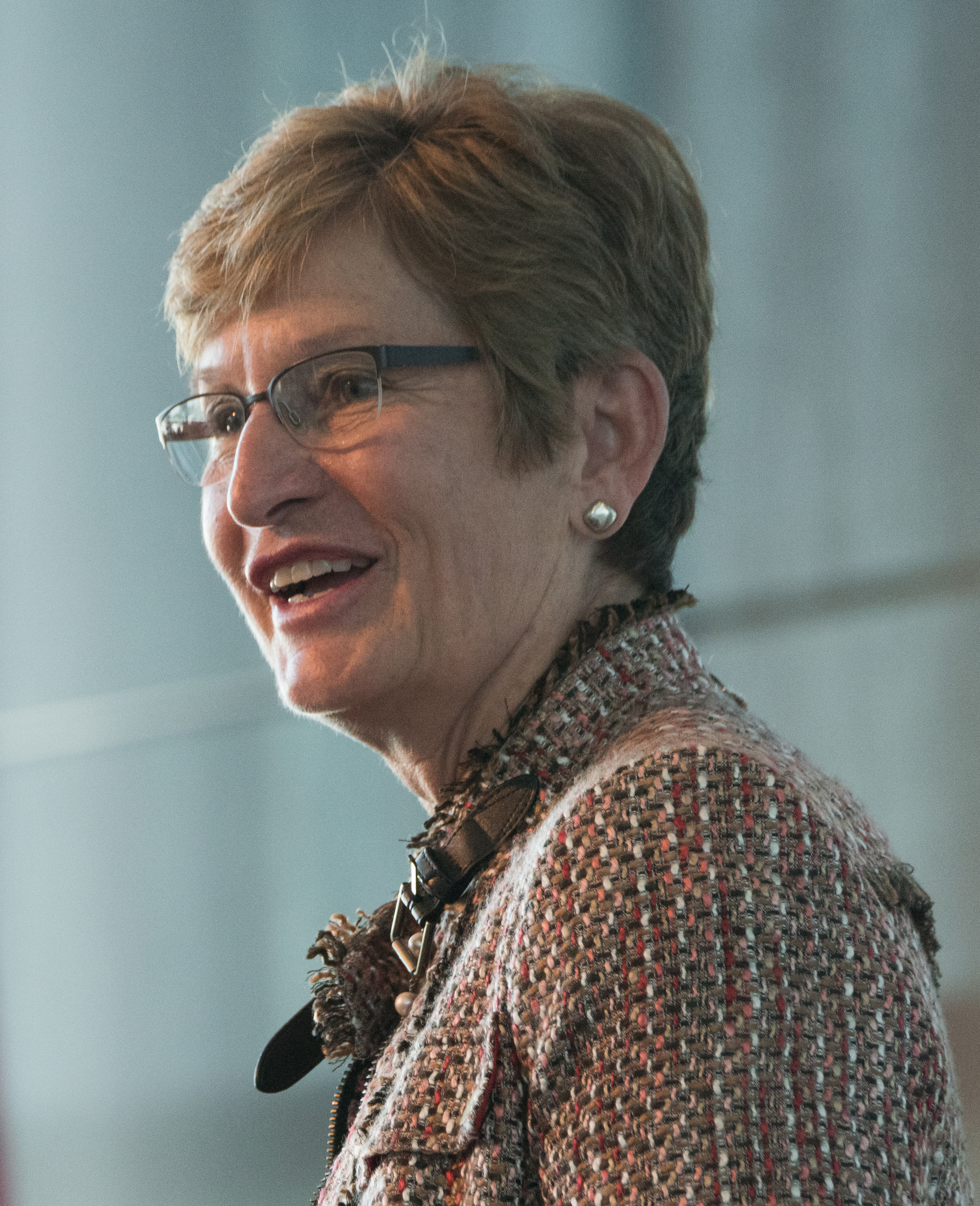
- Gould in 2017

Director of the Idaho Department of Agriculture
- In office January 2, 2007 – January 2, 2023
- Governor: Butch Otter; Brad Little
- Preceded by: Pat Takasugi
- Succeeded by: Chanel Tewalt

Member of the Idaho House of Representatives from the 22A district
- In office December 1, 1986 – November 30, 2002
- Preceded by: Clint Stennett
- Succeeded by: Rich Wills

Personal details
- Born: November 20, 1957 (age 68) Twin Falls, Idaho, U.S.
- Party: Republican
- Children: 6
- Education: Boise State University (BA, MPA)

Celia Gould (born November 20, 1957) is an American businesswoman and politician who served as the director of the Idaho Department of Agriculture from 2007 to 2023.

== Early life and education ==
Gould was born in Twin Falls, Idaho. She grew up on her family's ranch, where she was introduced to agriculture very early. She earned a Bachelor of Arts degree in political science and a Master of Public Administration from Boise State University.

== Career ==
Gould is the third-generation owner/operator of a beef cattle ranching operation, G+ Ranches of Buhl, Idaho. Gould and her husband also have a beef operation in the Declo area.

She previously served in the Idaho House of Representatives from district 22A from 1986 to 2002.

She served on the Agricultural Affairs, Education, and Revenue and Taxation committees, in addition to serving as the Chairman of the Judiciary, Rules and Administration Committee.

In 2007, Gould became the first woman appointed to the Idaho State Department of Agriculture (ISDA) by then-governor Butch Otter. After 16 years in the position, she was replaced by Chanel Tewalt.

== Personal life ==
Her husband is former Speaker of the House Bruce Newcomb. She has five children and ten grandchildren.
