= Ron Crane (politician) =

American politician from Idaho

Treasurer of Idaho
- In office January 4, 1999 – January 7, 2019
- Governor: Phil Batt; Dirk Kempthorne; Jim Risch; Butch Otter
- Preceded by: Lydia Justice Edwards
- Succeeded by: Julie Ellsworth

Member of the Idaho House of Representatives from the 10A district
- In office 1982–1998
- Succeeded by: Beverly Montgomery

Personal details
- Born: November 2, 1948 (age 77) Nampa, Idaho, U.S.
- Party: Republican
- Spouse: Cheryl Crane
- Children: 6, including Jaron Crane and Brent Crane
- Education: Bible Missionary Institute (AA)

Military service
- Allegiance: United States
- Branch/service: United States Army
- Years of service: 1971–1977
- Unit: Idaho National Guard

Ron Crane is an American politician who served as a member of Idaho House of Representatives from 1982 to 1998 and as the state treasurer of Idaho from 1999 to 2019.

== Early life and education ==
Crane was born in Nampa, Idaho, in 1948. He graduated Nampa Christian High School. In 1971, Crane earned an Associate of Arts degree from the Bible Missionary Institute. In 2008, Crane earned an honorary doctorate degree from Ohio Christian University.

== Career ==
From 1971 to 1977, Crane served in the Idaho National Guard.

In 1980, Crane became the owner and operator of Crane Alarm Service, an alarm company in Idaho.

In 1982, Crane was elected to the Idaho House of Representatives. During his tenure, Crane represented the 10A district.

On November 3, 1998, Crane won the election and became the state treasurer of Idaho. Crane defeated Latham Williams with 75.5% of the votes. In January 2018, Crane announced that he would not seek re-election to a sixth term as the state's treasurer in the November 2018 elections. Crane left office in January 2019.

== Electoral history ==
Idaho State Treasurer election, 1998
Party	Candidate	Votes	%
Republican	Ron Crane	258,755	75.5%
Reform	Latham Williams	83,840	24.5%
Total votes		342,595	100.00

Idaho State Treasurer election, 2002
Party	Candidate	Votes	%
Republican	Ron Crane	239,431	61.2%
Democratic	Sally A. Beitia	136 796	35.0%
Libertarian	Sherwin M. Fellen	14,950	3.8%
Total votes		430,072	100.00

Idaho State Treasurer election, 2006
Party	Candidate	Votes	%
Republican	Ron Crane	276 779	64.36%
Democratic	Howard C. Faux	153 293	35.64%
Total votes		430,072	100.00

Idaho State Treasurer election, 2010
Party	Candidate	Votes	%
Republican	Ron Crane	367,260	100&
Total votes		367,260	100.00

Idaho State Treasurer election, 2014
Party	Candidate	Votes	%
Republican	Ron Crane	260,044	61.0%
Democratic	Deborah Silver	166,487	39.0%
Total votes		426,531	100.00

== Awards ==
- 1975 Idaho's Soldier of the Year.
- Guardian of Small Business Award. Presented by National Federation of Independent Business (NFIB).
- Legislative Champion of the Family. Presented by Idaho Family Forum.
- 1998 Friend of Life Award. Presented by Idaho Chooses Life for his leadership in securing a Ban on Partial Abortions in Idaho.
- Vision 2000 Award. Presented by US Small Business Administration.

== Personal life ==
Crane's wife is Cheryl Crane. They have six children. Crane and his family live in Nampa, Idaho. In October 2011, at age 62, Crane underwent a successful triple bypass open heart surgery.

Political offices
Preceded by Lydia Justice Edwards	Treasurer of Idaho; 1999–2019	Succeeded by Julie Ellsworth
