= Pat Takasugi =

American politician

Member of the Idaho House of Representatives from the 10A district
- In office December 1, 2008 – November 6, 2011
- Preceded by: Curtis Bowers
- Succeeded by: Gayle Batt

Director of the Idaho Department of Agriculture
- In office 1996–2006
- Governor: Phil Batt; Dirk Kempthorne; Jim Risch
- Succeeded by: Celia Gould

Personal details
- Born: June 9, 1949 Brigham City, Utah, U.S.
- Died: November 6, 2011 (aged 62) Boise, Idaho, U.S.
- Party: Republican
- Spouse: Suzanne Backe
- Children: 3
- Education: College of Idaho (BA)

Military service
- Allegiance: United States of America
- Branch/service: United States Army
- Years of service: 1971–1976 (Active); 1976–1981 (Reserve)
- Rank: Captain
- Unit: 10th Special Forces Group

Patrick Alan "Pat" Takasugi (June 9, 1949 – November 6, 2011) was an American politician who served as a member of the Idaho House of Representatives for the 10A district from 2008 to 2011.

== Early life and education ==
Takasugi was born in Brigham City, Utah. After graduating from Vallivue High School, he earned a Bachelor of Arts degree in political science from the College of Idaho in 1971.

== Career ==
After graduation, then he enlisted in the United States Army. During his military service, he was assigned to an Airborne unit, the Rangers, and the Special Forces, was elevated to the rank of captain, and he fulfilled his duty actively until 1976 and served as a reservist in additional five years. Returned to Idaho, he ran a farm near Wilder and Homedale, and served as the director of the Idaho Department of Agriculture. Celia Gould, a fellow Republican, succeeded him as director. Takasugi was a George W. Bush delegate to the 2004 Republican National Convention.

== Personal life ==
Takasugi was a Japanese American. He and his wife, Suzanne Backe, had three children.

He died from pseudomyxoma peritonei, a rare form of appendix cancer, while in office. He is buried at the Wilder Cemetery. Senators Mike Crapo and Jim Risch delivered eulogies for him on the Senate floor.
