= Jim Rice (Idaho politician) =

American politician from Idaho

Member of the Idaho Senate from the 10th district
- In office March 1, 2012 – November 30, 2022
- Preceded by: John McGee
- Succeeded by: Tammy Nichols

Personal details
- Party: Republican
- Spouse(s): Tish Rice (?–?); Kim Rice (2019)
- Children: 8
- Education: Brigham Young University; Taft Law School
- Website: Laresen & Rice

Jim Rice is an American attorney and former politician who served as a member of the Idaho Senate from the 10th district until November 2022. He was appointed to the seat in March 2012 by Idaho Governor Butch Otter.

== Education ==
Rice graduated from Melba High School. He attended Brigham Young University and earned his Juris Doctor from Taft Law School.

== Career ==
When Idaho Senator John McGee resigned his seat after allegations of sexual assault, the Legislative District 10 Republican Central Committee met to fill the vacancy in the Senate seat, sending three names in order of preference to Governor Butch Otter: Rice, Brandon Hixon, and Jarom Wagoner, all of whom resided in Caldwell, Idaho. Governor Otter appointed Rice to serve the remainder of McGee's term.

=== Committee assignments ===
- Local Government and Taxation Committee, chair 2019 to 2022
- Transportation Committee from 2012 to 2014, and 2018 to 2022
- Agriculture Affairs Committee from 2012 to 2019, chairman from 2014 to 2019

== Elections ==
District 10 Senate - Part of Canyon County
Year	Candidate	Votes	Pct	Candidate	Votes	Pct
2012 Primary	Jim Rice (incumbent)	1,987	68.8%	Kent Marmon	900	31.2%
2012 General	Jim Rice (incumbent)	7,706	61.2%	Leif Skyving	4,885	38.8%
2014 Primary	Jim Rice (incumbent)	2,088	100.0%			
2014 General	Jim Rice (incumbent)	5,660	68.5%	Micheal DeCoria	2,598	31.5%
2016 Primary	Jim Rice (incumbent)	1,855	100.0%			
2016 General	Jim Rice (incumbent)	9,762	68.3%	Ydalia Yado	4,524	31.7%
