= Senator McGehee =

Senator McGehee may refer to:

- Dan R. McGehee (1883–1962), Mississippi State Senate
- Harvey McGehee (1887–1965), Mississippi State Senate

== See also ==
- Senator McGee (disambiguation)
