= Genevieve Estelle Jones =

American scientific illustrator (1847–1879)

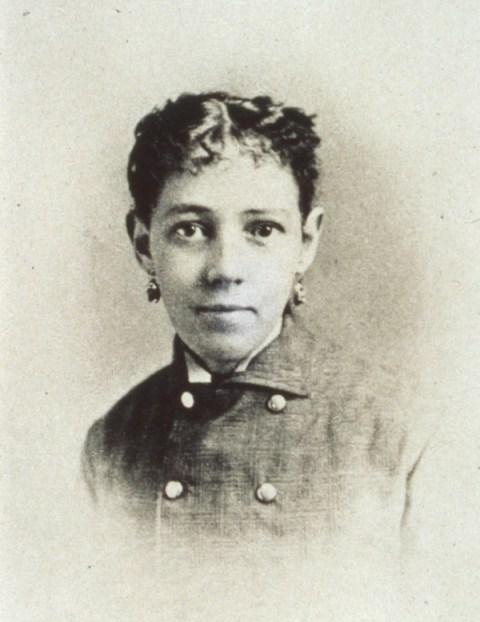
- Born: May 13, 1847; Circleville, Ohio, United States
- Died: August 17, 1879
- Other names: Gennie
- Occupations: Ornithologist; Illustrator
- Notable work: Illustrations of the Nests and Eggs of Birds of Ohio
- Parents: Nelson E. Jones; Virginia Smith Jones

Genevieve Estelle Jones (May 13, 1847 – August 17, 1879) was an American amateur naturalist and artist, known as "the other Audubon". Jones was inspired by the work of John James Audubon to illustrate a book identifying nests and eggs of the 130 species of birds that nested in Ohio. She died having completed only five illustrations, and the book, Illustrations of the Nests and Eggs of Birds of Ohio, was published posthumously.

== Personal life and education ==
Jones was born on May 13, 1847, in Circleville, Ohio to parents Dr. Nelson E. Jones and Virginia Smith Jones. She had one younger brother, Howard. Jones was home-schooled by her mother until she reached high-school age, when she attended high school in Circleville. She excelled in mathematics, science, languages (French, Greek, and German), music (piano and flute), sewing, and dancing. She graduated from high school in 1865. Following graduation, she continued independent studies of language, music, chemistry, algebra, and calculus. One tutor "considered her the most adept scholar he had ever taught."

In contrast to her academic success, Jones had difficulties in her personal life. She experienced headaches and eye pains as a result of Civil War-related anxiety. During Reconstruction, Jones suffered outbreaks of acne rosacea that made her self-conscious of her appearance. Jones had one serious romantic interest in her life, with whom she was engaged to be married. However, due to his problems with alcoholism, her parents and brother Howard induced her to break off the engagement and forbade her from marrying him. This resulted in a period in which Jones became silent and withdrawn.

In July 1879, while working on illustrations for Illustrations of the Nests and Eggs of Birds of Ohio, Jones fell ill with Typhoid fever. She succumbed to the disease and died three weeks later on August 17, 1879.

== Natural history work and Illustrations of the Nests and Eggs of Birds of Ohio ==
Jones's father Nelson, a doctor and amateur ornithologist, imparted his love of natural history and birds on his children while they were growing up. Nelson, Genevieve, and Howard collected nests and eggs, hand-raised and rescued songbirds, and eventually created a family aviary in the barn behind their house. On one nest-collecting excursion, Genevieve discovered a nest that neither Nelson nor Howard could identify, and learned that there were no existing resources on nests and eggs of North American birds.

Following her broken engagement, Jones traveled to the Centennial Exposition in Philadelphia in 1876. There, she was impressed by John James Audubon's paintings from The Birds of America on display, although she noted that the paintings focused on birds and rarely pictured their corresponding nests and eggs.

Upon her return from Philadelphia, Nelson, Virginia, and Howard encouraged Genevieve to seriously commence work on a book illustrating nests and eggs of North American birds, partially as an ornithological resource and partially as a project to improve her low spirits. Jones originally planned to illustrate the nests and eggs of all 320 species of American birds, but was later persuaded to scale the project back to the 130 species of birds in Ohio.

Jones completed five illustrations (wood thrush, indigo bunting, eastern kingbird, eastern phoebe and yellow warbler) for the project before her death from Typhoid fever in 1879. Virginia and Howard continued work on the book, publishing Illustrations of the Nests and Eggs of Birds of Ohio in 1886. On viewing the first plates, Elliott Coues wrote:

I had no idea that so sumptuous and elegant a publication was in preparation, and am pleased that what promises to be one of the great illustrated works on North American Ornithology should be prepared by women.

== Related media ==
A biography, America's other Audubon, by Joy M. Kiser, was published in 2012.
