= Ralph Haswell Lutz =

American historian (1886–1968)

Ralph Haswell Lutz (18 May 1886, Circleville, Ohio – 8 April 1968, Palo Alto) was an American historian. He was chair of the Board of Directors of the Hoover War Library, 1925–1943.

After studying at Stanford University, Lutz gained his PhD at the University of Heidelberg in 1910. He was an assistant professor of history at the University of Washington from 1916 to 1920. In 1919, he joined the team gathering material for the Hoover War Library, and in 1920 was appointed co-director, of the Hoover War Collections. This was renamed the Hoover War Library in 1922 and in 1925 when he became chair of the board of directors.
