= Curtis Bowers =

American filmmaker, educator, restaurant owner, and politician from Idaho

Member of the Idaho House of Representatives from the 10A district
- In office April 2007 – December 2008
- Preceded by: Robert Ring
- Succeeded by: Pat Takasugi

Personal details
- Born: 1965 (age 60–61) Tampa, Florida, U.S.
- Party: Republican
- Spouse: Lauren Bowers
- Education: Colorado Christian University (BA); University of Colorado Colorado Springs (MA)

Curtis Bowers (born 1965) is an American politician, former educator, restaurateur, and filmmaker who served as a member of the Idaho House of Representatives for the 10A district from April 2007 to December 2008.

== Early life and education ==
Bowers was born in Tampa, Florida in 1965. He earned a Bachelor of Arts degree in business from Colorado Christian University and a Master of Arts in curriculum and instruction from the University of Colorado Colorado Springs.

== Career ==
Bowers was a private school teacher and a public school tutor.

In 1995, Bowers opened a fondue restaurant in Manitou Springs, Colorado. He later owned two other restaurants in Nampa and Boise, Idaho.

In 2007, Bowers was appointed by Idaho governor Butch Otter as a Republican member of Idaho House of Representatives for the 10A district.

Bowers has also worked as a filmmaker. He is known for the documentary Agenda: Grinding America Down. The film is viewed as "the most powerful expose of the communist, socialist, progressive attempt to take over America produced" in 2010 and won the $101,000 grand prize at the 2010 San Antonio Independent Christian Film Festival.

== Filmography ==
Year	Title	Notes
2010	Agenda: Grinding America Down	Director, producer, writer, editor, and cinematographer
2016	Agenda 2: Masters of Deceit	Director, producer, and writer

== Personal life ==
Bowers' wife is Lauren Bowers. They have nine children.
