= Beverly Montgomery =

American politician from Idaho

Member of the Idaho House of Representatives from the District 10, seat A district
- In office December 1998 – December 2002
- Preceded by: Ron Crane
- Succeeded by: Robert Ring

Personal details
- Party: Republican
- Relatives: Kitty Gurnsey (sister)
- Occupation: Politician

Beverly Montgomery is a former American politician from Idaho. Montgomery was a Republican member of Idaho House of Representatives.

== Early life ==
Montgomery's parents were Robert G. Wallace and Thelma Halferty Wallace. Montgomery's grandfathers Robert Halferty and Frank Wallace both served in the Idaho legislature.

== Career ==
On November 3, 1998, Montgomery won the election and became a Republican member of Idaho House of Representatives for District 10, seat A. Montgomery defeated Loren Dale Kenyon with 69.2% of the votes. On November 7, 2000, as an incumbent, Montgomery won the election unopposed and continued serving District 10, seat A.

== Personal life ==
In 2015, Montgomery's sister Kitty Gurnsey, also a politician, died.
