= Dwight Radcliff =

American sheriff (1932–2020)

Dwight E. Radcliff (September 14, 1932 – May 6, 2020) was Sheriff of Pickaway County, Ohio from 1965 to 2013. He was the longest-serving sheriff in the United States. First elected in 1964 as a Democrat, he was re-elected 12 times. His father, Charles Radcliff, was Sheriff from 1931 to 1961, and his son, Robert B. Radcliff, succeeded him as the newly elected Sheriff from 2012–2020. He is most famous for serving as sheriff for the entirety of the Circleville Letters mystery, but all efforts to resolve the mystery during his tenure proved fruitless. Dwight died at OhioHealth Berger Hospital on May 6, 2020, at the age of 87.

== Family and personal life ==
As a boy, Radcliff lived in a huge, stately house connected to the Pickaway County jail. After leaving for a while, he moved back living in his boyhood home again when he became sheriff, raising his own family where he was raised. That includes the former sheriff, Robert "Robbie" Radcliff, his son. Sheriff Radcliff said he had no qualms about raising his kids in that environment. Eventually, it was time to go for good, though. The old jail closed in 1992. "Having been there all my life, it was hard to leave there", Radcliff shared. His wife, Betty Radcliff, née Bircher, is the daughter of Orin Bircher.

Radcliff continued to reside in Circleville, Ohio in retirement with his wife, Betty, who is also a commissioned deputy for the department and worked for the Ohio Attorney General.

== Jail house ==
Years later, the old jail cells now hold bankers boxes of court records instead of inmates. Former bedrooms have been transformed into office space. Radcliff's reputation for apprehending criminals has earned nicknames for both the jail "The Radcliff Hilton" and the county "Putaway Pickaway."

== Sources ==
- Pickaway Sheriff
