= Jaron Crane =

American politician in the Idaho House of Representatives

Member of the Idaho House of Representatives from the 12B district
- Incumbent
- Assumed office December 1, 2022
- Preceded by: Rick Youngblood

Personal details
- Born: Ronald Crane Nampa, Idaho, U.S.
- Party: Republican
- Relations: Ron Crane (father); Brent Crane (brother)
- Education: Ohio Christian University (AS); Boise State University (BA)

Military service
- Branch/service: United States Army
- Unit: Idaho Army National Guard

Ronald "Jaron" Crane is an American politician serving as a member of the Idaho House of Representatives for the 12B district. He assumed office on December 1, 2022.

== Early life and education ==
Crane was born and raised in Nampa, Idaho, the youngest of six children born to Ron Crane. His older brother, Brent Crane, is also a member of the Idaho House of Representatives. Jaron attended Hobe Sound Bible College before earning an associate degree in business management from Ohio Christian University. He later earned a Bachelor of Arts degree in political science from Boise State University.

== Career ==
While attending Boise State University, Crane joined the Idaho Army National Guard. He is the vice president of Crane Alarm Service and co-founder of American Fire Protection. Crane was elected to the Idaho House of Representatives in November 2022. He is a member of the House Business Committee.
