= Gayle Batt =

American politician

Member of the Idaho House of Representatives from District 11 Seat A
- In office December 1, 2012 – December 1, 2016
- Preceded by: Steven Thayn
- Succeeded by: Scott Syme

Member of the Idaho House of Representatives from District 10 Seat A
- In office November 2011 – December 1, 2012
- Preceded by: Pat Takasugi
- Succeeded by: Brandon Hixon

Personal details
- Born: Nampa, Idaho
- Party: Republican
- Spouse: Roger Batt
- Education: Oregon State University

Gayle L. Batt (born in Nampa, Idaho) was a Republican Idaho State Representative representing District 11 in the A seat from 2012 to 2016 and District 10 Seat A from November 2011 to December 2012.

== Education ==
Batt earned a Bachelor of Science degree in Agricultural Business Management from Oregon State University.

== Career ==
Batt was a campaign coordinator for Governor Butch Otter and a campaign manager for Pat Takasugi.

In 2011, after Republican Representative Pat Takasugi died from appendix cancer, Batt was appointed by Governor Butch Otter to succeed him as a member of Idaho House of Representatives for District 11.

2012

Redistricted to District 11, Batt ran for its A seat in the Republican primary election, winning with 66% of the vote against Greg Collett.

On November 6, 2012 Batt won the election and became a member of Idaho House of Representatives for District 11 seat A. Batt was unopposed and received 14,609 votes.

In 2014, Batt was unopposed in the Republican primary election.

On November 4, 2014, as an incumbent, Batt won the election and continued serving District 11 seat A. Batt won unopposed and received 10,922 votes.

In September 2015 she announced that she would not be running for re-election saying ""I came to the legislature in 2011 to 'do,' not to 'become.' As an advocate of term limits, I set a personal limit of six years' service. My voting record is clear; the votes that I cast were not made for the purpose of getting re-elected. I believe only when one is free from self-preservation are they truly free to serve others, I look forward to serving out the remainder of my term which expires in November 2016."

2018

She and her husband Roger serves has campaign co-chairs for Congressman Raúl Labrador Idaho gubernatorial election, 2018 run.
