= Darrell Bolz =

American politician (born 1943)

Member of the Idaho House of Representatives from District 10 Seat B
- In office December 1, 2000 – November 30, 2014
- Preceded by: Dorothy Reynolds
- Succeeded by: Greg Chaney

Personal details
- Born: July 24, 1943 (age 83) Ontario, Oregon
- Party: Republican
- Education: University of Idaho

Military service
- Branch/service: United States Navy
- Years of service: 1966–1969

Darrell G. Bolz (born July 24, 1943, in Ontario, Oregon) is a former Republican Idaho State Representative from 2001 to 2014, representing District 10 in the B seat.

== Education ==
Bolz graduated from Fruitland High School, and earned his bachelor's degree in agriculture education from the University of Idaho. After serving three years as a sailor in the United States Navy, he returned to the University of Idaho and completed his master's degree there.

== Elections ==
- 2012: Unopposed for the May 15, 2012 Republican primary, Bolz won with 2,584 votes, facing Democratic nominee Angel Zeimantz for the general election on November 6, 2012.
- 2000: Bolz challenged incumbent Republican Representative Dorothy Reynolds in the May 23, 2000 Republican primary, winning with 1,973 votes (53.3%), and was unopposed for the November 7, 2000 general election, winning with 6,698 votes.
- 2002: Unopposed for the May 28, 2002 Republican primary, Bolz won with 3,262 votes, and was unopposed for the November 5, 2002 general election, winning with 7,276 votes.
- 2004: Unopposed for the May 25, 2004 Republican primary, Bolz won with 3,432 votes, and was unopposed for the November 2, 2004 general election, winning with 9,298 votes.
- 2006: Unopposed for the May 23, 2006 Republican primary, Bolz won with 3,306 votes, and won the November 7, 2006 general election with 6,001 votes (66.27%) against Darlene Madsen (D).
- 2008: Unopposed for the May 27, 2008 Republican primary, Bolz won with 3,306 votes, and was unopposed for the November 4, 2008 general election, winning with 11,382 votes.
- 2010: Bolz won the May 25, 2010 Republican primary with 2,658 votes (74.0%) against Kent Marmon, and was unopposed for the November 2, 2010 general election, winning with 8,280 votes.
