= Churches of Christ in Christian Union =

Christian denomination in the US

Churches of Christ in Christian Union (CCCU)
- Classification: Protestant
- Orientation: Holiness Methodist, Restorationist
- Polity: Congregationalist
- Region: 15 U.S. states, with world missions
- Headquarters: Circleville, Ohio
- Founder: James H. McKibban
- Origin: 1909; Columbus, Ohio
- Separated from: The Christian Union (1909)
- Merger of: Reformed Methodist Church (1952)
- Separations: House of Prayer (1918)
- Congregations: approx. 200
- Official website: www.cccuhq.org

The Churches of Christ in Christian Union (CCCU) is a Wesleyan-Holiness and Restorationist Christian denomination.

The CCCU has a presence in 15 U.S. states and several nations, with about 200 churches in the United States. Ohio Christian University is its educational wing with denominational world headquarters nearby, just outside Circleville, Ohio.

== History ==
The Churches of Christ in Christian Union became a separate denomination in 1909 when five ministers and about 60 lay people were separated from the steadily declining Christian Union headquartered in Ohio.

While the Christian Union was originally formed in 1864 to protest the Methodist Episcopal Church's support of the American Civil War, the CCCU was forged by a dispute over doctrine in 1909. Those holding to a Wesleyan view on sanctification were censured by the leadership of the South Ohio Conference of the Christian Union during a period of time in which many other Holiness movement supporters were at loggerheads within established denominations.

Adherents of Holiness movement teachings contended that Christian Union was dedicated to unity on a few basic principles and should have been able to tolerate Holiness beliefs within its ranks as a matter of Christian liberty. Opponents of the Holiness teaching, however, saw it as a divisive movement that contradicted the Christian Union’s central commitment to harmony. In the Christian Union's development from Methodist dissenters to a Restorationist denomination, it picked up many Presbyterian traits. The leadership of the Christian Union did not see things through the Wesleyan-Arminian theological prism but through a more Calvinist lens and, therefore, a non-Holiness perspective.

When the national organization of the Christian Union decided the censured members could only remain as part of the South Ohio Annual Conference, the members of the new group found themselves without a denominational home and thus pursued an independent course.

The new organization was established under the leadership of James H. McKibban on September 20, 1909, and set up headquarters at Washington Court House, Ohio. By 1915, 40 churches belonged to CCCU. The number of churches increased to 60 by 1925. Most of the Churches of Christ in Christian Union's activities, including camp meetings, new church plants, and evangelistic campaigns, focused on Ohio, although revivals were held in Tennessee and New York.

In 1952, the like-minded Reformed Methodist Church (which had split from the Methodist Episcopal Church in 1813) merged with the CCCU to form its Northeast District.

As common among many Wesleyan-Holiness bodies of the time, the CCCU called for the suffrage of women, the end to secret societies, and abstinence from alcohol and tobacco products.

The organization also formed institutions of higher education, including Circleville Bible College (now Ohio Christian University), which opened in 1948 in Circleville, Ohio.

== Doctrine and polity ==
Like many Restorationist bodies (e.g. the Churches of Christ) CCCU congregations put minimal emphasis on ritual or formalism in worship. Like Wesleyan-Holiness denominations (e.g. the Evangelical Methodist Church), its theology is Wesleyan-Arminian. Revival campaigns, missionary conventions, and camp meetings are vital to the local, district, and general levels of the denomination.

== Organization ==
The CCCU cooperates with other, like-minded denominations. As an example, it sends an observer to the general conferences of its "sister denomination," the Evangelical Methodist Church.

Ohio Christian University (formerly Circleville Bible College, founded in 1948) trains pastors, evangelists, missionaries, teachers, youth directors and ministers of music circle for the CCCU as well as other denominations.

Denominational-level committees include the General Evangelism Committee, General Stewardship Department, Christian Education Department, Evangelical Christian Youth Department, Evangelical Christian Ladies Department, Gifts Of Praise bookroom, and a periodical, the Evangelical Advocate.

The Mount of Praise Camp Meeting in Circleville serves as the general level annual camp meeting for all the congregations.

== Notable members ==
- Alvin C. York aka. "Sergeant York"
