= Dolores Crow =

American politician (1931–2018)

Dolores J. Crow

Member of the Idaho House of Representatives from the 12th district
- In office 1982–2006
- Succeeded by: Brent Crane

Personal details
- Born: Dolores York; November 14, 1931 Clovis, New Mexico, U.S.
- Died: February 9, 2018 (aged 86) Nampa, Idaho, U.S.
- Party: Republican
- Spouse: Wayne Crow (m. 1950)
- Children: 6

Dolores J. Crow (née York; November 14, 1931 – February 9, 2018) was an American politician who served as a member of the Idaho House of Representatives from 1982 to 2006.

== Early life ==
Crow was born in Clovis, New Mexico. In 1933, her family moved to Jerome, Idaho, where she attended Jerome High School. She worked several administrative jobs, including one at the Idaho State Capitol, where she heard of an opening in the state legislature for her district in 1982.

== Career ==
Crow accepted the position as a state legislator, and was re-elected successively for 24 years. During her career, she served on several committees and chaired both the House Revenue and Taxation and the Environmental Affairs Committees. She also served as a member of the Permanent Building Fund Advisory Counsel and was appointed by the Governor of Idaho to be a Commissioner overseeing the restoration of the Capitol. She retired in 2006.

Crow was also co-chair of the newly-formed Redistricting Committee of Idaho in 2011, which was tasked with redrawing state boundaries for legislative districts in response to population changes following the 2010 U.S. census, as mandated by the state constitution. House Speaker Lawerence Denney called for her resignation from the commission, because his members believed that she didn't do enough to protect Republican interests. However, she remained on the commission to continue its work.

== Personal life ==
In the late-1940s, while attending business college in Salt Lake City, she met Wayne Crow and they were married October 22, 1950. In November 1950, he was drafted into military service, and the couple moved to Port Townsend, Washington. After his discharge in 1952, they moved to Moscow, Idaho so he could finish his degree at the University of Idaho. After his graduation in 1956, they moved to Nampa, Idaho, where they raised six children.

Crow died on February 9, 2018, at the age of 86.
