= Senator McGee (disambiguation) =

Gale W. McGee (1915–1992) was a U.S. Senator from Wyoming from 1959 to 1977. Senator McGee may also refer to:

- John McGee (politician) (born 1973), Idaho State Senate
- Kate Brophy McGee (fl. 2010s), Arizona State Senate
- Patricia McGee (1934–2005), New York State Senate
- Thomas M. McGee (born 1955), Massachusetts State Senate

== See also ==
- Senator McGehee (disambiguation)
