= Circleville, Ohio =

- City
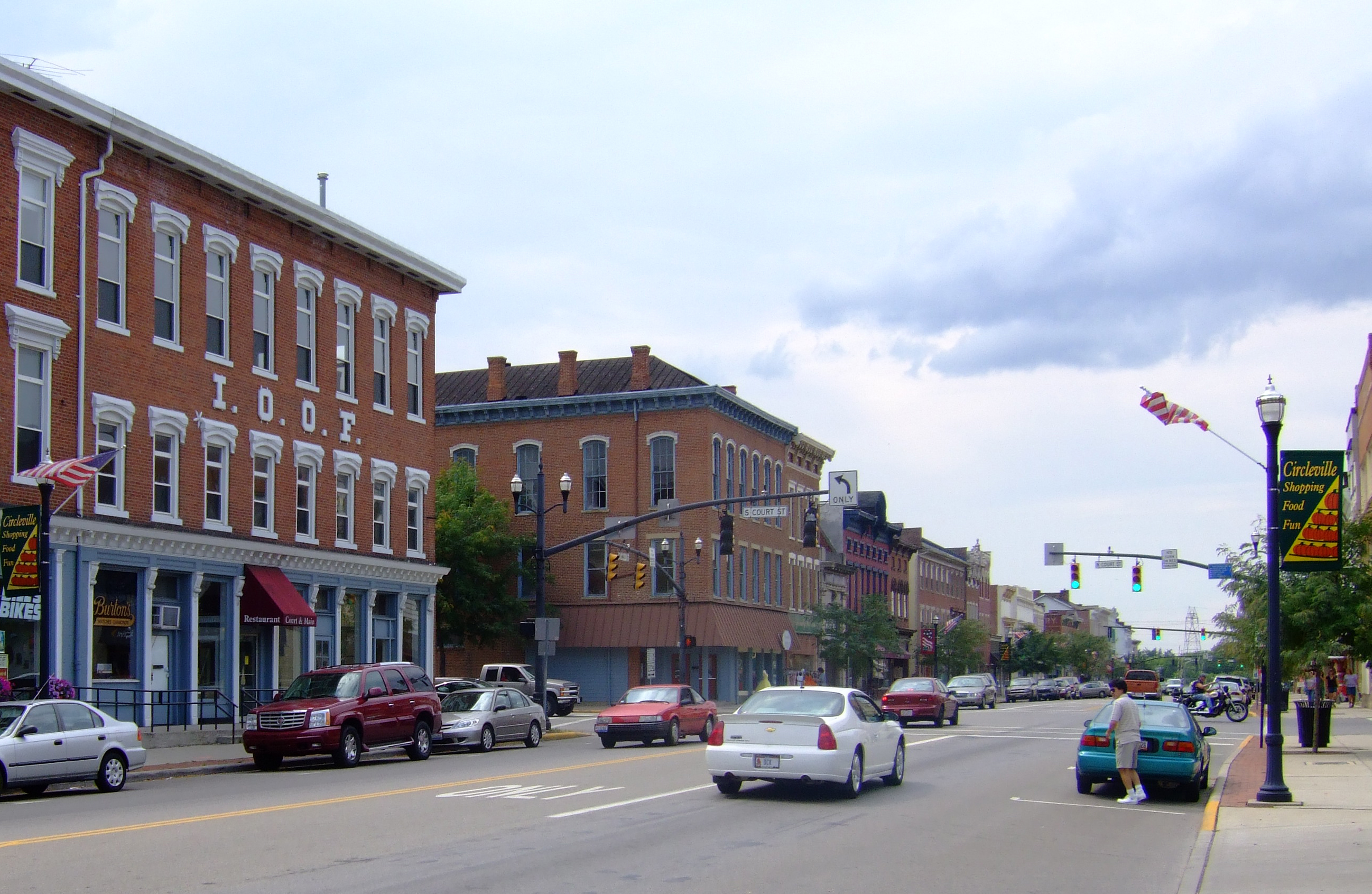
- Circleville's Main Street

- Seal
- Nickname: Roundtown
- Motto: "Home of the Pumpkin Show"
- Interactive map of Circleville, Ohio
- Location within Ohio Location within the United States
- Coordinates: 39°36′50″N 82°56′02″W
- Country: United States
- State: Ohio
- County: Pickaway

Government
  - Mayor: Michelle Blanton (R)

Area
  - Total: 7.34 sq mi (19.00 km^{2})
  - Land: 7.22 sq mi (18.69 km^{2})
  - Water: 0.12 sq mi (0.31 km^{2})
- Elevation: 689 ft (210 m)

Population (2020)
  - Total: 13,927
  - Estimate (2023): 14,452
  - Density: 1,930/sq mi (745.2/km^{2})
- Time zone: UTC-5 (Eastern (EST))
  - Summer (DST): UTC-4 (EDT)
- ZIP code: 43113
- Area codes: 740, 220
- FIPS code: 39-15070
- GNIS feature ID: 2393527
- Website: Official website

Circleville is a city in Pickaway County, Ohio, United States, and its county seat. The city is situated along the Scioto River 25 miles (40 km) south of Columbus. The population was 13,927 at the 2020 census.

Circleville is named after its original layout created in 1810, which was based upon the circular Hopewell tradition earthwork within which the city was built. This earthwork measured 1,100 ft (340 m) in diameter, and was constructed in the early centuries of the Common Era. The county courthouse was built in the center of the innermost circle.

In the late 1830s, for various reasons, residents requested authorisation from the state legislature to change Circleville's layout to a standard grid format. This was accomplished by the mid-1850s. All traces of the Hopewell earthwork were destroyed, although hundreds of other monuments of its kind still remain in the Ohio Valley.

== History ==
=== Early history ===
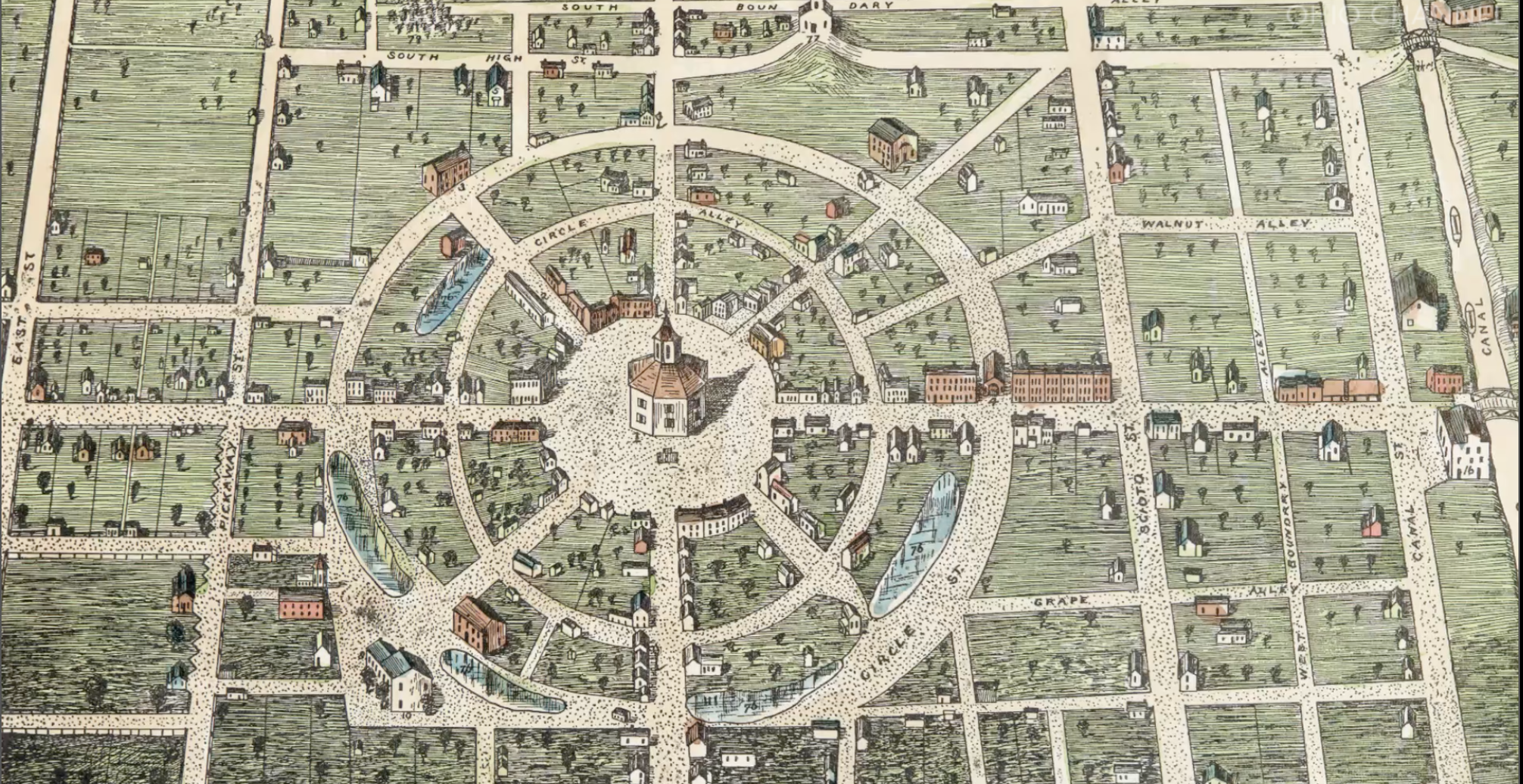
Map of Circleville's original layout

By the mid-18th century, the Lenape (Delaware Indians) were pushed west from Pennsylvania by European settlers flowing into the colony. The Lenape were given permission by the Wyandot people to settle in the Ohio country. One of their settlements was Maguck, a small village built before 1750 on the banks of the Scioto River. Modern Circleville was built to the north of this site.

Frontier explorer Christopher Gist was the first recorded European explorer of the Circleville area. On January 20, 1751, Gist visited Maguck, which had a small population of about 10 families. He wrote in his journal that he had stayed in the town for four days. Between the time of the establishment of the United States and of the city's settlement, the land was owned by the US federal government (As opposed to other land in the county, which was part of the Virginia Military District).

Circleville was founded by European-American settlers in 1810, as people relocated westward after the American Revolutionary War. One such settler was George Hitler Sr., who migrated to Circleville in 1799 with his wife and 4 children, with seven more being born in Circleville after they resettled. One of these children, Dr. Gay Hitler, used to be a dentist. Numerous features of the town are named after this family, these being two 'Hitler' roads, Hubert Hitler Road, Hitler Pond, Hitler-Park, and Hitler-Ludvig cemetery. There is no connection between the family and Adolf Hitler, whose surname was defined much later.

=== Establishment ===
On January 12, 1810, Pickaway County was established by order of the Ohio General Assembly. On February 19 of that year, the assembly appointed David Bradford, George Jackson, and John Pollock to choose the location for the county seat. The men ventured across the county and inspected numerous sites. The Hopewell fortifications were still intact at this time, and were selected as the site for Circleville's construction. A history of the county published in 1880 suggests that the men thought the site location would spur the preservation and maintenance of the Hopewell mounds. The group was subsequently assigned appointed director Daniel Dreisbach to oversee them on July 25. Dreisbach was to purchase the land, determine lots, and distribute them. At the time, the land was owned by Jacob Zeiger, Zeiger Jr., and Samuel Watt; Dreisbach purchased 200 acres for a sum of $800 to $900.

The first sale of property in the new town was followed with a celebration: a barbecue, and the manufacture of a several-hundred-pound wheel of cheese, which was transported to the barbecue on a sled. A competition for the honor of constructing the first house also took place. By 1827, the town had a population of 725 people, 102 individual houses, a courthouse, jail, government office building, a private and public school, one church, nine stores, three pharmacies, three groceries, and a market house. All buildings were made with brick, except the jail, which was made out of stone.

The settlement was formally incorporated as the town of Circleville in 1814, and it was made a city on March 25, 1853.

=== Squaring the circle ===
Over time, residents grew dissatisfied with Circleville's unusual layout. Some believed the design was kept only due to "childish sentimentalism", while others complained that the lots were irregular and inconvenient, and that a circular plan wasted space that could otherwise be used to generate revenue. Additionally, the space around the central courthouse had become unpresentable. People from the countryside would hitch their horses around the courthouse, which would draw hogs and domestic animals to the area and surrounding city.

In March 1837, at the request of the town, the Ohio General Assembly authorized the requested alterations given the consent of all property owners in the circle. In March 1838, after no activity, the assembly authorized alterations to any quadrant given consent from property owners in the quarter. The "Circleville Squaring Company" was created to convert the town plan into a squared grid, as was the typical style of platted towns. The southeast corner was the first to be altered later in March, followed by the northwest quarter in September. The northeast corner was only squared in 1849, and the southwest was reformed in 1856. This process required intense construction work, such as destroying, moving, or constructing buildings and grading and repaving roads. Due to these changes, no traces of the original earthworks remain aside from a section of elevated ground at the corner of Pickaway and Franklin streets. A history of the county makes note that the citizens of Circleville regret the rare circular layout of the town was ever changed.

The only drawings of Circleville before its squaring were made by G. F. Wittich. He made sketches of the courthouse, the circle, and the other buildings in 1836. Wittich used these drawings along with information from residents to create a map around 1860, of which he produced a watercolour rendition in 1870.

=== 20th century ===
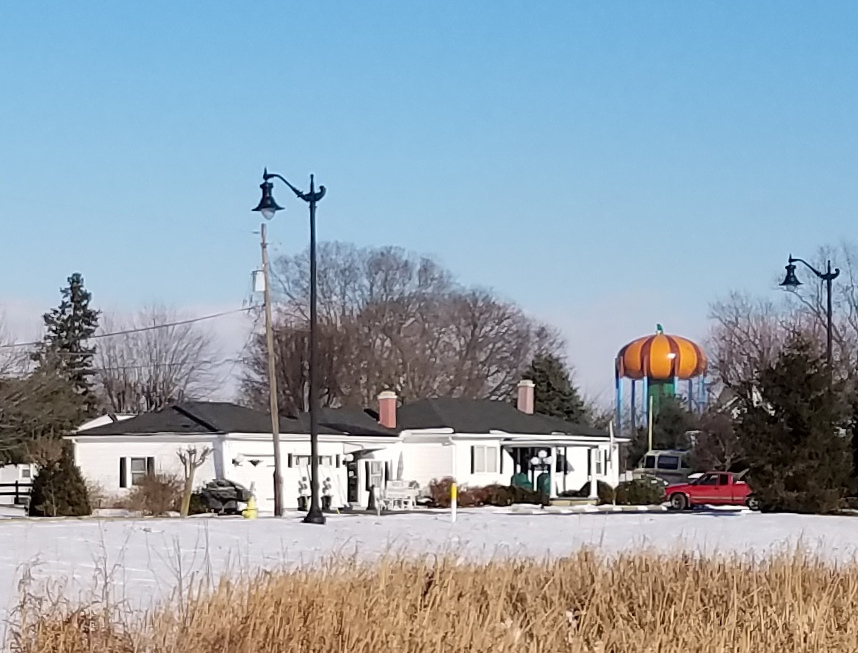
The Circleville Pumpkin Water Tower

During April 1967, Bingman's Drug Store and several neighboring buildings on West Main Street in downtown Circleville were destroyed. Lee Holbrook, the husband of a drug store employee, brought a wooden box containing bundled dynamite into the store, wherein it detonated during a struggle with the store's staff. Holbrook and four employees died in the blast and ensuing fire, and nearly thirty others were injured.

On October 13, 1999, an F-3 tornado hit the city, set off by a squall line moving through the region. The tornado touched down on the north side of town, dealing considerable damage to a barber's shop and a masonry building. A furniture store also received a hole in its roof, and it was reported that items from inside the store were sucked out. Damage to nearby buildings occurred as the tornado moved east across the north-central part of town. The tornado moved into a residential area in the Northwood Park neighborhood, destroying several homes and damaging trees and vehicles.

=== Circleville letters mystery ===
Starting in 1977, residents began receiving mysterious letters from an unknown source identified only as "Writer". The letters contained threats of violence and supposed blackmail, often as means of coercing the receiver to comply with the Writer's will (e.g., voting for the Writer's preferred candidate in the county election), and contained intimate details of the recipients personal lives. On January 27, 1983, the Writer hung up a sign visible from the bus route of Circleville School, containing obscenities regarding the 13-year-old daughter of bus driver Mary Gillispie. Upon observation of the sign, Gillispie discovered a booby-trapped box containing a loaded gun, which was rigged to fire upon attempted removal of the sign. Gillispie and her husband Ronald had previously received letters from the Writer accusing her of engaging in an extramarital affair with school superintendent Gordon Massie. Ronald had been killed under mysterious circumstances six years prior, in August 1977.

While the Gillispies' brother-in-law Paul Freshour was sentenced to 10 years in prison for the boobytrap incident in 1984, letters continued to circulate during his imprisonment. It was only after Freshour's release in 1994 that the Writer ceased threatening the residents of Circleville.

As of August 2026, the identity of the Writer remains unknown.

== Geography ==
Circleville is situated on the eastern bank of the Scioto River, and is 25 miles south of Columbus and 22 miles north of Chillicothe.

According to the United States Census Bureau, the city has a total area of 6.76 square miles (17.51 km^{2}), of which, 6.64 square miles (17.20 km^{2}) is land and 0.12 square miles (0.31 km^{2}) is water.

Calamus Swamp is a 19-acre public reserve located 1.5 miles (2.4 km) from the town.

=== Climate ===
Climate data for Circleville, Ohio, 1991–2020 normals, extremes 1894–present
Month	Jan	Feb	Mar	Apr	May	Jun	Jul	Aug	Sep	Oct	Nov	Dec	Year
Record high °F (°C)	77 (25)	79 (26)	90 (32)	94 (34)	98 (37)	102 (39)	109 (43)	107 (42)	103 (39)	97 (36)	82 (28)	79 (26)	109 (43)
Mean maximum °F (°C)	62.4 (16.9)	64.8 (18.2)	74.2 (23.4)	82.3 (27.9)	87.9 (31.1)	92.3 (33.5)	93.0 (33.9)	92.2 (33.4)	90.6 (32.6)	83.9 (28.8)	73.1 (22.8)	63.8 (17.7)	94.4 (34.7)
Mean daily maximum °F (°C)	38.6 (3.7)	42.0 (5.6)	52.1 (11.2)	65.5 (18.6)	74.8 (23.8)	82.9 (28.3)	85.8 (29.9)	85.0 (29.4)	79.5 (26.4)	67.6 (19.8)	54.1 (12.3)	43.1 (6.2)	64.3 (17.9)
Daily mean °F (°C)	30.8 (−0.7)	33.5 (0.8)	42.3 (5.7)	53.8 (12.1)	64.0 (17.8)	72.6 (22.6)	75.4 (24.1)	74.2 (23.4)	68.0 (20.0)	56.3 (13.5)	44.6 (7.0)	35.7 (2.1)	54.3 (12.4)
Mean daily minimum °F (°C)	23.0 (−5.0)	25.0 (−3.9)	32.5 (0.3)	42.1 (5.6)	53.1 (11.7)	62.2 (16.8)	65.1 (18.4)	63.5 (17.5)	56.5 (13.6)	45.1 (7.3)	35.1 (1.7)	28.4 (−2.0)	44.3 (6.8)
Mean minimum °F (°C)	1.0 (−17.2)	5.1 (−14.9)	14.3 (−9.8)	25.5 (−3.6)	37.1 (2.8)	48.4 (9.1)	54.2 (12.3)	52.3 (11.3)	42.1 (5.6)	30.0 (−1.1)	19.9 (−6.7)	10.7 (−11.8)	−2.0 (−18.9)
Record low °F (°C)	−23 (−31)	−21 (−29)	−5 (−21)	11 (−12)	25 (−4)	35 (2)	42 (6)	38 (3)	26 (−3)	15 (−9)	−6 (−21)	−19 (−28)	−23 (−31)
Average precipitation inches (mm)	2.89 (73)	2.51 (64)	3.26 (83)	3.99 (101)	4.47 (114)	4.65 (118)	3.86 (98)	3.42 (87)	2.96 (75)	2.99 (76)	2.84 (72)	3.10 (79)	40.94 (1,040)
Average snowfall inches (cm)	6.7 (17)	4.6 (12)	1.5 (3.8)	0.2 (0.51)	0.0 (0.0)	0.0 (0.0)	0.0 (0.0)	0.0 (0.0)	0.0 (0.0)	0.0 (0.0)	0.4 (1.0)	2.0 (5.1)	15.4 (39.41)
Average precipitation days (≥ 0.01 in)	12.2	10.3	11.2	12.2	12.8	11.4	9.9	9.3	8.4	9.4	10.0	11.2	128.3
Average snowy days (≥ 0.1 in)	4.6	3.6	1.5	0.3	0.0	0.0	0.0	0.0	0.0	0.0	0.4	2.5	12.9
Source 1: NOAA
Source 2: National Weather Service

== Demographics ==
Historical population
Census	Pop.	Note	%±
1820	908		—
1830	1,136		25.1%
1840	2,329		105.0%
1850	3,411		46.5%
1860	4,383		28.5%
1870	5,407		23.4%
1880	6,046		11.8%
1890	6,556		8.4%
1900	6,991		6.6%
1910	6,744		−3.5%
1920	7,049		4.5%
1930	7,369		4.5%
1940	7,989		8.4%
1950	8,723		9.2%
1960	11,059		26.8%
1970	11,687		5.7%
1980	11,682		0.0%
1990	11,666		−0.1%
2000	13,485		15.6%
2010	13,314		−1.3%
2020	13,927		4.6%
2023 (est.)	14,452		3.8%

=== 2020 census ===
As of the 2020 census, Circleville had a population of 13,927. The median age was 39.3 years. 22.1% of residents were under the age of 18 and 20.6% of residents were 65 years of age or older. For every 100 females there were 95.0 males, and for every 100 females age 18 and over there were 91.0 males age 18 and over.

97.2% of residents lived in urban areas, while 2.8% lived in rural areas.

There were 5,625 households in Circleville, of which 27.6% had children under the age of 18 living in them. Of all households, 39.9% were married-couple households, 19.8% were households with a male householder and no spouse or partner present, and 31.1% were households with a female householder and no spouse or partner present. About 33.3% of all households were made up of individuals and 16.2% had someone living alone who was 65 years of age or older.

There were 6,130 housing units, of which 8.2% were vacant. Among occupied housing units, 55.2% were owner-occupied and 44.8% were renter-occupied. The homeowner vacancy rate was 2.6% and the rental vacancy rate was 6.7%.

Racial composition as of the 2020 census
Race	Number	Percent
White	12,562	90.2%
Black or African American	368	2.6%
American Indian and Alaska Native	56	0.4%
Asian	98	0.7%
Native Hawaiian and Other Pacific Islander	3	<0.1%
Some other race	89	0.6%
Two or more races	751	5.4%
Hispanic or Latino (of any race)	270	1.9%

=== 2010 census ===
As of the 2010 census, there were 13,314 people, 5,402 households, and 3,447 families residing in the city. The population density was 2,005.1 inhabitants per square mile (774.2/km^{2}). There were 6,024 housing units at an average density of 907.2 per square mile (350.3/km^{2}). The racial makeup of the city was 95.4% White, 1.9% African American, 0.2% Native American, 0.4% Asian, 0.4% from other races, and 1.7% from two or more races. Hispanic or Latino people of any race were 1.1% of the population.

There were 5,402 households, of which 30.3% had children under the age of 18 living with them, 44.2% were married couples living together, 14.5% had a female householder with no husband present, 5.1% had a male householder with no wife present, and 36.2% were non-families. 30.5% of all households were made up of individuals, and 13.5% had someone living alone who was 65 years of age or older. The average household size was 2.36 and the average family size was 2.90.

The median age in the city was 39.3 years. 23.3% of residents were under the age of 18; 8.9% were between the ages of 18 and 24; 24.8% were from 25 to 44; 25.4% were from 45 to 64; and 17.7% were 65 years of age or older. The gender makeup of the city was 47.9% male and 52.1% female.

=== 2000 census ===
As of the 2000 census, there were 13,485 people, 5,378 households, and 3,581 families residing in the city. The population density was 2,037.2 inhabitants per square mile (786.6/km^{2}). There were 5,706 housing units at an average density of 862.0 per square mile (332.8/km^{2}). The racial makeup of the city was 95.36% White, 2.54% African American, 0.20% Native American, 0.49% Asian, 0.06% Pacific Islander, 0.27% from other races, and 1.08% from two or more races. Hispanic or Latino people of any race were 0.82% of the population.

There were 5,378 households, out of which 31.1% had children under the age of 18 living with them, 49.8% were married couples living together, 12.7% had a female householder with no husband present, and 33.4% were non-families. 29.0% of all households were made up of individuals, and 13.4% had someone living alone who was 65 years of age or older. The average household size was 2.40 and the average family size was 2.93.

In the city the population was spread out, with 26.7% under the age of 18, 8.6% from 18 to 24, 26.7% from 25 to 44, 22.0% from 45 to 64, and 16.1% who were 65 years of age or older. The median age was 36 years. For every 100 females, there were 94.8 males. For every 100 females age 18 and over, there were 85.8 males.

The median income for a household in the city was $34,572, and the median income for a family was $41,943. Males had a median income of $32,342 versus $26,115 for females. The per capita income for the city was $17,220. About 11.1% of families and 13.3% of the population were below the poverty line, including 21.4% of those under age 18 and 6.5% of those age 65 or over.

== Economy ==
Manufacturing makes up a significant proportion of area industry and employment; in the 2010 census, 3075 county residents (13.4%) were employed in manufacturing. Circleville is home to the largest DuPont chemical plant in Ohio. Opened in the 1950s, it produces Mylar and Tedlar plastic films, the latter used extensively in the production of photovoltaic modules. PACCAR, a Seattle-based truck manufacturing company, has maintained a large factory for over 35 years.

Sofidel Group, one of the world's largest tissue paper manufacturers, invested $400 million in building a 1.4 million square foot plant on the south side of the city. Once it is operating at full capacity, the plant will employ approximately 700 people. The first roll of paper was produced from the plant in June 2018.

The PPG Industries Circleville plant is the company's center for polymer resin production, primarily for automotive applications. Global Transmission Parts, a distributor of vehicle transmission parts, has its corporate headquarters and main warehouse located east of Circleville on State Route 56.

Other major employers include OhioHealth; Circleville City, Teays Valley Local and Logan Elm Local School districts; Circle Plastics/TriMold LLC; the State of Ohio; and Wal-Mart Stores.

== Arts and culture ==
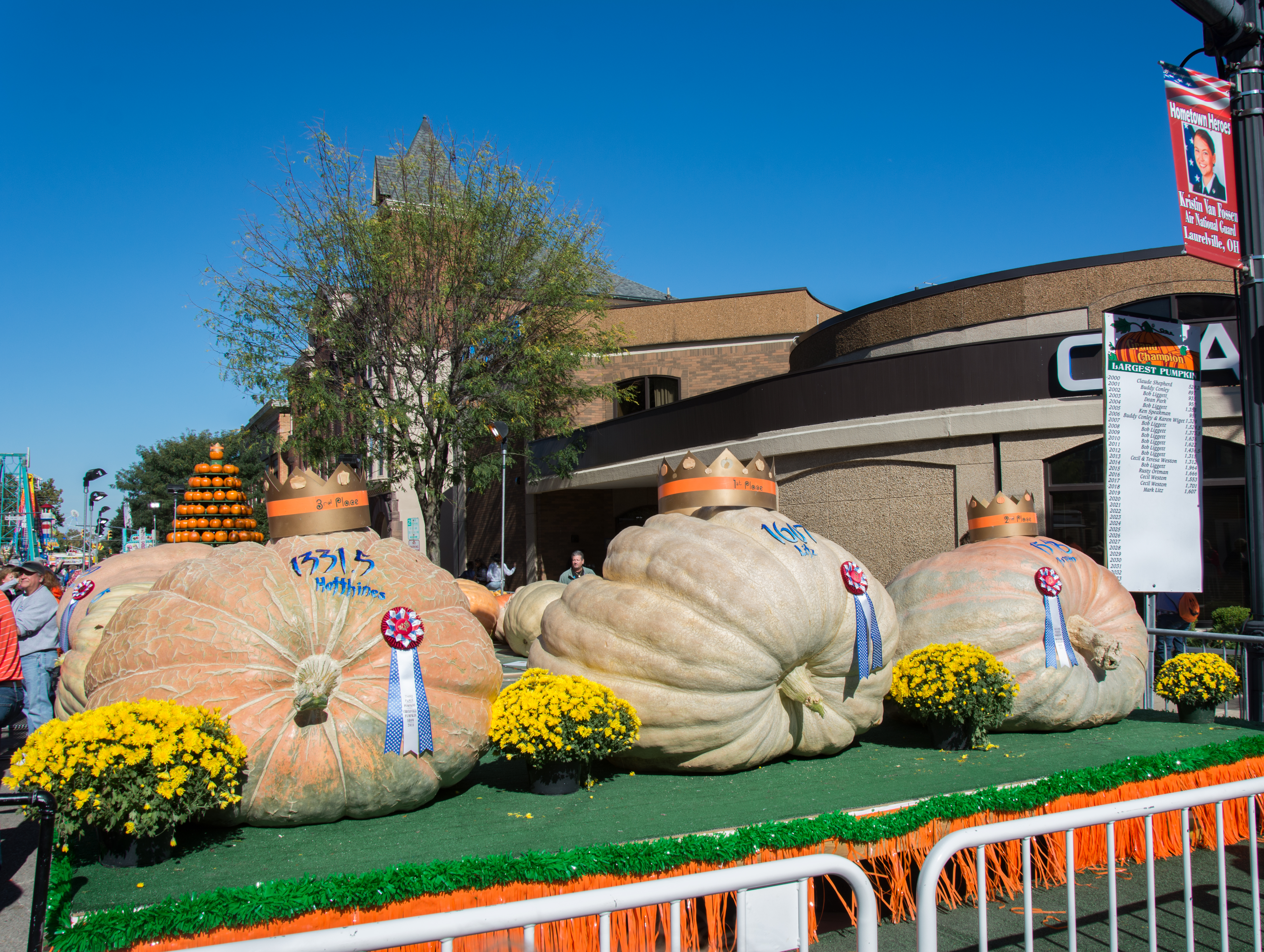
Prize-winning pumpkins at the 2018 Circleville Pumpkin Show

Circleville hosts the Circleville Pumpkin Show every October.

The Clarke-May Museum is run by the Pickaway County Historical Society.

== Education ==
Circleville City School District operates one elementary school, one middle school, and Circleville High School.

Ohio Christian University, an institution affiliated with Churches of Christ in Christian Union, has been in operation at Circleville since 1948.

Circleville has a public library, a branch of the Pickaway County Library.

== Infrastructure ==
=== Transportation ===
The Pickaway County Memorial Airport is located five nautical miles (5.8 mi; 9.3 km) south of Circleville's central business district.

== Notable people ==
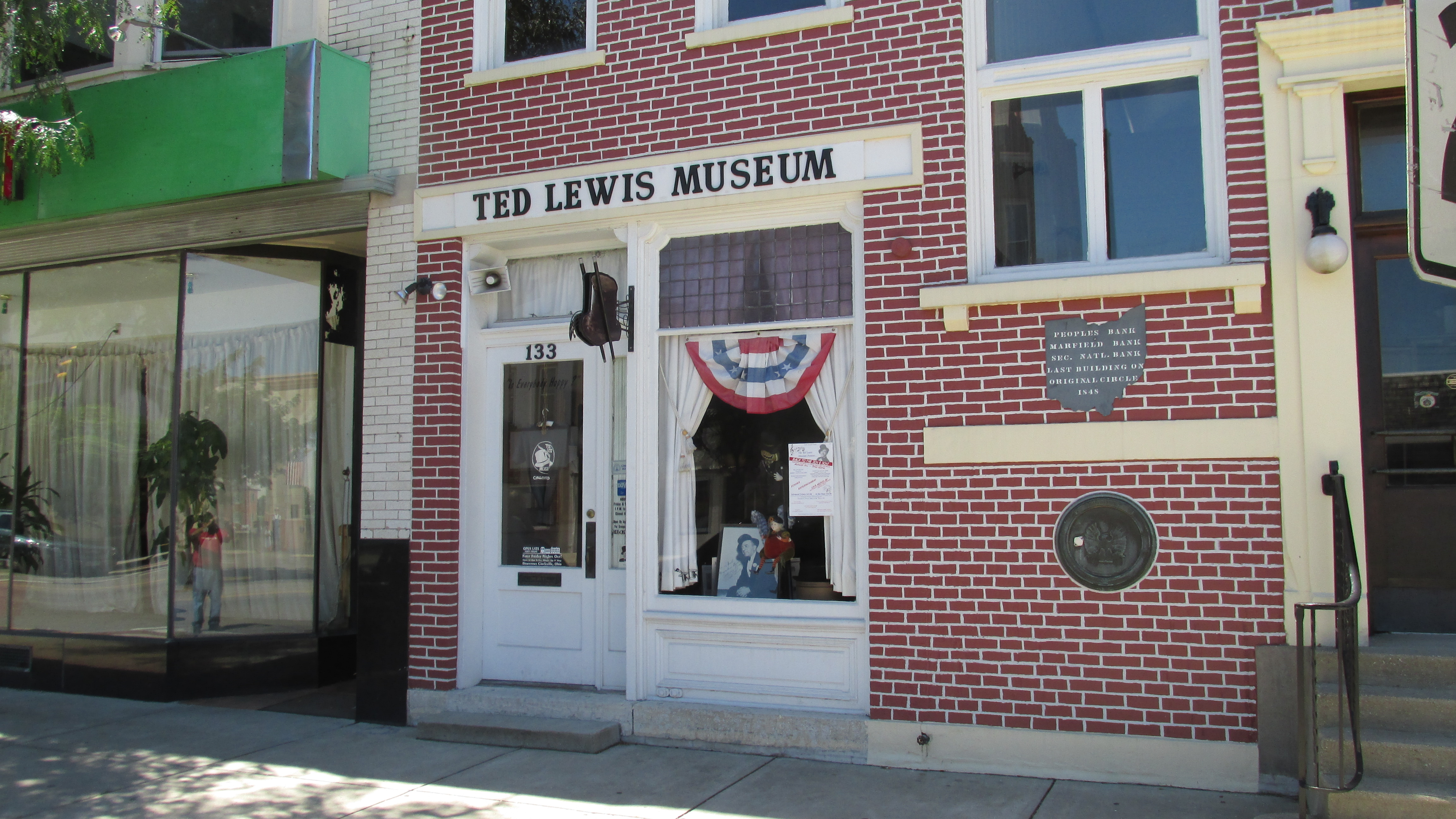
The Ted Lewis Museum, the last remaining building from the town's circular plan

- Caleb Atwater – known as the "father of Ohio's public school system", the state's first historian, and an early scholar of the ancient Native American mounds and other earthworks in the Ohio Valley
- Rick Clifton – racing driver
- Conchata Ferrell – actress, best known for playing Berta the housekeeper in the CBS sitcom Two and a Half Men
- Genevieve Estelle Jones - ornithologist and illustrator
- Tony Laubach – storm chaser and meteorologist featured on the Discovery Channel
- Ted Lewis – vaudeville performer and bandleader during the Roaring Twenties; a Ted Lewis Museum is located in the city, and a local park bears his name
- Ralph Haswell Lutz (1886–1968) – historian and chair of the board of directors of the Hoover War Library, 1925–1943
- Tiffany McDaniel – author
- Marguerite Courtright Patton – 21st President General of the Daughters of the American Revolution
- Dwight Radcliff – longest serving sheriff in US history
- Kohl Sudduth – actor known for the Jesse Stone series of TV movies
