= Illustrations of the Nests and Eggs of Birds of Ohio =

Book of scientific illustrations

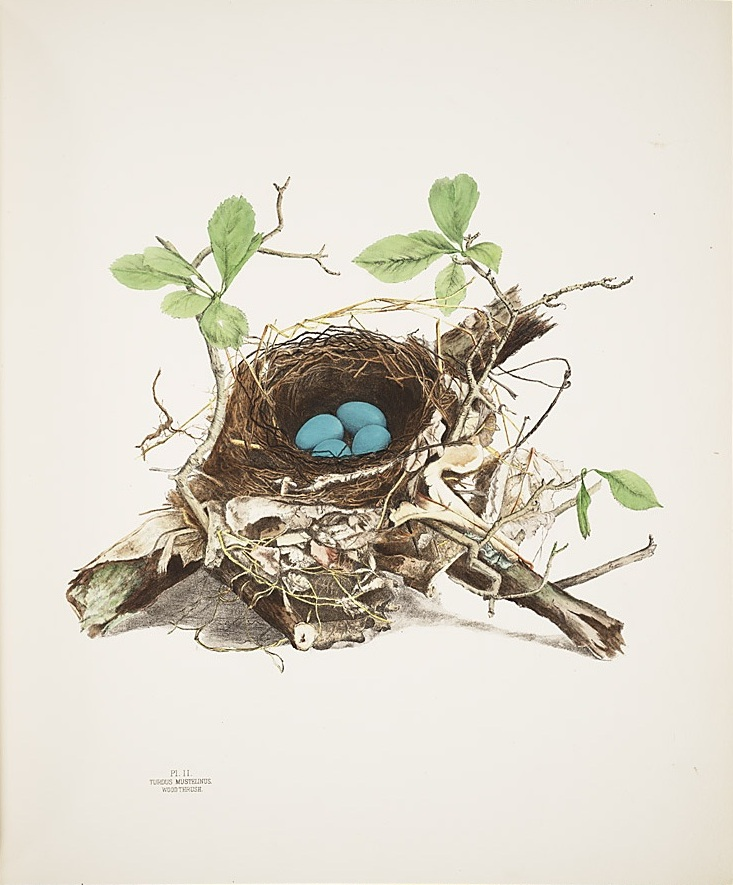
- Illustration of the Nest of a Wood Thrush, Plate II, 1879, by Genevieve Estelle Jones
- Author: Howard Jones
- Illustrator: Genevieve Estelle Jones
- Subject: Ornithology
- Publication date: 1879-1886
- Publication place: United States

Illustrations of the Nests and Eggs of Birds of Ohio is a two volume book of scientific illustrations published by subscription between the years 1879 and 1886. It was conceived by Genevieve Estelle Jones, who began work on the book in 1877 and was initially its principal illustrator. Her childhood friend Eliza Jane Shulze also undertook illustrations for the book. Jones completed five illustrations (wood thrush, indigo bunting, eastern kingbird, eastern phoebe and yellow warbler) for the project before her death from Typhoid fever in 1879. The book was then completed by Jones's family.

As a child, Jones accompanied her father, Dr. Nelson Jones, as he visited patients. As they traveled, the two would collect birds' eggs and nests for the family's natural history cabinet. Jones developed an interest in ornithology. When Jones and her father acquired a nest of a Baltimore oriole, Jones searched for a book to use to research and identify it and was surprised that one did not exist. Her brother, Howard, later commented that if she would paint the images for such a book he would collect them for her. In 1876, Jones viewed James Audubon's The Birds of America at the World's Fair in Philadelphia and was inspired to undertake the project.

The initial instalment of the book was extremely well received. Ornithologist Elliott Coues, writing in Bulletin of the Nuttall Ornithology Club, wrote that "there has been nothing since Audubon in the way of pictorial illustrations of American Ornithology to compare with the present work - nothing to claim the union of an equal degree of artistic skill and scientific accuracy." Naturalist William Brewster called her illustration of the nest of the Wood Thrush a "perfect masterpiece."

Jones's family collaborated to complete the book after Jones's death. Jones's mother, Virginia Jones, took over first the coloring and then the actual drawing of the illustrations. Dr. Howard Jones wrote the accompanying text, as well as collecting the specimens featured in the illustrations. Jones's father, Dr. Nelson Jones, who had written the original prospectus for the piece, covered most of the costs of its continued publication.
