= Pickaway County Memorial Airport =

Public use airport in Circleville, Ohio

- IATA: none; ICAO: KCYO; FAA LID: CYO

Summary
- Owner/Operator: Pickaway County Airport Authority
- Serves: Circleville, Ohio
- Location: Pickaway County, Ohio
- Time zone: UTC−05:00 (-5)
  - Summer (DST): UTC−04:00 (-4)
- Elevation AMSL: 685 ft (209 m)
- Coordinates: 39°30′58″N 082°58′56″W

Map
- Location of airport in Ohio CYO (the United States)

Runways
| Direction | Length | | Surface |
| Direction | ft | m | Surface |
|---|---|---|---|
| 1/19 | 4,346 | 1,325 | Asphalt |

Statistics (2021)
- Aircraft Operations: 35,770
- Source: Federal Aviation Administration

Pickaway County Memorial Airport (ICAO: KCYO, FAA LID: CYO) is a publicly owned, public-use airport located 5 miles south of Circleville, Ohio. The airport sits on 61 acres at an elevation of 684 feet.

The airport is home to a chapter of the Experimental Aircraft Association, which hosts a variety of events throughout the week and the year. The airport also hosts a regular airplane fly-in that features historic airplanes, such as a World War II era B-25 Mitchell bomber.

== History ==
Planning for an airport in Pickaway County had begun by early August 1965, when it was suggested in the Ohio Senate that it might be one of eleven counties that would not receive an airport. By mid January 1966, a joint airport with Ross County had been proposed. However, following the discovery of numerous complicating factors in late April, a proposed site for the joint airport was rejected in early July 1966. By late August, a new site four miles east of Circleville for a single-county airport had been proposed. The possibility of a joint airport was still being considered in early April 1967 when a group turned fundraising responsibility back over to the county commissioners.

The county approved a loan to purchase land for the airport in early September 1969. At the same time, the name Pickaway County Veterans Memorial Airport was selected for the field. Just under 49 acres (20 ha) of land were purchased for the airport in mid December. As the site chosen was so close to the county line, an airport zoning board to be convened by late March 1970 included two members from Ross County. Ground was broken in late May. The airport was certified by late October 1970 and dedicated 22 November 1970. A new airport manager took over at the airport on 14 March 1975.

== Facilities and aircraft ==
The airport has one runway, designated as runway 1/19. It measures 4346 x 75 ft (1325 x 23 m) and is paved with asphalt.

For the 12-month period ending July 21, 2021, the airport had 35,770 aircraft operations, an average of 98 per day. It included 96% general aviation and 4% military. For the same time period, 20 aircraft were based on the field: 19 single-engine and 1 multi-engine airplanes.

The airport has a fixed-base operator that sells fuel. Additional amenities are available, including restrooms and courtesy transportation.

In 2021, the airport received $1.5 million in grants to improve infrastructure at the airport. In 2022, the airport received an additional $1.4 million grant to rehabilitate its runway in order to maintain its pavement's structural integrity as well as to rehabilitate its existing lighting system.

== Accidents and incidents ==
- On September 29, 2002, a North American AT-6 Texan was destroyed when it impacted the ground while maneuvering at Pickaway County Memorial Airport. Witnesses reported that the airplane had previously made a pass as the lead of a four-ship echelon formation. When the airplane reached the end of the runway, it began a climbing turn, which seemed "noticeably slow." The airplane climbed, stalled, and pitched downwards about 75 degrees nose-low before impacting a cornfield. The probable cause of the accident was found to be the pilot's failure to maintain adequate airspeed during the course reversal, which resulted in an inadvertent stall/spin.
- In June 2009, a Cessna Citation business jet on an instrument approach procedure to the Ross County Airport in Chillicothe mistakenly landed at the Pickaway County Memorial Airport, believing it to be his destination.
- On January 14, 2018, an aircraft made an emergency landing at Pickaway County Memorial Airport because its nose landing gear would not extend properly.
- On November 8, 2020, a Piper PA-32 Cherokee Six crashed after departure from the Pickaway County Memorial Airport. The airplane suddenly lost engine power after takeoff, and due to the aircraft's low altitude, the pilot performed a forced landing straight ahead, coming to rest in a field.

== See also ==
- List of airports in Ohio
