= Rich Wills =

American politician (born 1945)

Richard Wills

Member of the Idaho House of Representatives from District 23 Position A
- In office December 1, 2012 – December 1, 2016
- Preceded by: James Patrick
- Succeeded by: Christy Zito

Member of the Idaho House of Representatives from District 22 Position A
- In office December 1, 2002 – December 1, 2012
- Preceded by: Celia Gould
- Succeeded by: John Vander Woude

Personal details
- Born: June 18, 1945 (age 81) Bassett, Nebraska, US
- Party: Republican
- Spouse: Connie Wills
- Children: 4
- Profession: State Trooper / Politician

Richard A. Wills (born June 18, 1945, in Bassett, Nebraska) is a Republican former Idaho State Representative representing District 23 in the A seat from 2012 to 2016.

== Education ==
Wills graduated from Nampa High School. He retired from a career as an Idaho state trooper and served part-time as an Elmore County deputy until 2016.

== Elections ==
- 2012 Redistricted to 23A, Wills was unopposed for the May 15, 2012, Republican primary, and unopposed for the November 6, 2012 general election after Democratic candidate Jody Bickle withdrew.
- 2010 Unopposed for the May 25, 2010, Republican primary, Wills won with 3,342 votes, and was unopposed for the November 2, 2010, general election, winning with 6,791 votes.
- 2008 Unopposed for the May 27, 2008, Republican primary, Wills won with 2,484 votes, and was unopposed after Democratic nominee Donald Jandera withdrew; Wills won the November 4, 2008, general election with 9,550 votes.
- 2006 Unopposed for the May 23, 2006, Republican primary, Wills won with 2,435 votes, and won the November 7, 2006, general election with 5,047 votes (61.47%) against Karen Schindele (D).
- 2004 Wills was unopposed for the May 25, 2004, Republican primary, winning with 2,274 votes [see reference quote] Wills won the November 2, 2004, general election with 7,627 votes (72.0%) against Bob Works (D).
- 2002 When Republican Representative Celia R. Gould left the District 22 A seat open to run for Lieutenant Governor of Idaho, Craig McCurry was unopposed for the May 28, 2002, Republican primary. McCurry was replaced by Wills on the ballot for the November 5, 2002, general election and Wills won unopposed with 6,281 votes.
