= Ohio Christian University =

Christian college in Circleville, Ohio, US

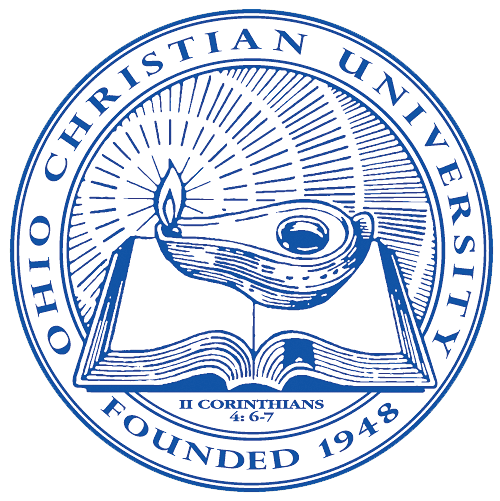
- Ohio Christian University Seal
- Former names: Mount of Praise Bible College (1947–1948); Circleville Bible College (1948–2006)
- Motto: Follow Christ, Lead the Way
- Type: Private university
- Established: 1947; 79 years ago
- Accreditation: HLC
- Religious affiliation: Churches of Christ in Christian Union
- President: R.D. Saunders
- Provost: Krista Stonerock
- Students: 1,600 (fall 2022)
- Undergraduates: 1,439
- Postgraduates: 161
- Location: Circleville, Ohio, U.S. 39°36′45″N 82°54′18″W
- Campus: Rural
- Colors: Blue & Silver
- Nickname: Trailblazers
- Sporting affiliations: NCCAA
- Website: ohiochristian.edu
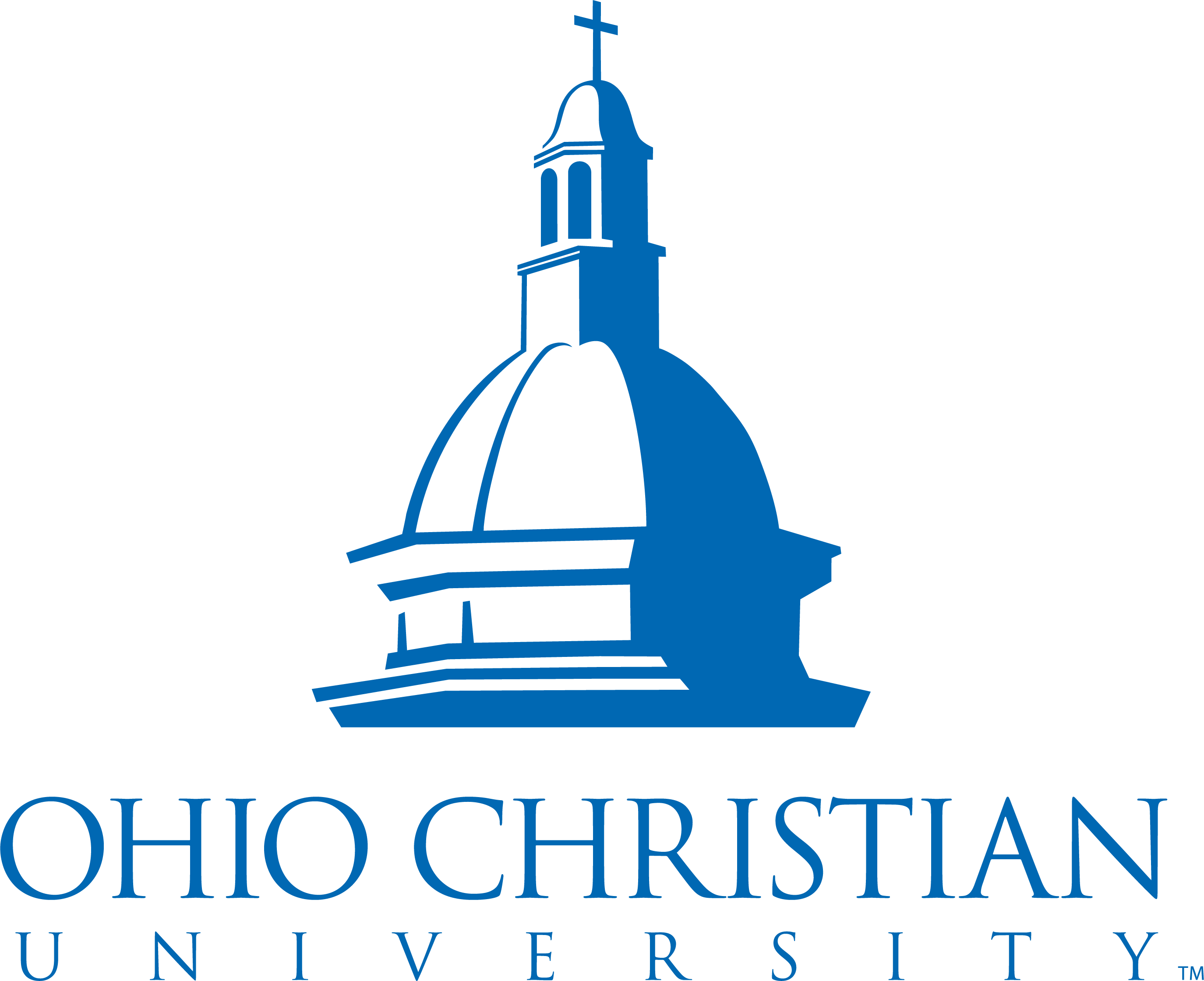

Ohio Christian University (OCU) is a private Christian college in Circleville, Ohio, United States. It is denominationally affiliated with the Churches of Christ in Christian Union.

== History ==
The school was founded in 1948 as Mount of Praise Bible College, which met at the Mount of Praise Campground, where the Churches of Christ in Christian Union held annual revivalist camp meetings. The primary objective of the bible college was to train ministers for the Churches of Christ in Christian Union denomination. It later became Circleville Bible College. In 2006, the college changed its name to Ohio Christian University and received regional accreditation.

The university was granted an exception to Title IX in 2016 which allows it to legally discriminate against LGBT students for religious reasons.

=== Presidents ===
Name	Service Period
Everett A. Keaton	1948–1952
Guy C. Johnson	1952–1953
Richard G. Humble	1953–1956
Glen Johnson	1956–1959
Morton W. Dorsey	1959–1964
Melvin Maxwell	1964–1980
Douglas Carter	1980–1989
David Van Hoose	1989–1994
John Conley	1995–2005
Mark A. Smith	2006–2017
Jon S. Kulaga	2017–2022
Ronald E. Smith	2022–2024
Ryan D. Saunders	2024-current

== Campus ==
The university sits on the outskirts of Circleville, Ohio. Classes are located in the Maxwell Center, Johnson Hall, and the Robert W. Plaster Free Enterprise Center. Students reside as freshmen in York Hall and Moore Hall. From there, they may choose to live in New Hall for women and New 2 Hall for men, or a selection of on-campus townhouses. The Hickman Student Center houses dining facilities, the office of Student Development, the department of psychology, and several classrooms. In addition, there is a full Christian bookstore, a coffee shop, and a game room.

Since 2008, Maxwell Center has expanded by adding the executive center and a student development center.

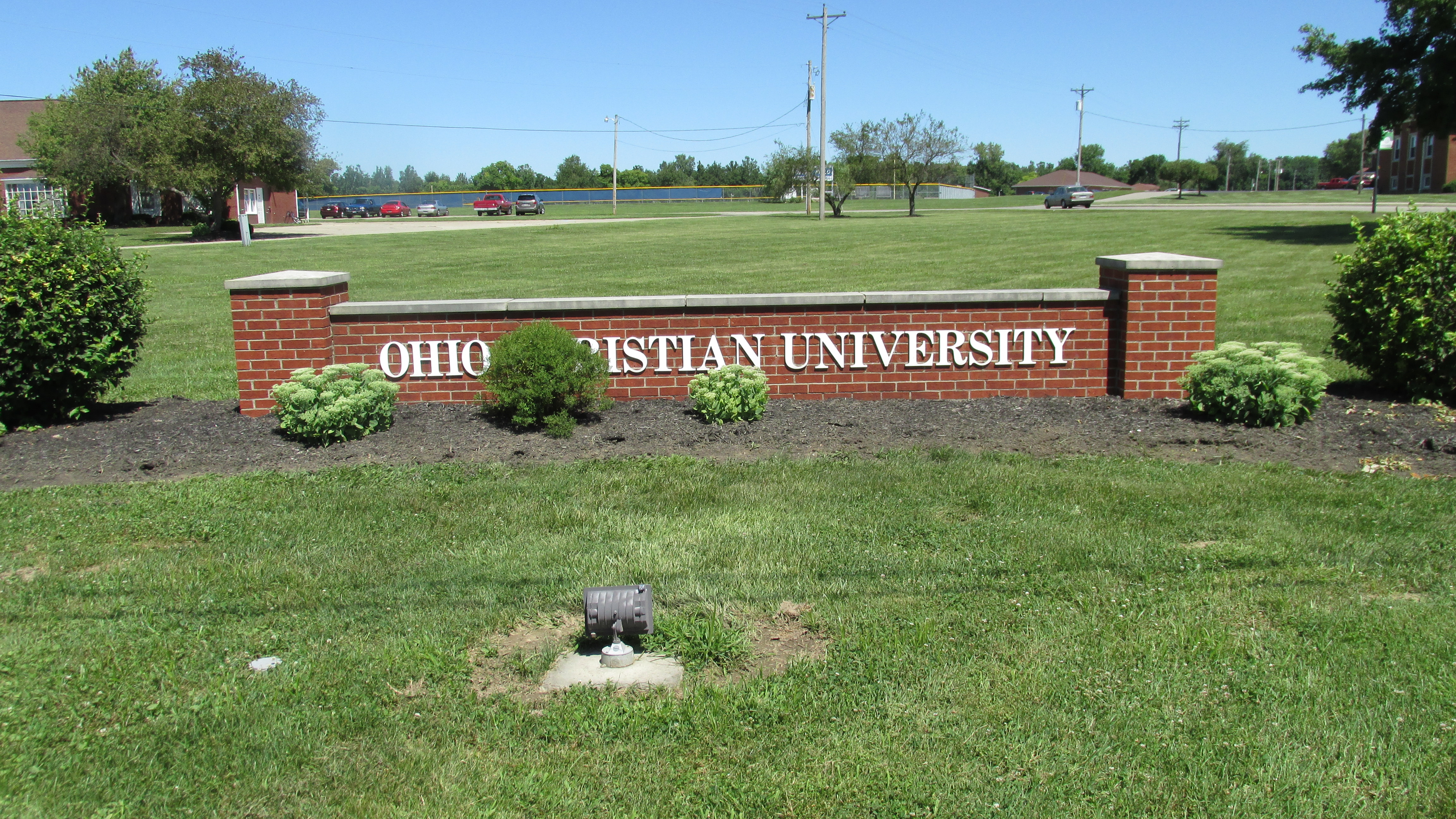
Entrance Sign

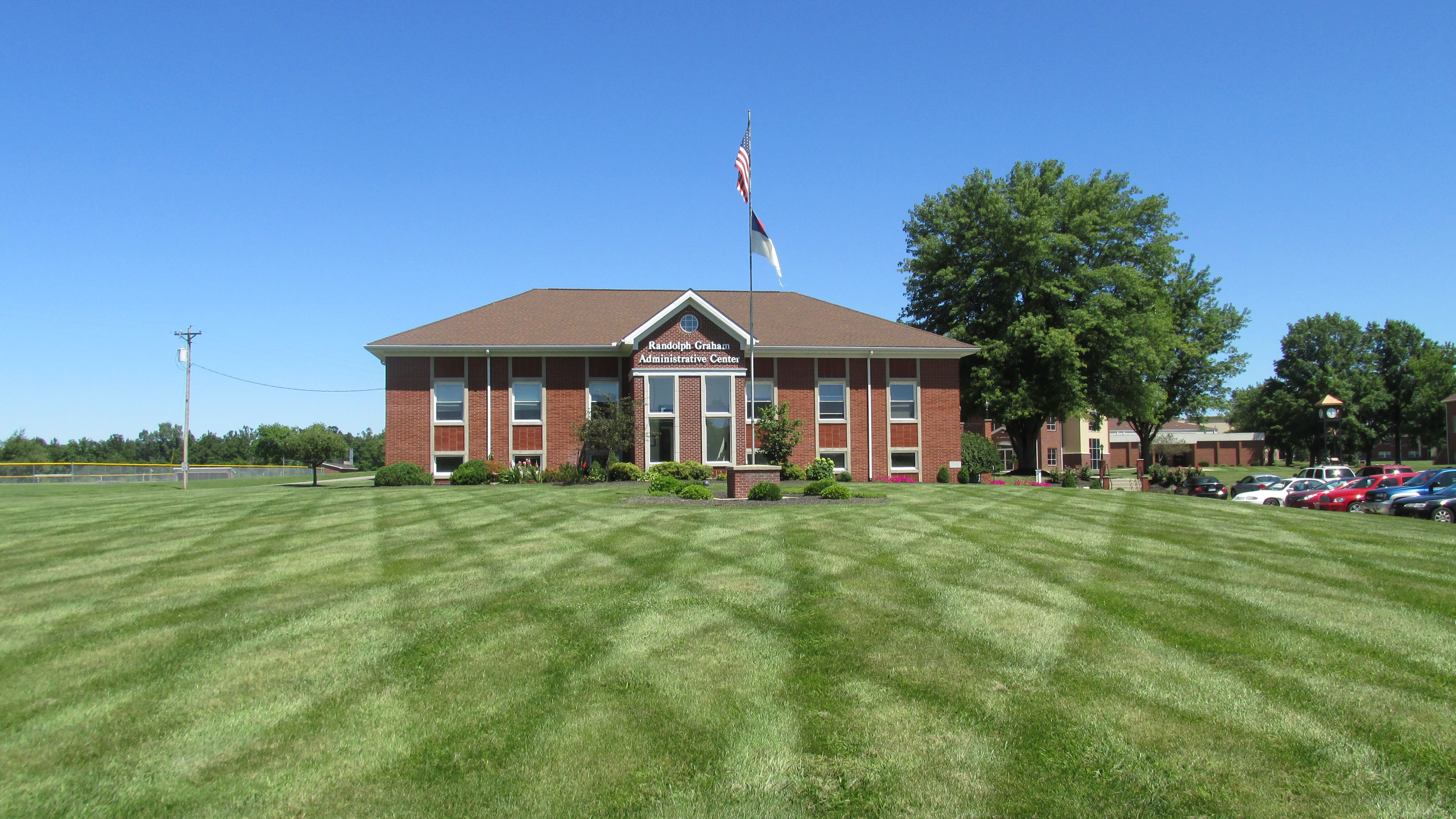
Randolph Graham Administrative Center

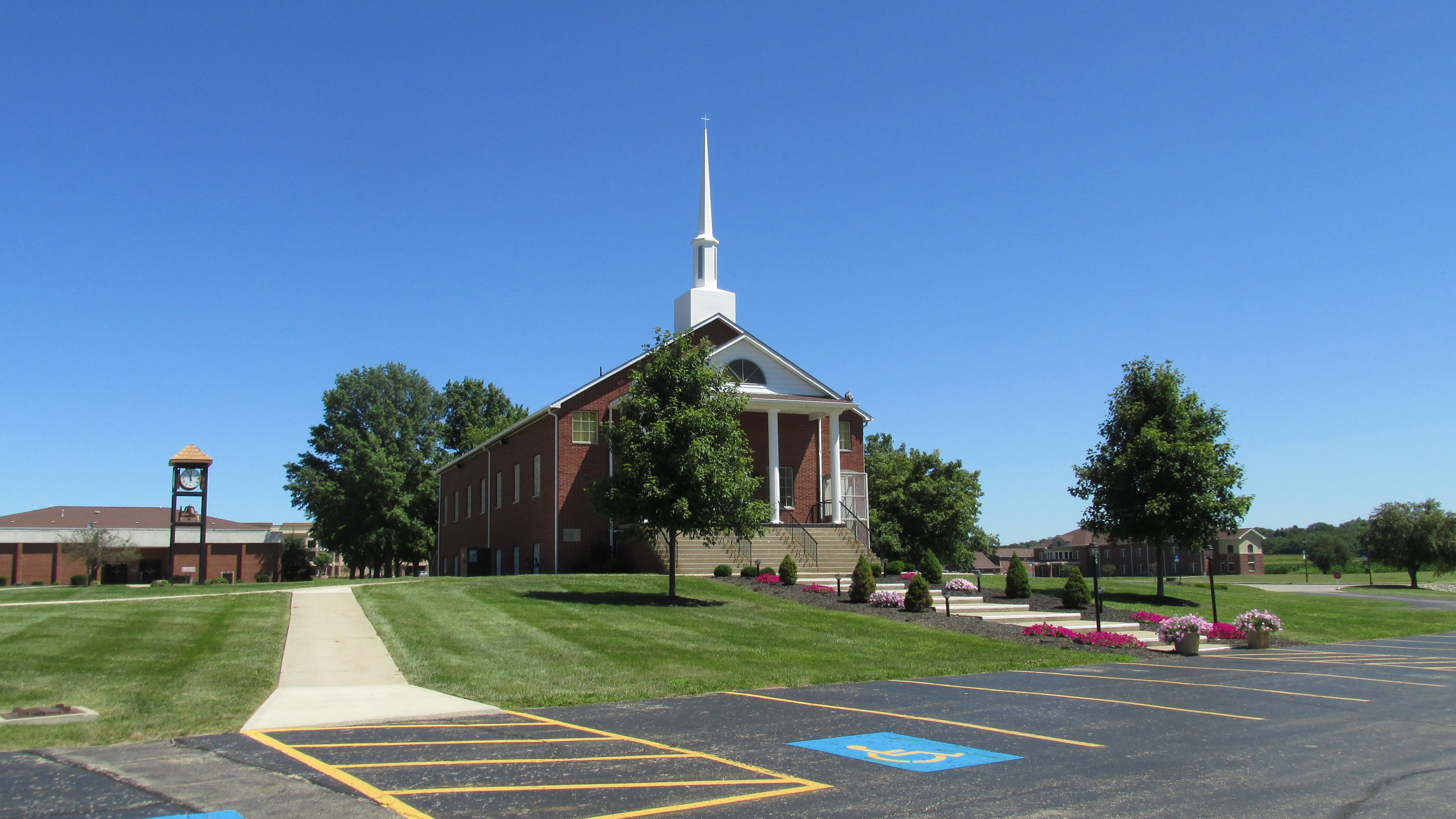
Floyd and Gladys Detty Chapel

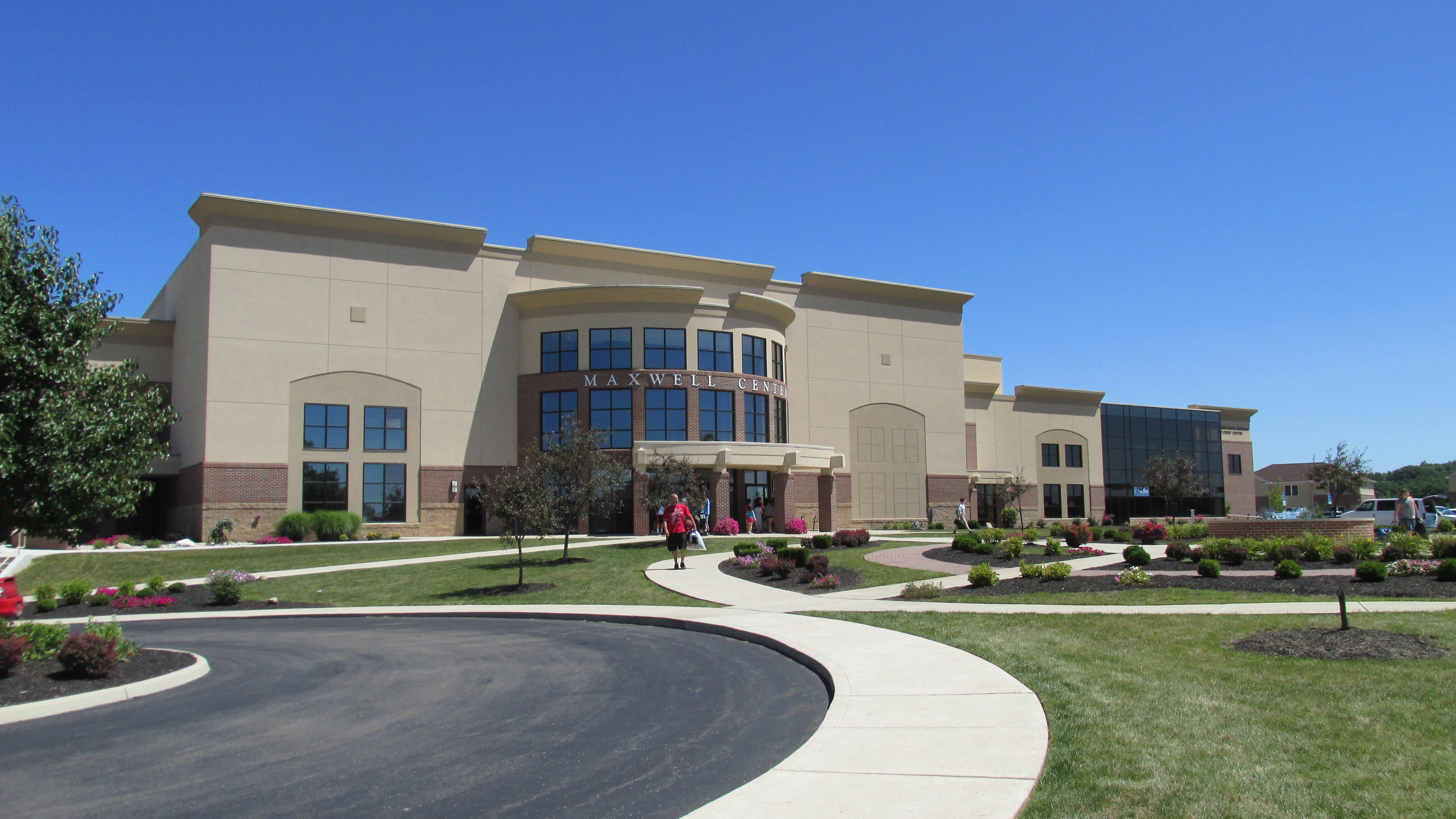
Maxwell Center

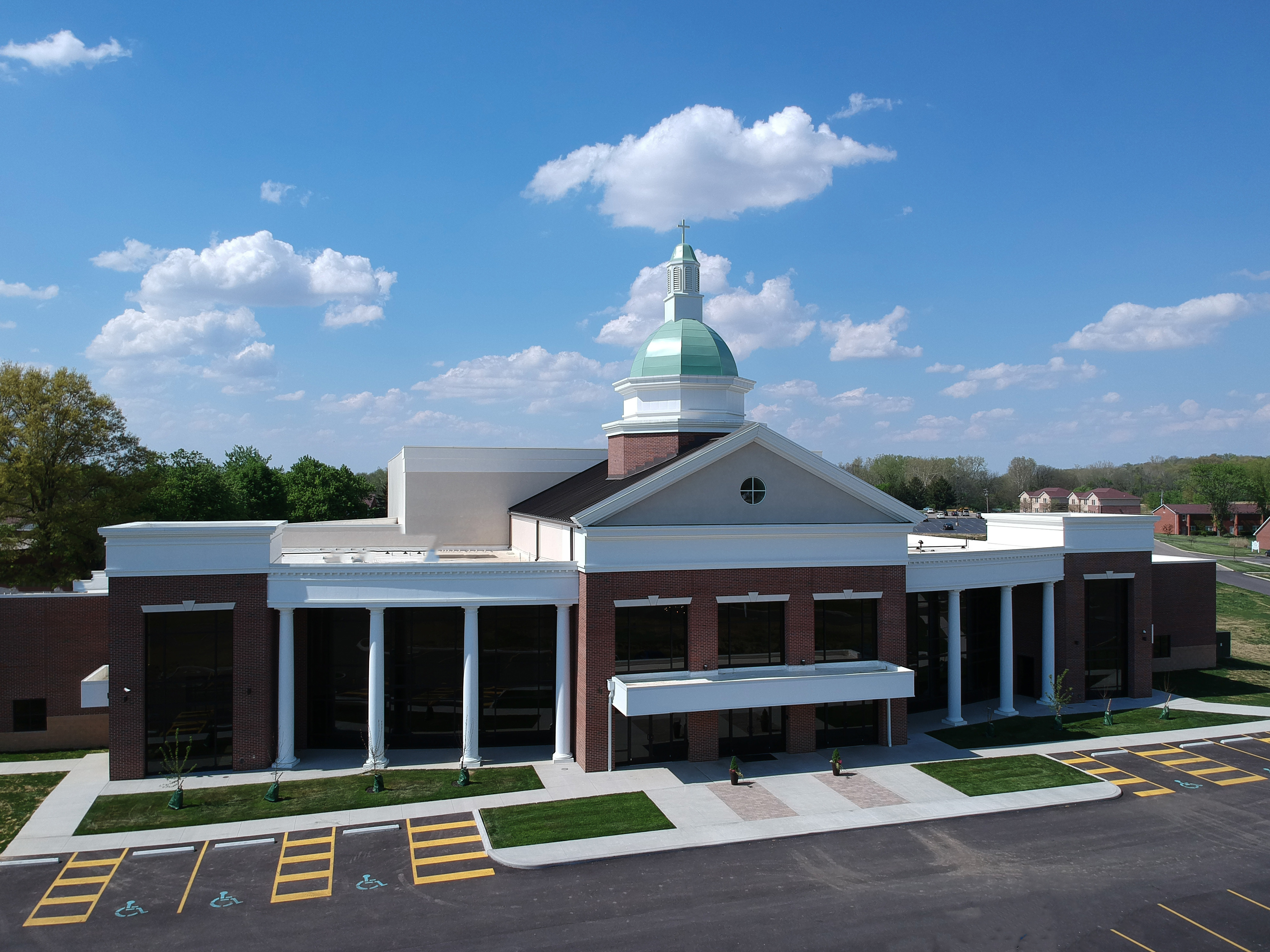
Ministry & Performing Arts Center

== Academics ==
Academic rankings

Master's
- Washington Monthly: 587 of 604

Regional
- U.S. News & World Report: 148 of 149

The school offers the Bachelor of Arts, Associate of Arts, and Master of Arts in professional fields of study. It also offers an Adult and Online Degree Program.

Ohio Christian University's Adult and Online Degree Programs offer associate, bachelor's, and master's degrees.

== Accreditation ==
The university is accredited by the Higher Learning Commission. It is also accredited by the Association for Biblical Higher Education and recognized by the Churches of Christ in Christian Union, Primitive Methodist Church, Evangelical Church, and Evangelical Methodist Church for ministerial training.

== Student life ==
The Student Involvement Council (SIC) offers activities throughout the school year. A popular activity is midnight breakfast, an event scheduled at the beginning of final examinations week, catered by favorite staff and faculty.

Chapel is housed in the Ministry & Performing Arts Center and is offered twice weekly (Tuesday and Thursday mornings). Students come to worship with a live student band and hear a message by professors or special guest speakers. There is a required number of times that every student must attend chapel while enrolled at Ohio Christian.

== Athletics ==
The Ohio Christian athletic teams are called the Trailblazers. The university is a member of the National Christian College Athletic Association (NCCAA), competing as an independent in the Mideast Region at the Division I level. The Trailblazers previously competed in the River States Conference (RSC; formerly known as the Kentucky Intercollegiate Athletic Conference (KIAC) until after spring 2016) of the National Association of Intercollegiate Athletics (NAIA) from 2015–16 to 2023–24.

OCU competes in 19 intercollegiate varsity teams: Men's sports include baseball, basketball, cross country, golf, soccer, and track & field (indoor and outdoor); while women's sports include basketball, cross country, golf, soccer, softball, track & field (indoor and outdoor) and volleyball; and co-ed sports include disc golf and eSports. OCU plans to add women's swimming for the 2025/2026 academic year.

== Notable alumni ==
- Jaron Crane, member of the Idaho House of Representatives
- John C. Maxwell, author and leadership coach
- Stan Toler, former general superintendent of the Church of the Nazarene
