= Brandon Hixon =

American politician

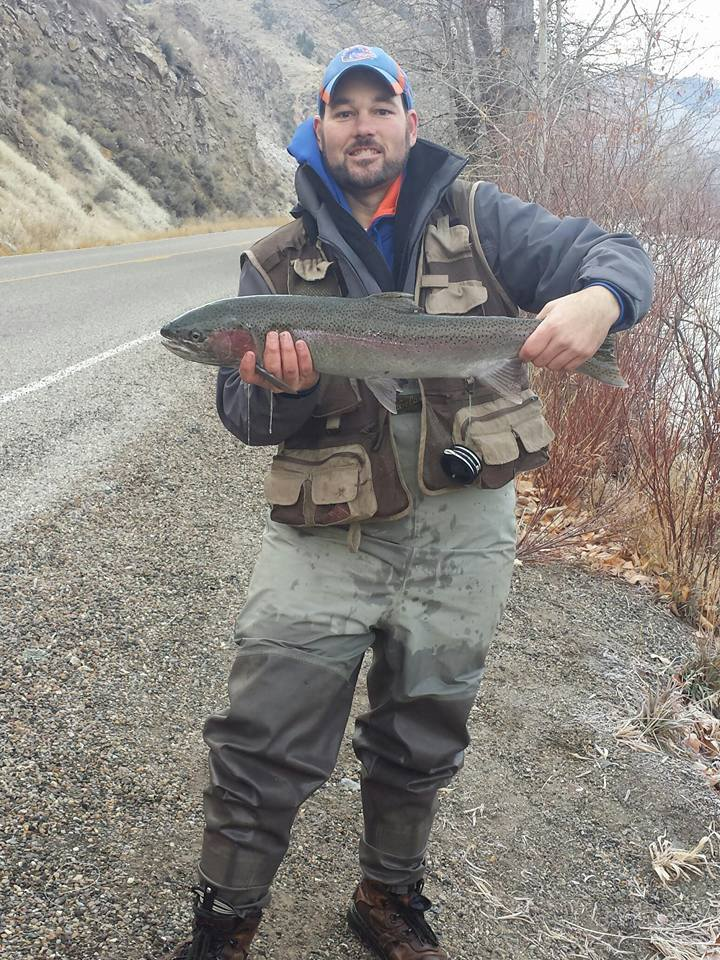

Member of the Idaho House of Representatives from District 10 Seat A
- In office December 1, 2012 – October 19, 2017
- Preceded by: Gayle Batt
- Succeeded by: Jarom Wagoner

Personal details
- Born: Brandon Antone Hixon; October 26, 1981 Salmon, Idaho, U.S.
- Died: January 9, 2018 (aged 36) Caldwell, Idaho, U.S.
- Cause of death: Suicide by gunshot
- Party: Republican
- Children: 5
- Education: Idaho State University; Boise State University

Brandon Antone Hixon (October 26, 1981 – January 9, 2018) was an American politician and an Idaho Republican Party member of the Idaho House of Representatives from 2012 to 2017, representing District 10, Seat A. He resigned in late 2017 while under criminal investigation and killed himself in January 2018.

== Education ==
Hixon, a fourth-generation Idahoan, was born in 1981 and raised in Salmon, Idaho. He graduated from Salmon High School. He went on to graduate from Idaho State University with a degree in construction management.

== Elections ==
=== 2012 ===
Hixon ran against Jarom Wagoner for the Republican nomination winning with 51.5% of the vote.

Hixon won on the November 6, 2012, general election with 6,677 votes (54.0%) against Democratic nominee Travis Manning.

=== 2014 ===
Hixon was unopposed in the May Republican primary.

Hixon defeated Manning again, winning with 58.9% of the vote.

=== 2016 ===
Hixon was unopposed in the May Republican Primary.

Hixon defeated Jeremy Lopett in the general election winning with 67.0% of the vote.

== Criminal investigation and resignation ==
On October 18, 2017, the Caldwell, Idaho, police department confirmed that Hixon was the subject of a criminal investigation. On October 19, 2017, Hixon submitted his letter of resignation via email to House Speaker Scott Bedke and Governor Butch Otter, effective immediately. On October 26, 2017, the Caldwell Police Department turned the criminal investigation over to the Idaho Attorney General's Office. On October 31, 2017, it was reported that Hixon was under investigation for "sexual abuse allegations" from a police report dated October 25, 2017.

In January 2018, an article in the Idaho Statesman cited police records indicating Hixon was suspected of repeated and protracted sexual abuse of two minor females, one of them a relative. He killed himself before the case was taken before a grand jury and was never charged with any crime.

== Personal life and death ==
Hixon and his wife, Danielle, had five children. They divorced in 2016. Not all of his children were with his wife, Danielle. In 2004 and 2005 Brandon fathered two children with Ashley Jo Graham, to whom he was never married.

On January 9, 2018, a family member found Hixon dead from a self-inflicted gunshot wound to the head at his home in Caldwell, Idaho. He was 36 years old.
