= Nampa Christian Schools =

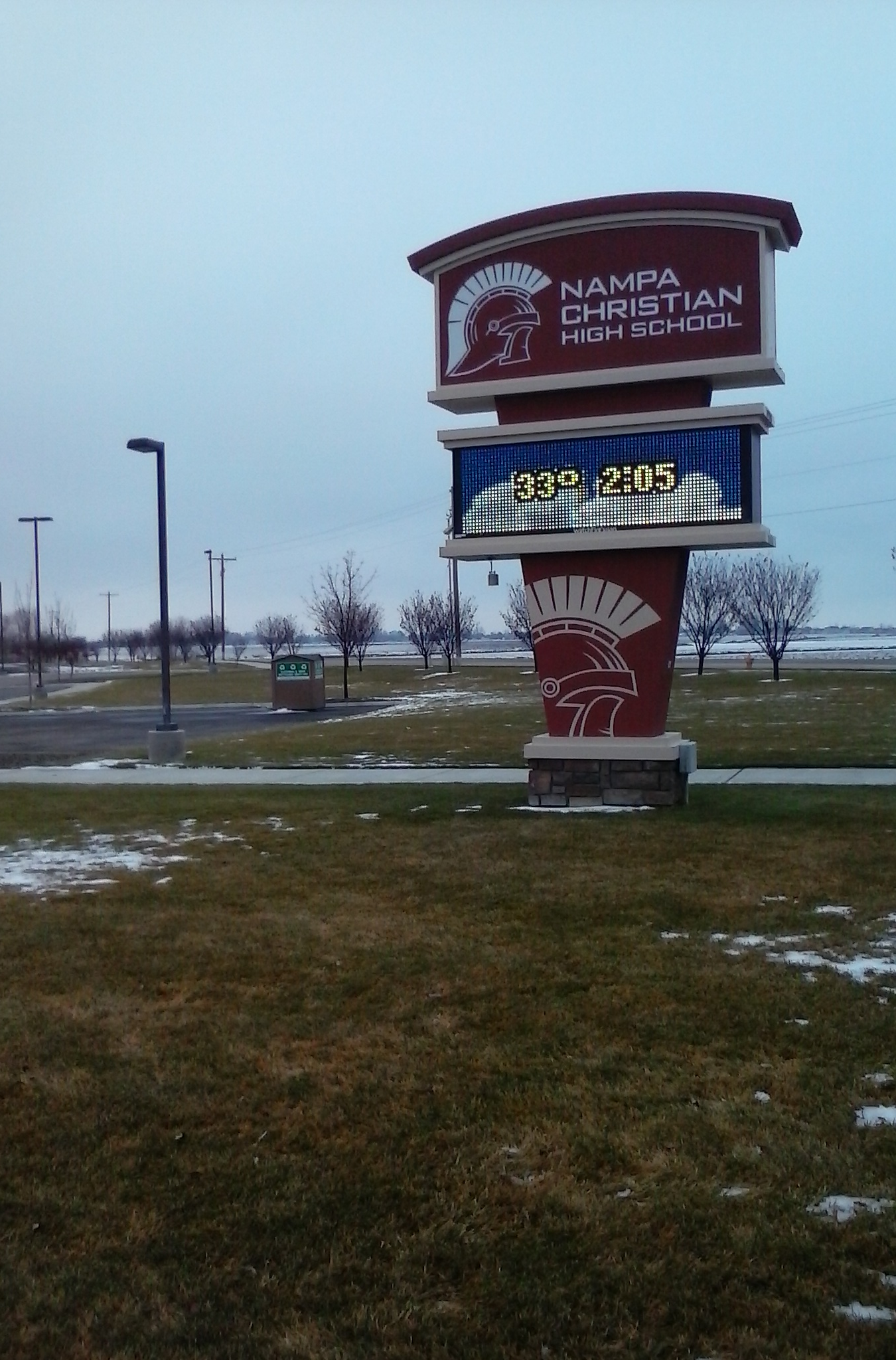

Location
- 11920 West Flamingo Avenue; Nampa, Idaho 83651; United States
- Coordinates: 43°35′24″N 116°35′09″W

Information
- Type: Private Christian
- Principal: Jim Eisentrager
- Faculty: 35
- Grades: K-12
- Enrollment: 733
- Colors: Maroon, Gold, and Silver
- Mascot: Trojans
- IHSAA Division: 2A
- Rival: Cole Valley Christian Schools
- Website: Nampa Christian Schools

Nampa Christian Schools is a private K-12 Christian school in Nampa, Idaho.

== New high school ==
In January 2008 a new high school building was completed and occupied. Located on the corner of Midway and Flamingo the high school is approximately 2 miles from the previous campus which is still used by the elementary.
