= Idaho Department of Agriculture =

State agency in Idaho, United States

Idaho State Department of Agriculture

Agency overview
- Formed: 1919
- Jurisdiction: Government of Idaho
- Headquarters: 2270 Old Penitentiary Rd; Boise, Idaho; 43.60274°N 116.16571°W
- Agency executive: Director, Chanel Tewalt
- Website: agri.idaho.gov/main/

Idaho Department of Agriculture is a state-level government agency of Idaho, responsible for managing agricultural services and policy. The department tasked with regulating food safety standards, licensing, the Invasive Species Program, and animal industries. The department was founded in 1919. It frequently collaborates with the United States Department of Agriculture and Bureau of Land Management.

== Divisions ==
- Director's Office - Celia Gould - Rule making, Legislation, Public affairs, and FSMA.
- Agricultural Inspections - Jared Stuart - Fresh fruit and vegetable inspection, grading, weights and measures, warehousing, and organic programs.
- Agricultural Resources - Victor Mason - Pesticides and chemigation, compliance.
- Animal Industries (Farm & Ranch) - Dr. Scott Leiblse - Livestock regulation and monitoring; dairy inspection, range programs, health, CAFO inspections, domestic cervidae
- Bureau of Laboratories - Dan Salmi - Animal health, Dairy, Feed and Fertilizer, IFQAL (Idaho Food Quality Assurance), Meteorology, Plant pathology, Seed labs.
- Market Development - Laura Johnson - International and domestic marketing and promotions.
- Plant Industries - Lloyd Knight - Plant inspection, disease and pest mitigation, noxious weed and invasive species programs.

== See also ==
- Agriculture in Idaho
