= John McGee (politician) =

American politician from Idaho

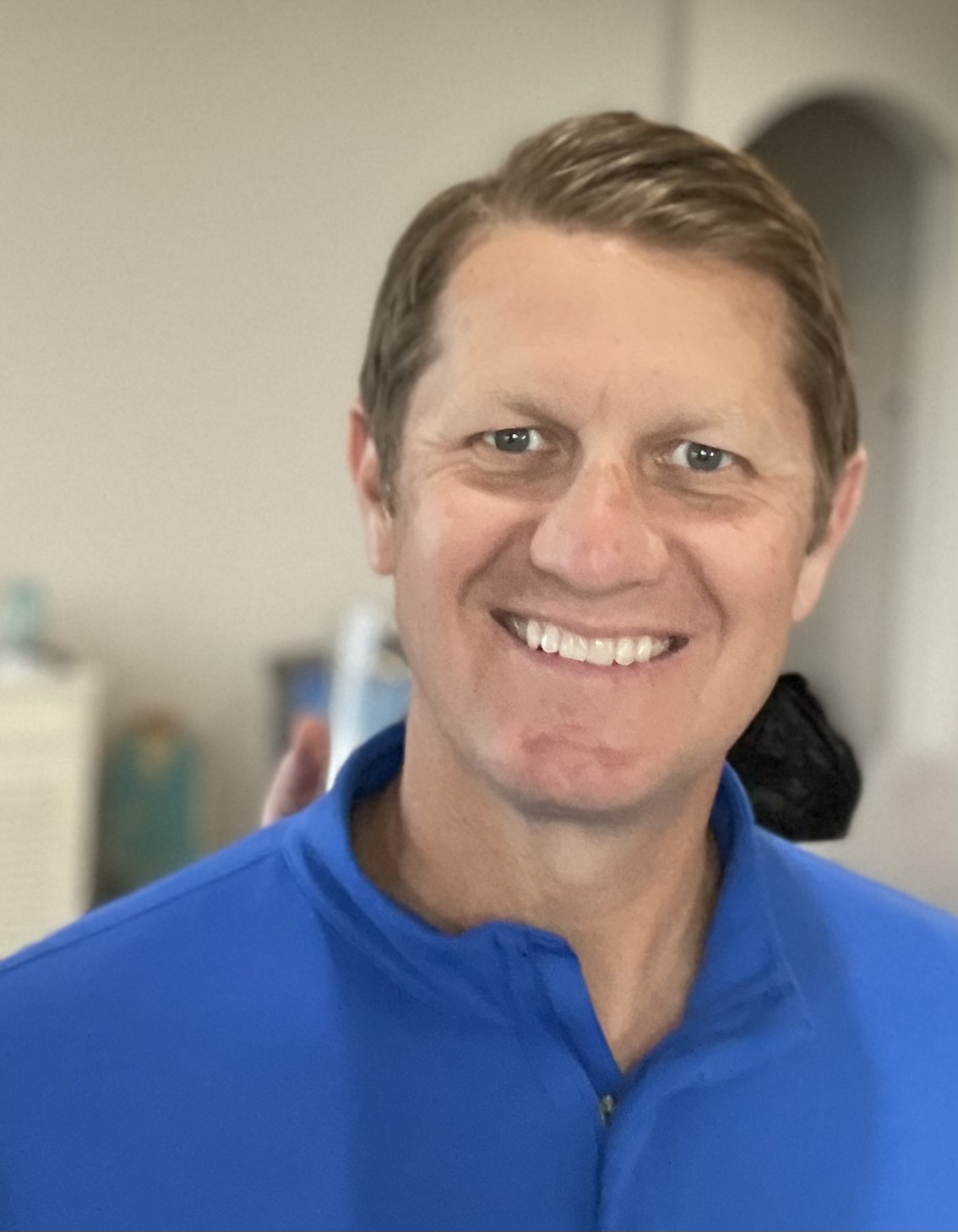

Member of the Caldwell City Council
- Incumbent
- Assumed office January 6, 2020

Member of the Idaho Senate from District 10
- In office December 1, 2004 – February 22, 2012
- Preceded by: Ron McWilliams
- Succeeded by: Jim Rice

Personal details
- Born: January 27, 1973 (age 53) Nampa, Idaho
- Party: Republican
- Spouse: Hanna McGee

John McGee (born January 27, 1973) is an American politician who served as a Republican member of the Idaho Senate, representing the 10th district from 2004 to 2012. He also served as the majority caucus chairman.

He resigned in February 2012 following an accusation of sexual harassment.

== Early life and education ==
McGee was born in Nampa, Idaho and raised in Caldwell. He graduated from Vallivue High School in 1991 and received a Bachelor of Arts degree in history from the College of Idaho in 1995. He was elected student body president at both institutions.

== Career ==
McGee has worked in marketing and public relations for over 20 years and is the marketing director at Caxton Printers in Caldwell.

He was named the 2006 "Idaho State Republican Legislator of the Year." John McGee resigned from the Idaho Senate on February 22, 2012.

McGee was elected as the chairman of the College of Idaho Board of Trustees in 2010. He decided to take a leave of absence in August 2011.

== Elections ==
=== Caldwell ===
==== 2021 ====
McGee was one of five candidates running for Caldwell, Idaho Mayor in the November 2021 election.

==== 2019 ====
In 2019, McGee announced his candidacy for Caldwell City Council. In the three-way race, he defeated both the incumbent, Chuck Stadick and his Democratic opponent, Evangeline Beechler.

Because of the close results, Beechler successfully requested runoff election. Shortly after the runoff was announced, McGee was endorsed by outgoing Governor Butch Otter.

On December 3, 2019 McGee defeated Beechler in the run off with 2,072 votes, or 60.7% of the vote. It was noted by the media that the turn out in the run-off election was higher than that in the general election.

=== Idaho Senate District 10 ===
==== 2008 ====
McGee was unopposed in the Republican primary. McGee defeated Democratic nominee Harold L. Stiles with 72.9% of vote.

==== 2006 ====
McGee was unopposed in the Republican primary and general election.

==== 2004 ====
McGee defeated incumbent Ron McWilliams in the Republican primary with 59.01% of the vote. McGee was unopposed in the general election.

== Legal issues ==
=== DUI ===
On June 19, 2011, McGee had been playing golf at the 2011 Hillcrest Invitational golf tournament and drank at the golf course that night. He later stole an SUV attached to a utility trailer, drove it through a residential neighborhood, and jack-knifed the truck and trailer in a resident's front yard. Ada County police officers arrested McGee for grand theft auto and driving under the influence. At the time of arrest, his blood alcohol content was reported at a .15, compared to the legal limit in the state of .08.

On July 1, 2011, McGee pleaded guilty to misdemeanor DUI. The charges of felony theft and felony operation of a vehicle without consent were later dropped. The court sentenced McGee to 180 days in jail, with all but five days suspended, and three days of community service.

=== Sexual harassment ===
In 2012, McGee was accused by a 25-year-old staffer of locking her in his office and making graphic sexual overtures to her. On February 22, 2012, McGee submitted his letter of resignation to the Idaho Senate.

On August 21, 2012, McGee pleaded guilty to probation violation and a disturbing the peace charge related to sexual harassment that occurred at the Idaho State Capital Building. Fourth District Magistrate James Cawthon sentenced McGee to 44 days in jail for disturbing the peace and 44 days for violating terms of his probation stemming from the 2011 drunken driving conviction.

== Personal life ==
McGee and his wife, Hanna, have been married since 2005 and live in Caldwell with their daughter Madalyn and son, Maxwell.

== Committees ==
McGee served on the following committees:

- Local Government & Taxation Committee
- State Affairs Committee
- Transportation Committee
