= Johnson Flying Service =

US mountain airline (1924–1975) that merged into Evergreen

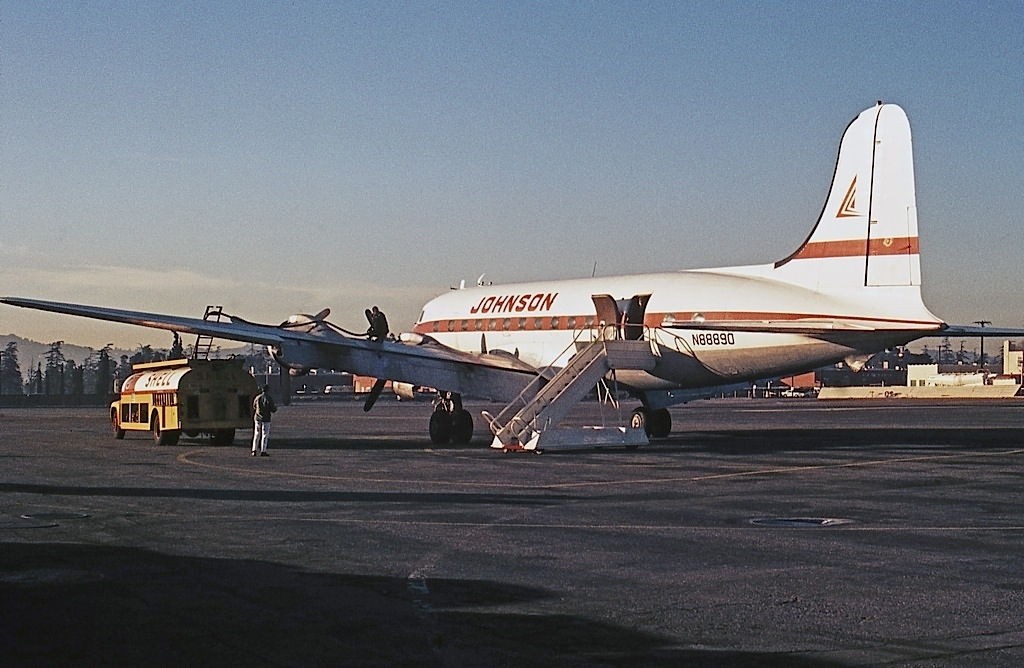
- DC-4 at Burbank 1969
IATA	ICAO	Call sign
JF^{(1)}	JF^{(1)}	-
- Founded: 8 December 1928 incorporated in Montana
- Commenced operations: 1924
- Ceased operations: 2 December 1975 merged into Evergreen International Airlines
- Operating bases: Missoula, Montana; McCall, Idaho
- Fleet size: See Fleet below
- Headquarters: Missoula, Montana; United States
- Founder: Robert R. Johnson; President and majority owner

Notes
- (1) IATA, ICAO codes were the same until the 1980s

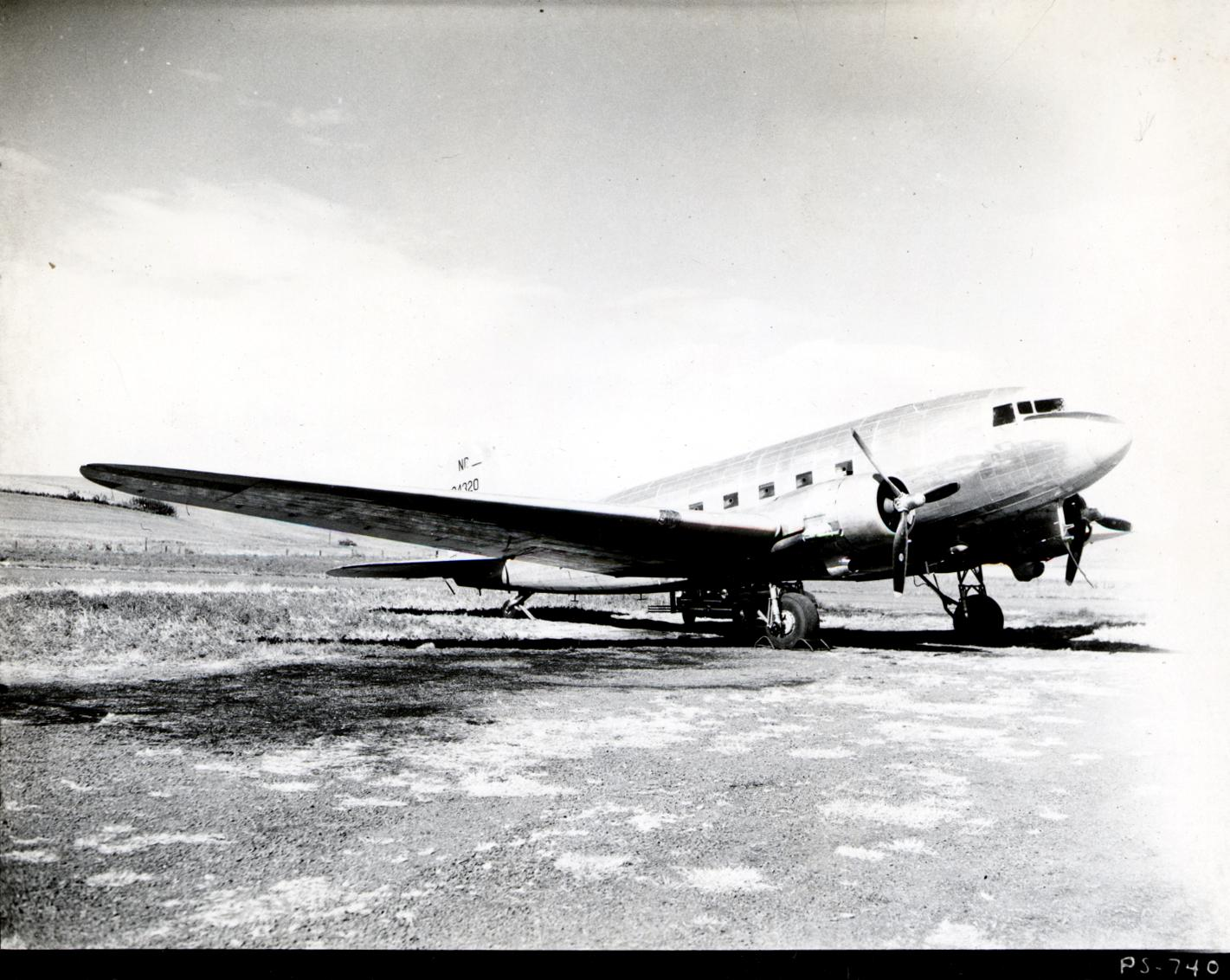
DC-3 on a Northern Idaho pest control project for the USFS in 1947. Same aircraft as in the 1949 Mann Gulch fire and 1954 ditching in the Monongahela River (see below)

Johnson Flying Service (JFS) was an American certificated supplemental air carrier (known earlier as an irregular air carrier or nonscheduled carrier), a type of airline defined and regulated after World War II by the Civil Aeronautics Board (CAB), a now defunct federal agency which tightly regulated almost all commercial air transportation in the United States during the period 1938–1978. From 1964, supplemental air carriers were charter airlines; until 1964, they were scheduled/charter hybrids.

JFS was unusual in that its airline function was ancillary to its main activity of mountain flying, in particular supporting the United States Forest Service with firefighting and other forestry management. JFS was one of the oldest US airlines, dating to 1924. JFS was also notable for the drama surrounding the efforts of its founder/owner, Robert R. Johnson, to sell the business so he could retire. Executive Jet Aviation (EJA) (now NetJets) tried purchasing JFS in 1966, which failed in the controversy of the Penn Central railroad being exposed as EJA's main investor, something illegal at the time. In 1971 the CAB blocked US Steel from buying JFS and turning it into a jet airline. Evergreen Helicopters finally bought JFS in 1975, allowing octogenarian Johnson to retire and creating the certificated air carrier Evergreen International Airlines. For the last 15 months of its existence, JFS adopted the tradename Johnson International Airlines.

The Museum of Mountain Flying was created in Montana in 1993, focused on JFS.

== History ==
=== A unique supplemental carrier ===
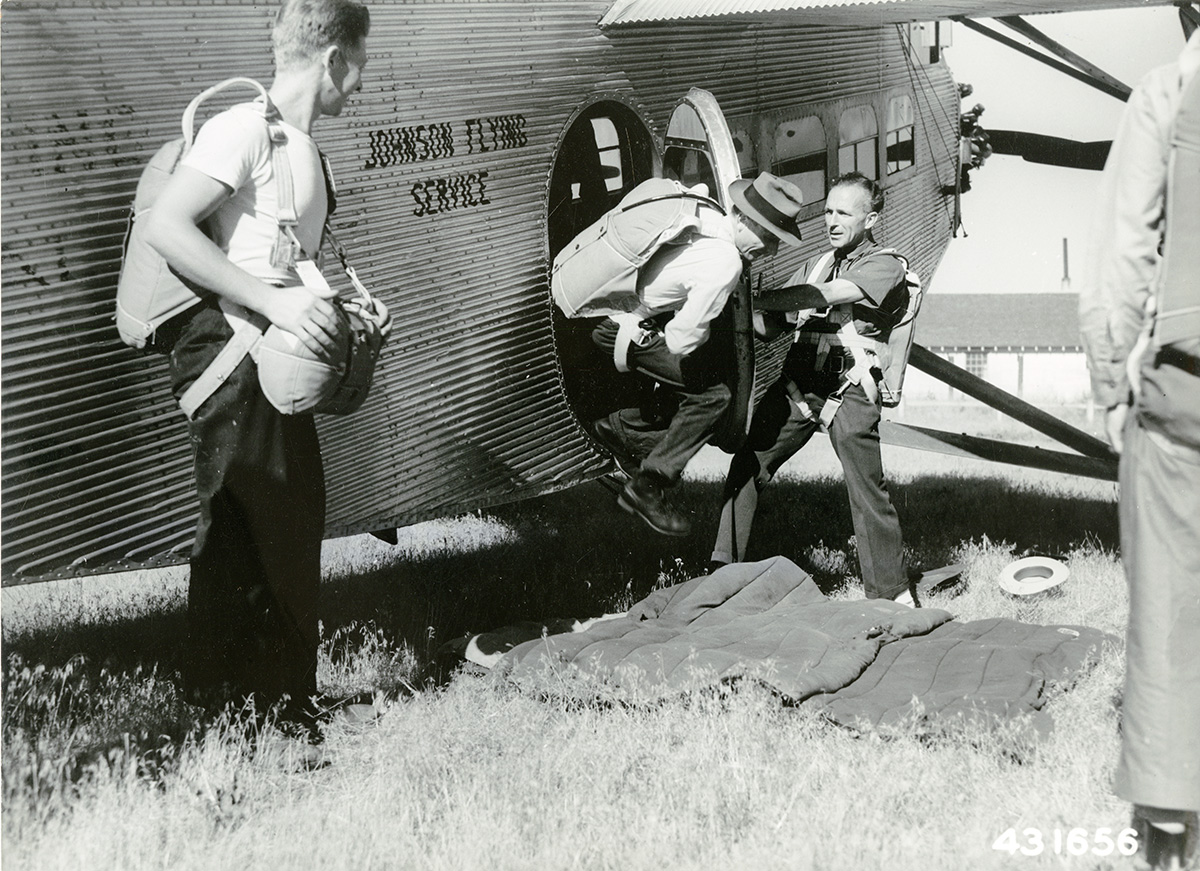
Smokejumpers practicing with Ford Tri-Motor 1945

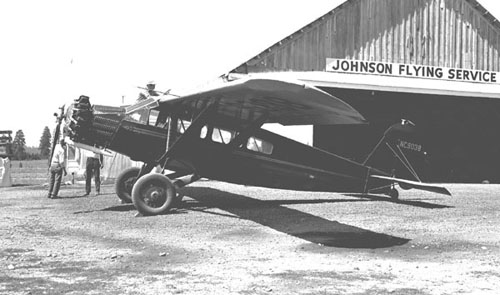
Travel Air 6000 at McCall, Idaho in 1952

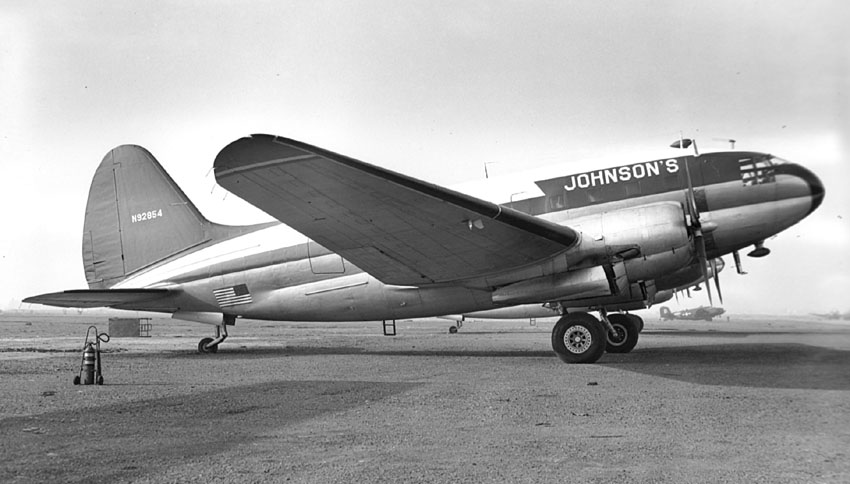
C-46 at Oakland 1953

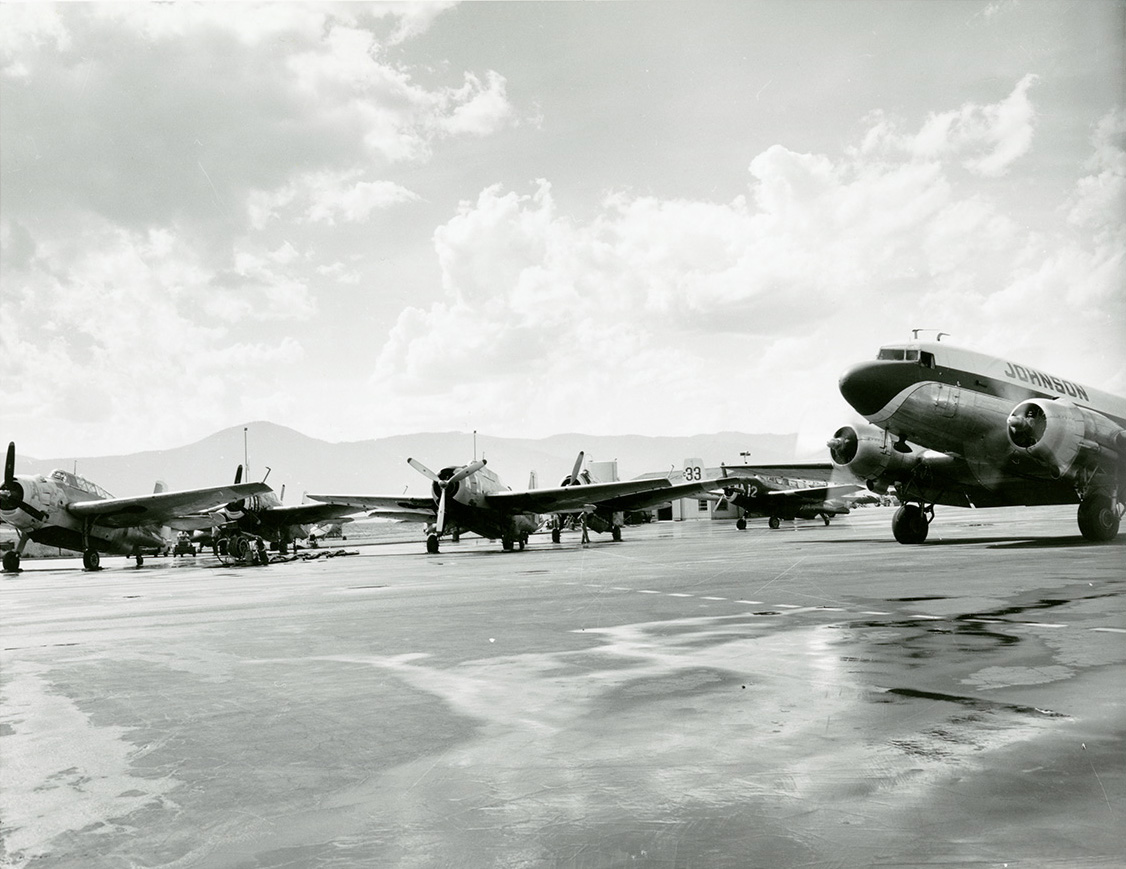
JFS had TBM Avengers used to drop fire retardant: Missoula 1967

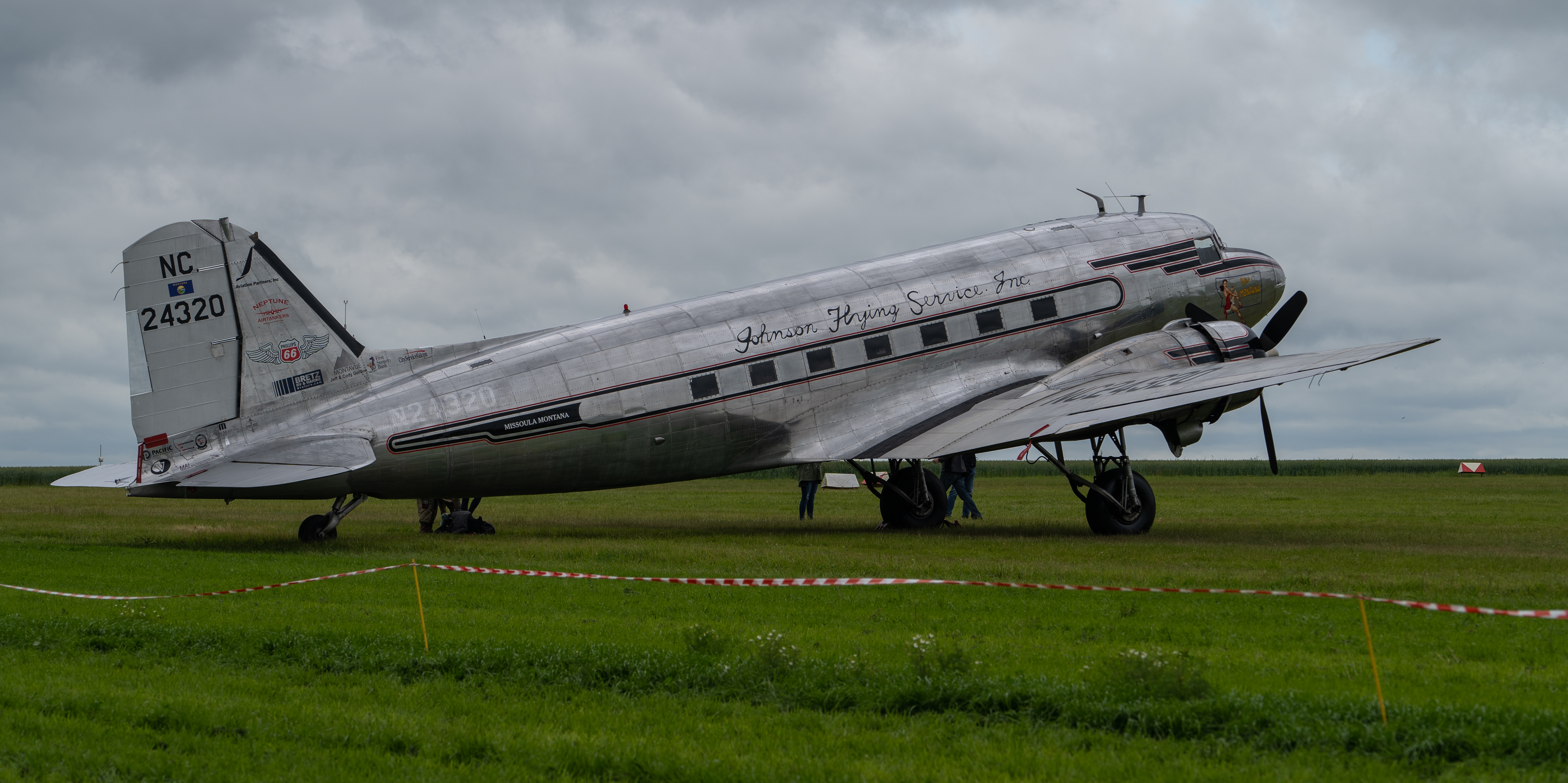
N24320 in 2019, restored. The exact aircraft as depicted above in 1947 and which ditched in 1954

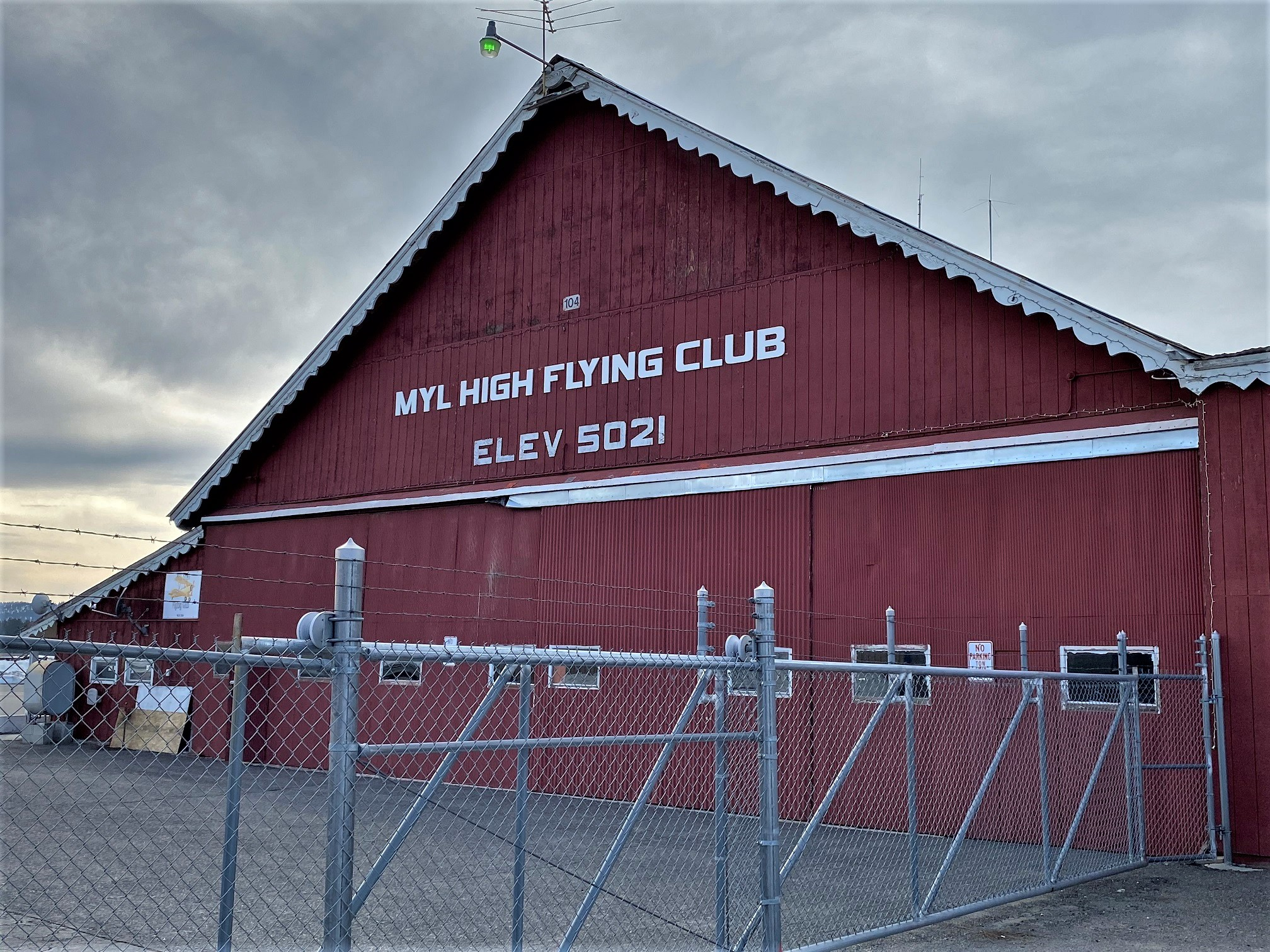
Former JFS hangar at McCall, Idaho in 2021. Compare to the picture of the Travel Air above

Robert R. "Bob" Johnson started Johnson Flying Service as a sole proprietorship in 1924, incorporating 8 December 1928 in Montana. This pre-dated Missoula airport. Johnson would fly sightseeing customers over Missoula for a penny a pound. Most nonscheduled air carriers were founded immediately after World War II as former military pilots bought or leased cheap war surplus aircraft, often just one. By then, however, JFS had already been in business for over 20 years. JFS received its Letter of Registration (what the CAB gave irregular air carriers in lieu of a certificate) on 22 August 1947. On 31 March 1950, JFS owned two Douglas DC-3s, three Ford Tri-Motors and 26 smaller aircraft. Its charter flying was often to ranches or other isolated points, and besides air transportation JFS instructed pilots, trained "aerial fire-fighters" (smokejumpers), sprayed pesticides, maintained aircraft and operated under contract to the US Forest service.

In temporarily certificating JFS in 1962, as required by new legislation, the CAB commended it for its robust financial health, its economical and efficient operation and excellent compliance disposition towards the CAB's regulations. The fleet comprised a Douglas DC-2, Curtiss Super C-46F, two DC-3s, a B-25, a Douglas B-26 and 35 smaller aircraft, including helicopters. Johnson owned 76% of JFS. In 1963, revenue was $902,000, with 82% of that from the US Forest Service and only 7% from passenger air transportation (dominated by flying local college sports teams), zero from the US military, a substantial change from 1953, when 83% of revenue of $713,000 was from passenger air transportation, 26 percentage points of which was military. Military work abruptly ceased in 1955, coincident with the fatal year-end 1954 ditching of an aircraft near Pittsburgh that was transporting military personnel, the investigation of which exposed systemic flaws in JFS's transport program (see Accidents section below).

In 1966, JFS duly received its permanent supplemental certification, again with many complimentary remarks by the CAB as to its operational skill and financial management. After 42 years in business and now in his 70s, Bob Johnson had already taken steps to sell the business. This would take over a decade.

=== Executive Jet Aviation ===
In July 1965, Bob Johnson signed an agreement giving A.N. Thompson the option to buy 100% of JFS for $1.75 million (over $17 million in 2024 terms). Thompson sought funding and in August 1966, Executive Jet Aviation agreed to pay $1.75 million for 80% of JFS, leaving Thompson with 20%, subject to CAB approval. EJA was an ambitious new company with a then-novel business plan allowing companies access to business jet convenience without buying a jet themselves. In the wake of the JFS announcement, EJA ordered two Boeing 727s and two 707s and teed up an order for Lockheed L-500s, a civilian version of the Lockheed C-5 Galaxy, contingent on approval of the JFS acquisition. But a lawyer representing Capitol Airways, another supplemental, discovered EJA's dominant investor was the Pennsylvania Railroad (which in 1969 became Penn Central). It was illegal at the time for a railroad to control an airline, so by 1967, EJA and the railroad were in deep trouble with the CAB. EJA tried to mitigate the issue including a deal to sell itself to a partnership of US Steel and Burlington Industries (which fell through) before finally pulling out of the JFS deal in 1969.

=== US Steel ===
US Steel then cut a deal directly with Bob Johnson to buy JFS on 18 April 1969, the purchase price now $2.25 million (over $19 million in 2024 terms). US Steel's near-term plans for JFS called for re-equipping with three Douglas DC-8-63 jets, to fly mostly domestic cargo but also some passenger flights. First year revenues were projected at $25 million (over $180 million in 2024 dollars) as compared to JFS's annual revenues, which were about $1 million. US Steel owned some small industrial railroads near its steel plants and had barge and other shipping subsidiaries. However, the CAB's main concern was the impact of a substantial new charter competitor in the industry. The supplementals as a group significantly unprofitable, and the CAB found US Steel's revenue projections lack credibility—far too optimistic. In June 1971, the CAB blocked the deal.

=== Evergreen ===
In the early 1970s JFS started to deteriorate. It lost money, it was rebuked by the CAB for failing to file required reports. Part of the issue was acquisition of two Lockheed Electras in 1971, which by 1972, the airline admitted was "not altogether successful". But the bigger issue was age: Bob Johnson had diabetes, a bad hip and high blood pressure and wanted out of the business. In June 1974, Johnson finally appointed someone else president, while remaining chairman. In September, JFS adopted the trade name Johnson International Airlines for its air transport activities.

In February 1974, Evergreen Helicopters made an offer for $1 million, which Johnson said was the first real offer he'd had in three years. The CAB application was accompanied by endorsements from five US senators, a governor, several US House representatives and the US Forest Service. It still took the CAB 18 months to approve the deal, which came in October 1975. Along the way, Evergreen extended interim loans, without which JFS could not have survived, and provided accounting and administrative support. The transaction closed 2 December 1975, thereby creating Evergreen International Airlines. But serious damage had been done: in April 1975, for the first time in over 40 years, the US Forest Service awarded the local contract to a company other than JFS.

== Connections to national security ==
Smokejumping requires great skill, both on the part of the jumper and the aircraft pilot, as the drop zone for the jumper is generally small and the drop is being made over rugged terrain with variable winds. Landing in a tree is common. Smokejumpers are highly conditioned, as they may need to fight fires over mountains for days with limited or no support and will generally have to pack out their own equipment, 90 lbs or more.

Highly conditioned people who can parachute into a tight space with a heavy pack in rugged territory and survive on their own for days are of interest outside of firefighting. The CIA recruited from among smokejumpers and therefore connections developed with Johnson Flying Service. Intermountain Aviation, a CIA "proprietary" airline in the 1960s and 1970s, based in Arizona, had many employees (including its president Gar Thorsrud) who started as Montana smokejumpers or had been JFS employees. Evergreen bought Intermountain on 1 March 1975.

== Legacy ==
JFS left a substantial legacy, especially on the firefighting and forestry side. The US Forest Service still has smokejumper bases at Missoula and McCall airports. Smokejumping continues to be one of the main ways of fighting forest fires. The airfield at Missoula Montana Airport is named for Bob Johnson (Johnson-Bell Airfield).

On the airline side, Evergreen International Airlines was a significant carrier for several decades.

== Fleet ==
At the time of its CAB application (March 1974), JFS had:

- 2 Lockheed L-188 Electra
- 1 Douglas B-26
- 3 Douglas DC-3
- 6 Grumman TBM Avenger converted to drop fire retardant
- 17 smaller aircraft
- 8 Bell JetRanger helicopters

During the CAB proceedings, to raise money, JFS sold at least two JetRangers to Evergreen.

== Accidents and incidents ==
- 5 August 1949: Mann Gulch fire. 12 smokejumpers lost their lives within two hours after jumping from DC-3 NC24320 (same aircraft as 22 December 1954 accident, see below), one of the worst loss of lives in US Forest Service history.
- 22 December 1954: Flight 4844C, a Douglas DC-3 (registration N24320) flying military personnel from Newark, New Jersey to Tacoma, Washington ditched in the Monongahela River near Pittsburgh, Pennsylvania, due to fuel exhaustion near the scheduled completion of the first leg of its flight from Newark to Allegheny County Airport in Pittsburgh. Everyone on board survived the ditching, the 10 deaths (of 28 on board) were due to drowning in the icy waters. Fuel exhaustion was attributed to inadequate flight planning, contributing factors were inadequate crew training and supervision.

== See also ==
- Museum of Mountain Flying
- Supplemental air carrier
- List of defunct airlines of the United States
