= Sharlie (name) =

Sharlie is a nickname that may refer to the following:

- Sharlie, American folklore subject
- Sharlie Rockstar, stagename of Jesús Luna Pozos, who is best known as Charly Manson, (born 1975), Mexican luchador

== See also ==
- Sharlee D'Angelo
- Sharly Mabussi
- Sharli Envieh Takie
- Sharpie (disambiguation)
