= MYL =

MYL could refer to:

- Maryland railway station, England, National Rail code
- McCall Municipal Airport, Valley County, Idaho, US, IATA airport code
- Mind Your Language (1977–1979; 1985), British TV sitcom
- Muslim Youth League, the youth wing of the Indian Union Muslim League
- Mylan Laboratories Inc., NASDAQ symbol
