= Museum of Mountain Flying =

- Location within Montana
- Established: 1993
- Location: Missoula, Montana
- Coordinates: 46.9175°N 114.0780°W
- Type: Aviation museum
- Founders: Stan Cohen; Dick Komberec; Steve Smith
- Website: Museum of Mountain Flying

The Museum of Mountain Flying is an aviation museum located at the Missoula Montana Airport in Missoula, Montana focused on the history of Johnson Flying Service.

== History ==
The museum was founded by Stan Cohen, Dick Komberec and Steve Smith in 1993 following the purchase of 2.8 acres (0.011 km^{2}) of land that was a boneyard of Johnson Flying Service aircraft and buildings. A hangar at the airport was borrowed for a temporary museum until a purpose build structure could be built. In the meantime, the museum acquired a C-47 that had been used to drop 12 smokejumpers who were killed in the 1949 Mann Gulch fire. (Note: A total of 15 smokejumpers were dropped, but the remaining 3 survived.)

The museum moved into its 18,500 sq ft (1,720 m^{2}) R. Preston Nash Jr. Hangar in August 2002. It opened to the public two months later, 19 October 2002, shortly after receiving a 1925 White bus. (Note: The bus was an example of the type that had been built for Yellowstone National Park and later purchased by Johnson Flying Service to transport Montana State University students to Hale Field for flight training during World War II.) The museum acquired a Travel Air 6000 that had previously been owned by Johnson Flying Service in 2013. The following May a Bell 47G that was built from parts was donated to the museum and a J-3 was added seven months after that.

In June 2018, the museum began preparing its C-47 for a flight to France as part of a flyover for the 75th anniversary of the Invasion of Normandy. As the airplane was not yet airworthy, the museum purchased another DC-3 in March 2019 for flight training.

In 2021, the museum announced it would open a new location at the Stevensville Airport and that it had acquired a Howard DGA-11.

The museum's C-47 would be named the state plane of Montana in May 2023.

In October 2024, the museum announced it would be opening a branch at Glacier Park International Airport in Kalispell, Montana that would include an aircraft maintenance technician training program. The following month, it was revealed that museum had acquired an A-26 that had been used in the movie Always.

== Collection ==
=== Aircraft ===
- Beechcraft JRB-1
- Bell 47G-3B-1
- Bell HH-1H Iroquois
- Brown Sportster
- Douglas C-47A Skytrain
- Douglas DC-3A
- General Motors TBM-3 Avenger
- Howard DGA-11
- Piper J-3 Cub
- Stinson 108-1
- Travel Air 6000

=== Ground vehicles ===
- 1925 White bus
- 1947 Federal truck
- Ford GPW

== See also ==
- Museum of Flight and Aerial Firefighting
