= Donnelly, Idaho =

- City
- Location of Donnelly in Valley County, Idaho.
- Coordinates: 44°43′49″N 116°04′28″W
- Country: United States
- State: Idaho
- County: Valley
- Incorporated: 1914

Area
  - Total: 0.72 sq mi (1.86 km^{2})
  - Land: 0.71 sq mi (1.85 km^{2})
  - Water: 0.0039 sq mi (0.01 km^{2})
- Elevation: 4,869 ft (1,484 m)

Population (2020)
  - Total: 249
  - Density: 305.5/sq mi (117.95/km^{2})
- Time zone: UTC-7 (Mountain (MST))
  - Summer (DST): UTC-6 (MDT)
- ZIP code: 83615
- Area codes: 208, 986
- FIPS code: 16-22330
- GNIS feature ID: 2410346
- Website: www.cityofdonnelly.org

Donnelly is a city in rural Valley County, Idaho, United States. As of the 2020 census, Donnelly had a population of 249.

Donnelly is in the Long Valley of Valley County, on the northeast shore of Lake Cascade (Cascade Reservoir), between the two major cities in the county. McCall is 13 miles (21 km) north, and Cascade is 16 miles (26 km) to the south, via Highway 55. Tamarack Resort is across the reservoir to the southwest. The City of Donnelly, named after a prominent railroad man, was incorporated in 1914.

Donnelly is the world headquarters of the celebrated Donnelly Show Ski Team which was established in 2008.

== Geography ==
According to the United States Census Bureau, the city has a total area of 0.45 square miles (1.17 km^{2}), all of it land.

Donnelly is the gateway community for Tamarack Resort, which in 2014 emerged from foreclosure and restarted recreation activities.

== Demographics ==
Historical population
| Census | Pop. | Note | %± |
|---|---|---|---|
| 1960 | 161 | | — |
| 1970 | 114 | | −29.2% |
| 1980 | 139 | | 21.9% |
| 1990 | 135 | | −2.9% |
| 2000 | 138 | | 2.2% |
| 2010 | 152 | | 10.1% |
| 2020 | 249 | | 63.8% |
U.S. Decennial Census

=== 2010 census ===
As of the census of 2010, there were 152 people, 60 households, and 37 families residing in the city. The population density was 337.8 inhabitants per square mile (130.4/km^{2}). There were 100 housing units at an average density of 222.2 per square mile (85.8/km^{2}). The racial makeup of the city was 94.7% White, 0.7% African American, 1.3% Native American, 1.3% from other races, and 2.0% from two or more races. Hispanic or Latino of any race were 3.3% of the population.

There were 60 households, of which 41.7% had children under the age of 18 living with them, 43.3% were married couples living together, 13.3% had a female householder with no husband present, 5.0% had a male householder with no wife present, and 38.3% were non-families. 35.0% of all households were made up of individuals, and 10% had someone living alone who was 65 years of age or older. The average household size was 2.53 and the average family size was 3.22.

The median age in the city was 32.5 years. 30.9% of residents were under the age of 18; 8.5% were between the ages of 18 and 24; 29% were from 25 to 44; 23% were from 45 to 64; and 8.6% were 65 years of age or older. The gender makeup of the city was 51.3% male and 48.7% female.

=== 2000 census ===
As of the census of 2000, there were 138 people, 55 households, and 32 families residing in the city. The population density was 514.0 inhabitants per square mile (198.5/km^{2}). There were 72 housing units at an average density of 268.2 per square mile (103.6/km^{2}). The racial makeup of the city was 93.48% White, 2.17% Native American, 0.72% Asian, 2.90% from other races, and 0.72% from two or more races. Hispanic or Latino of any race were 3.62% of the population. 20.2% were of American, 14.9% German, 14.0% English and 7.0% Italian ancestry according to Census 2000.

There were 55 households, out of which 30.9% had children under the age of 18 living with them, 41.8% were married couples living together, 9.1% had a female householder with no husband present, and 41.8% were non-families. 23.6% of all households were made up of individuals, and 9.1% had someone living alone who was 65 years of age or older. The average household size was 2.51 and the average family size was 3.22.

In the city, the population was spread out, with 24.6% under the age of 18, 8.0% from 18 to 24, 32.6% from 25 to 44, 23.2% from 45 to 64, and 11.6% who were 65 years of age or older. The median age was 38 years. For every 100 females, there were 97.1 males. For every 100 females age 18 and over, there were 92.6 males.

The median income for a household in the city was $29,583, and the median income for a family was $31,500. Males had a median income of $22,083 versus $15,625 for females. The per capita income for the city was $11,142. There were 33.3% of families and 31.4% of the population living below the poverty line, including 30.0% of under eighteens and 25.0% of those over 64.

== Education ==
McCall-Donnelly School District is the local school district. Students are at Donnelly Elementary School, Payette Lakes Middle School in McCall, and McCall-Donnelly High School in McCall.

In 2024, as a result of the Idaho State Legislature's House Bill 710, Donnelly Public Library became the first "adults-only" public library in the state in an attempt to comply with new restrictions on primarily LGBTQ- and sex education-themed materials.

== Highways ==
- SH-55 - Payette River Scenic Byway

Donnelly is approximately 85 miles (137 km) north of Boise, accessed via State Highway 55, the Payette River Scenic Byway, a designated national scenic byway. It heads north from Eagle in Ada County to Horseshoe Bend in Boise County, and climbs the whitewater of the Payette River to Cascade and Donnelly. SH-55 continues north to McCall, where it turns west at Payette Lake and continues to New Meadows in Adams County, ending at the junction with US-95.
