= Neptune Aviation =

Aerial firefighting company

Neptune Aviation Services Inc.
- Founded: 1993; 33 years ago
- Hubs: Missoula International Airport
- Fleet size: 9
- Headquarters: Missoula, Montana, United States
- Key people: Marta Amelia Timmons, founder
- Employees: 225 (2017)
- Website: neptuneaviation.com

Neptune Aviation Services Inc. is an aerial firefighting company based out of Missoula International Airport in Missoula, Montana. It provides aerial support and firefighting to the United States, Canada, Chile and throughout the world. Founded in 1993, Neptune Aviation is known for aerial firefighting, aviation maintenance, fixed-base operator and air charter operations.

Neptune is registered as a privately owned aerial firefighting company with the National Wildlife Federation, United States Forest Service and Canadian Wildlife Federation. In 2015, Neptune provided aerial support for almost 125 fires, mostly in the Western United States.

== History ==
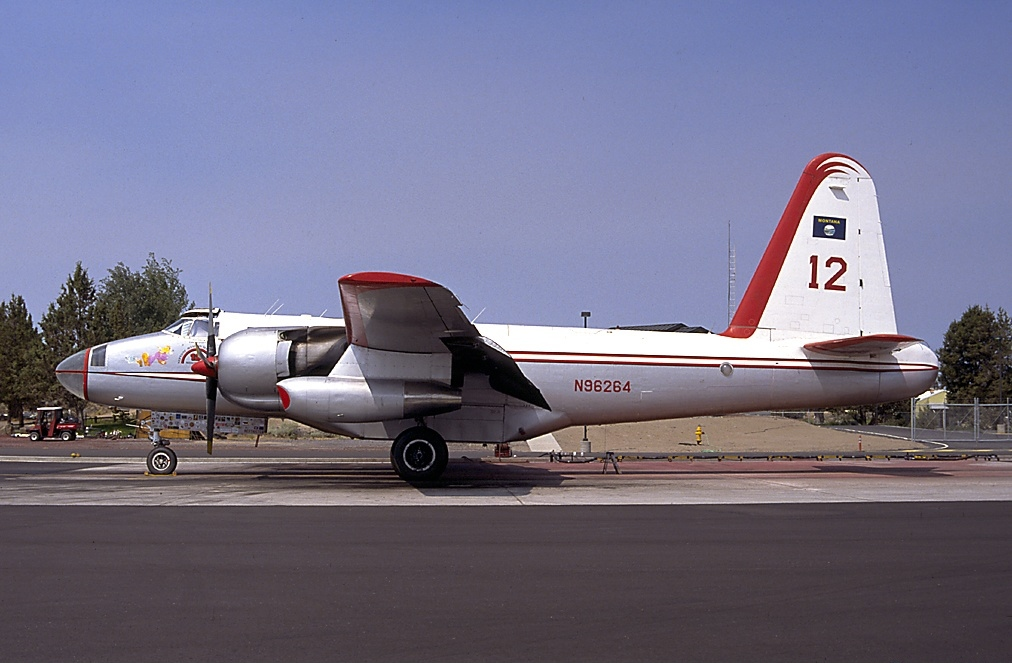
A Lockheed P-2E(AT) aircraft in 2002

Neptune Aviation was founded by Marta Amelia Timmons in 1993 following the purchase of Black Hills Aviation in Alamogordo, New Mexico. Shortly thereafter, operations were moved to their current facilities in Missoula, Montana. Neptune Aviation's primary focus is aerial firefighting and Neptune operates a fleet of nine British Aerospace 146 jet aircraft equipped with the Active Response drop system capable of delivering a payload of 3,000 gallons of fire retardant. Neptune's operations also include Northstar Jet – a Fixed-base operator company offering flight services (fuel, ramp services, maintenance and hangar space), a flight school, Neptune Aviation Charter, Non-Destructive Testing services, and a FAA Part 145 Certified Repair Station (FAA CRS NI6R011N).

At that time during the mid-to-late 90s, 14 aviation services and a nationwide fleet of 44 aircraft, provided aerial firefighting services under 3-year exclusive use contracts with the United States Forest Service. Of the 44, Neptune formerly operated 6 P2V Neptune airtankers.

Since its inception, Neptune has been successful in acquiring and reacquiring airtanker contracts with the US Forest Service. Neptune was the first- ever US operator to contract with the USFS in 2011 for a Next Gen aircraft in the form of Tanker 40, a converted British Aerospace 146. Starting in 2013, Neptune began phasing out its Lockheed P-2 Neptune aircraft and now flies an all BAe 146 fleet.

== Fleet ==
=== P2V aerial firefighting fleet (retired) ===
For more than two decades, Neptune utilized the Lockheed P-2 Neptune to perform aerial firefighting missions for the U.S. Forest Service and various State agencies. Neptune's P2V fleet performed 47,000 firefighting missions and dropped 97 million gallons of fire retardant during this period.

In September 2017, Neptune retired its fleet of P2V aircraft with a celebration that included the last flight of multiple P2V aircraft at the same time. The P2V retirement proved short-lived, as CalFire called two of Neptune's P2Vs out of retirement just seven days later to combat fires raging in California.

Neptune's P2V aircraft found new homes in 2018 in museums around the country. Neptune donated P2V aircraft to the Estrella Warbirds Museum in Paso Robles, California, the T61 Memorial at Crater Lake–Klamath Regional Airport, Klamath Falls, Oregon, Glendive Airport in Glendive, Montana, the Yankee Air Museum in Ypsilanti, Michigan, San Diego Air & Space Museum in San Diego, California, and Missoula Montana Airport (where P2V Tanker 10 is featured at the main entrance to the airport).

Aircraft	Location
N203EV (former Evergreen Tanker 142)	Alamogordo Airport/ALM (Alamogordo, New Mexico)
Tanker 7 (P2V-5)	Estrella Warbirds Museum (Paso Robles, California)
Tanker 5 (P2V-5)	Glendive Airport/GDV (Glendive, Montana)
Tanker 10	Missoula International Airport/MSO (Missoula, Montana)
Tanker 12 (P2V-5)	To be determined
Tanker 6 (P2V-5)	T61 Memorial, Klamath Falls Airtanker Base (Klamath Falls, Oregon)
Tanker 45 (P2V-7)	Yankee Air Museum (Belleville, Michigan)
Tanker 43 (P2V-7)	San Diego Air & Space Museum (San Diego, California)
Tanker 44 (P2V-5)	Neptune Aviation Services
Tanker 14 (P2V-5)	Neptune Aviation Services

=== BAe 146 aerial firefighting fleet ===
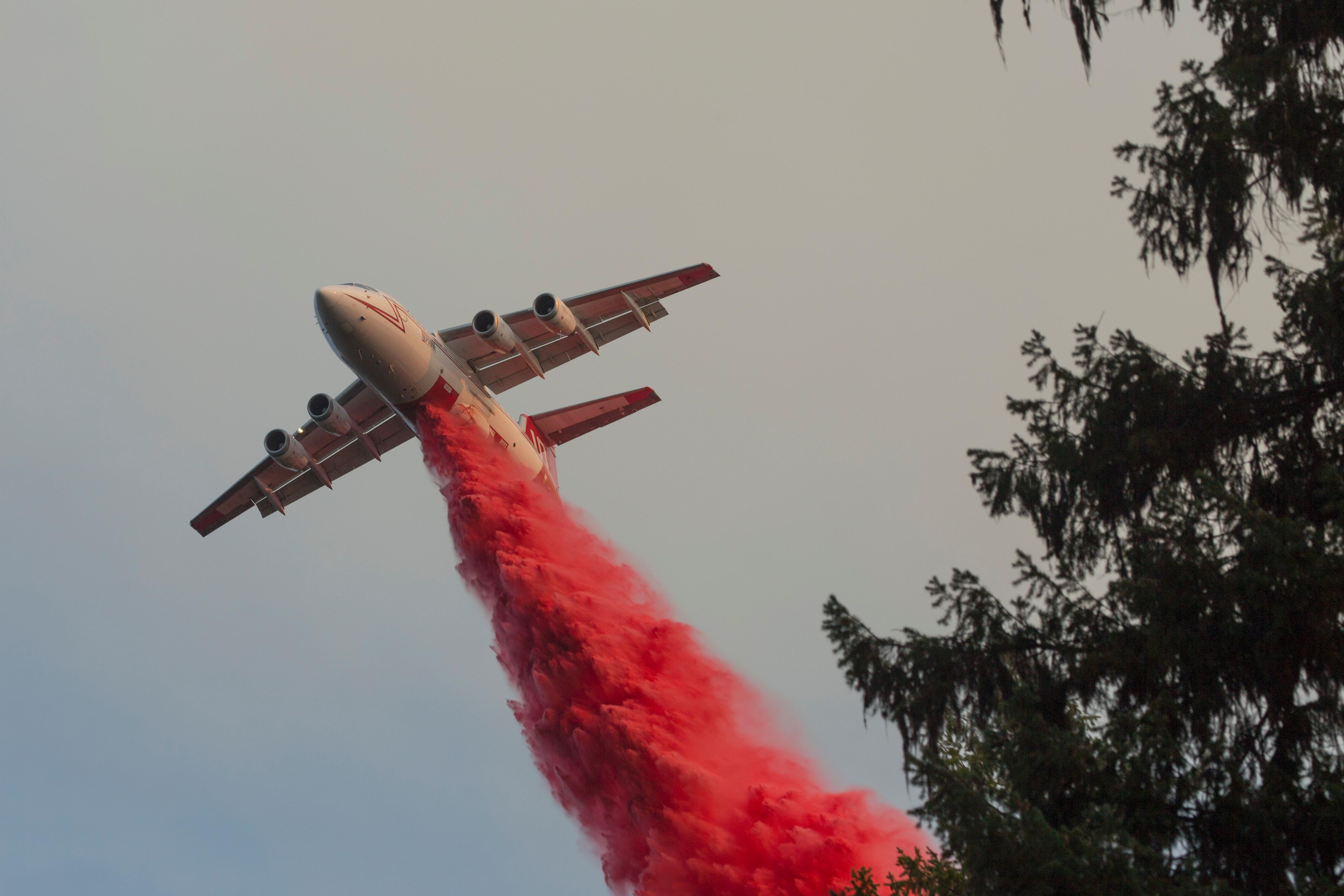
A Neptune Aviation British Aerospace 146-200A drops fire retardant on the Happy Camp Complex Fire in the Klamath National Forest in California.

Neptune Aviation began researching the development of next-generation air tankers in 2007. Neptune's team included experts in aerial firefighting, heavy jet operations, and modifications. After three years of research into aerial firefighting requirements and future direction, Neptune Aviation selected the BAe 146 type for development in 2010. A Supplemental Type Certificate (STC) from the US Federal Aviation Administration for modifications of BAe 146 aircraft to be used for the aerial dispersant of liquids was issued in March 2010. The Interagency Airtanker Board (IAB) approved Neptune's use of the BAe 146 for agency use in 2016.

As the U.S. Forest Service looked for next-generation aircraft to replace older aircraft like the P2V, Neptune Aviation led the development of the BAe 146 aircraft as an aerial firefighting platform. Neptune's BAe 146 aircraft were the first aircraft that met the Forest Service criteria to qualify as next-generation air tankers, which require the aircraft to be turbine or turbofan powered, be able to cruise at 300 knots (345 mph), and have a retardant capacity of at least 3,000 US gallons (11,000 L; 2,500 imp gal). Neptune chose the BAe 146 as its primary aerial firefighting aircraft because of the 146's reliable slow flight characteristics, high cruising speed and outstanding maneuverability.

Neptune Aviation was the first US operator to contract with the USFS in 2011 for a next-generation aircraft in the form of Tanker 40, a converted BAe 146. As of 2016, Neptune had acquired and converted nine BAe 146 aircraft into aerial firefighting tankers.

Neptune Aviation fleet
Aircraft	In service	Orders	Notes
British Aerospace 146	9 (+1 parts hulk)	—	Pre-owned by various American, European and Asian airlines. The average age of the fleet is 29.1 years (As of July 2017)

== Incidents and accidents ==
- On July 22, 2010 Tanker No. 44 a Lockheed P-2V-5 Neptune was damaged upon landing at Rocky Mountain Metropolitan Airport after a retardant drop on a wildfire in Rocky Mountain National Park. The aircraft overran the runway and the front landing gear collapsed. The undercarriage and gear needed substantial repair. The pilot and co-pilot were not injured in the accident.
