= Sharlie =

Idaho Cryptid

In Idaho folklore, Sharlie (Slimy Slim, The Twilight Dragon of Payette Lake) is the name given to a sea serpent much like the Loch Ness Monster that is believed by some to live in the deep alpine waters of Payette Lake near McCall, Idaho.

The first reference to the sea serpent may be the belief of Native Americans, predating western settlement of the area, that an evil spirit dwelled in the lake.

== Modern history ==
The first documented sighting by western settlers occurred in 1920 when workers cutting ties at the upper end of the lake thought they saw a log in the lake. The “log” began to move.

In August 1944, the serpent was reportedly seen by several groups of people who described it as 30 to 35 feet in length with a dinosaur-like head, pronounced jaws, humps like a camel, and shell-like skin.

In September 1946 the serpent was reportedly sighted by a group of twenty people. Dr. G.A. Taylor of Nampa, Idaho explained that “it appeared to be between 30 and 40 feet long and seemed to keep diving into the water. It left a wake about like a small motor boat would make.”

In 1954 A. Boone McCallum, Editor of The Star News held a contest to name the serpent of Payette Lake. The winning name, “Sharlie”, was submitted by Lelsle Hennefer Tury of Springfield, Virginia. In her letter to Mr. McCallum she said, “Why don’t you call the thing Sharlie? You know – ‘Vas you der, Sharlie?” This was a reference to the popular catch phrase often spoken by Jack Pearl during his old time radio show.

Sharlie was reportedly sighted dozens of times between 1956 and the last documented sighting in 1997.
