= McCall-Donnelly High School =

Coordinates: 44.906°N 116.104°W

- 401 N. Mission St. McCall, Idaho; United States

Information
- Type: Public, four-year
- School district: McCall-Donnelly Joint S.D. (#421)
- Principal: Timothy T. Thomas
- Faculty: 29.15 (FTE)
- Grades: 9–12
- Enrollment: 439 (2023-2024)
- Student to teacher ratio: 15.06
- Colors: Blue, White, & Red
- Athletics: IHSAA Class 2A
- Athletics conference: Western Idaho (WIC)
- Mascot: Vandal
- Newspaper: The Echo
- Yearbook: Ski Tracks
- Feeder schools: Payette Lakes; Middle School
- Elevation: 5,030 ft (1,533 m) above sea level
- Website: McCall-Donnelly HS

McCall-Donnelly High School is a four-year public secondary school in McCall, Idaho, the only traditional high school in the McCall-Donnelly Joint School District, and the largest high school in Valley County. The school colors are blue, white, and red and the mascot is a Vandal.

The school's campus in McCall is at an elevation of 5,030 feet (1,533 m) above sea level, approximately a quarter-mile (400 m) south of Payette Lake.

The school district's territory, and therefore the high school's territory, includes sections of Valley and Adams counties, with 98% of its territory in the former and the remainder in the latter. Its service area includes McCall and Donnelly.

== Athletics ==
McCall-Donnelly competes in athletics in IHSAA Class 3A in the Snake River Valley Conference.

=== State titles ===
Boys

- Soccer (1): fall (3A) 2004 (introduced in 2000)

Girls

- Cross Country (3): fall (A-3, now 2A) 1995, 1996, 1997 (introduced in 1974)
- Soccer (5): fall (3A) 2001, 2002, 2006, 2011, 2012 (introduced in 2000)
- Basketball (1): (A-3, now 2A) 1979 (introduced in 1976)
- Track (2): (A-3, now 2A) 1993, 1995 (introduced in 1971)
