= Evergreen International Airlines =

Charter and cargo airline of the United States (1975–2013)

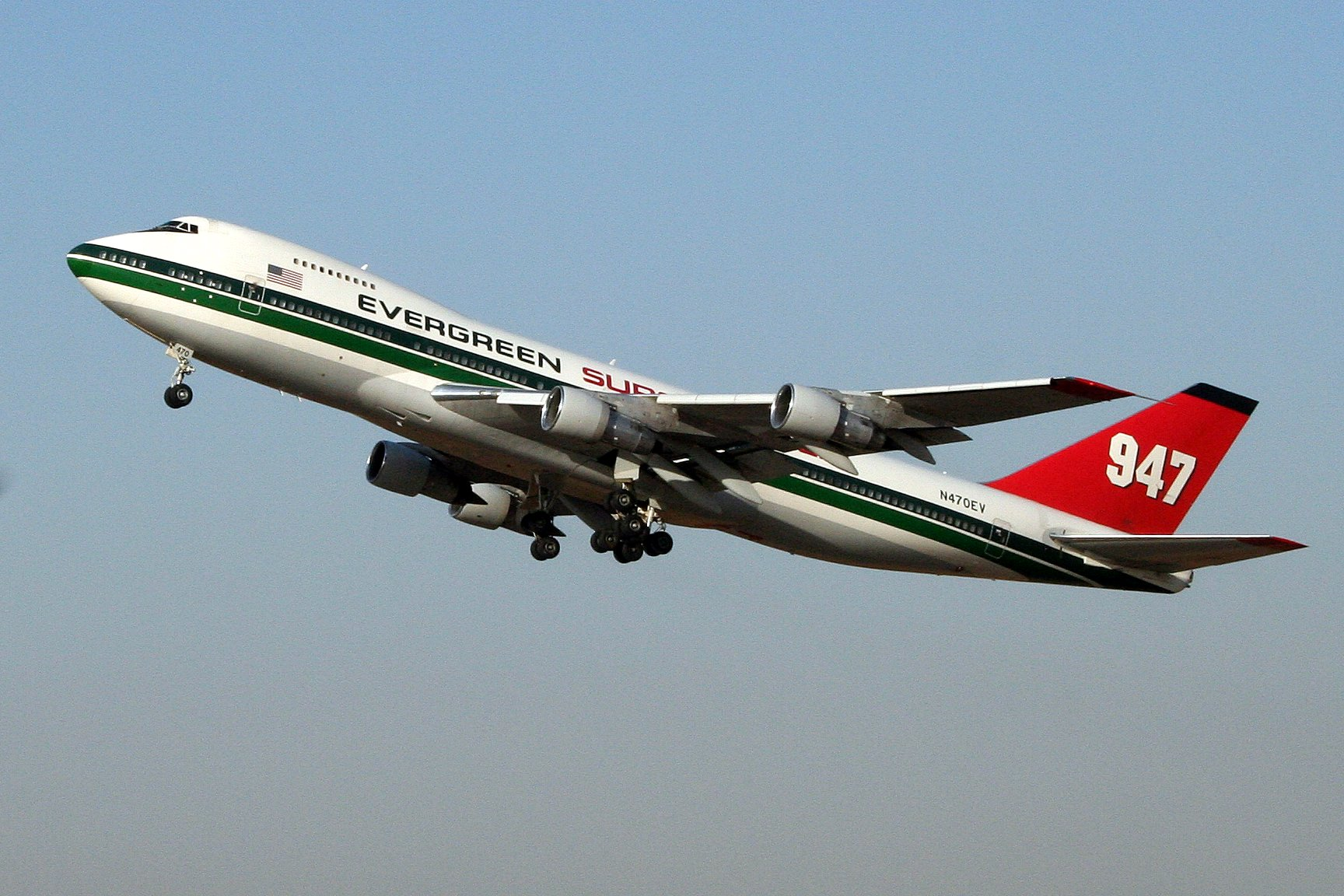
- An Evergreen Boeing 747 Supertanker
| IATA | ICAO | Call sign |
|---|---|---|
| EZ | EIA | EVERGREEN |
- Founded: 1975
- Commenced operations: November 28, 1975
- Ceased operations: December 31, 2013
- Hubs: New York–JFK; Hong Kong
- Fleet size: 4
- Destinations: 11
- Parent company: Evergreen International Aviation
- Headquarters: McMinnville, Oregon; United States
- Website: www.evergreenairlines.com

Evergreen International Airlines was a charter and cargo airline based in McMinnville, Oregon, United States. Wholly owned by Evergreen International Aviation, it had longstanding ties to the Central Intelligence Agency (CIA). It operated contract freight services, offering charters and scheduled flights, as well as wet lease services. It operated services for the U.S. military and the United States Postal Service, as well as ad hoc charter flights. Its crew base was at John F. Kennedy International Airport, New York.

Evergreen also maintained a large aircraft maintenance and storage facility at the Pinal Airpark in Marana, Arizona, that the company acquired from the CIA's Air America operation.

== History ==
=== CIA ties ===
The airline was established by Delford M. Smith (founder and owner) and began operations in 1960 as Evergreen Helicopters. It acquired the operating certificate of Johnson Flying Service and merged it with Intermountain Aviation (a known CIA front) from Pacific Corporation (also a CIA front) in 1975 to form Evergreen International Airlines, a United States supplemental air carrier (i.e. charter carrier). The holding company, Evergreen International Aviation, formed in 1979, wholly owned the airline. Evergreen also purchased the assets of Air America which had provided fixed wing and helicopter support for the CIA in southeast Asia during the Vietnam conflict.

Evergreen served as an Agency front widely over its history:

Wherever there was a hot spot in the world, Evergreen's helicopters and later airplanes were never far behind. Evergreen's hardware was so inextricably linked with political intrigue that rumors swirled that the company was owned by, or a front for, the U.S. Central Intelligence Agency (CIA). Indeed, several of the company's senior executives either worked for the agency or had close ties to it.

Smith never let on, disingenuously telling the Portland Oregonian in 1988, "We don't know when we've ever worked for them [the CIA], but if we did we're proud of it. We believe in patriotism, and, you know, they're not the [Russian spy service] KGB."

Evergreen bought assets during the 1970s that were previously linked to CIA operations including the CIA's aviation 'skunk works' located at the Pinal Airpark in Arizona where Evergreen subsequently performed special maintenance such as servicing the NASA operated Boeing 747 Shuttle Carrier Aircraft used to transport the Space Shuttle. Evergreen subsequently sold the Pinal Airpark facility to Relativity Capital in 2011.

Officially, the company provided "aviation services" for the CIA, including illegal-drug abatement spraying in Mexico and South America and transporting the Shah of Iran from Egypt to Panama, then Panama to the United States in 1980. Shortly thereafter it ran mysterious missions to El Salvador and Nicaragua.

=== As public government contractor ===
Evergreen performed more than military and intelligence community work, also servicing other government agencies in the U.S. as well as in other nations. Its Boeing 747 Supertanker aircraft was used as an firefighting air tanker from Israel to Mexico; its unmanned systems division flew drone flights over disaster zones; NASA hired it to operate its flying infrared observatory; its aircraft supported United Nations peacekeeping operations in 30 countries; flew insect-eradication missions throughout Africa; provided helicopter support for the National Park Service and the U.S. Forest Service; and operated helicopters for FEMA following Hurricane Katrina in Louisiana. Commercially, the airline helped build the Trans-Alaska Pipeline; and developed and serviced the offshore oil and gas market with helicopter support worldwide via its Evergreen Helicopters division.

"All told, Smith said his company flew in 168 countries over the years. 'We were all over the world. Everywhere they needed a helicopter, they needed an airplane as well'", said Smith.

=== Aircraft in film ===
One of Evergreen's Boeing 747 airplanes (registered N473EV, which suffered an in-flight engine separation in 1993) appeared in the 1990 action film Die Hard 2.

A Boeing 727 (registered N727EV) appeared in episode 8 of season 4 of Remington Steele titled "Coffee Tea or Steele".

=== Bankruptcy ===
On November 9, 2013, it was announced that Evergreen Airlines would close on November 30, 2013, due to financial troubles. This information was initially denied by Evergreen, but shortly afterwards admitted: "Evergreen International Airlines flew its last flight Monday [December 2, 2013] Mike Hines, chairman of its parent company board, acknowledged".

On December 31, 2013, Evergreen International Airlines filed a Chapter 7 petition in federal bankruptcy court in Delaware. The bankruptcy filing lists seven entities as submitting the Chapter 7 petition: Evergreen Aviation Ground Logistics Enterprise, Evergreen Defense and Security Services, Evergreen International Airlines, Evergreen International Aviation, Evergreen Systems Logistics, Evergreen Trade, and Supertanker Services.

In June 2014, Evergreen had declared Chapter 7 bankruptcy and began a liquidation of assets, including its headquarters campus in McMinnville.

By the time of Smith's death November 7, 2014, the remains of his once billion-dollar Evergreen Aviation empire had been sold off, shut down, or was in bankruptcy and under investigation by tax authorities.

Between 1990 and its 2013 bankruptcy, Evergreen International Airlines reported approximately 1.6 billion US gallons of jet fuel consumed and $2.4 billion in cumulative fuel expenditures to the Bureau of Transportation Statistics under Form 41 Schedule P-12(a), with peak annual consumption occurring in 1999.

== Destinations ==
Evergreen International Airlines operated the following freight services (as of December 2012):

- Domestic scheduled destinations: Anchorage, New York, Chicago.
- International scheduled destinations: Tokyo, Nagoya, Hong Kong, Shanghai.

== Fleet ==
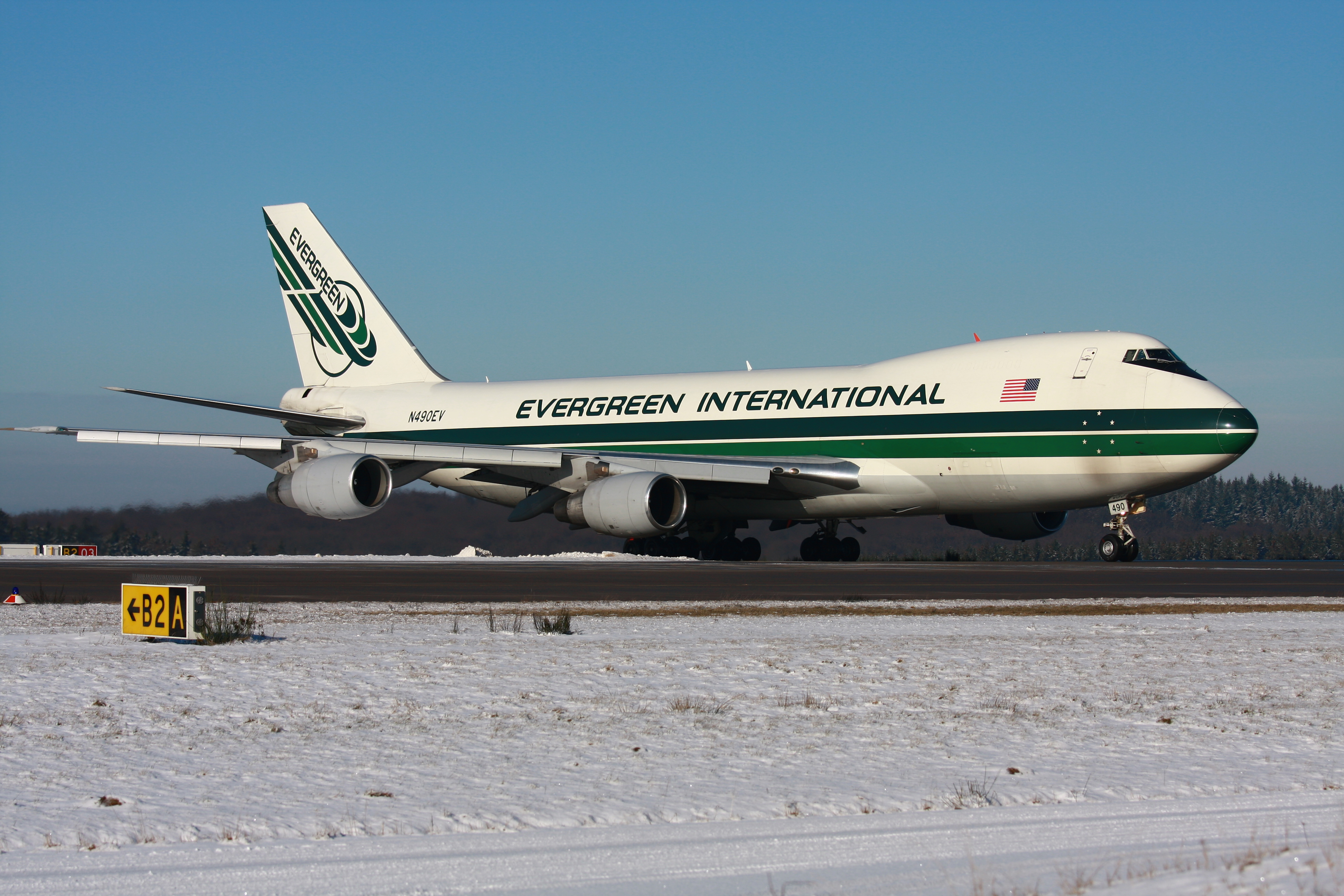
An Evergreen Boeing 747-200F taxiing at Frankfurt Hahn Airport, Germany. (2010)

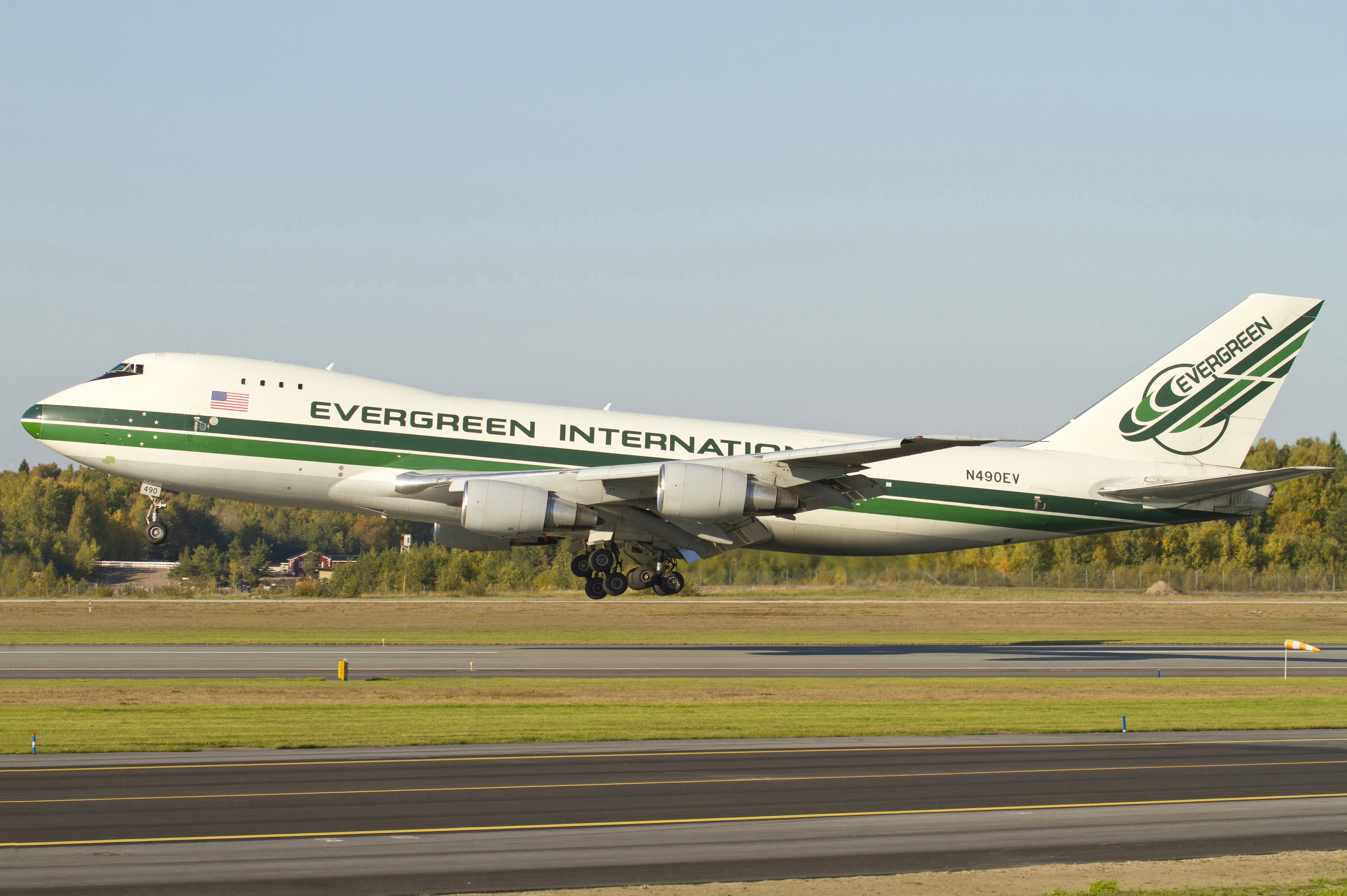
Boeing 747-230F landing at Stockholm - Arlanda

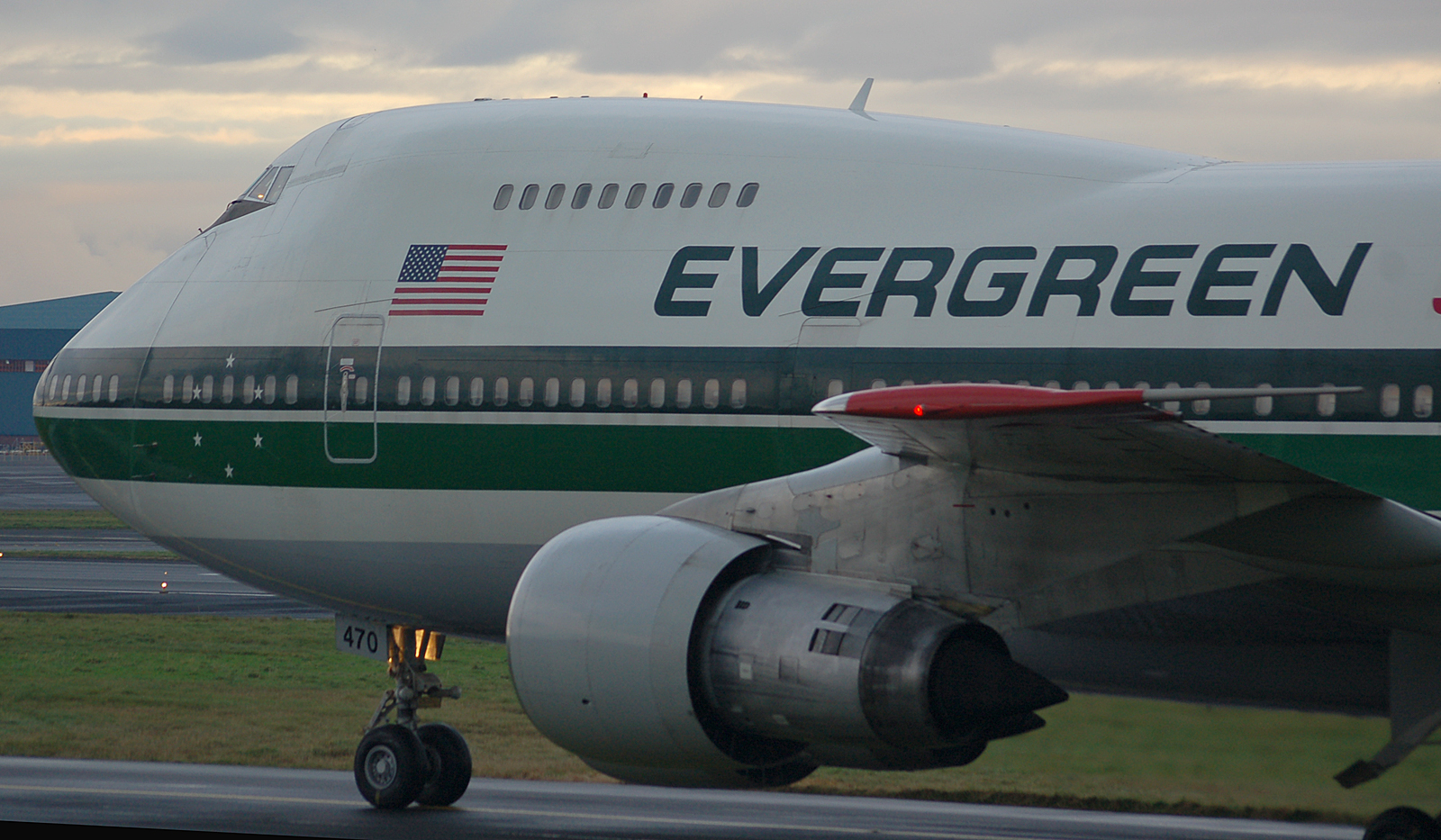
An Evergreen Boeing 747-200C. (2007)

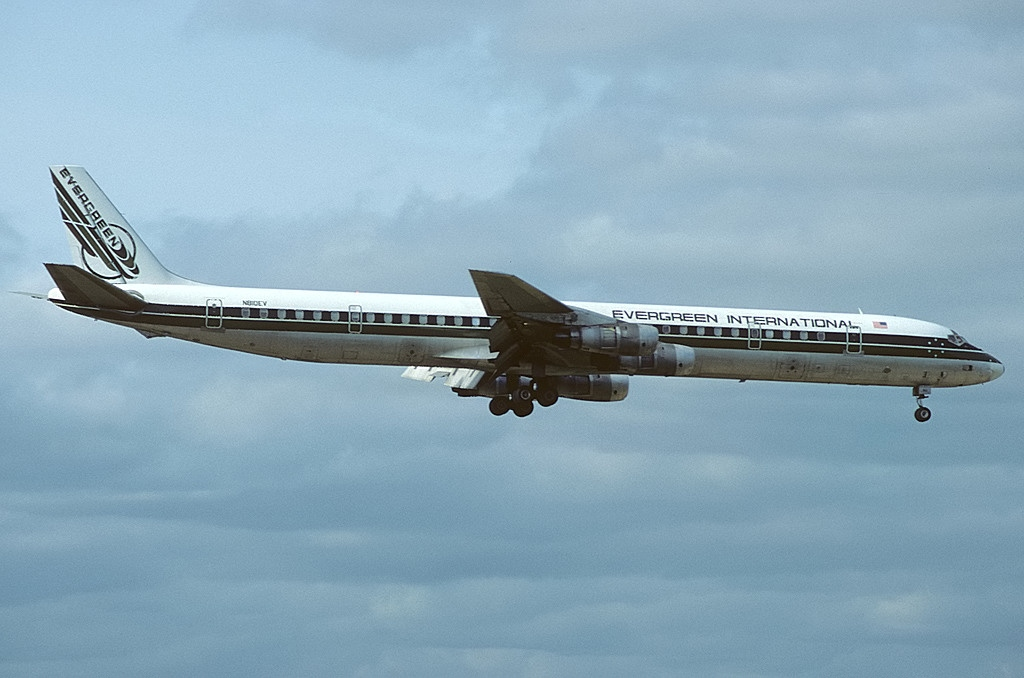
Evergreen International Douglas DC-8-61CF

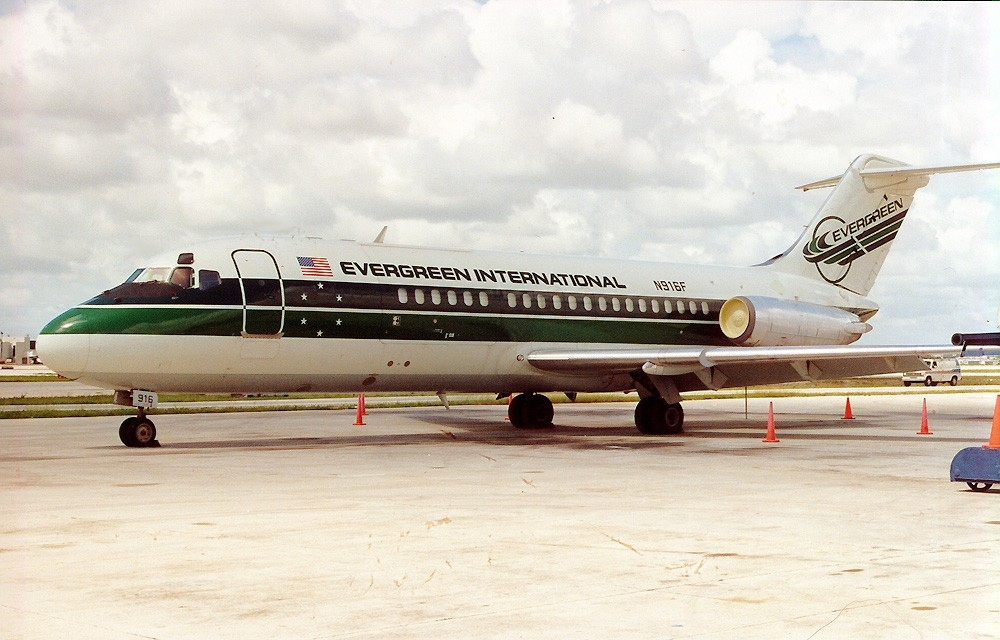
Evergreen International McDonnell Douglas DC-9-15(F)

The Evergreen International Airlines fleet consisted of the following aircraft:

Evergreen International Airlines fleet
| Aircraft | Total | Introduced | Retired | Notes |
|---|---|---|---|---|
| Airbus A300B4F | 3 | 2001 | 2005 | |
| Beechcraft 1900D | 2 | 2006 | 2013 | |
| Boeing 727-100F | 35 | 1979 | 1999 | |
| Boeing 747-100 | 3 | 1988 | 2013 | |
| Boeing 747-100SF | 11 | 1988 | 2011 | |
| Boeing 747-200C | 2 | 1994 | 2012 | Also used in charter service |
| Boeing 747-200F | 1 | 2007 | 2012 | |
| Boeing 747-200SF | 6 | 1995 | 2012 | |
| Boeing 747-400 | 1 | 2007 | 2010 | |
| Boeing 747-400BDSF | 1 | 2012 | 2013 | |
| Boeing 747-400BCF | 2 | 2012 | 2013 | |
| Boeing 747-400F | 1 | 2013 | 2013 | Operated for Saudia |
| Boeing 747-400LCF Dreamlifter | 3 | 2006 | 2010 | Operated for Boeing |
| Boeing 757-200 | 2 | 2006 | 2009 | |
| Convair CV-580 | 9 | 1975 | 1991 | |
| Curtiss C-46 Commando | 1 | 1975 | 1978 | |
| Dassault Falcon 20 | 4 | 1983 | 1987 | |
| Douglas C-47 Skytrain | 5 | 1977 | 1990 | |
| Douglas DC-8-33F | 2 | 1976 | 1979 | |
| Douglas DC-8-52 | 3 | 1977 | 1982 | |
| Douglas DC-8-61CF | 1 | 1982 | 1985 | |
| Douglas DC-8-62AF | 1 | 1988 | 1998 | |
| Douglas DC-8-63CF | 4 | 1979 | 1985 | |
| Douglas DC-8-73CF | 2 | 1988 | 1994 | |
| Fokker F27 Friendship | 1 | 1979 | 1979 | |
| Grumman Gulfstream II | 1 | 1988 | 1994 | |
| Learjet 35A | 1 | 1986 | 2013 | |
| Lockheed L-188A Electra | 9 | 1975 | 1990 | |
| Lockheed L-1011 TriStar | 1 | 1999 | 2001 | |
| North American Sabreliner | 1 | 1987 | 1989 | |
| McDonnell Douglas DC-9-15MC | 2 | 1988 | 2011 | |
| McDonnell Douglas DC-9-32CF | 5 | 1976 | 2000 | |
| McDonnell Douglas DC-9-33RC | 8 | 1987 | 2005 | |

Evergreen previously operated three Boeing Dreamlifters to transport the Boeing 787 parts to Boeing, but the contract was given to Atlas Air in September 2010. This was due to Boeing's rescheduled delivery of the Boeing 747-8Fs ordered by Atlas Air to increase their current fleet. The "Dreamlifter" is the logistic support aircraft for Boeing's global Boeing 787 Dreamliner production. The company was also scheduled to operate the SOFIA Boeing 747SP for NASA and the German Aerospace Center at NASA's Ames Research Center in Moffett Field, CA (in the silicon valley near San Jose).

The airline modified a Boeing 747-100 for aerial firefighting, receiving final certification from the FAA in October 2006. Compared to existing large water bombers and airtankers, the Evergreen Supertanker was planned to offer at least seven times more fire retardant capacity. In December 2010, Israel hired Evergreen's fire-fighting aircraft to assist in firefighting efforts of the 2010 Mount Carmel forest fire.

In August 2007, Evergreen announced that it had ordered three Boeing 747-400BCFs to upgrade its commercial operations, with deliveries in summer 2009. In March 2010, the orders had not yet been delivered. In December 2012, Evergreen ceased operations of the last three 747-200s; they are parked at Portsmouth International Airport at Pease.

A division of Evergreen, Evergreen Airspur, also operated de Havilland Canada DHC-6 Twin Otter STOL aircraft in scheduled commuter airline operations in southern California.

== Accidents and incidents ==
- March 18, 1989: Evergreen International Airlines Flight 17, a Douglas DC-9, was on a cargo flight from Kelly Air Force Base outside San Antonio, Texas to Tinker Air Force Base outside of Oklahoma City, Oklahoma with a stop at Carswell Air Force Base in Fort Worth, Texas. As the plane was departing, the cargo door on the plane opened; the pilot immediately requested emergency return to Carswell. As the plane was approaching on base leg, the cargo door fully opened, which caused the plane to yaw to the left and right, and then roll, until crashing near Saginaw in an inverted position. Both pilots on board were killed. The investigation found that when closing the cargo door, the copilot did not close it fully, but since the locked and latched indicators were applied incorrectly, the copilot thought the door was fully locked.
- December 12, 1991: An Evergreen Boeing 747-100 registered N475EV (Ex-N732PA of Pan Am, which was involved in a previous incident in December of 1969) was flying from New York to Tokyo with a stop in Anchorage. The plane was cruising at 31,000 feet and then suddenly banked 90 degrees to the right and descended at an angle of 30-35 degrees, falling over 10,000 feet before the pilots could regain control. The pilots stabilized the aircraft at 22,500 feet before landing safely in Duluth, Minnesota. Official reports indicate the aircraft reached Mach 0.98 (686 mph; 1,100 km/h) during its descent with some reports suggesting the plane broke the sound barrier, reaching speeds as high as Mach 1.25 (874.9 mph; 1,408 km/h).
- March 31, 1993: Lee waves were believed responsible for the in-flight separation of the #2 engine on an Evergreen Boeing 747-100 operating for Japan Airlines as Japan Air Lines Cargo Flight 46E, registered N473EV, near Anchorage, Alaska. The plane involved was used in the movie Die Hard 2. The plane was subsequently repaired, continuing in service until 2001.

== See also ==
- Johnson Flying Service
- Supplemental air carrier
- List of defunct airlines of the United States
