= Ponderosa State Park =

State park in Idaho, United States

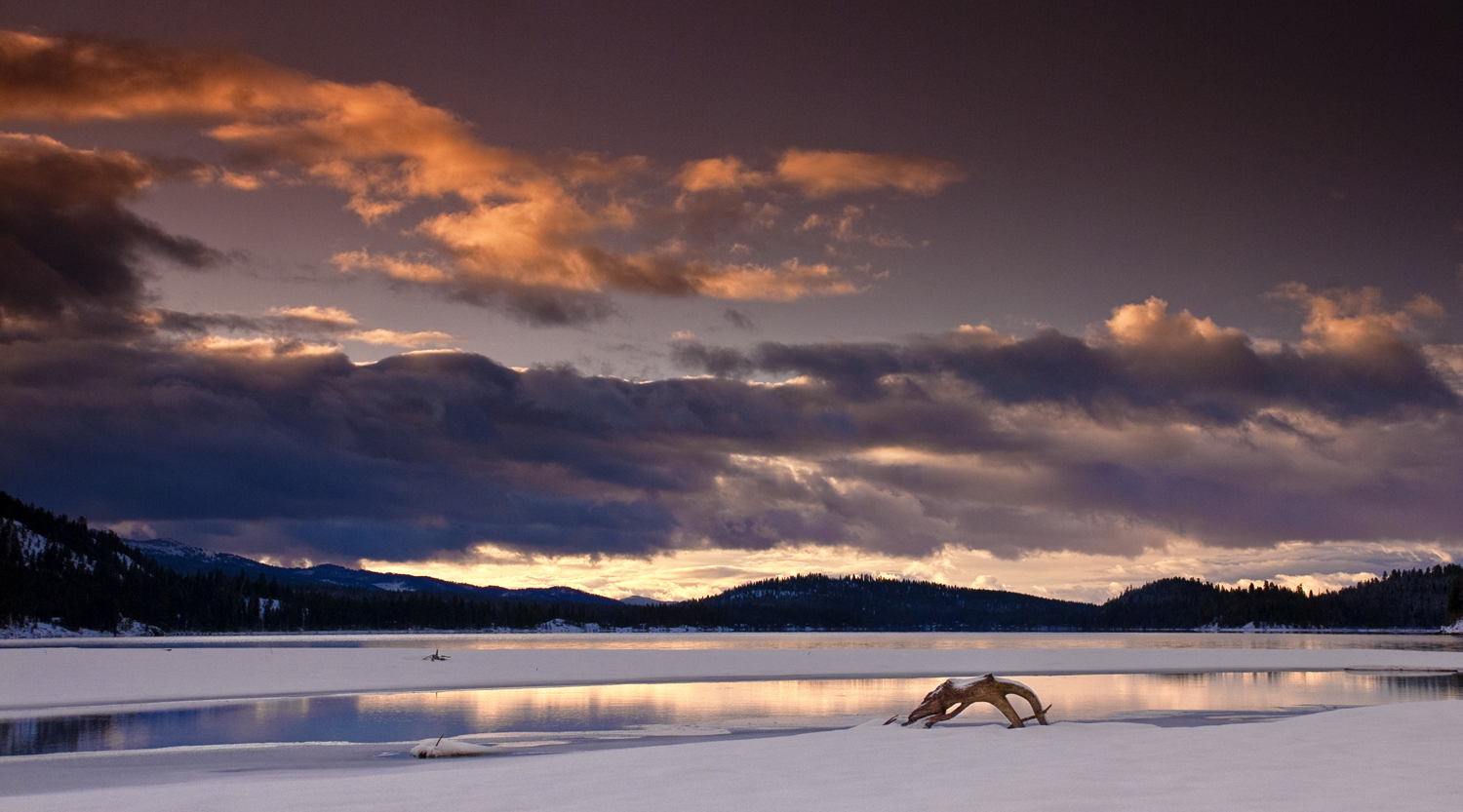
- Sunrise on the north shore of Payette Lake

- Location within Idaho Location within the United States
- Location: Valley County, Idaho, United States
- Nearest city: McCall, Idaho
- Coordinates: 44°55′40″N 116°04′56″W
- Area: 1,515 acres (613 ha)
- Elevation: 5,050 ft (1,540 m)
- Established: 1973
- Administrator: Idaho Department of Parks and Recreation
- Website: Official website

Ponderosa State Park is a public recreation area and state park occupying a peninsula in Payette Lake on the northeast edge of McCall in Valley County, Idaho, United States. The park's 1,515 acres (613 ha) include a second unit, called North Beach, located six miles (9.7 km) north of McCall at the northern extremity of the lake. The park has hiking and biking trails, guided walks, evening programs, beaches, picnic areas, and opportunities for skiing, snowshoeing, and wildlife watching. It is also home to the University of Idaho Field Campus.

== See also ==
- List of Idaho state parks
- National Parks in Idaho
