= McCall-Donnelly School District =

School district in Idaho, United States

Address
- 120 Idaho Street McCall, Idaho, 83638; United States

District information
- Type: Public
- Grades: PreK–12
- NCES District ID: 1602030

Students and staff
- Students: 1,270
- Teachers: 84.63
- Staff: 62.13
- Student–teacher ratio: 15.01

McCall-Donnelly Joint School District is a school district headquartered in McCall, Idaho. As of 2020 its enrollment count is about 1,300. Its territory includes sections of Valley and Adams counties, with 98% of its territory in the former and the remainder in the latter.

== History ==
It was established in 1950.

Glen Szymoniak served as superintendent until his December 19, 2014 resignation. Jim Foudy, previously principal of Barbara R. Morgan Elementary School, became interim superintendent immediately and was formally named superintendent in April 2015.

== Schools ==
Secondary

- McCall-Donnelly High School (McCall) - grades 9-12
- Payette Lakes Middle School (McCall) - grades 6-8

Elementary (Preschool-Grade 50

- Barbara R. Morgan Elementary School (McCall)
- Donnelly Elementary School (Donnelly)

Alternative

- Heartland High School (for secondary grades)
