= Payette Lake =

Alpine lake in the state of Idaho

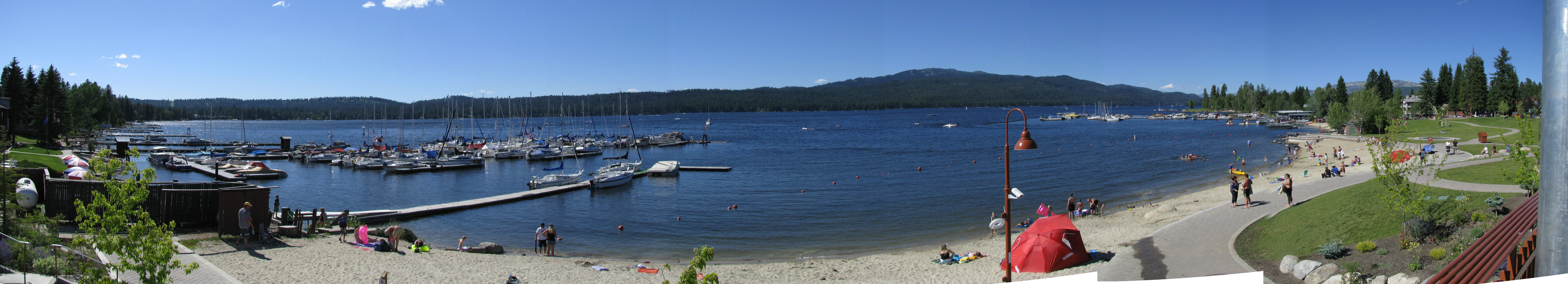
- Panoramic view of southern shore in McCall

- Location in the United States Location in Idaho
- Location: Valley County, Idaho, U.S.
- Coordinates: 44.95°N 116.09°W
- Primary inflows: North Fork Payette River
- Primary outflows: North Fork Payette River
- Catchment area: 144 square miles (373 km^{2})
- Basin countries: United States
- Max. length: 6 miles (9.7 km)
- Max. width: 2.25 miles (3.62 km)
- Surface area: 4,986.7 acres (2,018.0 ha)
- Average depth: 121 feet (36.8 m)
- Max. depth: 304 feet (92.7 m)
- Water volume: 0.18 cubic miles (0.75 km^{3})
- Shore length^{1}: 22 miles (36 km)
- Surface elevation: 4,990 feet (1,520 m)
- Settlements: McCall, Idaho
- ^{1} Shore length is not a well-defined measure.

Payette Lake is a 5,000 acre natural lake in the western United States, located in west central Idaho at McCall. Formed by glacial activity, it is situated in the upper drainage basin of the Payette River, which drains into the Snake River.

Outflow from the lake at its southwest corner is regulated for irrigation purposes by a small dam completed in 1943. The normal maximum lake surface elevation of 4,990 feet (1,520 m) above sea level is attained in July; a normal drawdown of 5 feet 7 inches (1.7 m) is completed by December.

The lake's surface area and volume, excluding islands, are 7.9 square miles (20.5 km^{2}) and 0.18 cubic miles (0.75 km^{3}), respectively; mean and maximum depths are 121 feet (36.8 m) and 304 feet (92.7 m), respectively; and shoreline length is about 22 miles (36 km). The maximum length of the lake is 6.02 miles (9.7 km) and the maximum width is 2.25 miles (3.62 km).

The principal tributary and outlet is the North Fork of the Payette River. The lake receives drainage from 144 square miles (373 km^{2}) of heavily forested, mountainous terrain. Further south, the North Fork flows into Lake Cascade, the reservoir behind Cascade Dam.

== History ==
Prior to the arrival of Euro-American hunters in the 1830s, the area had been inhabited by Native Americans for thousands of years. The discovery of gold in 1862 in the upper drainage of Payette Lake prompted an influx of miners to the area. The townsite of McCall was established on the lake's southern shore in the 1880s. The area became more accessible in 1914 when a railroad and roads were extended to McCall, which was becoming a tourist destination for summer and winter recreation. In 1920, the Idaho State Land Board began leasing vacation homesites around Payette Lake. Increasing recreational demands led to the establishment of Brundage Mountain Ski Area and Ponderosa State Park, both near McCall, in the 1960s.

The large Payette Lakes Club was said to be significant in supporting recreation in the area; it was built 1914–15, on a knoll overlooking the lake from the west, and served as an inn, casino, and Chautauqua center. It was surrounded by development of many small cabin lots.

== Activities ==
The Lake is a popular fishing destination for fly fishing, shore fishing, and boat fishing. There are three species of trout in the lake: rainbow, cutthroat and lake trout. Additional species include Kokanee, tiger muskie, walleye, crappie, and smallmouth bass. Trophy-sized fish are frequently caught here.

In addition to fishing, lake activities include swimming, sailing, water skiing, wake surfing, wake boarding, jet skiing, canoeing, kayaking, and paddle boarding. There are several public launch sites around the lake and marina slips, as well as options for renting equipment on the lake and in the town of McCall. There is a fuel dock at the Mile High Marina.

== In popular culture ==
In Idaho folklore, a sea serpent much like the Loch Ness Monster is said to live in the deep waters of Payette Lake and in 1954, the creature was given the name Sharlie.

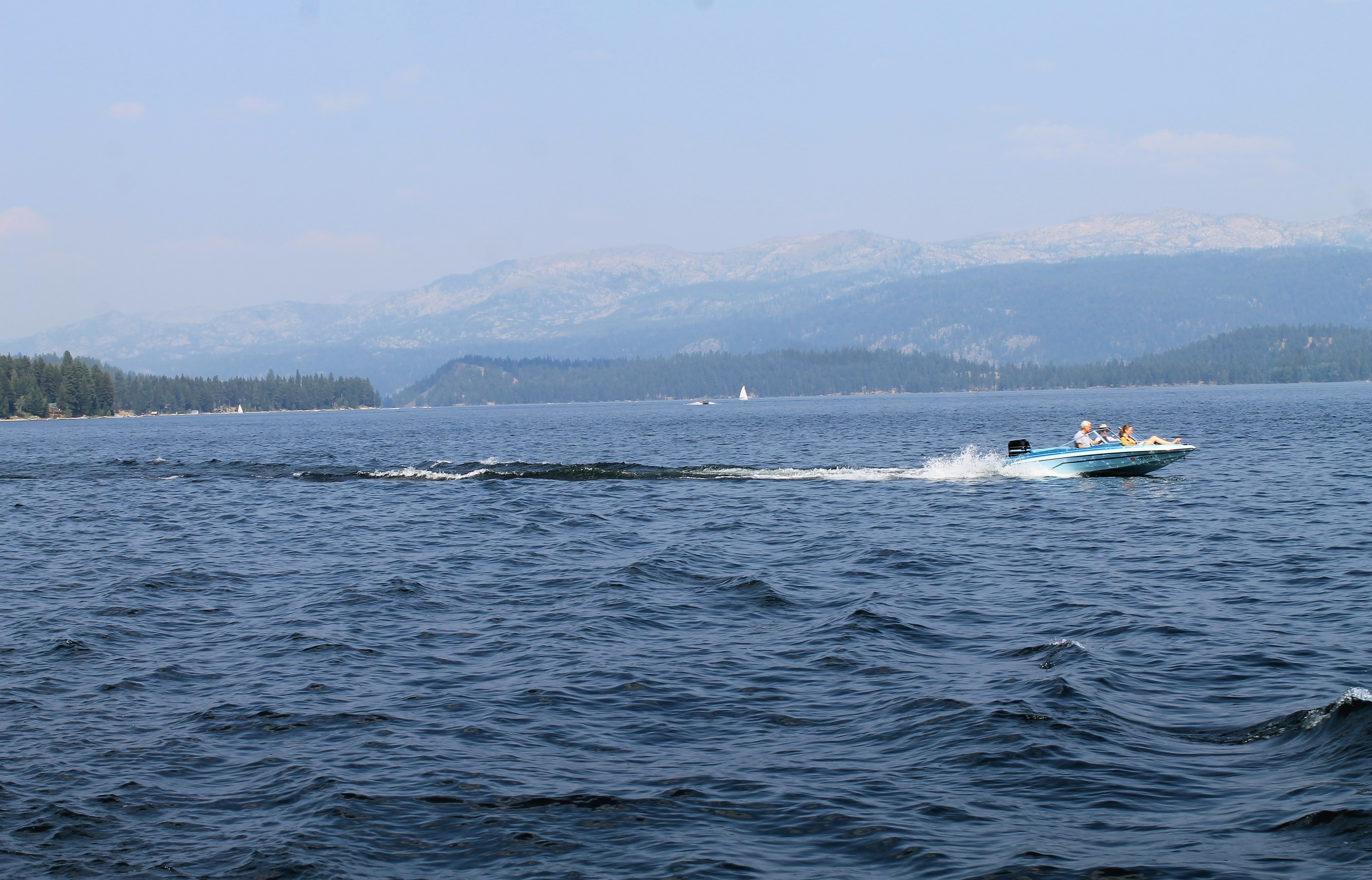
Payette Lake, 2018
