= Missoula Montana Airport =

Missoula Montana Airport Johnson-Bell Field

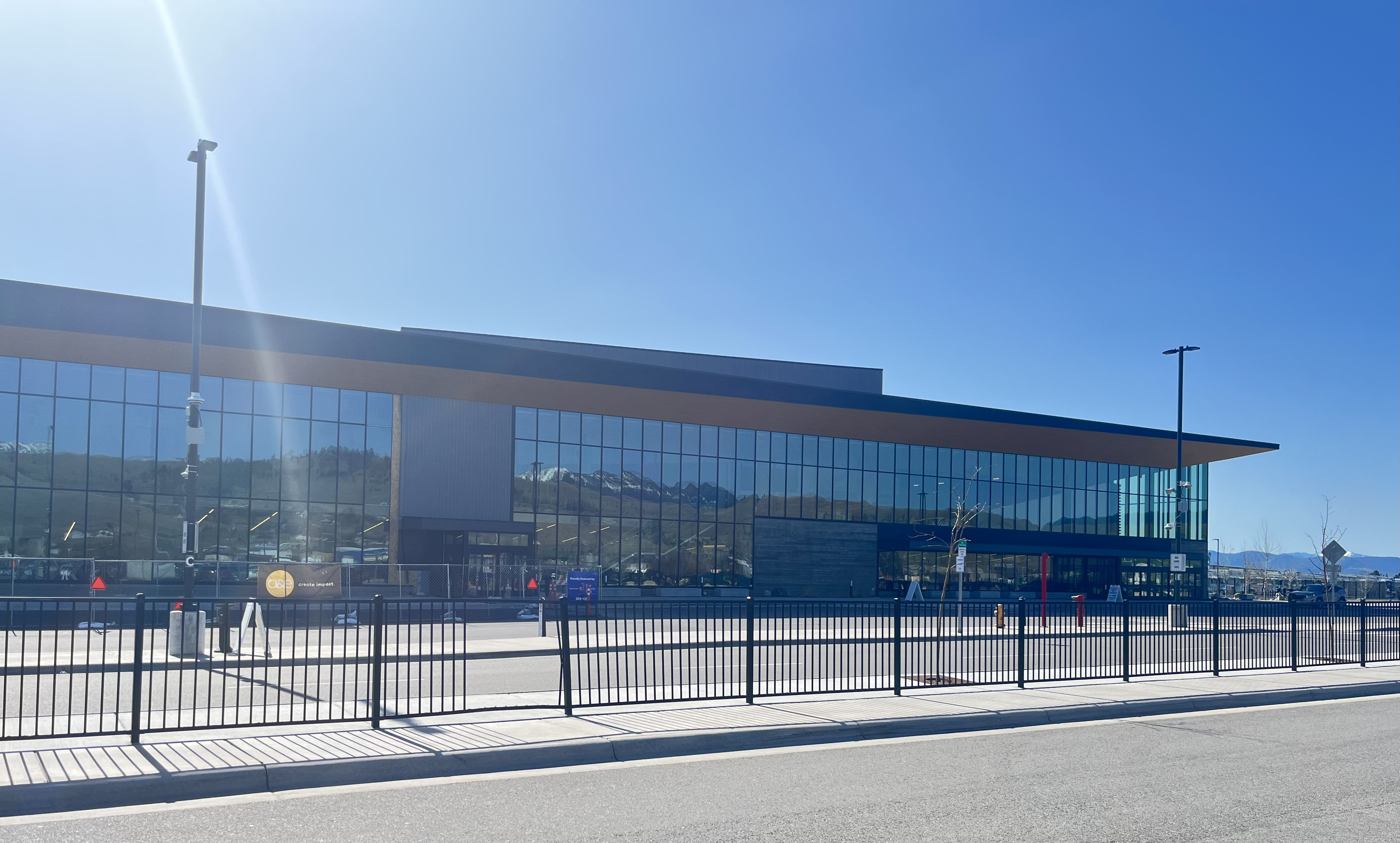
- IATA: MSO; ICAO: KMSO; FAA LID: MSO

Summary
- Airport type: Public
- Owner: Missoula County Airport Authority
- Serves: Missoula, Montana
- Elevation AMSL: 3,206 ft (977 m)
- Coordinates: 46°54′59″N 114°05′26″W
- Website: FlyMissoula.com

Map
- Interactive map of Missoula Montana Airport

Runways
Direction	Length		Surface
Direction	ft	m	Surface
12/30	9,501	2,896	Asphalt
08/26	4,612	1,406	Asphalt

Statistics (2025)
- Enplanements: 523,857
- Deplanements: 520,923
- Passengers: 1,044,780
- Sources: Montana DOT

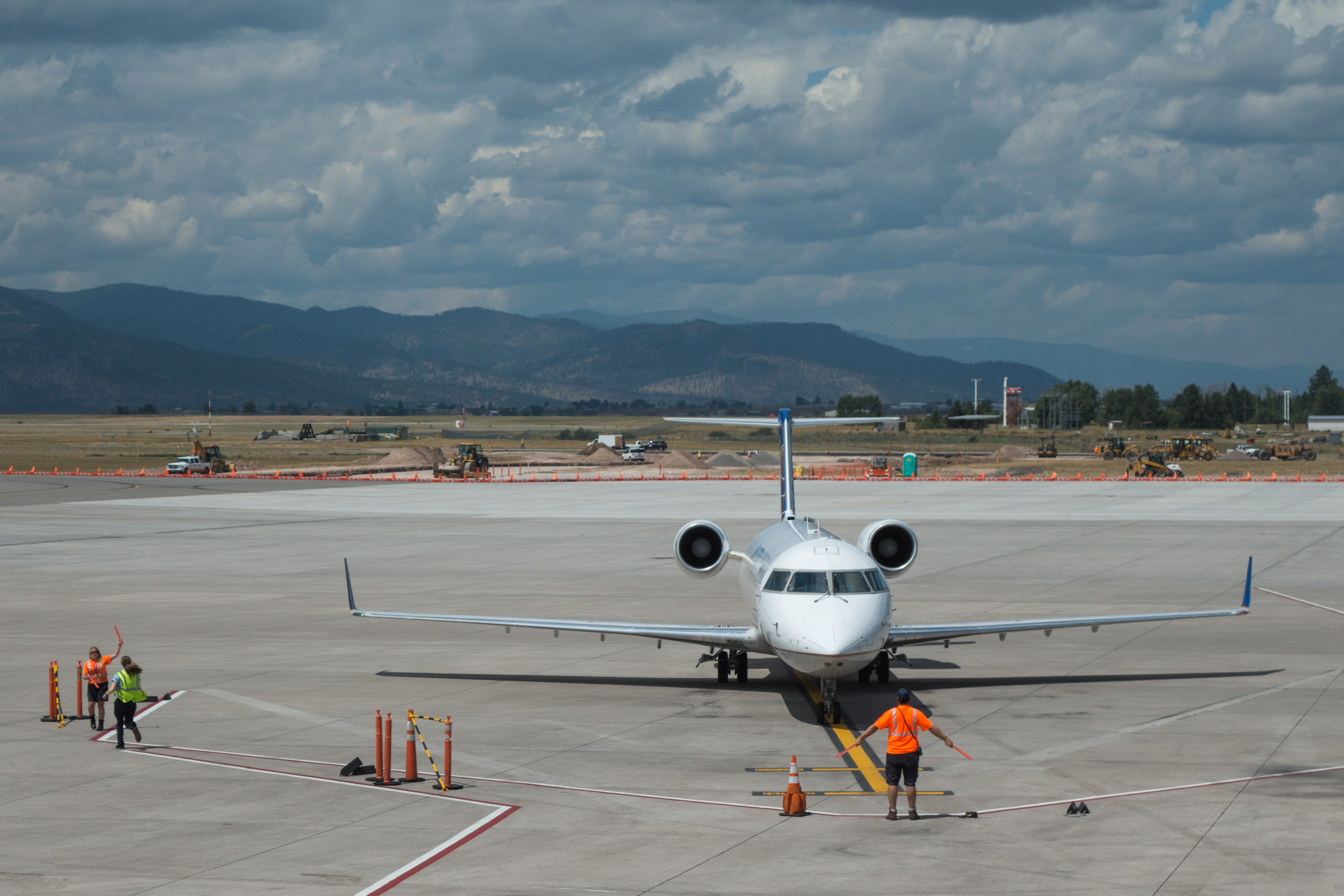
A United Express CRJ200 arriving from San Francisco

Missoula Montana Airport (IATA: MSO, ICAO: KMSO, FAA LID: MSO) is located in Missoula, in Missoula County, Montana. It is owned by the Missoula County Airport Authority.

The National Plan of Integrated Airport Systems for 2011–2015 categorized it as a primary commercial service airport (more than 10,000 enplanements per year). Federal Aviation Administration records say the airport had 288,071 passenger boardings (enplanements) in calendar year 2008, 281,428 in 2009 and 289,875 in 2010.

Several expansion projects have been completed in recent years. A 101-foot control tower was completed in September 2012. An expansion of the old terminal building, with a new security screening area, was completed in 2007. In 2022, construction finished on the new terminal.

In September 2021, the airport changed its name from Missoula International Airport to Missoula Montana Airport.

Missoula's airport is home to a U.S. Forest Service smokejumper base, the largest of seven in the nation.

== History ==
Missoula's first landing strip was laid out in 1923 south of the university. An additional strip near the Western Montana Fair Grounds on what is now Sentinel High School was sold to the county in 1927 at the request of the Missoula chapter of the National Aeronautic Association and would become Missoula's first true airport. The current airfield is named after that chapter's first president, Harry O. Bell, along with mountain flying pioneer Bob Johnson of Johnson Flying Service (now Minuteman Aviation).

The original Garden City Airport was renamed Hale Field in 1935, and operated as such until closing forever in 1954.

The airport was gradually replaced by the Missoula County Airport, opened in 1941 with WPA funds, and the cooperation of the US Forest Service, which needed access to an airport. The new airport was renamed Johnson-Bell Field in 1968 and today serves over 1 million passengers a year.

== Facilities ==
The airport covers 2,700 acres (1,093 ha) at an elevation of 3,206 feet (977 m). It has two asphalt runways: 12/30 is 9,501 by 150 feet (2,896 x 46 m) and 8/26 is 4,612 by 75 feet (1,406 x 23 m).

The airport constructed a new 101-foot tall control tower, replacing one that opened in 1961. The new control tower is one of the tallest control towers in the Pacific Northwest, and is the tallest in Montana. It cost an estimated $6.77 million.

Due to increased patronage, it was determined in 2013 that further expansion of the current terminal was not financially prudent, with a new terminal instead being proposed. Construction started on Phase 1 of the new terminal, the South Concourse, in 2018, and finished in 2022. Demolition of the old terminal was completed in 2023. In 2024, Senator Jon Tester announced that a $6 million in funding was secured to begin construction of the eastward terminal expansion, funded by a FAA Airport Terminal Program grant included in the Infrastructure Investment and Jobs Act that was signed into law by President Joe Biden. The expansion plan includes four new gates, an expanded baggage claim area and a new rental car center.

In August 2024, the airport became one of the few in the country to allow non-ticketed persons to visit areas past security.

== Airlines and destinations ==
=== Passenger ===
Airlines	Destinations
Alaska Airlines	Portland, Seattle/Tacoma; Seasonal: San Diego
Allegiant Air	Las Vegas, Phoenix/Mesa; Seasonal: Orange County
American Airlines	Dallas/Fort Worth
American Eagle	Dallas/Fort Worth, Chicago–O'Hare; Seasonal: Los Angeles
Delta Air Lines	Salt Lake City, Minneapolis/St. Paul
Delta Connection	Salt Lake City
United Airlines	Denver; Seasonal: Chicago–O'Hare
United Express	Denver; Seasonal: San Francisco

Neptune Aviation, an aerial firefighting company, is based at the airport.

Destinations map
Destinations from Missoula Montana Airport
Red = Year-round destination
Green = Seasonal destination
Blue = Future destination

== Statistics ==
=== Top destinations ===
Top ten busiest domestic routes out of MSO (August 2024 – July 2025)
Rank	City	Passengers	Carriers
1	Denver, Colorado	138,030	Frontier, United
2	Seattle/Tacoma, Washington	100,040	Alaska
3	Salt Lake City, Utah	78,200	Delta
4	Minneapolis/St. Paul, Minnesota	59,570	Delta
5	Dallas/Fort Worth, Texas	48,190	American
6	Chicago–O'Hare, Illinois	26,720	American, United
7	Portland, Oregon	23,440	Alaska
8	Phoenix/Mesa, Arizona	23,280	Allegiant
9	Las Vegas, Nevada	13,530	Allegiant
10	San Francisco, California	5,490	United

== See also ==
- List of airports in Montana
