= McCall Municipal Airport =

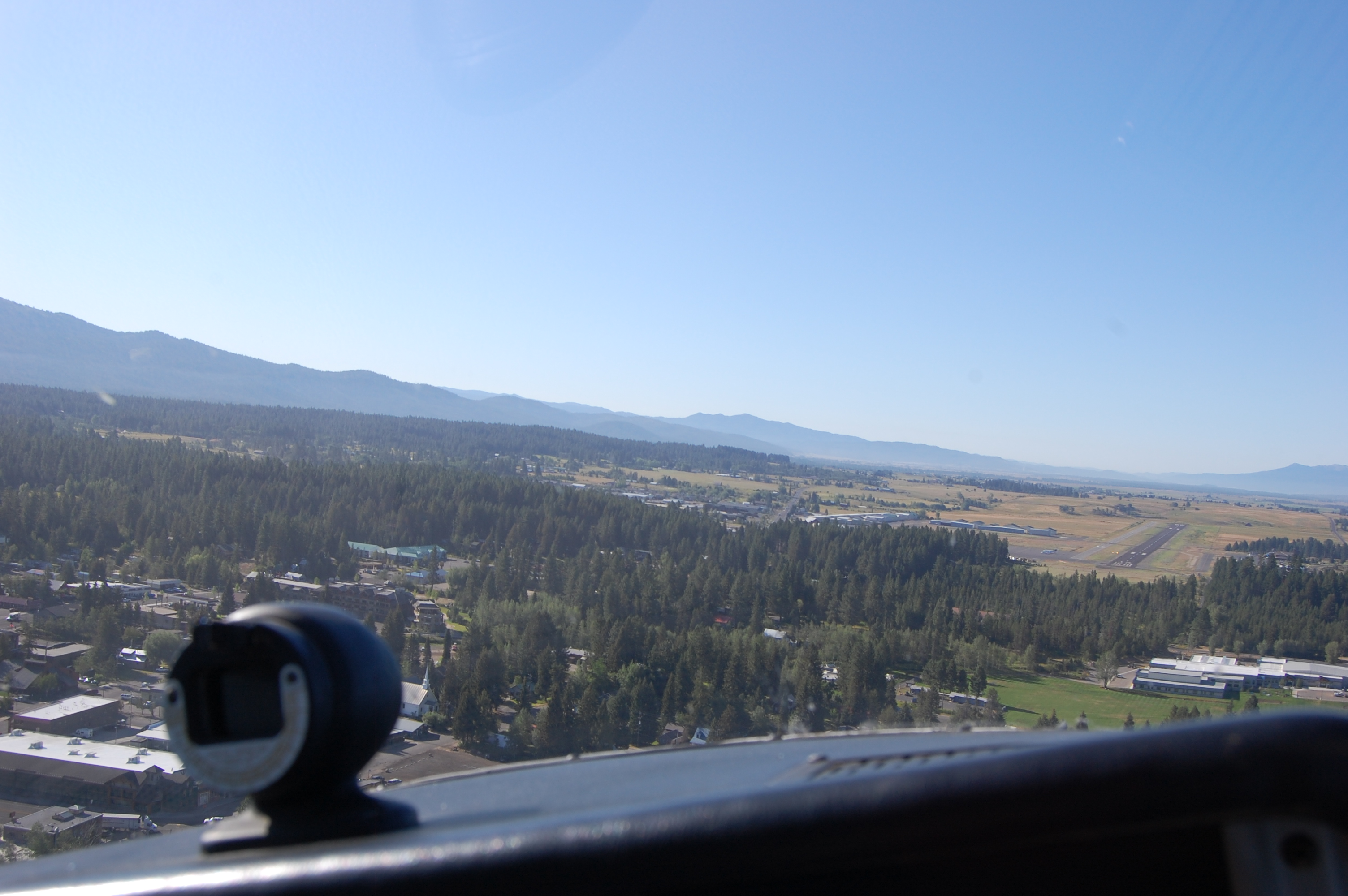
- Final approach to runway 16 in 2011
- IATA: MYL; ICAO: KMYL; FAA LID: MYL

Summary
- Airport type: Public
- Owner: City of McCall
- Serves: McCall, Idaho
- Elevation AMSL: 5,024 ft / 1,531 m
- Coordinates: 44°53′19″N 116°06′06″W
- Website: McCall Airport

Map
- Location in the United States Location in Idaho

Runways
Direction	Length		Surface
Direction	ft	m	Surface
16/34	6,108	1,862	Asphalt

Statistics (2015)
- Aircraft operations: 43,600
- Based aircraft: 97
- Source: Federal Aviation Administration

McCall Municipal Airport (IATA: MYL, ICAO: KMYL, FAA LID: MYL) is a city-owned public-use airport in the western United States, located in McCall, Idaho. It is included in the FAA's National Plan of Integrated Airport Systems for 2011–2015, which categorized it as a general aviation facility.

McCall is home to a U.S. Forest Service smokejumper base, one of seven in the nation.

The airport was the site of a fatal crash in 2008 on May 2, when two single-engine planes collided on final approach to runway 34 and exploded, resulting in three deaths.

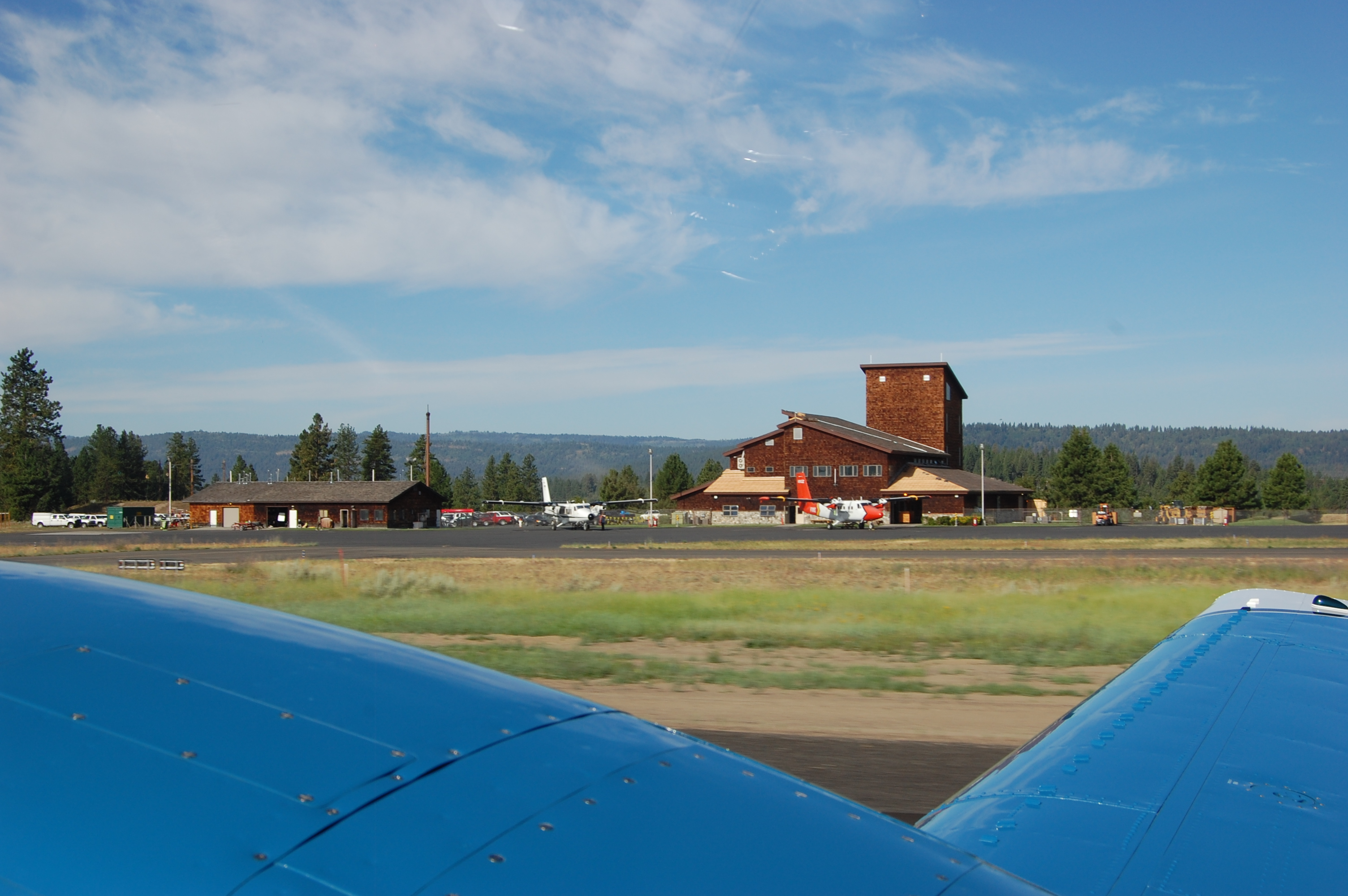
The USFS smokejumper firefighting base at McCall

== Facilities and aircraft ==
McCall Municipal Airport covers an area of 197 acres (0.80 km^{2}) at an elevation of 5,024 feet (1,531 m) above sea level. It has one runway, aligned north–south and designated 16/34, with an asphalt surface measuring 6,108 by 75 feet (1,862 by 23 m). The north end of the runway is about a mile (1.6 km) south of Payette Lake.

For the 12-month period ending August 13, 2010, the airport had 43,600 aircraft operations, an average of 119 per day: 84% general aviation, 16% air taxi, and <1% military. At that time, there were 94 aircraft based at this airport: 82% single-engine, 14% multi-engine, 3% jet, and 1% helicopter.

There is an RNAV approach for both Runway 16 and 34.

== Airlines and destinations ==
Airlines	Destinations
Gem Air	Boise

== See also ==
- List of airports in Idaho
