= McCall, Idaho =

- City
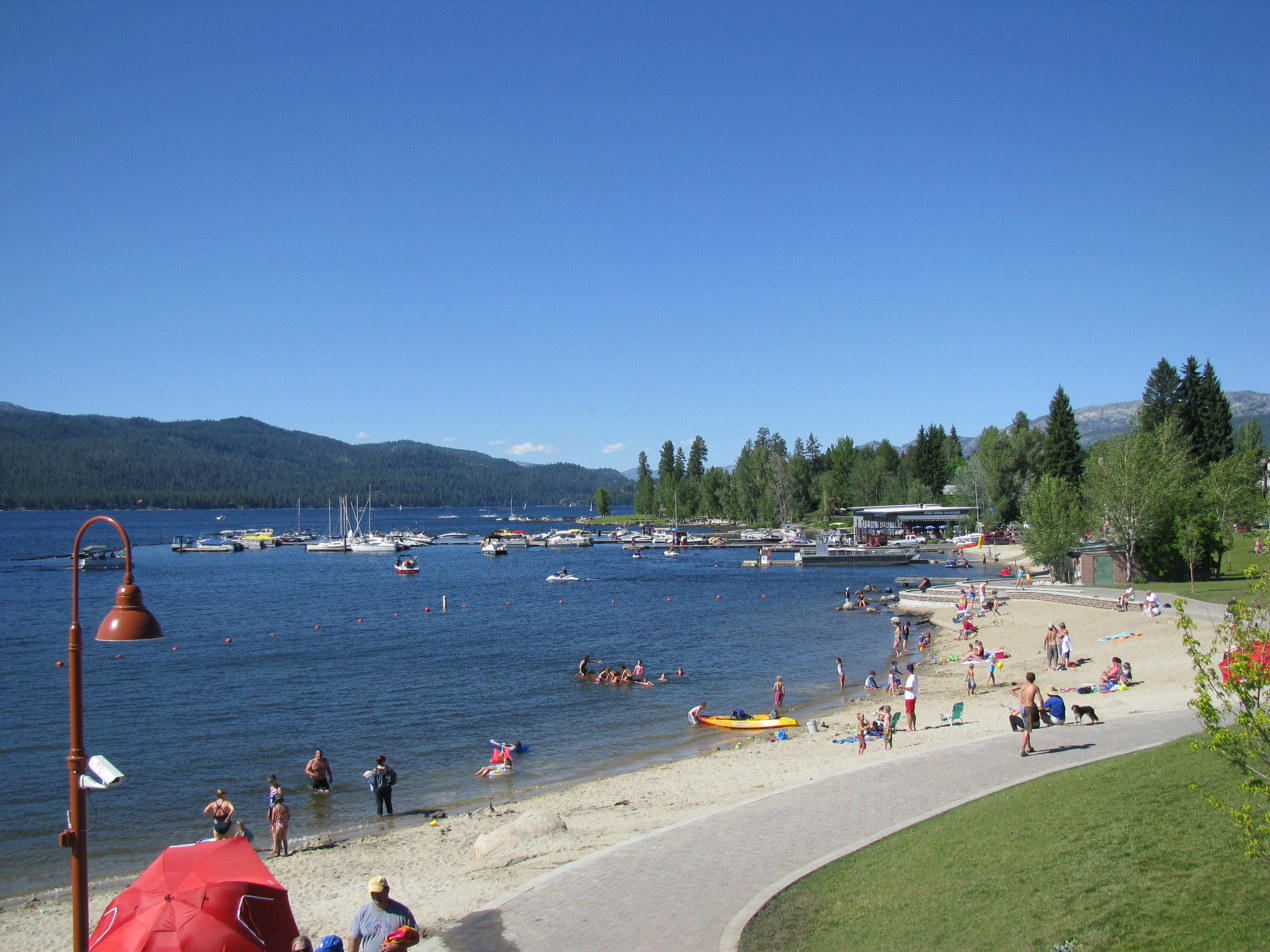
- Payette Lake at McCall in July 2010

- Location of McCall in Valley County, Idaho.

- Location in the United States
- Coordinates: 44°54′39″N 116°07′15″W
- Country: United States
- State: Idaho
- County: Valley
- Settled: 1889
- Incorporated: 19 July 1911 (town)

Government
  - Type: council-manager

Area
  - Total: 9.92 sq mi (25.7 km^{2})
  - Land: 9.06 sq mi (23.5 km^{2})
  - Water: 0.86 sq mi (2.2 km^{2})
- Elevation: 5,030 ft (1,530 m)

Population (2020)
  - Total: 3,686
  - Density: 396.98/sq mi (153.27/km^{2})
- Time zone: UTC-7 (Mountain Time Zone)
  - Summer (DST): UTC-6 (Mountain Daylight Time)
- ZIP codes: 83635, 83638
- Area codes: 208, 986
- FIPS code: 16-48790
- GNIS feature ID: 2411058
- Website: www.mccall.id.us

McCall is a resort town on the western edge of Valley County, Idaho, United States. Named after its founder, Tom McCall, it is situated on the southern shore of Payette Lake, near the center of the Payette National Forest. The population was 3,686 as of the 2020 census, up from 2,991 in 2010.

== History ==
Native Americans were the first inhabitants of the McCall area. Three tribes, the Tukudika (a sub-band of the Shoshone known as the "Sheepeaters"), the Shoshone, and the Nez Perce, inhabited the land primarily in the summer and migrated during the harsh winter months.

In the early 19th century, mountain men including the nomadic French Canadian fur trapper François Payette, Jim Bridger, Peter Skene Ogden, and Jedediah Smith passed through the area.

During the 1860s, miners temporarily named the settlement "Lake City", but only alluvial gold was discovered, so the temporary establishment was abandoned as most mining activity moved north to the town of Warren.

The settlement of McCall was established by Thomas and Louisa McCall in 1889. For a cabin and assumed rights to the 160 acres (0.65 km^{2}) of land, they traded a team of horses with Sam Dever, who held the squatter rights. Tom, his wife, four sons and a daughter lived in the cabin located on the shore of the lake, near present-day Hotel McCall. He established a school, hotel, saloon, and post office, and named himself postmaster. McCall purchased a sawmill from the Warren Dredging company and later sold it to the Hoff & Brown Lumber Company, which would become a major employer until its closure in 1977.

During this time Anneas "Jews Harp Jack" Wyatte provided the first recreational sailboat rides around the lake for tourists and advertised in Boise's Idaho Statesman a "30-foot sailing yacht for the use of parties who might visit the lake". The Statesman referred to McCall as a "pleasure resort."

Tourism continued in the early 20th century. In June 1902, the Boydstun Hotel in nearby Lardo opened as a "place to stay and camp on Payette Lake". In 1906, Charlie Nelson opened a tented camping area known as Sylvan Beach Resort along the west side of Payette Lake. In 1907, Lardo Inn opened for business. The arrival of the Oregon Short Line Railroad (a subsidiary of the Union Pacific Railroad) in 1914 secured McCall as a viable community and tourist destination. The Town of McCall was officially incorporated on 19 July 1911.

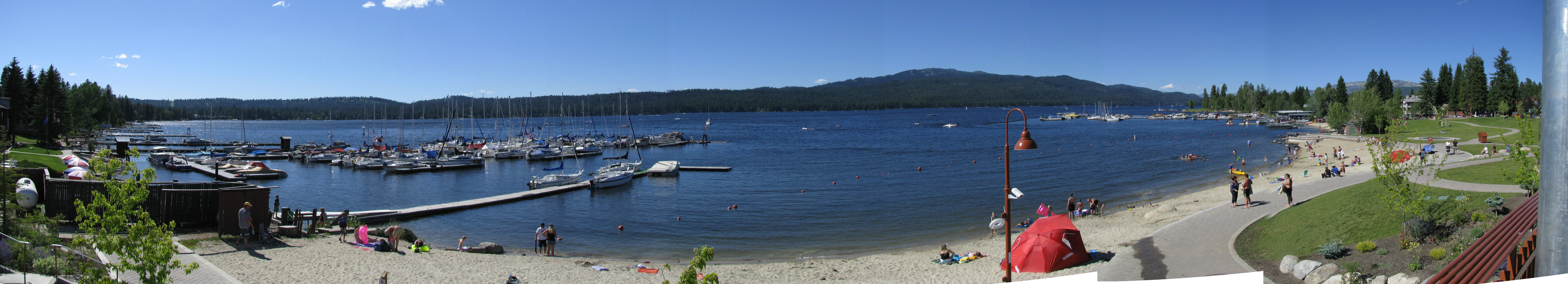
Panorama of Payette Lake

The town's annual winter carnival was inspired by the Payette Lake Sports Carnival initially held in 1923–24 and lasting several years. Activities included dog and snowshoe races, ski jumping, horse skijoring, and a tug-o-war. Reports vary between hundreds to thousands of tourists visiting the festivities. The Winter Carnival, which resumed in1941, recently celebrated100 years.

The beauty of McCall and Payette Lake drew attention from Hollywood in 1938 when it was selected as the filming location for the Academy Award-nominated Northwest Passage, starring Spencer Tracy, Robert Young, and Walter Brennan. The film, released in 1940, was set during the French and Indian War of 1755–63 in eastern North America, Idaho's forests substituting for the woods of New England and the Upper Midwest.

In 1943, the U.S. Forest Service opened the McCall smokejumper base, one of nine permanent smokejumper bases in the nation. The site includes a smokejumper training unit, parachute loft, dispatch office, and the McCall air tanker base at the airport.

After World War II, a consortium of businessmen and doctors from Lewiston, 150 miles (240 km) to the north, decided that McCall and the lake were an ideal recreation site and thus the town was transformed from lumber to tourism. The iconic Shore Lodge opened on 3 July 1948, at Shellworth Beach on Payette Lake. The lodge became McCall's centerpiece for the next 51 years. Shore Lodge management and shareholders intentionally created a resort-style lodge that was a cozy and intimate place for locals and tourists, contrasting with the glamour and glitz of the other famous Idaho lodge in Sun Valley. It was turned into a private club in 1999, then it re-opened to the public in 2008. One of Shore Lodge's first summer employees was University of Idaho student John Ascuaga of Notus, who worked as a bellhop learning the business from the bottom up and was to go on to found the Nugget hotel, convention center, and casino in Sparks, Nevada, one of the largest and most successful in the Reno, Nevada area.

In 1965, a 1,000 acres (4.0 km^{2}) peninsula 2 miles (3 km) outside of McCall became Ponderosa State Park, home to large old-growth trees.

== Geography ==
The town is situated on the southern shore of Payette Lake, near the center of the Payette National Forest. According to the United States Census Bureau, the city has a total area of 9.924 square miles (25.70 km^{2}), of which, 9.061 square miles (23.47 km^{2}) is land and 0.863 square miles (2.24 km^{2}) is water.

== Demographics ==
Historical population
Census	Pop.	Note	%±
1920	307		—
1930	651		112.1%
1940	875		34.4%
1950	1,173		34.1%
1960	1,423		21.3%
1970	1,758		23.5%
1980	2,188		24.5%
1990	2,005		−8.4%
2000	2,084		3.9%
2010	2,991		43.5%
2020	3,686		23.2%
US Decennial Census

=== 2020 census ===
As of the 2020 census, McCall had a population of 3,686. The median age was 45.0 years. 19.6% of residents were under the age of 18 and 24.3% were 65 years of age or older. For every 100 females, there were 98.9 males, and for every 100 females age 18 and over, there were 98.3 males age 18 and over.

91.8% of residents lived in urban areas, while 8.2% lived in rural areas.

There were 1,630 households in McCall, of which 23.9% had children under the age of 18 living in them. Of all households, 48.2% were married-couple households, 20.1% were households with a male householder and no spouse or partner present, and 24.8% were households with a female householder and no spouse or partner present. About 31.9% of all households were made up of individuals and 13.2% had someone living alone who was 65 years of age or older. In addition, 40.1% of residents aged 15 and older had never been married, and the average family size was 2.92.

There were 3,707 housing units, of which 1,630 were occupied and 2,077 were vacant. The vacancy rate was 56.0%; the homeowner vacancy rate was 2.0% and the rental vacancy rate was 9.9%. The homeownership rate was 78.6%.

Racial composition as of the 2020 census
Race	Number	Percent
White	3,250	88.2%
Black or African American	8	0.2%
American Indian and Alaska Native	27	0.7%
Asian	34	0.9%
Native Hawaiian and Other Pacific Islander	0	0.0%
Some other race	189	5.1%
Two or more races	178	4.8%
Hispanic or Latino (of any race)	297	8.1%

=== 2010 census ===
As of the 2010 United States census, there were 2,991 people, 1,348 households, and 769 families in the city. The population density was 324.1 inhabitants per square mile (125.1/km^{2}). There were 3,581 housing units at an average density of 388.0 per square mile (149.8/km^{2}). The racial makeup of the city was 93.6% White, 0.1% African American, 0.7% Native American, 0.5% Asian, 3.6% from other races, and 1.4% from two or more races. Hispanic or Latino of any race were 6.9% of the population.

There were 1,348 households, of which 25.1% had children under the age of 18 living with them, 45.3% were married couples living together, 7.2% had a female householder with no husband present, 4.5% had a male householder with no wife present, and 43.0% were non-families. 33.5% of all households were made up of individuals, and 8.2% had someone living alone who was 65 years of age or older. The average household size was 2.19 and the average family size was 2.80.

The median age in the city was 40.7 years. 21% of residents were under the age of 18; 6.9% were between the ages of 18 and 24; 27.5% were from 25 to 44; 31.1% were from 45 to 64; and 13.5% were 65 years of age or older. The gender makeup of the city was 51.7% male and 48.3% female.

=== 2000 census ===
As of the 2000 United States census, there were 2,084 people, 902 households, and 549 families in the town. The population density was 352.4 inhabitants per square mile (136.1/km^{2}). There were 2,247 housing units at an average density of 379.9 per square mile (146.7/km^{2}). The racial makeup of the town was 96.83% White, 0.05% African American, 0.48% Native American, 0.14% Asian, 1.34% from other races, and 1.15% from two or more races. 2.59% of the population were Hispanic or Latino of any race. 19.2% were of German, 17.3% English, 10.6% Irish and 8.2% American ancestry according to Census 2000. 98.3% spoke English and 1.7% Spanish as their first language.

There were 902 households, out of which 28.8% had children under the age of 18 living with them, 49.2% were married couples living together, 7.9% had a female householder with no husband present, and 39.1% were non-families. 33.3% of all households were made up of individuals, and 11.1% had someone living alone who was 65 years of age or older. The average household size was 2.25 and the average family size was 2.86.

The town population contained 24.3% under the age of 18, 6.0% from 18 to 24, 24.6% from 25 to 44, 30.7% from 45 to 64, and 14.4% who were 65 years of age or older. The median age was 42 years. For every 100 females, there were 104.3 males. For every 100 females age 18 and over, there were 99.9 males.

The median income for a household in the town was $36,250, and the median income for a family was $46,420. Males had a median income of $27,955 versus $26,932 for females. The per capita income for the town was $18,479. 12.2% of the population and 7.0% of families were below the poverty line, including 11.6% of those under the age of 18 and 7.2% of those 65 and older.

=== Population history ===
Lardo (now western McCall) had a population of 300 at the 1910 census, its only census entry.

=== Ancestry/Ethnicity ===
As of 2017 the largest self-identified ancestry groups/ethnic groups in McCall, Idaho were:

Largest ancestries (2017)	Percent
English	39.1%
Norwegian	19.2%
German	18.3%
Irish	12.8%
"American"	5.7%
Swedish	4.7%
Scottish	3.5%
Welsh	2.3%
French (except Basque)	1.5%

== Healthcare ==
McCall is served by St. Luke's McCall, a member of the only Idaho not-for-profit health system. The hospital was established in 1956. The community hospital completed a significant modernization and expansion from 30,000 to 65,000 square feet in 2023. Modifications included outfitting its 24 hour emergency department with a new trauma bay, triage area and additional exam rooms, modernizing diagnostic equipment for its orthopedic services, enhanced surgical care, and expanding maternal and childbirth services. St. Luke's has affiliated outpatient clinics and offers programs focused on education, fitness, prevention, and wellness. There are 33 physicians with 29 specialties affiliated with the hospital.

== Parks and recreation ==
=== Within McCall ===
Payette Lake is a glacier-carved 4,986.7 acre lake at the north end of McCall surrounded by the Payette National Forest. The average depth of the 8.3 square mile lake is120 feet with a maximum depth of 304 feet. Activities on the Lake include swimming, sailing, wake surfing, waterskiing, jet skiing, canoeing, kayaking, stand-up paddle boarding, and boating. It is a popular fishing spot with many species present including tiger muskie, walleye, crappie, smallmouth bass, and three species of trout and kokanee. Trophy-sized fish are frequently caught. There are several public and private boat launch sites including a public boat launch next to the Mile High Marina, a private marina with 175 slips. The marina offers boat and jet ski rentals, fuel, a shop and food service. There are also several options for renting boats and jet skis in town.

The McCall Recreation Area, McCall Ranger District is accessible from the City and includes French Creek Trailhead, Smokejumper Base Interpretative Site, and Upper Payette Lake Campground, Camping Area and Group Campground. There are also many opportunities for outdoor activities in the McCall area.

Ponderosa State Park offers overnight camping in a variety of standard and serviced campsites, as well as cabins for small or large groups. There are many hiking and biking trails that double for groomed cross-country ski trails in the winter. It is also home to the McCall/University of Idaho Field Campus. The Park and the community of McCall hosted the 2008 Masters World Cup Nordic Ski Races.

The McCall Municipal Golf Club is a 27 hole public course located near Ponderosa State Park.

The Harshman Skate Park, is a top 10 skate park in Idaho that was designed by the Skate Park Project, a foundation founded by Tony Hawk.

The annual Winter Carnival started in the 1941 and can bring in over 60,000 people to the town during its10 day-long celebration. The carnival features elaborate ice sculptures, fireworks, parades, live music nightly and special events in the City.

The Manchester Ice and Event Center, located in the center of the City across the street from Payette Lake, has a regulation NHL-sized hockey rink, seating for 650 spectators and a cafe. In addition to hockey games, ice skating shows and public free skate times, the Center has private lessons in freestyle and hockey, skate rentals, sharpening, bumper cars, and curling lessons and leagues.

The first annual McCall Ultra Sleddog Challenge race was held in January 2018. The race was developed by nearby resident Jerry Wortley, who had experience as a pilot for the Iditarod dogsled race in Alaska. Wortley wanted to commemorate the area's rich dog mushing tradition. Well-known musher Jessie Royer won the inaugural race.

=== Nearby ===
McCall's Little Ski Hill, formerly the "Payette Lakes Ski Area," is two miles (3.2 km) west of town on Highway 55, just over the county line in Adams County. Opened in 1937 as a diversion for local forest workers, its 76 acres (310,000 m^{2}) were donated by Carl Brown. The Little Ski Hill was the second ski area in Idaho, after Sun Valley, which opened a year earlier. It currently operates a T-bar surface lift and has a vertical drop of 405 feet (123 m), with a summit of 5,600 feet (1,710 m) above sea level, and its slopes face north and west. The aging Nordic ski jump on the lower north slope, overlooking the bend in Highway 55, was removed in the 1990s.

Brundage Mountain, northwest of McCall, opened in November 1961. Brundage has a summit elevation of 7,803 feet (2,380 m) above sea level, and a vertical drop of 1,921 feet (590 m). The slopes on Brundage Mountain are primarily west-facing and the mountain's average snowfall exceeds 320 inches (810 cm). It currently has five chairlifts and one Magic Carpet (two high-speed quad chairs, three triple chairs, and one magic carpet) with a capacity of 9,000 people per hour. The lifts afford access to 1920 acres of terrain, including 420 acres of lift-accessed, un-patrolled, without avalanche mitigation, backcountry terrain. The resort also operates a backcountry snowcat skiing operation which provides guided access to 18,000 acres (73 km^{2}) of untracked powder in the Payette National Forest north of the ski area. There are also three terrain parks of varying difficulty. Summer activities include lift-served mountain biking trails, scenic chairlift rides, summer concerts, yoga and other calendared events. Brundage was owned by the DeBoer family, descendants of early McCall pioneers, with J. R. Simplot. In April 2016, the DeBoers took full control of the property, purchasing the 50% interest of his family. In 2020, ownership was transferred to Brundage Mountain Holdings with the DeBoer family maintaining an ownership stake.

Tamarack Resort is southwest of McCall, on the west side of Cascade Reservoir, also known as Lake Cascade. Originally conceived as "Valbois" in the early 1980s, the project was revived as "WestRock" in the late 1990s and ultimately renamed "Tamarack" in 2002. Tamarack opened for lift-served skiing on December 15, 2004, with a summit elevation of 7,660 feet (2,330 m) on West Mountain, up Rock Creek. Its vertical drop was over 2,700 feet (820 m); it used five chairlifts and a poma lift. The slopes on Tamarack faced east, overlooking the Cascade Reservoir and Long Valley. The resort also offered, Osprey Meadows, an 18-hole championship golf course overlooking the Cascade Lake. The course was originally designed by Robert Trent Jones II and renovated by Robert Trent Jones Jr prior to its reopening in 2024. The resort also offers boating on Lake Cascade and miles of mountain biking trails. The resort now offers a variety of activities in addition to winter mountain sports, hosting many summer concerts, mountain biking competitions, golf tournaments and community activities.

Jug Mountain Ranch is southeast of McCall at the foot of Jughandle Mountain and includes 1,000 acres of open space. Winter activities include Nordic skiing and snowshoeing on 16 miles of groomed trails. Summer activities feature 20 miles of hiking and mountain biking on trails. In addition, Jug Mountain Ranch Golf Course provides a variety of terrain and vista. The course was designed by Don Knott, who had worked with Robert Trent Jones II, designer of Osprey Meadows at Tamarack Resort.

== Government ==
McCall was incorporated as a town on 19 July 1911. It is presently chartered as a city with a council-manager form of government. Its city manager is nominated by the mayor and elected by the city council. The McCall City Council is made up of 4 council members and a mayor elected in an at-large election. During city council meetings, the mayor presides, and all 5 members can vote on any issue. The mayor has no veto powers.

McCall is located in Idaho's 1st congressional district. On the state level, McCall is located in district 8 of the Idaho Legislature. Despite the largest population in Valley County, McCall lost the bid for county seat in 1917 to the more centrally located town of Cascade, nearly thirty miles (48 km) south on Highway 55.

== Transportation ==
McCall is approximately 100 miles (160 km) north of Boise, about a 2-hour drive, accessed via State Highway 55, the Payette River Scenic Byway, a designated national scenic byway. It heads north from Eagle in Ada County to Horseshoe Bend in Boise County, and climbs the whitewater of the Payette River to Cascade and McCall. The route turns west at Payette Lake in McCall and ends at New Meadows in Adams County, at the junction with US-95.

- SH-55 - Payette River Scenic Byway

The McCall Municipal Airport is on the south edge of town, at an elevation of 5,021 feet (1,530 m) above sea level. West of Highway 55, it is home to a U.S. Forest Service Smokejumper Base.

== Media ==
McCall is served by two four-color glossy magazines; McCall Magazine and McCall Home, both of which are published semi-annually. McCall is also served by a weekly newspaper The McCall Star-News, published on Thursdays, and a third magazine, McCall Life, published quarterly since 2019. Two radio stations, KDZY (98.3 FM Country), and Star 95.5 are based in the town.

== Climate ==
McCall experiences a dry-summer continental climate (Köppen Dsb) with cold, snowy winters and warm, relatively dry summers. The town has slightly less snow cover than the surrounding area, which has snow cover from around November 20 until early April, with 3–4 feet of snow by early February.

Climate data for McCall, Idaho (McCall Municipal Airport) (1991–2020 normals, extremes 1906–present) (Note: Snowfall and snow days from McCall COOP)
Month	Jan	Feb	Mar	Apr	May	Jun	Jul	Aug	Sep	Oct	Nov	Dec	Year
Record high °F (°C)	51 (11)	59 (15)	66 (19)	84 (29)	90 (32)	97 (36)	102 (39)	104 (40)	95 (35)	86 (30)	68 (20)	58 (14)	104 (40)
Mean maximum °F (°C)	41.1 (5.1)	45.9 (7.7)	54.7 (12.6)	67.4 (19.7)	77.8 (25.4)	84.7 (29.3)	91.4 (33.0)	90.6 (32.6)	85.1 (29.5)	73.1 (22.8)	56.0 (13.3)	41.6 (5.3)	93.0 (33.9)
Mean daily maximum °F (°C)	30.6 (−0.8)	35.2 (1.8)	42.1 (5.6)	49.9 (9.9)	61.1 (16.2)	69.0 (20.6)	81.0 (27.2)	80.5 (26.9)	70.6 (21.4)	55.6 (13.1)	40.4 (4.7)	30.1 (−1.1)	53.8 (12.1)
Daily mean °F (°C)	22.1 (−5.5)	24.9 (−3.9)	31.5 (−0.3)	38.8 (3.8)	48.5 (9.2)	55.3 (12.9)	64.1 (17.8)	62.9 (17.2)	54.2 (12.3)	42.5 (5.8)	30.9 (−0.6)	22.0 (−5.6)	41.5 (5.3)
Mean daily minimum °F (°C)	13.5 (−10.3)	14.6 (−9.7)	20.9 (−6.2)	27.7 (−2.4)	35.9 (2.2)	41.6 (5.3)	47.2 (8.4)	45.4 (7.4)	37.8 (3.2)	29.4 (−1.4)	21.3 (−5.9)	13.9 (−10.1)	29.1 (−1.6)
Mean minimum °F (°C)	−10.5 (−23.6)	−7.3 (−21.8)	1.5 (−16.9)	13.6 (−10.2)	22.5 (−5.3)	28.9 (−1.7)	35.3 (1.8)	33.2 (0.7)	24.2 (−4.3)	14.8 (−9.6)	1.8 (−16.8)	−8.3 (−22.4)	−14.3 (−25.7)
Record low °F (°C)	−35 (−37)	−33 (−36)	−22 (−30)	−17 (−27)	14 (−10)	20 (−7)	22 (−6)	20 (−7)	9 (−13)	1 (−17)	−18 (−28)	−31 (−35)	−35 (−37)
Average precipitation inches (mm)	2.46 (62)	2.32 (59)	2.71 (69)	2.43 (62)	2.30 (58)	2.03 (52)	0.58 (15)	0.54 (14)	0.96 (24)	1.60 (41)	2.30 (58)	2.83 (72)	23.06 (586)
Average snowfall inches (cm)	34.9 (89)	24.1 (61)	15.5 (39)	4.2 (11)	0.4 (1.0)	0.2 (0.51)	0.0 (0.0)	0.0 (0.0)	0.0 (0.0)	2.1 (5.3)	17.3 (44)	33.5 (85)	132.2 (336)
Average precipitation days (≥ 0.01 in)	15.5	12.9	16.0	12.6	12.8	10.0	3.2	4.6	5.5	9.1	13.2	15.3	130.7
Average snowy days (≥ 0.1 in)	11.6	8.8	7.2	2.4	0.4	0.1	0.0	0.0	0.0	1.0	7.2	12.2	50.9
Source: NOAA

== Education ==
McCall-Donnelly School District is the local school district. Students are at Barbara R. Morgan Elementary School, Payette Lakes Middle School, and McCall-Donnelly High School.

== Notable people ==
- Patty Boydstun-Hovdey - World Cup and Olympic skiing.
- Corey Engen, captain of the US Nordic ski team at the 1948 Winter Olympics
- Helen Markley Miller, writer of historical and biographical fiction for children about the Western United States
- Mack Miller, Olympic cross-country skier and trainer
- Barbara Morgan, first teacher in space
- Torrie Wilson, former WWE Wrestler
