= Idaho State Highway 72 =

State highway in Payette County, Idaho, United States

State Highway 72
- SH-72 highlighted in red

Route information
- Maintained by ITD
- Length: 1.989 mi (3.201 km)

Major junctions
- West end: US 30 in Palisades Corner
- East end: SH-52 in Hamilton Corner

Location
- Country: United States
- State: Idaho
- Counties: Payette

Highway system
- Idaho State Highway System; Interstate; US; State
← SH-71	→ SH-74

State Highway 72 (SH‑72) is a 1.989-mile (3.201 km) state highway in Payette County, Idaho, United States, that connects U.S. Route 30 (US 30), south of New Plymouth, with Idaho State Highway 52 (SH‑52) in Hamilton Corner. SH‑72 is maintained by the Idaho Transportation Department.

== Route description ==
SH‑72 begins at a T intersection with US 30, about 1.4 miles (2.3 km) south of New Plymouth. The highway heads east as a two-lane road through farmland north of the Farmers Cooperative Canal. After an intersection with Blaine Road, the highway continues east toward the unincorporated community of Hamilton Corner. At Hamilton Corner, SH‑72 reaches it eastern terminus at an intersection with SH‑52 and Sand Hollow Road.

== History ==
The entire length of SH‑72 was formerly designated as US 30, while US 30 south from the western terminus of SH‑72 to I‑84 was formerly Idaho State Highway 73. Sand Hollow Road (Old Highway 30) south from Hamilton Corner was formerly designated as US 30 before US 30 was substantially re-routed in the area. The junction with US 30 was replaced with a T-intersection in late 2017 as part of a safety improvement project that also rebuilt a cuvlert.

== Major intersections ==
The entire route is in Payette County.

Location	mi	km	Destinations	Notes
	0.00	0.00	US 30 north – New Plymouth, Fruitland, Payette; US 30	Western terminus; US 30 south formerly SH-73
Hamilton Corner	1.99	3.20	SH-52 west – Payette, Weiser; Sand Hollow Road (Old Highway 30) south – I-84, Sand Hollow	Eastern terminus; Sand Hollow Road south was former routing of US 30
Hamilton Corner	1.99	3.20	SH-52 east – Emmett, Horseshoe Bend	Continuation east from eastern terminus
1.000 mi = 1.609 km; 1.000 km = 0.621 mi

== See also ==
- List of state highways in Idaho
