= U.S. Route 30 =

Highway in the United States

U.S. Route 30
- US 30 highlighted in red

Route information
- Length: 3,112 mi (5,008 km)
- Existed: 1926–present

Major junctions
- West end: US 101 in Astoria, OR
- I-5 / I-84 at Portland, OR; I-15 at Pocatello, ID; I-25 at Cheyenne, WY; I-35 at Ames, IA; I-55 at Joliet, IL; I-65 at Merrillville, IN; I-75 at Beaverdam, OH; I-77 at Canton, OH; I-70 / I-76 at Breezewood, PA (Pennsylvania Turnpike); I-95 at Philadelphia, PA
- East end: Virginia Avenue/Absecon Boulevard in Atlantic City, NJ

Location
- Country: United States
- States: Oregon, Idaho, Wyoming, Nebraska, Iowa, Illinois, Indiana, Ohio, West Virginia, Pennsylvania, New Jersey

Highway system
- United States Numbered Highway System; List; Special; Divided
← US 29	→ US 31

U.S. Route 30 or U.S. Highway 30 (US 30) is an east–west main route of the United States Numbered Highway System, with the highway traveling across the Northern U.S. With a length of 3,112 miles (5,008 km), it is the third-longest U.S. Highway, after US 20 and US 6. The western end of the highway is at US 101 in Astoria, Oregon; the eastern end is at Virginia Avenue, Absecon Boulevard, and Adriatic Avenue in Atlantic City, New Jersey. The "0" as the last digit in the number indicates that it is a coast-to-coast route and a major east–west route. Despite long stretches of parallel and concurrent Interstate Highways, it has not been decommissioned like other long-haul routes such as US 66. It is also the only U.S. Highway that has always been coast-to-coast since the beginning of U.S. Numbered Highway System.

US 20 and US 30 break the general U.S. Highway numbering rules in Oregon, since US 20 actually starts south of US 30 in Newport, running through the middle of Oregon, while US 30 runs parallel to the north of the state (the Columbia River and Interstate 84, or I-84). The two run concurrently and continue in the correct positioning near Caldwell, Idaho. This situation is because US 20 was not a planned coast-to-coast route while US 30 was.

Much of the historic Lincoln Highway, the first road across the U.S. (from New York City to San Francisco), became part of US 30; it is still known by that name in many areas.

== Route description ==
Lengths
	mi	km
OR	477	768
ID	455	732
WY	454	731
NE	451	726
IA	330	530
IL	151	243
IN	152	245
OH	245	394
WV	3	4.8
PA	333	536
NJ	58	93
Total	3,112	5,008

=== Oregon ===
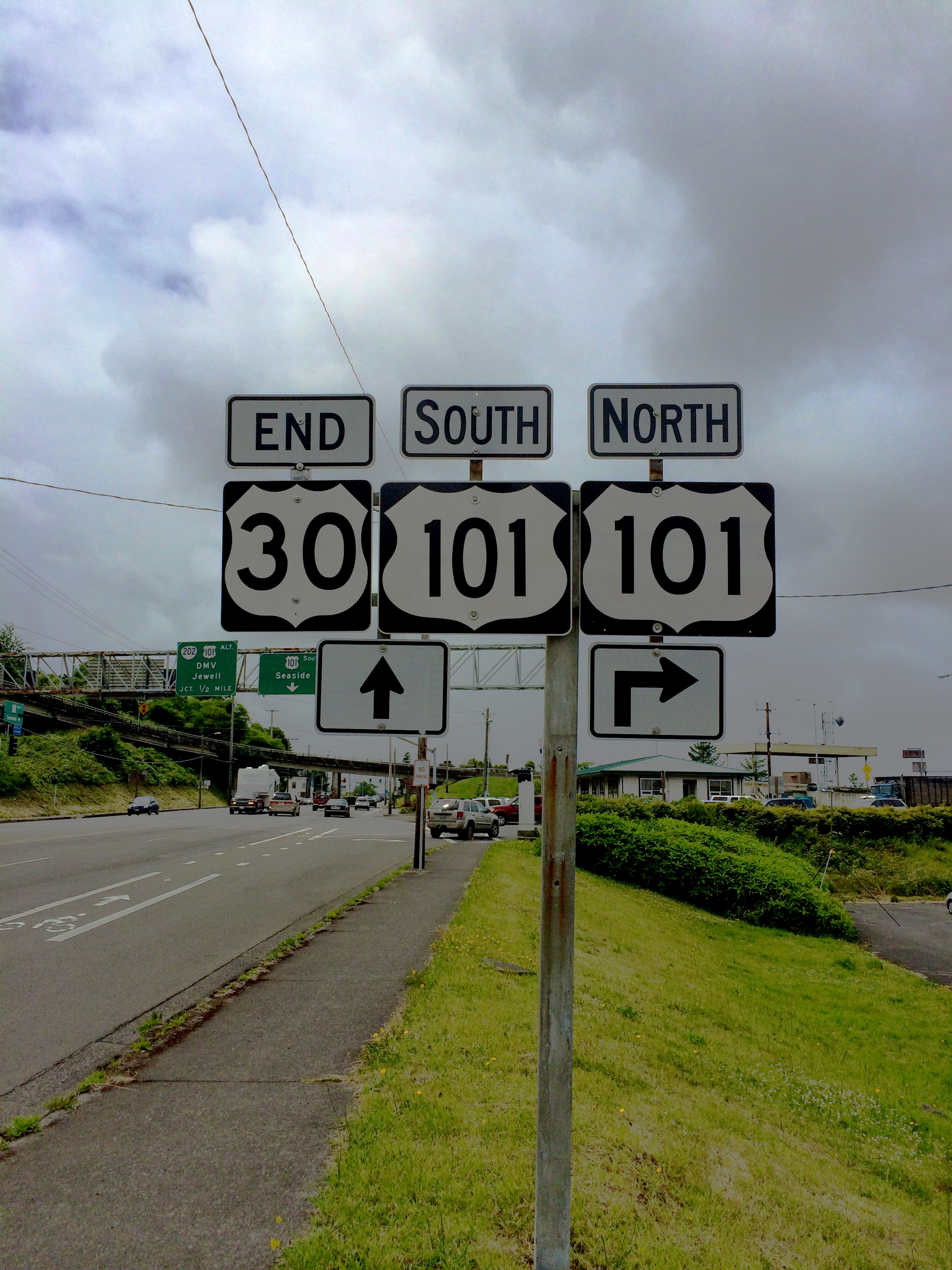
Western terminus of US 30 in Astoria, Oregon

The western terminus of US 30 is at an intersection with US 101 at the southern end of the Astoria–Megler Bridge in downtown Astoria, Oregon, approximately five miles (8.0 km) from the Pacific Ocean. It heads east to Portland, where it uses a short section of freeway built for the canceled I-505. From there, it heads around the north side of downtown on I-405 and I-5 to reach I-84. Most of the rest of the route is concurrent with I‑84, with only about 70 miles (110 km), under a fifth of its remaining length, off the freeway, mainly on old alignments.

=== Idaho ===
Upon entering Idaho, US 30 runs along its old surface route through Fruitland and New Plymouth before joining I‑84. It leaves at Bliss and soon crosses the Snake River, running south of it through Twin Falls and Burley before crossing it again and rejoining I‑84. At the split with I-86, US 30 continues east with I‑86 almost to its end at Pocatello. US 30 cuts southeast through downtown Pocatello to I-15, where it heads south to McCammon. There, it exits and heads east and southeast into Wyoming, not paralleling an Interstate Highway for the first time since Portland.

=== Wyoming ===
In Wyoming, US 30 heads southeast through Kemmerer to Granger, where it joins I-80 across the southern part of the state. It is also here that it joins the historic Lincoln Highway. As in the previous two states, US 30 remains with the Interstate Highway for most of its path, only leaving for the old route in the following places:

- 97 miles (156 km) from Walcott to Laramie
- 12 miles (19 km) through Cheyenne
- 2 miles (3.2 km) through Pine Bluffs to the Nebraska state line

=== Nebraska ===
Unlike the three states to the west, Nebraska keeps US 30 completely separate from its parallel Interstates (I-80 in this case). From the state line to Grand Island, US 30 closely parallels I‑80. East of Grand Island, US 30 diverges from I‑80 and runs northeast toward Columbus on a highway parallel to the Platte River. At Columbus, it turns east toward Schuyler and Fremont and crosses the Missouri River into Iowa east of Blair.

=== Iowa ===
US 30 crosses Iowa from west to east approximately 20 miles (32 km) north of I-80. Between Missouri Valley and Denison, US 30 runs in a southwest–northeast direction. The majority of US 30 east of Ames and west of the Mount Vernon–Cedar Rapids area (138 miles or 222 kilometers) is a rural four-lane divided highway. A portion of the highway in Tama County is being upgraded to a divided highway. US 30 between Mount Vernon and Dewitt is a two–lane highway. It crosses the Mississippi River into Illinois on the Gateway Bridge at Clinton.

US 30S and US 30A are two previous alternate alignments of US 30 in Iowa. They followed the original alignment of US 30 in the state. They both began in Nebraska, entered Iowa in Council Bluffs, and extended north to Missouri Valley via Crescent to meet the current highway.

=== Illinois ===
US 30 heads east in Illinois to Rock Falls, where it begins to parallel I-88. At Aurora, it turns southeast to Joliet, where it is a major thoroughfare in the city of Joliet (Plainfield Road), and then back east through New Lenox, Frankfort, Mokena, Matteson, Olympia Fields, Park Forest, Chicago Heights, Ford Heights, and Lynwood to the Indiana state line, bypassing Chicago to the south. Notwithstanding, the original 1926 routing of US 30 ran directly through downtown Chicago.

=== Indiana ===
US 30 in Indiana is a major rural divided highway. It is not a freeway except at Fort Wayne, where it runs around the north side on I-69 and I-469. Between I-65 (at Merrillville) and I‑69 (at Fort Wayne), there are over 40 traffic signals on this divided highway, hindering smooth traffic flow. This is especially pronounced near Warsaw and Columbia City, where the speed limit is reduced as the highway runs through a commercial section with many businesses and traffic signals. Many of the other signals are concentrated between Hobart and Valparaiso, the two cities being about 20 miles (32 km) apart. It is, however, a four-lane divided road through its entirety within Indiana, generally avoiding small towns. Speed limits range but are generally 60 mph (97 km/h).

=== Ohio ===
US 30 continues into Ohio, where it is mainly a four-lane divided highway until Canton. A proposal to make US 30 a limited-access freeway from Trump Avenue and State Route 11 (SR 11) was set in 2019 and federal funding set $18 million (equivalent to $22.3 million in 2025) to construct the new freeway. As of 2020, the only sections that were limited access freeways are in Van Wert, Bucyrus, Mansfield, Wooster, and Canton. A section between I-71 and US 250 is a divided four-lane highway. A section between SR 57 and SR 172 is a four-lane divided highway, with traffic signals at two intersections. The highway passes through Van Wert. After Van Wert, it travels through Upper Sandusky where the highway runs concurrently with US 23. The section between Mansfield and Canton follows the old Lincoln Highway. The last remaining segments that will be upgraded to a freeway are past Canton; currently, the highway is a two-lane route that passes through East Canton, Minerva, and Lisbon. After Lisbon, it runs concurrently with SR 45 for three miles (4.8 km) and becomes a freeway. Designated with signs marking routes SR 11, SR 7, SR 39, and US 30. After joining SR 11, SR 7 becomes a part of the freeway where all three routes split in East Liverpool where US 30 joins SR 39 for one mile (1.6 km) and US 30 crosses the Ohio River into West Virginia.

=== West Virginia ===
US 30 runs for only about four miles (6.4 km) in West Virginia. It crosses the Ohio River over the Jennings Randolph Bridge, continuing the freeway from the Ohio section. After cutting through the town of Chester with only one interchange, West Virginia Route 2 (Carolina Avenue), the freeway section ends not too long after. US 30 continues across the northernmost piece of the Northern Panhandle on a two-lane road.

=== Pennsylvania ===
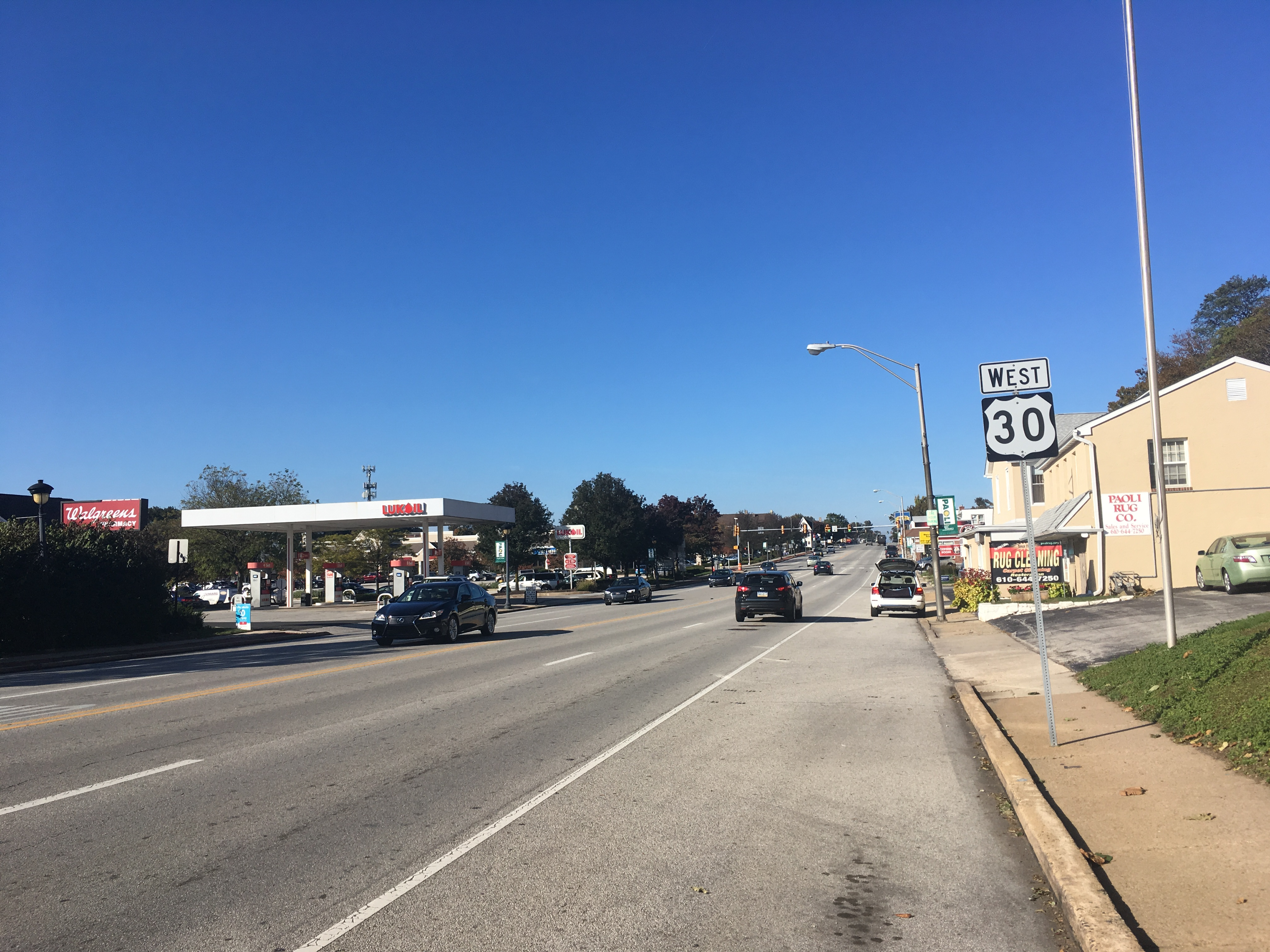
US 30 westbound in Paoli, Pennsylvania, along the Philadelphia Main Line, October 2018

US 30 heads southeast into Pennsylvania, joining US 22 and then the Penn-Lincoln Parkway West west of Pittsburgh. It heads through downtown Pittsburgh on I-376/US 22, leaving at Wilkinsburg for its own alignment. From there, it roughly parallels the Pennsylvania Turnpike (I-76) to the Philadelphia area, though, in many areas, particularly from York past Lancaster, and bypassing Coatesville, Downingtown, and Exton, it is far enough from the Pennsylvania Turnpike to require its own freeway. In Somerset County it mainly follows the old route of the Forbes Road. As it approaches Philadelphia, US 30 constitutes the main road of the Philadelphia Main Line, a string of affluent suburbs west of the city; often called Lancaster Avenue and Lancaster Pike through this stretch. US 30 then briefly joins I‑76 near Center City, Philadelphia, splitting onto I-676 as it crosses the Delaware River on the Benjamin Franklin Bridge.

=== New Jersey ===
US 30 splits from I-676 just east of the Benjamin Franklin Bridge toll plaza in Camden and heads southeast to Atlantic City, generally parallel to the Atlantic City Expressway, passing through the New Jersey Pine Barrens. For most of its New Jersey run, it is known as the White Horse Pike. It ends in Atlantic City at the intersection of Absecon Boulevard, Virginia Avenue, and Adriatic Avenue, about 0.5 miles (0.80 km) from the Atlantic Ocean.

== History ==
US 30 was originally proposed to run from Salt Lake City, Utah, to Atlantic City, New Jersey. West of Philadelphia, Pennsylvania, this was designated largely along the Lincoln Highway, as part of a promise to the Lincoln Highway Association to assign a single number to their road as much as possible. West of Salt Lake City, US 40 continued to San Francisco, California, although it ran farther north than the Lincoln Highway east of Wadsworth, Nevada, and west of Sacramento, California.

The governments of Idaho and Oregon objected to Salt Lake City as the terminus for US 30 and requested extensions. What is now US 30 through those states (west of Burley, Idaho) had been designated as part of US 20, another transcontinental route, but traveled through Yellowstone National Park and was inaccessible during the winter season. The states agreed to take US 30 along that route, splitting from the route to Salt Lake City at Granger, Wyoming, and running along what had been designated as US 530. (That number was then reused for the spur toward Salt Lake City.) The planned US 530 had ended at US 91 at McCammon, Idaho, where the new US 30 turned north to Pocatello, meeting the planned US 20. (US 20 was truncated to Yellowstone National Park but later extended along its own route to the Pacific Ocean.) What had been designated as US 630, from US 30 at Echo to Ogden, Utah, was to be extended east on former US 30 to US 30 at Granger and northwest on US 91 and what had been designated US 191 to US 30 at Burley.

Utah objected to that plan, however, as it removed US 30 from that state, giving them only US 630, a branch. A compromise was reached, in which the US 630 route would become the main line of US 30, once improved to higher standards, but that was still not deemed completely satisfactory. Ultimately, in the final system, a split was approved between Burley, Idaho, and Granger, Wyoming, with US 30N running along the modern routing US 30, and US 30S taking the route through Utah (planned as US 630). In the final plan (dated November 11, 1926), the route toward Salt Lake City became US 530, ending at US 40 at Kimball Junction, Utah.

Around 1931, a split in Ohio was designated, from Delphos east to Mansfield. The original US 30 was assigned US 30S, and a straighter route became US 30N. US 30S was eliminated c. 1975, putting US 30 on former US 30N.

US 30 was rerouted c. 1931 to bypass Omaha, Nebraska, and Council Bluffs, Iowa, to the north. The former route, from Fremont, Nebraska, to Missouri Valley, Iowa, was designated US 30S. Around 1934, it was truncated to Omaha and c. 1939 it was changed from US 30S to US 30A and was removed from service in 1969 when the historic Douglas Street bridge was demolished. Later sections were relocated to parallel Interstate Highways in several states, including I-84 in Oregon and Idaho.

A signed US 30 Bypass was created in Portland, Oregon, beginning at the St. Johns Bridge, following (roughly) Lombard Street in North Portland, continuing along Sandy Boulevard, and rejoining the I-84/US 30 route in the center of the town of Wood Village. Portland also had a US 30 Business route along Northeast Sandy Boulevard; the route, however, was decommissioned in 2007.

In 1988, Pennsylvania Department of Transportation (PennDOT) engineers proposed that US 30 be rerouted and upgraded to a four-lane controlled-access expressway through a portion of Lancaster County. The American Farmland Trust (AFT) opposed the plan because, according to Jim Riggle, then Director of Operations at AFT, it "would have cut right through the heart of the best farmland [and] would probably have been the death knell of the Amish community". The plans were averted when more than a thousand Amish people, people who do not usually participate in the public process, "drove their buggies to the meeting hall and expressed their concern by simply sitting quietly in the audience in their black homespun suits".

== Major intersections ==
Oregon
US 101 in Astoria
I-405 in Portland. The highways travel concurrently through the city.
I-5 / I-405 in Portland. I-5/US 30 travel concurrently through the city.
I-5 / I-84 in Portland. I-84/US 30 travel concurrently to Cascade Locks.
I-205 in Portland
I-205 in Portland
I-205 in Portland
I-84 in Cascade Locks. The highways travel concurrently to Hood River.
I-84 in Hood River. The highways travel concurrently to Mosier.
I-84 in The Dalles
US 197 in The Dalles. The highways travel concurrently through the city.
I-84 / US 197 in The Dalles. I-84/US 30 travel concurrently to Pendleton.
US 97 east-northeast of The Dalles
US 730 east of Boardman
I-82 southwest of Hermiston
US 395 in Stanfield. The highways travel concurrently to Pendleton.
I-84 in Gopher Flats. The highways travel concurrently to La Grande.
I-84 southeast of La Grande. The highways travel concurrently to North Powder.
I-84 in Baker City. The highways travel concurrently to south of Fruitland, Idaho.
Idaho
I-84 / US 95 south of Fruitland. US 30/US 95 travel concurrently to Palisades Corner.
I-84 south of New Plymouth. The highways travel concurrently to west-northwest of Bliss.
US 20 / US 26 north of Caldwell. The highways travel concurrently to Caldwell.
I-184 in Boise.
US 20 / US 26 in Boise. US 20/US 30 travel concurrently to Mountain Home. US 26/US 30 travel concurrently to west-northwest of Bliss.
US 93 east of Filer. The highways travel concurrently to Twin Falls.
I-84 in Heyburn. The highways travel concurrently to northeast of Declo.
I-84 / I-86 northeast of Declo. I-86/US 30 travel concurrently to west of Chubbuck.
US 91 in Pocatello. The highways travel concurrently to northwest of McCammon.
I-15 in Pocatello. The highways travel concurrently to northwest of McCammon.
US 89 in Montpelier. The highways travel concurrently through the city.
Wyoming
US 189 in Kemmerer
I-80 in Little America. The highways travel concurrently to south-southeast of Walcott.
US 191 in Purple Sage. The highways travel concurrently to Rock Springs.
US 287 east of Rawlins. The highways travel concurrently to Laramie.
I-80 southeast of Laramie. The highways travel concurrently to southwest of Cheyenne.
I-25 / US 87 in Cheyenne
I-180 / US 85 in Cheyenne
I-80 east-northeast of Cheyenne. The highways travel concurrently to Pine Bluffs.
Nebraska
US 385 in Sidney. The highways travel concurrently to Chappell.
US 138 north of Big Springs
US 26 west-southwest of Ogallala. The highways travel concurrently to Ogallala.
US 83 in North Platte
US 283 in Lexington
US 281 in Grand Island
US 81 south of Columbus. The highways travel concurrently to Columbus.
US 77 / US 275 north of Fremont. US 30/US 275 travel concurrently to east-northeast of Fremont.
US 75 in Blair. The highways travel concurrently through the city.
Iowa
I-29 in Missouri Valley
US 59 in Denison. The highways travel concurrently through the city.
US 71 in Carroll
US 169 on the Amaqua–Beaver township line. The highways travel concurrently to Ogden.
US 69 in Ames
I-35 southeast of Ames
US 65 in Colo
US 63 in Toledo
US 218 in Fremont Township. The highways travel concurrently to Cedar Rapids.
US 151 in Cedar Rapids. The highways travel concurrently to Bertram Township.
I-380 / US 218 in Cedar Rapids
US 61 in De Witt. The highways travel concurrently to southwest of De Witt.
US 67 in Clinton. The highways travel concurrently through the city.
Illinois

I-88 Toll / IL 110 (CKC) southeast of Rock Falls
US 52 north of Amboy
I-39 / US 51 southwest of Lee
US 34 in Oswego. The highways travel concurrently to Montgomery.
I-55 in Joliet
US 6 in Joliet. The highways travel concurrently through the city.
I-80 in New Lenox
US 45 in Frankfort
I-57 in Matteson
Indiana
US 41 in Schererville
I-65 in Merrillville
US 421 in Wanatah
US 35 in Davis Township
US 31 east of Plymouth
US 33 in Fort Wayne. The highways travel concurrently through the city.
I-69 / US 33 in Fort Wayne. I-69/US 30 travel concurrently through the city.
US 27 in Fort Wayne
I-469 north-northeast of Fort Wayne. The highways travel concurrently to New Haven.
US 24 northeast of New Haven. The highways travel concurrently to New Haven.
Ohio
US 224 in Pleasant Township. The highways travel concurrently to Van Wert.
US 127 / US 224 north of Van Wert
US 68 in Madison Township
US 23 in Salem Township. The highways travel concurrently to Crane Township.
US 42 in Madison Township
I-71 in Mifflin Township
US 250 in Plain Township. The highways travel concurrently to Wooster Township.
US 62 in Massillon. The highways travel concurrently to Canton.
I-77 / US 62 in Canton
SR 11 from West Point to West Virginia state line
West Virginia
WV 2 in Chester
Pennsylvania
US 22 in North Fayette Township. The highways travel concurrently to Wilkinsburg.
I-376 in Robinson Township. The highways travel concurrently to Wilkinsburg.
I-79 southwest of Pennsbury Village
US 19 in Pittsburgh. The highways travel concurrently approximately 1 mile (1.6 km).
I-279 in Pittsburgh
I-76 Toll in North Huntingdon Township (Pennsylvania Turnpike)
US 119 in Southwest Greensburg
US 219 in Jenner Township
Future I-99 / US 220 in Bedford Township
I-70 in Breezewood. The highways travel concurrently through the town.
US 522 in Todd Township
US 11 in Chambersburg
I-81 in Chambersburg
US 15 in Straban Township
I-83 in Manchester Township
US 222 in Manheim Township. The highways travel concurrently through the township.
US 322 in Caln Township
US 202 in West Whiteland Township
I-476 in Radnor Township
US 1 on the Lower Merion Township–Philadelphia line
I-76 in Philadelphia. The highways travel concurrently through the city.
I-76 / I-676 in Philadelphia. I-676/US 30 travel concurrently to Camden, New Jersey.
I-95 in Philadelphia
New Jersey
US 130 in Pennsauken Township. The highways travel concurrently to Collingswood.
I-295 in Barrington
US 206 in Hammonton
US 9 in Absecon
Virginia Avenue/Absecon Boulevard/Adriatic Avenue in Atlantic City

== Special routes ==
There are 13 current special routes connected to US 30 in Oregon, Wyoming, Nebraska, Iowa, Ohio and Pennsylvania. There are 11 examples of former specials routes as well.

== Related routes ==
- US 130 in New Jersey
- US 230 (former) in Pennsylvania
- US 330 (former) in Illinois
- US 430 (former) in Illinois
- US 530 (former) in Utah
- US 630 (former) in Oregon
- US 730 in Oregon and Washington
- US 830 (former) in Washington

== See also ==
- List of United States Numbered Highways
- Lincoln Highway

Browse numbered routes
← WYO 28	WY	→ WYO 30
