= Hamilton Corner, Idaho =

Unincorporated community in Payette County, Idaho, United States

- Unincorporated community
- Location of Hamilton Corner in Idaho Location of Hamilton Corner in the United States
- Coordinates: 43°57′10″N 116°46′21″W
- Country: United States
- State: Idaho
- County: Payette
- Elevation: 2,280 ft (690 m)
- Time zone: UTC-7 (Mountain (MST))
  - Summer (DST): UTC-6 (MDT)
- Area codes: 208, 986
- GNIS feature ID: 376160

Hamilton Corner is an unincorporated community in Payette County, Idaho, United States, about 2.6 miles (4.2 km) east-southeast of New Plymouth.

== Description ==
The community is located at the junction of Idaho State Highway 52 and Idaho State Highway 72 (SH-72). However, the entire length of SH-72 was part of a former routing of U.S. Route 30 (US 30). In addition, Sand Hollow Road (also known as Old Highway 30), which runs south from the community, was also part of the former routing of US 30.
