= French Corner, Idaho =

Unincorporated community in Payette County, Idaho, United States

- Unincorporated community
- Location within Idaho Location within the United States
- Coordinates: 44°03′27″N 116°34′50″W
- Country: United States
- State: Idaho
- County: Payette
- Elevation: 2,477 ft (755 m)
- Time zone: UTC-7 (Mountain (MST))
  - Summer (DST): UTC-6 (MDT)
- Area codes: 208, 986
- GNIS feature ID: 376156

French Corner is a remote unincorporated community in Payette County, Idaho, United States. The community located just north of the mouth of Dry Creek on the Big Willow Creek, roughly 13.3 miles (21.4 km) north-northwest of Emmett.Plaisades Corner, Idaho
