= Palisades Corner, Idaho =

Unincorporated community in Payette County, Idaho, United States

- Unincorporated community
- Location within Idaho Location within the United States
- Coordinates: 43°58′31″N 116°54′46″W
- Country: United States
- State: Idaho
- County: Payette
- Elevation: 2,280 ft (690 m)
- Time zone: UTC-7 (Mountain (MST))
  - Summer (DST): UTC-6 (MDT)
- Area codes: 208, 986
- GNIS feature ID: 376174

Palisades Corner is an unincorporated community in Payette County, Idaho, United States, roughly 2 miles (3.2 km) south of Fruitland.

Palisades Corner is located at the junction of U.S. Route 30 (US 30) and U.S. Route 95 (US 95) just north of the Interstate 84/US 95 interchange.
