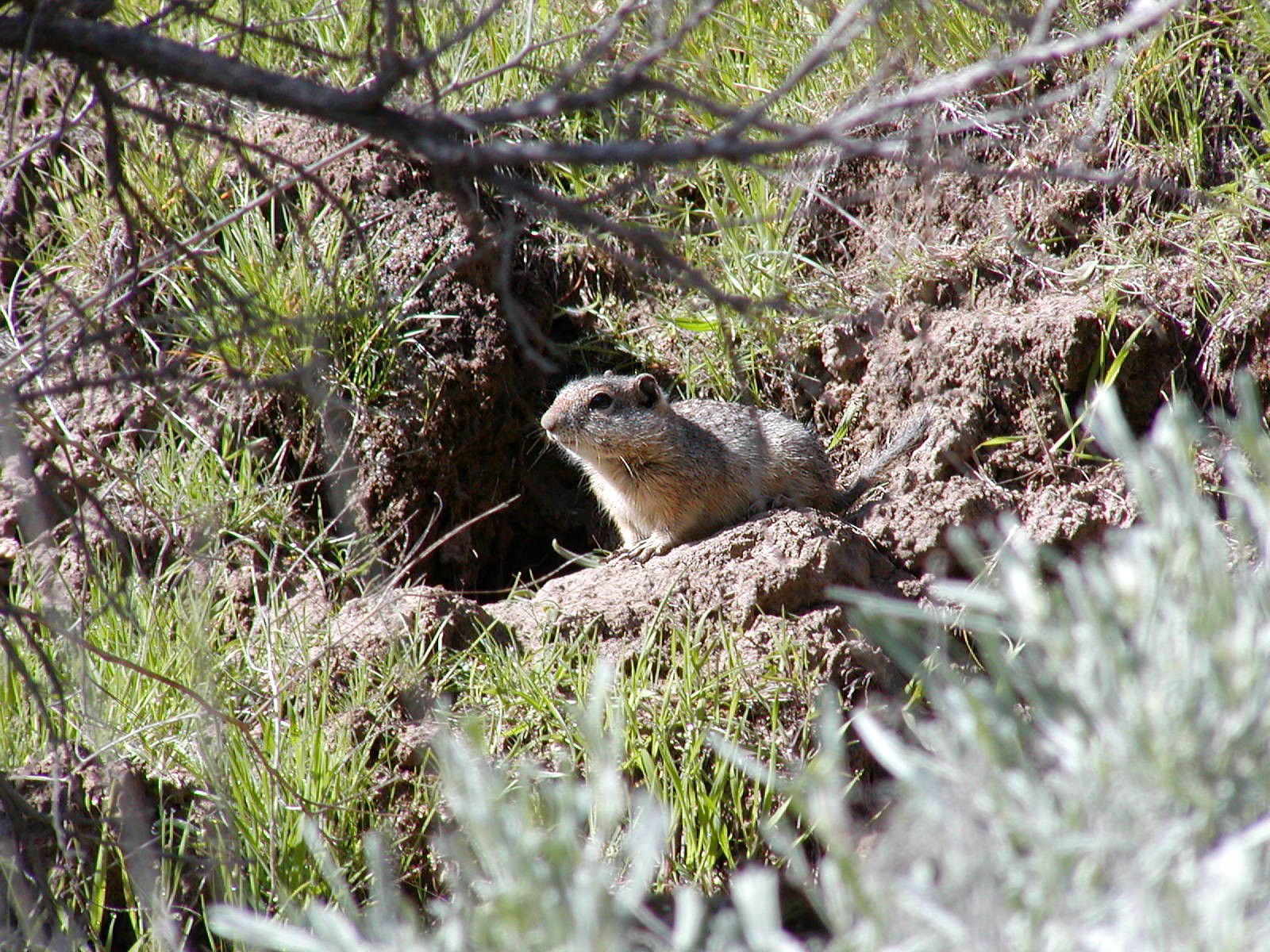

Conservation status
- Vulnerable (IUCN 3.1)

Scientific classification
- Kingdom: Animalia
- Phylum: Chordata
- Class: Mammalia
- Order: Rodentia
- Family: Sciuridae
- Genus: Urocitellus
- Species: U. endemicus

Binomial name
- Urocitellus endemicus (Yensen, 1991)

= Southern Idaho ground squirrel =

Species of rodent

The southern Idaho ground squirrel (Urocitellus endemicus) is a species of the largest genus of ground squirrels. This species and the Northern Idaho ground squirrel were previously considered conspecific, together called the Idaho ground squirrel.

== Description ==
The species has sexual dimorphism, with males being normally larger than females. Their weight ranges from 120 to 290 grams (0.26 to 0.64 lb) and are on average 233 millimetres (9.2 in) in length, though their range is 209 to 258 millimetres (8.2 to 10.2 in).

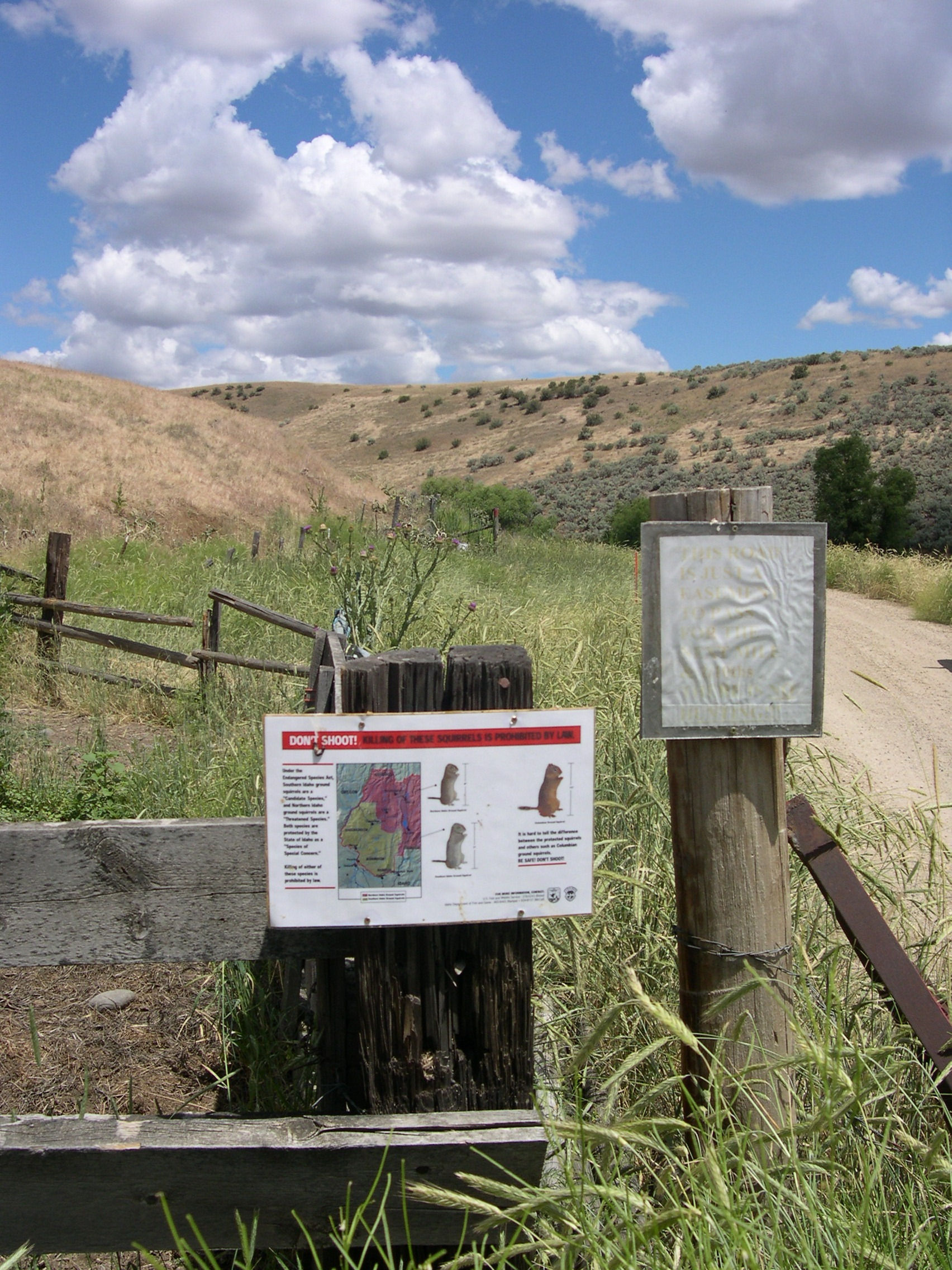
"Don't shoot" squirrels sign in Southwestern Idaho

== Behavior ==
The southern Idaho ground squirrel can be found in an area about 30 by 70 kilometers (19 by 43 miles) extending from Emmett, Idaho, northwest to Weiser, Idaho, and the surrounding area of Squaw Butte, Midvale Hill, and Henley Basin in Gem, Payette, and Washington counties.

Its range is bounded on the south by the Payette River, on the west by the Snake River and on the northeast by lava flows. Their habitat is typified by rolling hills, basins, and flats at an altitude of between 670 and 975 meters (2,198 and 3,199 ft).
