= Payette School District =

School district in Idaho, United States

Location
- Payette Idaho United States

District information
- Type: Public
- Grades: Pre K-12
- Established: 1885
- Superintendent: Dr. Glen Croft

Other information
- Website: www.payetteschools.org

Payette Joint School District 371 is a school district headquartered in Payette, Idaho. The approximately 167 square miles of area includes Payette and a small section of Fruitland in Payette and Washington Counties.

== History ==
The Payette School District was established in 1885, when the area that is now Payette County was part of Ada County. Classes were initially held in a single-room schoolhouse until 1890, when the Central School was constructed in what is now Central Park, across from the Post Office on Center Avenue and South 9th Street. The district employed four teachers until 1899, when growing enrollment led to an expansion to eight.

A high school wing was added to the Central School in 1905. John E. Turner became superintendent of Payette city schools in 1907. By that time, the district operated three buildings with 900 students enrolled, including 204 in the high school. The district was among the first in Idaho to establish dedicated departments for music, drawing, home economics, and manual training.

In 1921, the two-story Payette Public School burned down in a fire. A new junior high school was built the same year with eight classrooms for students from grades one through eight and was used until 1948 when Westside School was built for elementary school students. On November 2, 1956, a fire broke out in the boiler room of Payette High School. In 1957 there was a bond proposal for a rebuilt junior high school and a new high school. Residents were required to vote 66% in favor, but the vote was only about 63.7% in favor In 1962, a new junior high school was constructed on 6th Avenue for grades seven and eight, while grades nine through twelve remained at the school on Center Avenue. In 1974, the junior high and high school switched locations. In 1988, the junior high school was renamed Warren E. McCain Middle School in honor of Warren McCain, an Albertsons executive and Payette High School graduate who funded scholarships for local students to attend the College of Idaho. Payette Primary School was constructed in 1992, and a new McCain Middle School building was completed in 2004.

Enrollment in the Payette School District declined from 1,506 students in 2018 to 1,334 in 2020. In 2020, Payette School District joined the program for four-day school weeks. In 2024 the district's board of trustees voted unanimously to close Westside Elementary and shift students to Payette Primary and McCain Middle.

As of the 2024–25 school year, the Payette Joint School District had a total enrollment of 1,315 students. The student body is 61.7% White, 34.3% Hispanic or Latino, 3.0% multiracial, 0.4% Black or African American, 0.2% Asian, 0.2% Native American or Alaska Native, and 0.2% Native Hawaiian or Pacific Islander.

== Special Programs ==
Payette School District offers career and technical education (CTE) programs at the high school level. In 2017, the district added commercial welding, certified nursing assistant, and automated manufacturing courses, allowing students to graduate with a welding certificate or CNA license. Other CTE programs include EMT training, culinary arts, early childhood education, horticulture, and business management. The CTE center opened in August 2018.

In 2024, the district purchased a former auto dealership for $1.5 million to convert into a 16,000-square-foot CTE center. The new facility, funded through state House Bill 521, will house existing programs and allow the district to add automotive maintenance, collision repair, heavy equipment and diesel technology, and construction trades. The center is expected to open in the 2025–26 school year.

== Schools ==
- Payette High School
- McCain Middle School (becoming a grade 5-8 school effective 2024)
- Payette Primary School (becoming a Pre-Kindergarten-grade 4 school effective 2024)
- Payette Academy

=== Former schools ===
- Westside Elementary School (closed in 2024)
