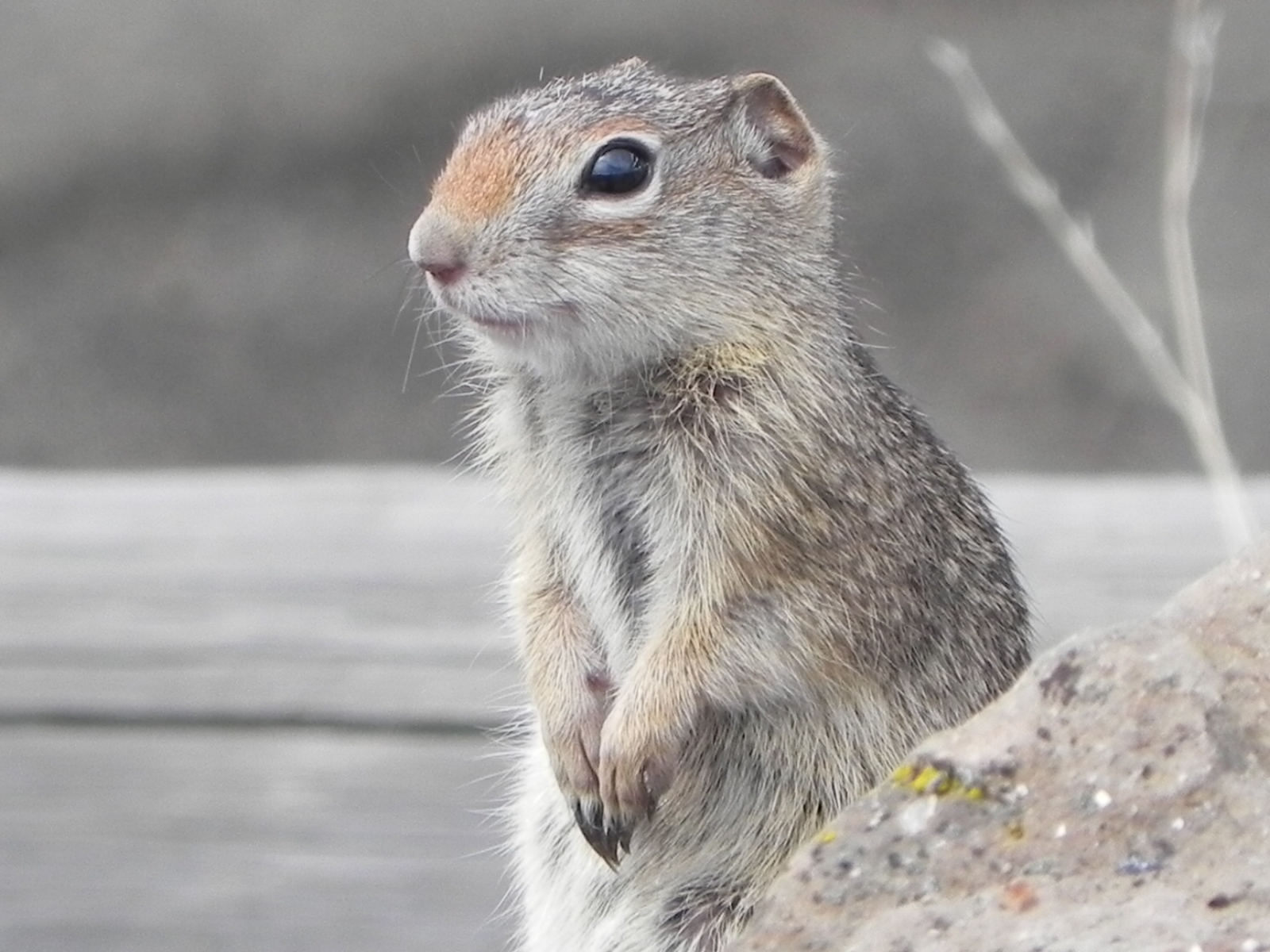

Conservation status
- Endangered (IUCN 3.1)

Scientific classification
- Kingdom: Animalia
- Phylum: Chordata
- Class: Mammalia
- Order: Rodentia
- Family: Sciuridae
- Genus: Urocitellus
- Species: U. brunneus

Binomial name
- Urocitellus brunneus (A. H. Howell, 1928)
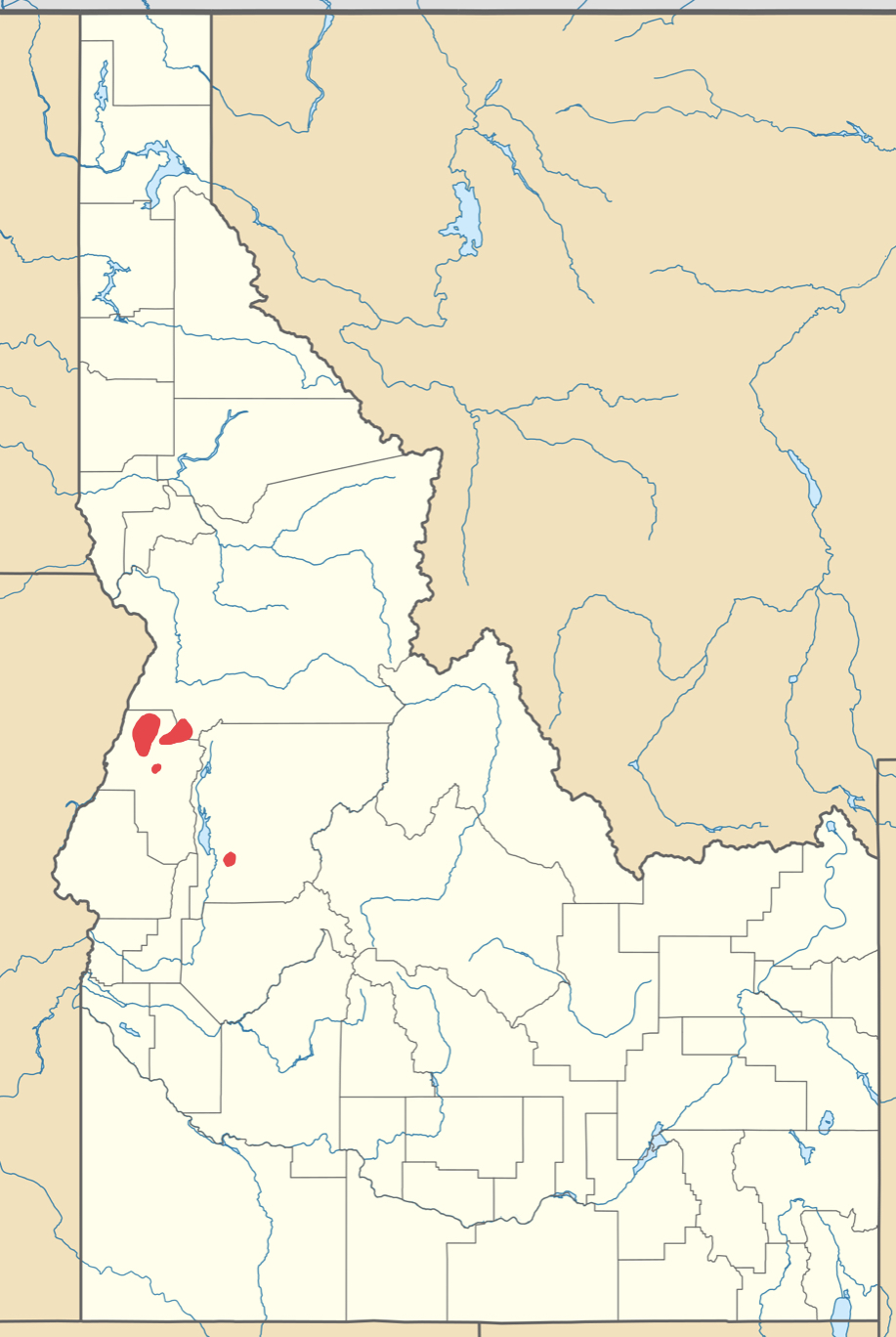
- distribution of NIDGS

= Northern Idaho ground squirrel =

Species of rodent

The northern Idaho ground squirrel (Urocitellus brunneus) is a species of the largest genus of ground squirrels. This species and the southern Idaho ground squirrel were previously considered conspecific, together called the Idaho ground squirrel.

The species is about 233 mm in length and weighs 120 to 290 grams. The northern Idaho ground squirrel has sexual dimorphism and a dark-reddish gray coat.

The squirrel hibernates for 8 months and lives in dry meadows in Adams and Valley Counties in western-central Idaho. They eat forbs, grasses, shrubs, trees, rushes, and sedges. The mating season occurs within two weeks from the start of the active period and lasts about 12–13 days. Females only have one litter per year, and there are about five weaned babies per litter, which leave the burrow around late March-early April.

In 2000, the species was classified as threatened under the Endangered Species Act mostly due to habitat loss. There are about 2000 individuals remaining, but the population is increasing resulting from conservation efforts. A recovery plan for the species was put in place by the U.S. Fish and Wildlife Service in 2003 and forest restoration for the species is anticipated to be done by 2027.

== Description ==
The species has sexual dimorphism, with males being normally larger than females. Their weight ranges from 120 to 290 grams, and they are, on average, 233 mm in length, though their range is 209 mm to 258 mm. They have a dark-reddish grey coat with reddish-brown spots. Some of the northern Idaho ground squirrel's qualities include tan feet and ears, a tail, a brownish-grey throat, and a white eye ring.

== Diet and life history ==
The northern Idaho ground squirrel has an 8-month hibernation period from August to late April. Their diet consists of mostly forbs, grasses, shrubs, trees, rushes, and sedges. The squirrel's active season is from April to July, and then the species spends the rest of the year hibernating.

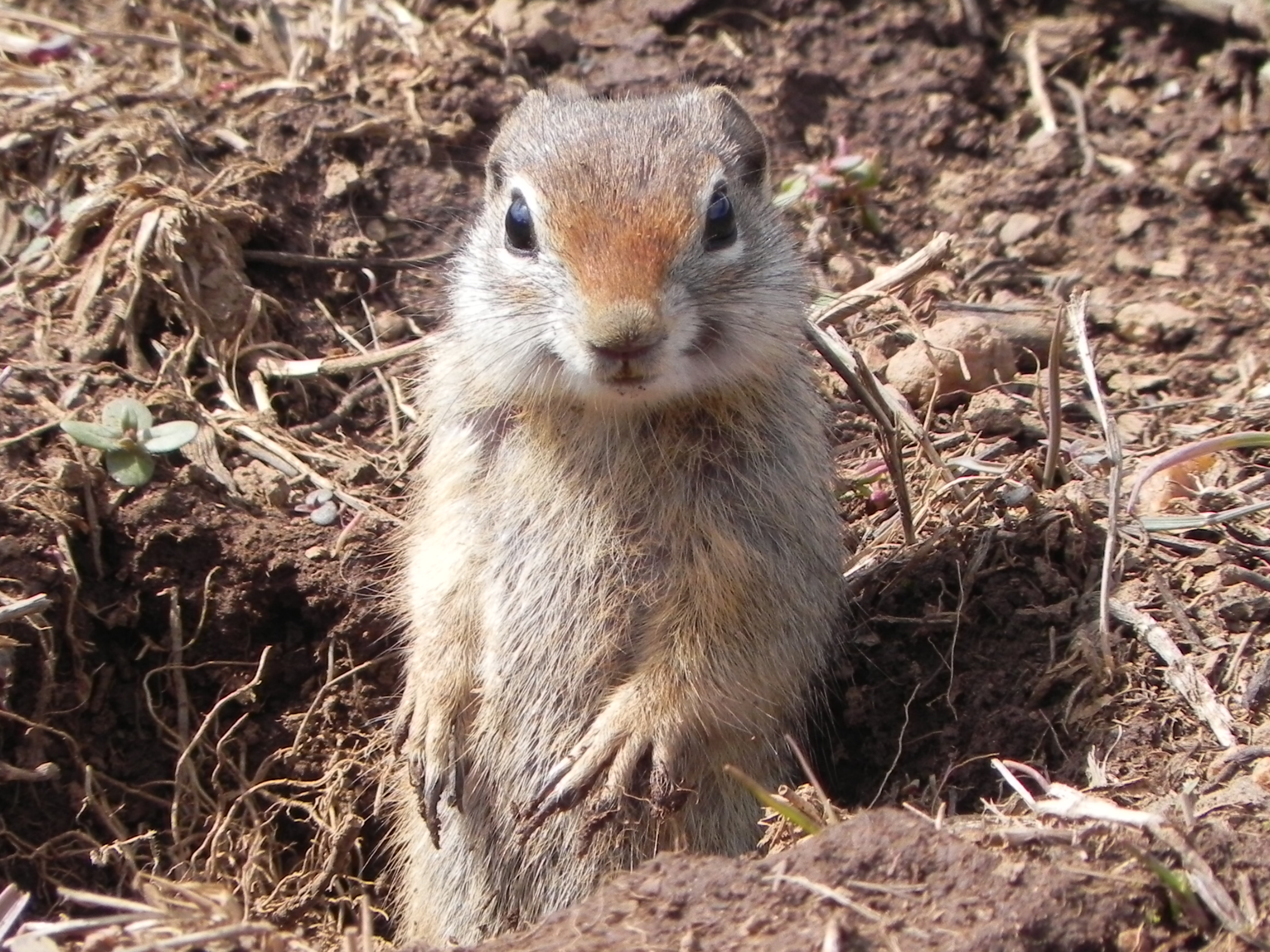

Within the first two weeks of the active period, the NIDGS starts reproducing. Females reproduce only once per year. In the mating process, the males protect the sexually receptive females from other potential male rivals. Mating occurs over about 2 weeks. Copulations occur underground. Males depart from the female's burrow after mating, and they do not provide paternal care to pups or protection to their mates. The gestation period of the species is 3.5 weeks. There are 4-6 weaned pups per litter. Juveniles leave their natal burrow at weaning (late-April to early-May), and begin dispersing soon thereafter.

The species constructs three types of burrows: nest burrows, auxiliary burrows, and hibernation burrows. Nest burrows are for mating and raising young; they are usually 5–120 cm deep, with 3-11 surface openings, 2-13 branching tunnels, and 1-7 chambers; in well-drained soil the nest is in the deepest part of the burrow. The auxiliary ("escape") burrows do not contain nests; they are linear, less than 50 cm, built 100 m from nest burrows, and are constructed in shallow soils. The third burrow type is the hibernation burrow, is a single tunnel that descends deeply 100-150 cm. The squirrels disperse the soil around their burrows instead of leaving a pile of soil at the opening, which makes the entrance of the burrows less visible.

== Distribution and habitat ==
The habitat of the northern Idaho ground squirrel consists of dry rocky meadows. Ground with deep soil and scattered with ponderosa pine and Douglas-fir forests at the elevation between 915 and 1,650 meters is the preferred habitat of the squirrels. Original vegetation in the habitat of the NIDGS was big sage brush, bitterbrush, native bunch grasses, and forbs, but now the area is dominated by cheatgrass and medusahead.

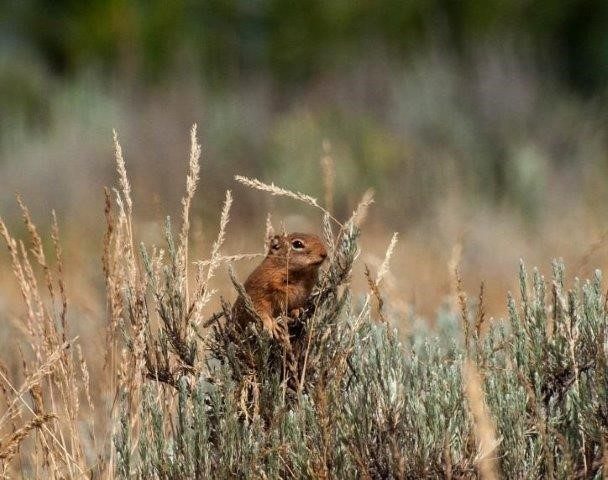

During the winter, the NIDGS hibernates in environments with larger coverage compared to the active season habitats. The NIDGS mainly hibernates at a completely different habitat than the active season habitat.

The northern Idaho ground squirrel lives in the Adams and Valley Counties in western-central Idaho. The species used to occupy 1,600 km^{2}, but now the species only occupies less than 20 km^{2}. The species is sub-divided into small, isolated populations that survive on isolated islands of suitable but unconnected habitat patches. These populations contain less than 100 individuals, and often less than 20. There are significant genetic differences among populations, due to genetic drift reinforced by lack of genetic interchange (inter-population dispersal) resulting from habitat fragmentation.

Predators of the northern Idaho ground squirrel include prairie falcons, Cooper's hawks, goshawks, red-tailed hawks, northern harriers, badgers, coyotes, and long-tailed weasels. The species only has one alarm call for predators, which is given mostly by females when their young leave the natal burrow.

== Conservation ==
=== Threats ===
The main cause for the decreasing population of the species is habitat loss. In pre-settlement times, these ground squirrels lived in ponderosa pine forests containing meadow terrain. The Native Americans set fires to these forests, which introduced more open terrain in the forests for the squirrels to roam and allowed young trees to infill the meadows they inhabit. In 1910, a movement for fire suppression stopped these fires. Consistent logging efforts in the habitats of northern Idaho ground squirrels have caused the forests to grow back thicker, leaving no open space for the species. Habitat conversion into thicker and wetter environments has also made many original habitats unfit for the squirrels Cattle and sheep grazing have mixed effects on populations. On the one hand, the diets of cattle and northern Idaho ground squirrel hardly overlap because cattle prefer grasses these ground squirrels prefer forbs. On the other hand, grazing reduces grass seed availability because cattle often consume grasses before they produce seeds and northern Idaho ground squirrels rely heavily on seeds late in the season to fuel their metabolism during hibernation, the time of major mortality. Another reason for the decreasing population of northern Idaho ground squirrels is purposeful killing. From 1933 to 1942, the Payette National Forest poisoned the squirrels because of an untrue assumption that they damaged trees. From 1930 to 1980, farmers poisoned many of squirrels in west-central Idaho for "pest control."

=== Status ===
In 2000, the northern Idaho ground squirrel was classified as threatened under the Endangered Species Act. The most recent numbers from the Idaho Department of Fish and Game suggest the total population of the species is about 2000 individuals. As the population continues to decline, the increased likelihood of inbreeding and decrease in genetic diversity continues to lead the northern Idaho ground squirrel into extinction.

=== Efforts ===
The most recommended option for conserving the northern Idaho ground squirrel is habitat restoration. Since the species utilize two different habitats (one for hibernating in the winter and one for summer), the most effective conservation would be to restore both types of habitats.

Many NIDGS populations have disappeared in recent years, due especially to loss of habitat and reductions in seed availability, resulting in inadequate pre-hibernation nutrition and starvation overwinter. The U.S. Fish & Wildlife Service put a recovery plan for the northern Idaho ground squirrel in place in 2003. The plan seeks to increase population size and create more metapopulations and care for them until they are self sufficient. For the plan to end, the effective population must increase to over 5,000 individuals. The plan is also using a captive breeding program, in case the effort to increase the wild populations fails.

In August 2022, there was a 5-year review published by the U.S. Fish and Wildlife Service to assess the recovery plan and the species. Research on forest restoration for the squirrel is expected to be done by 2027. Forest thinning followed by prescribed fire and prescribed fire are begin used to restore the NIDGS habitat. 32 acres of land in the Payette National Forest received prescribed fire for the NIDGS habitat. The OX Ranch, near Cuprum, Idaho, signed a Safe Harbor Agreement to support one of the largest populations of the NIDGS with 7,783 acres of land (the ranch has been a crucial part of conservation). The squirrel is still a threatened species.
