= Francois Payette =

François Payette (c. 1793 – post 1844) was a North American fur trader. Born near Montreal, he began his career as a canoeman, was hired by John Jacob Astor and shipped to the Oregon Country aboard the Tonquin, entering the mouth of the Columbia River on May 9, 1812. With the sale of Astor's Pacific Fur Company to the North West Company in 1813, Payette joined the NWC, "accompanying numerous expeditions into the interior." When the Hudson's Bay Company absorbed the North West Company in 1821, Payette transferred allegiance to the HBC. He took part in notable fur gathering-trading expeditions throughout the upper Rockies and was an occasional interpreter, sometimes second in command of brigades, and clerk.

He was stationed at old Fort Boise (near present-day Parma) for his last years with the company, retiring June 1, 1844. While in the Northwest, Payette had at least one child by a Flathead woman. The child was named Baptiste who spent the winter of 1833–1834 studying in Boston.

After this, there are two known stories. The first is that he returned to Montreal, and nothing more is known of him. The second is the account of George Goodhart, who claims he died in Idaho, either in 1854 or 1855 and was buried in the area now known as Washoe, looking over the Snake and Payette rivers.

Payette was one of the able and worthy HBC men in the interior Northwest. In southwestern Idaho, a river, lake, county, city, and a national forest are named for him.

Former astronaut Julie Payette of Canada claimed him to be an ancestor, during her inaugural speech as Governor General of Canada on October 2, 2017.
