= Payette, Idaho =

- City
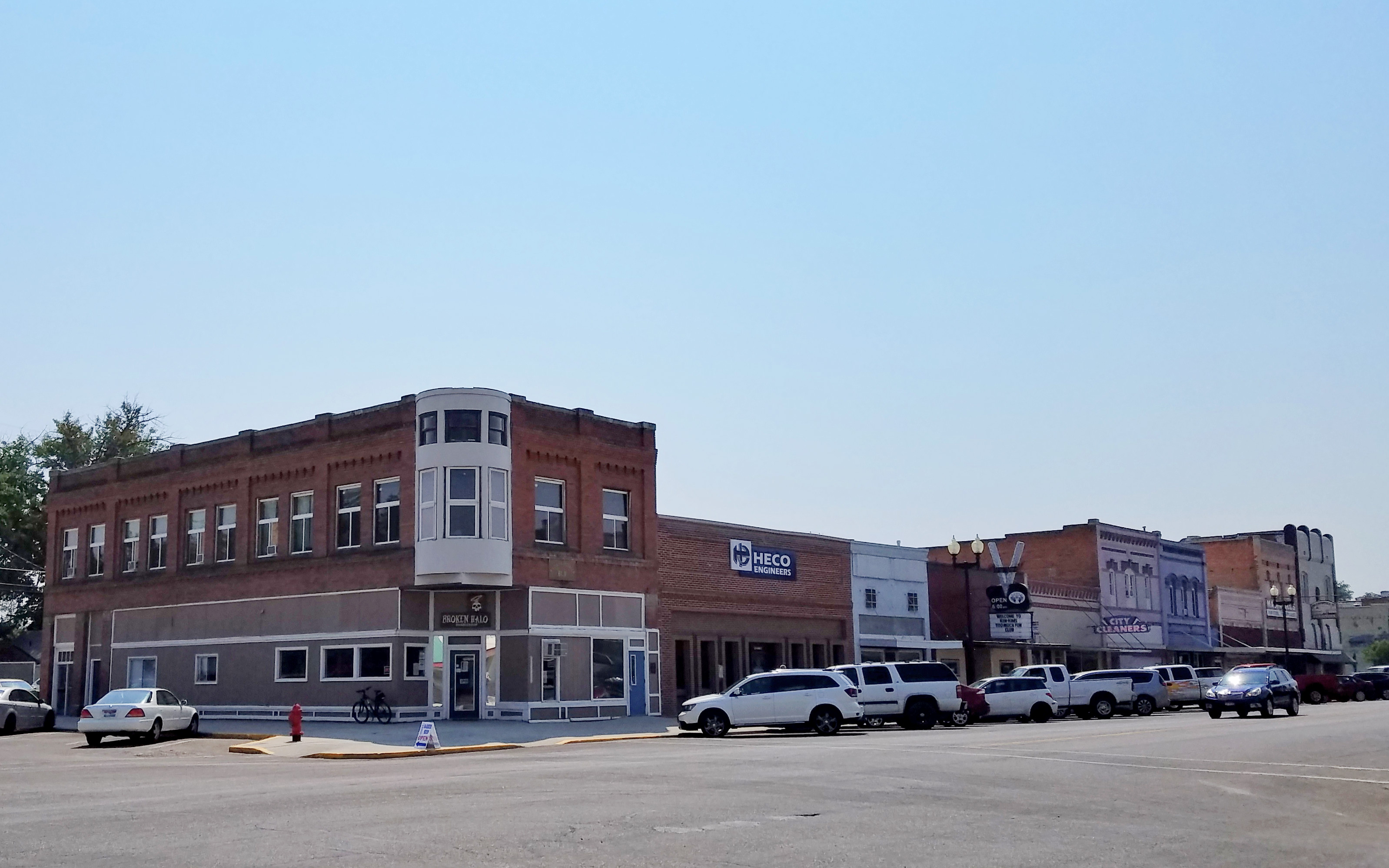
- Payette, Idaho, Main Street seen toward the N. A. Jacobsen building.

- Location of Payette in Payette County, Idaho.
- Coordinates: 44°04′44″N 116°55′31″W
- Country: United States
- State: Idaho
- County: Payette

Area
  - Total: 4.02 sq mi (10.41 km^{2})
  - Land: 3.98 sq mi (10.31 km^{2})
  - Water: 0.039 sq mi (0.10 km^{2})
- Elevation: 2,159 ft (658 m)

Population (2020)
  - Total: 8,127
  - Density: 1,941.3/sq mi (749.54/km^{2})
- Time zone: UTC-7 (Mountain (MST))
  - Summer (DST): UTC-6 (MDT)
- ZIP code: 83661
- Area codes: 208, 986
- FIPS code: 16-61300
- GNIS feature ID: 2411390
- Website: cityofpayette.com

Payette is a city in and the county seat of Payette County, Idaho, United States. As of the 2020 census, Payette had a population of 8,127. It is part of the Ontario, OR−ID Micropolitan Statistical Area.

== History ==
The settlement was originally named "Boomerang," a construction camp for the Oregon Short Line from 1882 to 1884 at the mouth of the Payette River. Logs were floated down the river to the sawmills at the camp to produce railroad ties. After completion of the railroad, the settlement moved upstream to its present site and incorporated in 1891 as "Payette," to honor François Payette, a French-Canadian fur trapper and one of the first white men to explore the area. He had arrived in present-day Idaho from Astoria and was later the head of the Fort Boise trading post for the British Hudson's Bay Company from 1835 to 1844. A large merry man, Payette was highly regarded for his helpful assistance to the many travelers who came through the fort. Following his retirement in 1844, he returned to Montreal, after which the rest of his life is a mystery.

Payette County was created in 1917, partitioned from Canyon County, and the city of Payette became the county seat.

== Geography ==
According to the United States Census Bureau, the city has a total area of 3.86 square miles (10.00 km^{2}), of which 3.85 square miles (9.97 km^{2}) is land and 0.01 square miles (0.03 km^{2}) is water.

== Highways ==
- - US 95
- - SH-52

== Demographics ==
Historical population
Census	Pop.	Note	%±
1900	614		—
1910	1,948		217.3%
1920	2,433		24.9%
1930	2,618		7.6%
1940	3,322		26.9%
1950	4,032		21.4%
1960	4,451		10.4%
1970	4,521		1.6%
1980	5,448		20.5%
1990	5,592		2.6%
2000	7,054		26.1%
2010	7,433		5.4%
2020	8,127		9.3%
2023 (est.)	8,636		6.3%
U.S. Decennial Census

=== 2020 census ===
Note: the US Census treats Hispanic/Latino as an ethnic category. This table excludes Latinos from the racial categories and assigns them to a separate category. Hispanics/Latinos can be of any race.

Payette racial composition (NH = Non-Hispanic)
Race	Number	Percentage
White (NH)	5,750	70.75%
Black or African American (NH)	21	0.26%
Native American or Alaska Native (NH)	66	0.81%
Asian (NH)	49	0.6%
Pacific Islander (NH)	14	0.17%
Some Other Race (NH)	35	0.43%
Mixed/Multi-Racial (NH)	453	5.57%
Hispanic or Latino	1,739	21.4%
Total	8,127	

As of the 2020 census, there were 8,127 people, 3,093 households, and 3,081 families residing in the city.

The median age was 38.6 years. 25.1% of residents were under the age of 18 and 20.2% were 65 years of age or older. For every 100 females there were 98.3 males, and for every 100 females age 18 and over there were 95.3 males age 18 and over.

98.3% of residents lived in urban areas, while 1.7% lived in rural areas.

Of the 3,093 households, 32.2% had children under the age of 18 living in them. Of all households, 46.3% were married-couple households, 18.9% were households with a male householder and no spouse or partner present, and 26.9% were households with a female householder and no spouse or partner present. About 27.3% of all households were made up of individuals, and 12.6% had someone living alone who was 65 years of age or older.

There were 3,249 housing units, of which 4.8% were vacant. The homeowner vacancy rate was 1.0% and the rental vacancy rate was 3.8%.

=== 2010 census ===
As of the census of 2010, there were 7,433 people, 2,816 households, and 1,910 families living in the city. The population density was 1,930.6 inhabitants per square mile (745.4/km^{2}). There were 3,095 housing units at an average density of 803.9 per square mile (310.4/km^{2}). The racial makeup of the city was 86.6% White, 0.2% African American, 1.5% Native American, 0.8% Asian, 7.3% from other races, and 3.5% from two or more races. Hispanic or Latino of any race were 19.3% of the population.

There were 2,816 households, of which 36.7% had children under the age of 18 living with them, 48.2% were married couples living together, 13.6% had a female householder with no husband present, 6.0% had a male householder with no wife present, and 32.2% were non-families. 26.4% of all households were made up of individuals, and 12.3% had someone living alone who was 65 years of age or older. The average household size was 2.61 and the average family size was 3.12.

The median age in the city was 35 years. 28% of residents were under the age of 18; 9.5% were between the ages of 18 and 24; 24.5% were from 25 to 44; 22.5% were from 45 to 64; and 15.6% were 65 years of age or older. The gender makeup of the city was 48.9% male and 51.1% female.

=== 2000 census ===
As of the census of 2000, there were 7,054 people, 2,619 households, and 1,841 families living in the city. The population density was 2,087.2 inhabitants per square mile (805.9/km^{2}). There were 2,834 housing units at an average density of 838.6 per square mile (323.8/km^{2}). The racial makeup of the city was 87.43% White, 0.09% African American, 1.15% Native American, 0.86% Asian, 0.03% Pacific Islander, 7.67% from other races, and 2.78% from two or more races. Hispanic or Latino of any race were 15.78% of the population.

There were 2,619 households, out of which 37.0% had children under the age of 18 living with them, 54.4% were married couples living together, 11.3% had a female householder with no husband present, and 29.7% were non-families. 25.8% of all households were made up of individuals, and 11.1% had someone living alone who was 65 years of age or older. The average household size was 2.66 and the average family size was 3.20.

In the city, the population was spread out, with 30.7% under the age of 18, 9.0% from 18 to 24, 27.2% from 25 to 44, 19.2% from 45 to 64, and 13.9% who were 65 years of age or older. The median age was 32 years. For every 100 females, there were 94.7 males. For every 100 females age 18 and over, there were 91.4 males.

The median income for a household in the city was $29,375, and the median income for a family was $36,944. Males had a median income of $28,762 versus $19,781 for females. The per capita income for the city was $13,826. About 11.4% of families and 15.2% of the population were below the poverty line, including 18.0% of those under age 18 and 12.3% of those age 65 or over.

== Climate ==
Payette experiences a semi-arid climate (Köppen BSk) with cold, moist winters and hot, dry summers. A weather station in nearby Ontario, Oregon has been in operation since 1903.

Climate data for Payette, Idaho, 1991–2020 normals, extremes 1892–present
Month	Jan	Feb	Mar	Apr	May	Jun	Jul	Aug	Sep	Oct	Nov	Dec	Year
Record high °F (°C)	66 (19)	74 (23)	83 (28)	95 (35)	100 (38)	107 (42)	111 (44)	110 (43)	102 (39)	96 (36)	78 (26)	67 (19)	111 (44)
Mean maximum °F (°C)	53.1 (11.7)	60.3 (15.7)	71.0 (21.7)	80.6 (27.0)	89.9 (32.2)	96.4 (35.8)	102.6 (39.2)	100.5 (38.1)	93.5 (34.2)	82.3 (27.9)	65.9 (18.8)	55.0 (12.8)	103.0 (39.4)
Mean daily maximum °F (°C)	39.1 (3.9)	47.8 (8.8)	58.1 (14.5)	65.1 (18.4)	73.9 (23.3)	81.1 (27.3)	91.8 (33.2)	90.3 (32.4)	80.3 (26.8)	67.1 (19.5)	51.5 (10.8)	40.0 (4.4)	65.5 (18.6)
Daily mean °F (°C)	31.5 (−0.3)	37.7 (3.2)	46.1 (7.8)	52.1 (11.2)	60.8 (16.0)	67.7 (19.8)	76.4 (24.7)	74.5 (23.6)	65.2 (18.4)	53.1 (11.7)	40.9 (4.9)	32.2 (0.1)	53.2 (11.8)
Mean daily minimum °F (°C)	24.0 (−4.4)	27.6 (−2.4)	34.0 (1.1)	39.1 (3.9)	47.7 (8.7)	54.3 (12.4)	61.1 (16.2)	58.8 (14.9)	50.1 (10.1)	39.0 (3.9)	30.3 (−0.9)	24.4 (−4.2)	40.9 (4.9)
Mean minimum °F (°C)	7.6 (−13.6)	14.4 (−9.8)	21.6 (−5.8)	26.8 (−2.9)	33.5 (0.8)	42.6 (5.9)	51.1 (10.6)	48.2 (9.0)	38.2 (3.4)	25.9 (−3.4)	15.8 (−9.0)	10.0 (−12.2)	2.8 (−16.2)
Record low °F (°C)	−26 (−32)	−23 (−31)	−5 (−21)	16 (−9)	21 (−6)	27 (−3)	36 (2)	32 (0)	23 (−5)	11 (−12)	−2 (−19)	−33 (−36)	−33 (−36)
Average precipitation inches (mm)	1.42 (36)	1.07 (27)	0.97 (25)	0.82 (21)	1.29 (33)	0.82 (21)	0.36 (9.1)	0.24 (6.1)	0.85 (22)	0.63 (16)	1.03 (26)	1.75 (44)	11.25 (286.2)
Average snowfall inches (cm)	2.1 (5.3)	1.5 (3.8)	0.2 (0.51)	0.0 (0.0)	0.0 (0.0)	0.0 (0.0)	0.0 (0.0)	0.0 (0.0)	0.0 (0.0)	0.0 (0.0)	0.4 (1.0)	8.0 (20)	12.2 (30.61)
Average precipitation days (≥ 0.01 in)	9.9	7.4	8.5	8.2	6.9	5.0	2.0	1.6	2.1	4.6	9.0	10.3	75.5
Average snowy days (≥ 0.1 in)	2.7	1.2	0.2	0.0	0.0	0.0	0.0	0.0	0.0	0.0	0.4	3.1	7.6
Source 1: NOAA (snow/snow days 1981–2010)
Source 2: National Weather Service

== Education ==
The school district is Payette Joint School District 371. Payette High School is the district's comprehensive high school.

== Notable people ==
- Diane Anderson-Minshall, journalist
- A. L. Freehafer, Idaho state representative
- William Norman Grigg, author
- Michael Hoffman, film director
- Donna M. Jones, Idaho state controller
- Harmon Killebrew, member of the Baseball Hall of Fame
- Jim McClure, U.S. senator from Idaho
- Rick Rydell, radio host and author
- Herman Welker, U.S. senator from Idaho
- Sting Ray Robb, IndyCar driver
