= Idaho ground squirrel =

The Idaho ground squirrel has been split into the following species:

- Northern Idaho ground squirrel, Urocitellus brunneus
- Southern Idaho ground squirrel, Urocitellus endemicus
