= New Plymouth High School =

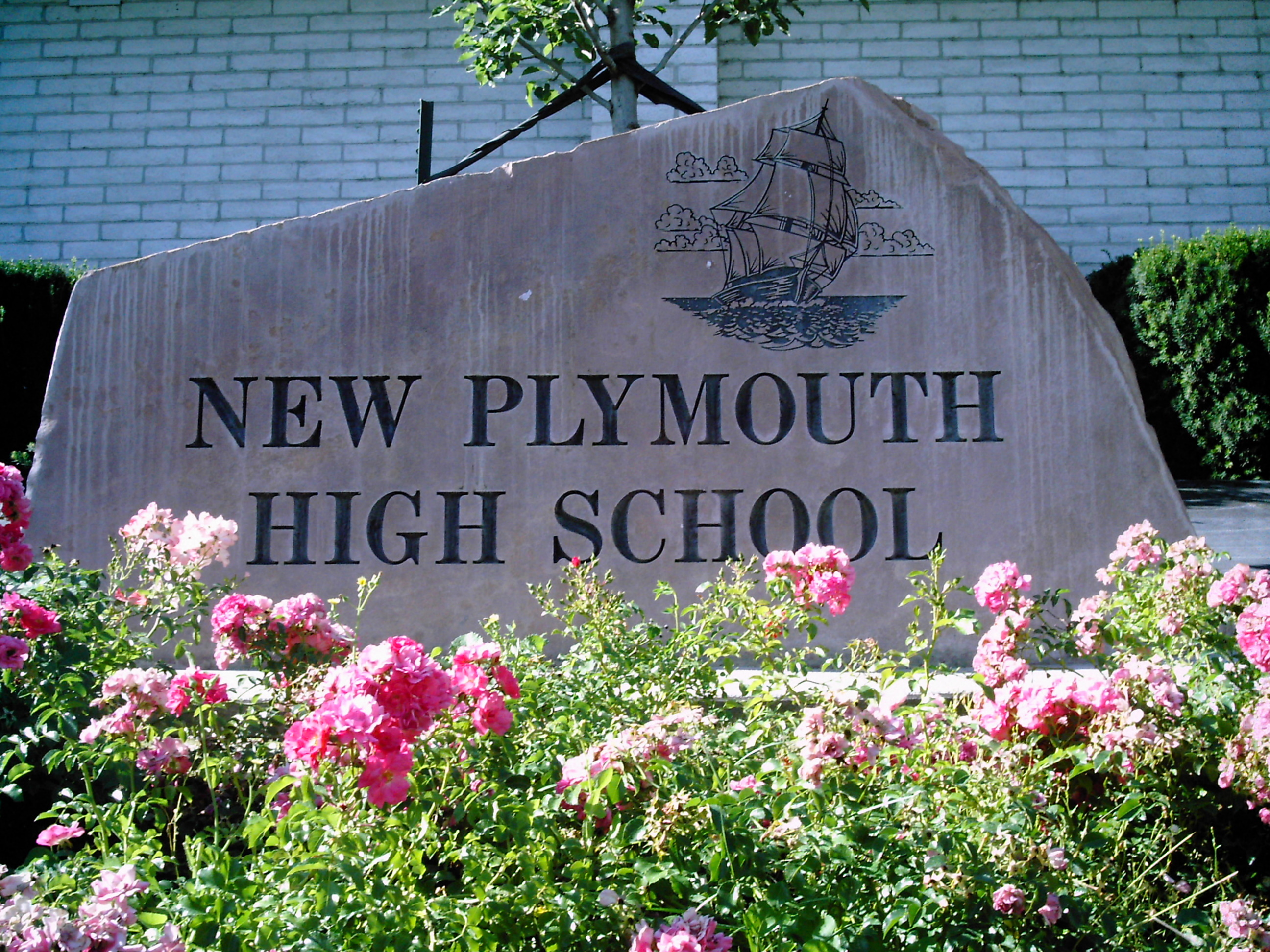

Location
- 207 South Plymouth Avenue; New Plymouth, Idaho 83655; United States
- Coordinates: 43°58′09″N 116°49′08″W

Information
- Type: Public
- School district: New Plymouth School District
- Faculty: 16.00 (FTE)
- Grades: 9-12
- Enrollment: 290 (2023-2024)
- Student to teacher ratio: 18.12
- Colors: Navy blue, white
- Athletics conference: IHSAA Western 2A
- Nickname: Pilgrims
- Newspaper: The Pilgrim Press
- Website: nphs.npschools.us

New Plymouth High School is the high school of New Plymouth, Idaho. It was built in 1986 after the previous high school building burned down in a fire on December 18, 1984. Originally, it was designed as a junior-senior high school, housing grades seven through twelve. In 1996, the city of New Plymouth approved a school bond and built New Plymouth Middle School in order to relieve crowding in the high school and New Plymouth Elementary School by housing grades six through eight.

The previous school was built in 1938, and was always used as a junior and senior high school. During the interim while the new school was being constructed, students held classes at local churches and government buildings, such as the New Plymouth Congregational Church and the New Plymouth Public Library.

== Sports ==
New Plymouth High School sports teams include baseball, girls' basketball and boys' basketball, cross country, football, softball, track & field, volleyball, and wrestling.
