= Payette County, Idaho =

County in Idaho, United States

- County
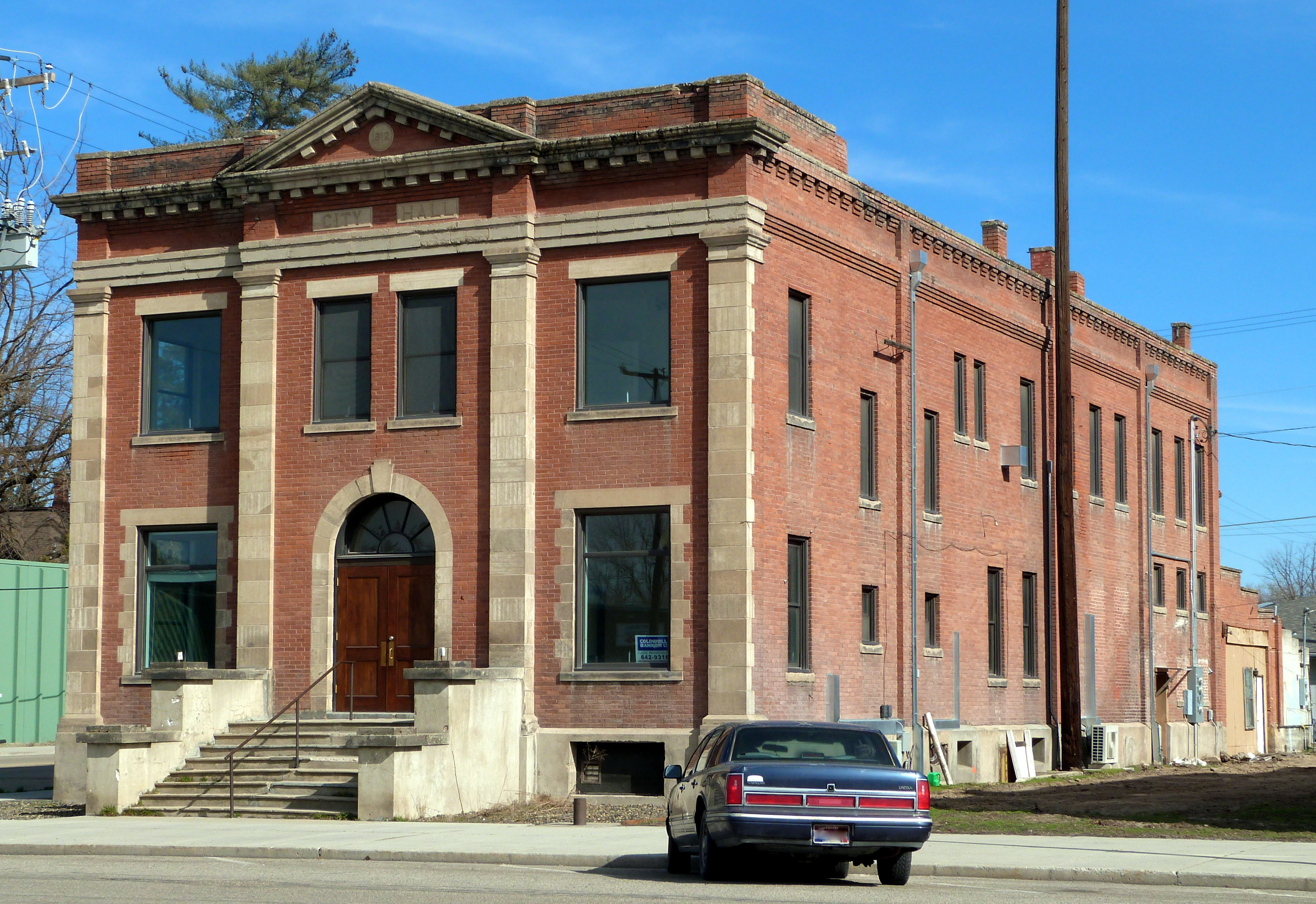
- Historic Payette City Hall and Courthouse

- Seal

- Location within the U.S. state of Idaho
- Coordinates: 44°01′N 116°46′W
- Country: United States
- State: Idaho
- Founded: February 28, 1917
- Named for: Francois Payette
- Seat: Payette
- Largest city: Payette

Area
  - Total: 410 sq mi (1,100 km^{2})
  - Land: 407 sq mi (1,050 km^{2})
  - Water: 3.4 sq mi (8.8 km^{2}) 0.65%

Population (2020)
  - Total: 25,386
  - Estimate (2025): 27,824 ▲
  - Density: 62.4/sq mi (24.1/km^{2})
- Time zone: UTC−7 (Mountain)
  - Summer (DST): UTC−6 (MDT)
- Congressional district: 1st
- Website: www.payettecounty.org

Payette County is a county located in Idaho, United States. As of the 2020 census, the population was 25,386. The county seat and largest city is Payette.

Payette County is part of the Ontario micropolitan area.

== History ==
The county was established in 1917, partitioned from Canyon County. It was named after the Payette River, which was named after French-Canadian François Payette. Originally a fur trapper with the North West Company, Payette was the first white man in the area in 1818.

Payette County is one of the few counties in Idaho to be the home to the endangered Idaho ground squirrel.

== Geography ==
According to the U.S. Census Bureau, the county has a total area of 410 square miles (1,100 km^{2}), of which 407 square miles (1,050 km^{2}) is land and 3.4 square miles (8.8 km^{2}) (0.8%) is water. It is the smallest county in Idaho by area.

=== Adjacent counties ===
- Washington County - north
- Gem County - east
- Canyon County - south
- Malheur County, Oregon - west

=== National protected area ===
- Deer Flat National Wildlife Refuge (part)

=== Rivers ===
- Snake River
- Payette River

=== Highways ===
- I 84
- US 30
- US 95
- SH-52
- SH-72

== Demographics ==
Historical population
Census	Pop.	Note	%±
1920	7,021		—
1930	7,318		4.2%
1940	9,511		30.0%
1950	11,921		25.3%
1960	12,363		3.7%
1970	12,401		0.3%
1980	15,722		26.8%
1990	16,434		4.5%
2000	20,578		25.2%
2010	22,623		9.9%
2020	25,386		12.2%
2025 (est.)	27,824	▲	9.6%
U.S. Decennial Census; 1790–1960, 1900–1990, 1990–2000, 2010,

=== Racial and ethnic composition ===
Payette County, Idaho – Racial and ethnic composition Note: the US Census treats Hispanic/Latino as an ethnic category. This table excludes Latinos from the racial categories and assigns them to a separate category. Hispanics/Latinos may be of any race.
Race / Ethnicity (NH = Non-Hispanic)	Pop 1980	Pop 1990	Pop 2000	Pop 2010	Pop 2020	% 1980	% 1990	% 2000	% 2010	% 2020
White alone (NH)	14,716	14,884	17,434	18,388	19,240	93.60%	90.57%	84.72%	81.28%	75.79%
Black or African American alone (NH)	4	11	19	41	52	0.03%	0.07%	0.09%	0.18%	0.20%
Native American or Alaska Native alone (NH)	96	175	132	185	163	0.61%	1.06%	0.64%	0.82%	0.64%
Asian alone (NH)	186	157	169	187	207	1.18%	0.96%	0.82%	0.83%	0.82%
Native Hawaiian or Pacific Islander alone (NH)	x	x	6	15	31	x	x	0.03%	0.07%	0.12%
Other race alone (NH)	41	7	23	15	133	0.26%	0.04%	0.11%	0.07%	0.52%
Mixed race or Multiracial (NH)	x	x	342	429	1,292	x	x	1.66%	1.90%	5.09%
Hispanic or Latino (any race)	679	1,200	2,453	3,363	4,268	4.32%	7.30%	11.92%	14.87%	16.81%
Total	15,722	16,434	20,578	22,623	25,386	100.00%	100.00%	100.00%	100.00%	100.00%

=== 2020 census ===
As of the 2020 census, there were 25,386 people, 9,223 households, and 6,275 families residing in the county. The median age was 39.4 years, with 26.5% of residents under the age of 18 and 19.6% 65 years of age or older. For every 100 females there were 100.0 males, and for every 100 females age 18 and over there were 96.6 males age 18 and over.

The racial makeup of the county was 80.5% White, 0.3% Black or African American, 1.3% American Indian and Alaska Native, 0.9% Asian, 0.1% Native Hawaiian and Pacific Islander, 6.6% from some other race, and 10.4% from two or more races. Hispanic or Latino residents of any race comprised 16.8% of the population.

58.8% of residents lived in urban areas, while 41.2% lived in rural areas.

Of the 9,223 households, 33.8% had children under the age of 18 living with them and 22.0% had a female householder with no spouse or partner present. About 23.0% of all households were made up of individuals and 11.9% had someone living alone who was 65 years of age or older.

There were 9,684 housing units, of which 4.8% were vacant. Among occupied housing units, 74.1% were owner-occupied and 25.9% were renter-occupied. The homeowner vacancy rate was 1.1% and the rental vacancy rate was 3.9%.

=== 2010 census ===
As of the 2010 United States census, there were 22,623 people, 8,262 households, and 6,017 families living in the county. The population density was 55.6 inhabitants per square mile (21.5/km^{2}). There were 8,945 housing units at an average density of 22.0 per square mile (8.5/km^{2}). The racial makeup of the county was 88.6% white, 1.1% American Indian, 0.8% Asian, 0.2% black or African American, 0.1% Pacific islander, 6.3% from other races, and 2.8% from two or more races. Those of Hispanic or Latino origin made up 14.9% of the population. In terms of ancestry, 18.9% were American, 16.8% were German, 13.2% were English, and 10.5% were Irish.

Of the 8,262 households, 37.2% had children under the age of 18 living with them, 57.4% were married couples living together, 10.4% had a female householder with no husband present, 27.2% were non-families, and 22.1% of all households were made up of individuals. The average household size was 2.73 and the average family size was 3.19. The median age was 37.2 years.

The median income for a household in the county was $43,559 and the median income for a family was $50,323. Males had a median income of $38,582 versus $25,826 for females. The per capita income for the county was $18,814. About 12.0% of families and 15.7% of the population were below the poverty line, including 22.6% of those under age 18 and 9.3% of those age 65 or over.

=== 2000 census ===
As of the census of 2000, there were 20,578 people, 7,371 households, and 5,572 families living in the county. The population density was 50 inhabitants per square mile (19/km^{2}). There were 7,949 housing units at an average density of 20 per square mile (7.7/km^{2}). The racial makeup of the county was 90.25% White, 0.87% Native American, 0.85% Asian, 0.10% Black or African American, 0.03% Pacific Islander, 5.57% from other races, and 2.33% from two or more races. 11.92% of the population were Hispanic or Latino of any race. 19.5% were of German, 13.5% English, 12.3% American and 8.3% Irish ancestry.

There were 7,371 households, out of which 37.70% had children under the age of 18 living with them, 62.00% were married couples living together, 9.30% had a female householder with no husband present, and 24.40% were non-families. 20.60% of all households were made up of individuals, and 9.50% had someone living alone who was 65 years of age or older. The average household size was 2.78 and the average family size was 3.21.

In the county, the population was spread out, with 30.60% under the age of 18, 7.90% from 18 to 24, 26.60% from 25 to 44, 21.70% from 45 to 64, and 13.20% who were 65 years of age or older. The median age was 34 years. For every 100 females, there were 98.30 males. For every 100 females age 18 and over, there were 94.80 males.

The median income for a household in the county was $33,046, and the median income for a family was $37,430. Males had a median income of $30,641 versus $21,421 for females. The per capita income for the county was $14,924. About 9.70% of families and 13.20% of the population were below the poverty line, including 16.70% of those under age 18 and 12.20% of those age 65 or over.

== Education ==
The county is served by three school districts:

- Fruitland School District 373
- New Plymouth School District 372
- Payette Joint School District 371

Payette Joint District 371

- Payette High School
- McCain Middle School
- Payette Primary School
- Westside Elementary School
- Payette Night School

New Plymouth District 372

- New Plymouth High School
- New Plymouth Middle School
- New Plymouth Elementary School

Fruitland District 373

- Fruitland High School
- Fruitland Middle School
- Fruitland Elementary School
- Fruitland Alternative School

Residents are in the area (but not the taxation zone) for College of Western Idaho.

== Communities ==
=== Cities ===
- Fruitland
- New Plymouth
- Payette

=== Unincorporated community ===
- Hamilton Corner

== Politics ==
Like most of Idaho, Payette County voters are overwhelmingly Republican. In no presidential election since 1936 has the county selected the Democratic candidate, and Jimmy Carter in 1976 was the last Democrat to crack one third of the county's vote.

United States presidential election results for Payette County, Idaho
Year	Republican		Democratic		Third party(ies)	
Year	No.	%	No.	%	No.	%
1920	1,690	68.04%	785	31.60%	9	0.36%
1924	1,160	47.39%	401	16.38%	887	36.23%
1928	2,203	76.23%	621	21.49%	66	2.28%
1932	1,529	42.63%	1,836	51.18%	222	6.19%
1936	1,524	41.61%	1,677	45.78%	462	12.61%
1940	2,554	58.52%	1,790	41.02%	20	0.46%
1944	2,485	63.96%	1,382	35.57%	18	0.46%
1948	2,430	59.54%	1,568	38.42%	83	2.03%
1952	3,936	72.37%	1,491	27.41%	12	0.22%
1956	3,342	65.41%	1,767	34.59%	0	0.00%
1960	3,472	61.94%	2,133	38.06%	0	0.00%
1964	2,764	52.43%	2,508	47.57%	0	0.00%
1968	3,032	61.18%	1,216	24.54%	708	14.29%
1972	3,577	67.85%	1,113	21.11%	582	11.04%
1976	3,115	57.44%	2,195	40.48%	113	2.08%
1980	4,508	67.14%	1,828	27.23%	378	5.63%
1984	4,605	75.23%	1,410	23.04%	106	1.73%
1988	3,786	65.17%	1,900	32.71%	123	2.12%
1992	2,895	42.92%	1,656	24.55%	2,194	32.53%
1996	3,901	55.59%	2,119	30.19%	998	14.22%
2000	4,961	72.34%	1,643	23.96%	254	3.70%
2004	6,256	76.47%	1,848	22.59%	77	0.94%
2008	5,988	68.88%	2,415	27.78%	290	3.34%
2012	6,004	70.68%	2,271	26.73%	220	2.59%
2016	6,489	74.55%	1,507	17.31%	708	8.13%
2020	8,862	78.47%	2,161	19.14%	270	2.39%
2024	9,458	80.42%	2,064	17.55%	239	2.03%

== Healthcare ==
The county is served by the Southwest Idaho Health District.

== See also ==
- National Register of Historic Places listings in Payette County, Idaho
