= New Plymouth, Idaho =

- City
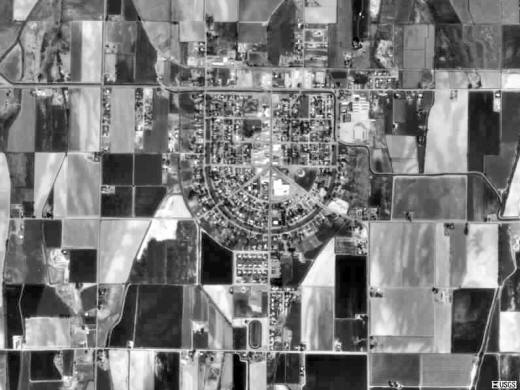
- Aerial view of New Plymouth
- Nickname: World's Largest Horseshoe
- Location of New Plymouth in Payette County, Idaho.
- Coordinates: 43°58′14″N 116°49′08″W
- Country: United States
- State: Idaho
- County: Payette
- Incorporated: 1896

Area
  - Total: 0.69 sq mi (1.78 km^{2})
  - Land: 0.69 sq mi (1.78 km^{2})
  - Water: 0 sq mi (0.00 km^{2})
- Elevation: 2,257 ft (688 m)

Population (2020)
  - Total: 1,494
  - Density: 2,260.1/sq mi (872.62/km^{2})
- Time zone: UTC-7 (Mountain (MST))
  - Summer (DST): UTC-6 (MDT)
- ZIP code: 83655
- Area codes: 208, 986
- FIPS code: 16-56980
- GNIS feature ID: 2411235
- Website: www.npidaho.com

New Plymouth is a city in Payette County, Idaho. As of the 2020 census, New Plymouth had a population of 1,494. It was incorporated on February 15, 1896. It is the host of the annual Payette County Fair and rodeo.

New Plymouth is part of the Ontario, OR–ID Micropolitan Statistical Area.

== History ==
New Plymouth was a colony town, bought and planned before it was settled. It was the combined project of a group of people purportedly dissatisfied with city life in Chicago, who in 1895 formed what they called "The Plymouth Society of Chicago" and William E. Smythe, who was the chairman of the executive committee of the National Irrigation Congress and a famous irrigation promoter. Mr. Smythe was determined to found a colony to serve as a striking argument in favor of his project - irrigation. He spoke throughout the east, urging young and old men to go west in colonies and develop the country with the help of irrigation. He wanted the first colony to be called New Plymouth — after Plymouth, Massachusetts — and wanted it located in southwestern Idaho in the Payette Valley, which he had found apt for his purpose because of the extraordinary water supply via the nearby Payette River.

The Plymouth Society of Chicago selected a committee to investigate the irrigated Payette River Valley in the five-year-old state of Idaho, and another site in Colorado, to be purchased for the colony. The present city of New Plymouth was on the drawing boards in Chicago, designed as a town able to be self-reliant through the use of irrigation, solidly built on an agricultural and railroad economy.

In February 1896, each colonist purchased 20 shares of stock at $30 per share, which entitled him to 20 acres (81,000 m^{2}) of land and a town lot. He was to clear the land of sagebrush and plant fruit trees, preferably apples. The town was platted with a horseshoe shape with its open end facing to the north, toward the railroad and the river. This area was planned as an industrial zone, and the acre tracts around the horseshoe were the residential lots.

The homes were to be built on the street side and the balance of the acre for garden and pasture for the family cow and the driving team. Two streets, separated by an 80-foot (24 m) park, curve around the town in a horseshoe shape. This mile-long (1.6 km) park and the streets that enclose it were called "The Boulevard." The park was planted with grass and shade trees. Plymouth Avenue, the main street and principal business thoroughfare, was surveyed (16 feet off the section line) down the center of the horseshoe from the railroad on the north through the Boulevard on the south.

The community was at first called the New Plymouth Farm Village and was governed by a colony board of directors until it incorporated as a village in 1908, dropping the last two words in the name.

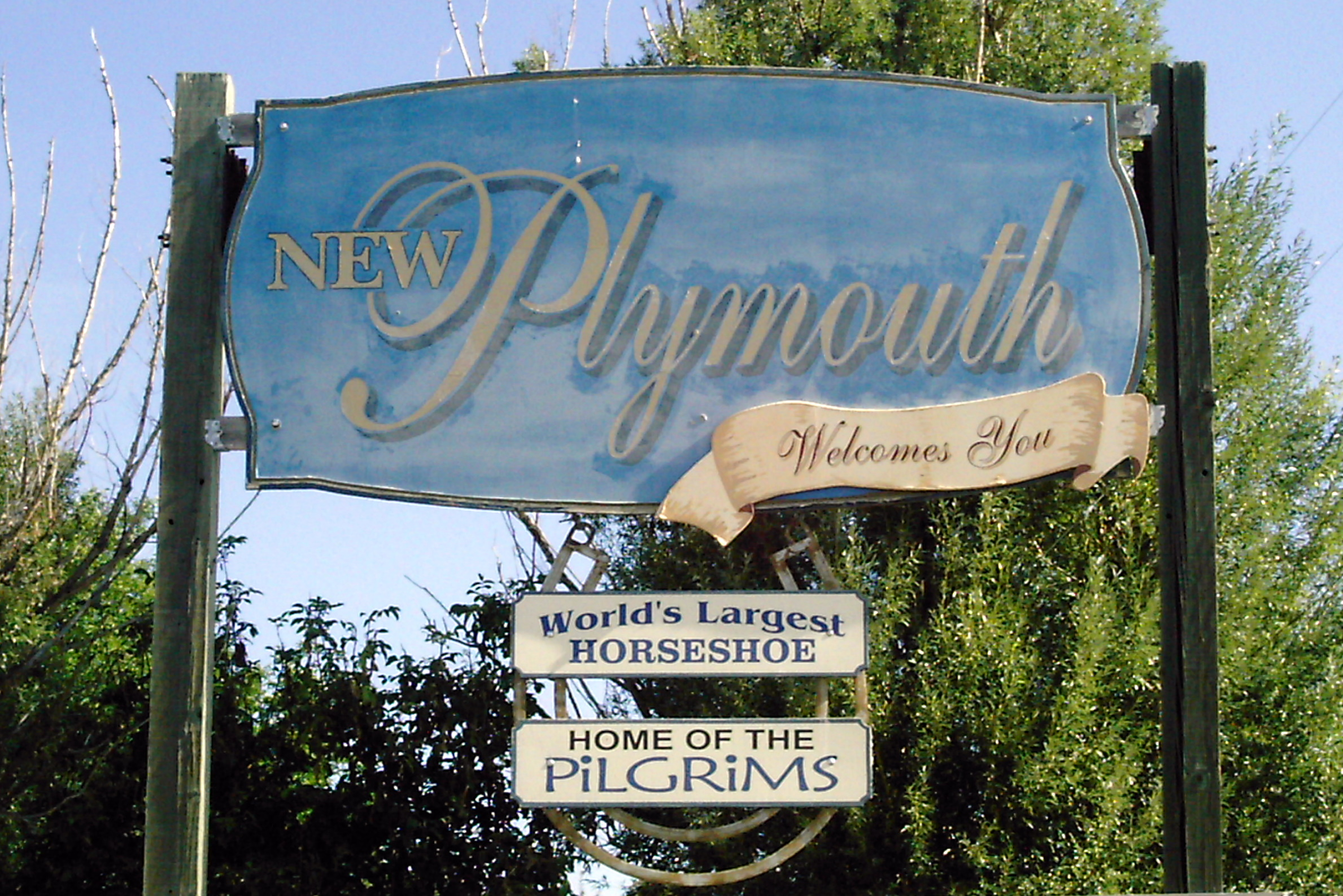
Sign that welcomes you into New Plymouth coming from the south.

== Geography ==
According to the United States Census Bureau, the city has a total area of 0.69 square miles (1.79 km^{2}), all of it land.

== Demographics ==
Historical population
Census	Pop.	Note	%±
1910	274		—
1920	400		46.0%
1930	510		27.5%
1940	804		57.6%
1950	942		17.2%
1960	940		−0.2%
1970	986		4.9%
1980	1,186		20.3%
1990	1,313		10.7%
2000	1,400		6.6%
2010	1,538		9.9%
2020	1,494		−2.9%
2019 (est.)	1,554		1.0%
U.S. Decennial Census

=== 2020 census ===
As of the 2020 census, New Plymouth had a population of 1,494. The median age was 36.9 years. 27.6% of residents were under the age of 18 and 18.1% of residents were 65 years of age or older. For every 100 females there were 104.4 males, and for every 100 females age 18 and over there were 96.0 males age 18 and over.

0.0% of residents lived in urban areas, while 100.0% lived in rural areas.

There were 561 households in New Plymouth, of which 32.8% had children under the age of 18 living in them. Of all households, 49.7% were married-couple households, 16.9% were households with a male householder and no spouse or partner present, and 27.3% were households with a female householder and no spouse or partner present. About 28.7% of all households were made up of individuals and 14.2% had someone living alone who was 65 years of age or older.

There were 593 housing units, of which 5.4% were vacant. The homeowner vacancy rate was 1.9% and the rental vacancy rate was 3.0%.

Racial composition as of the 2020 census
Race	Number	Percent
White	1,231	82.4%
Black or African American	1	0.1%
American Indian and Alaska Native	17	1.1%
Asian	16	1.1%
Native Hawaiian and Other Pacific Islander	1	0.1%
Some other race	93	6.2%
Two or more races	135	9.0%
Hispanic or Latino (of any race)	210	14.1%

=== 2010 census ===
At the 2010 census there were 1,538 people in 565 households, including 405 families, in the city. The population density was 2,229.0 inhabitants per square mile (860.6/km^{2}). There were 608 housing units at an average density of 881.2 per square mile (340.2/km^{2}). The racial makup of the city was 89.3% White, 0.2% African American, 0.5% Native American, 0.3% Asian, 6.8% from other races, and 2.9% from two or more races. Hispanic or Latino of any race were 13.3%.

Of the 565 households 37.5% had children under the age of 18 living with them, 54.7% were married couples living together, 11.5% had a female householder with no husband present, 5.5% had a male householder with no wife present, and 28.3% were non-families. 23.5% of households were one person and 11.8% were one person aged 65 or older. The average household size was 2.72 and the average family size was 3.23.

The median age was 36.1 years. 29.4% of residents were under the age of 18; 7.6% were between the ages of 18 and 24; 24% were from 25 to 44; 22.9% were from 45 to 64; and 16% were 65 or older. The gender makeup of the city was 49.7% male and 50.3% female.

=== 2000 census ===
At the 2000 census there were 1,400 people in 524 households, including 372 families, in the city. The racial makup of the city was 94.36% White, 0.29% African American, 0.79% Native American, 0.21% Asian, 2.86% from other races, and 1.50% from two or more races. Hispanic or Latino of any race were 9.86%.

Of the 524 households 38.0% had children under the age of 18 living with them, 56.1% were married couples living together, 10.7% had a female householder with no husband present, and 29.0% were non-families. 25.6% of households were one person and 13.7% were one person aged 65 or older. The average household size was 2.67 and the average family size was 3.23.

The age distribution was 31.7% under the age of 18, 6.7% from 18 to 24, 27.9% from 25 to 44, 18.6% from 45 to 64, and 15.1% 65 or older. The median age was 34 years. For every 100 females, there were 95.3 males. For every 100 females age 18 and over, there were 88.6 males.

The median household income was $30,524 and the median family income was $33,224. Males had a median income of $28,529 versus $21,161 for females. The per capita income for the city was $12,624. About 12.3% of families and 17.2% of the population were below the poverty line, including 25.9% of those under age 18 and 8.9% of those age 65 or over.

== Government ==
New Plymouth contracts with Payette County Sheriff's for Law Enforcement. The city is governed by an elected mayor and members of the city council.

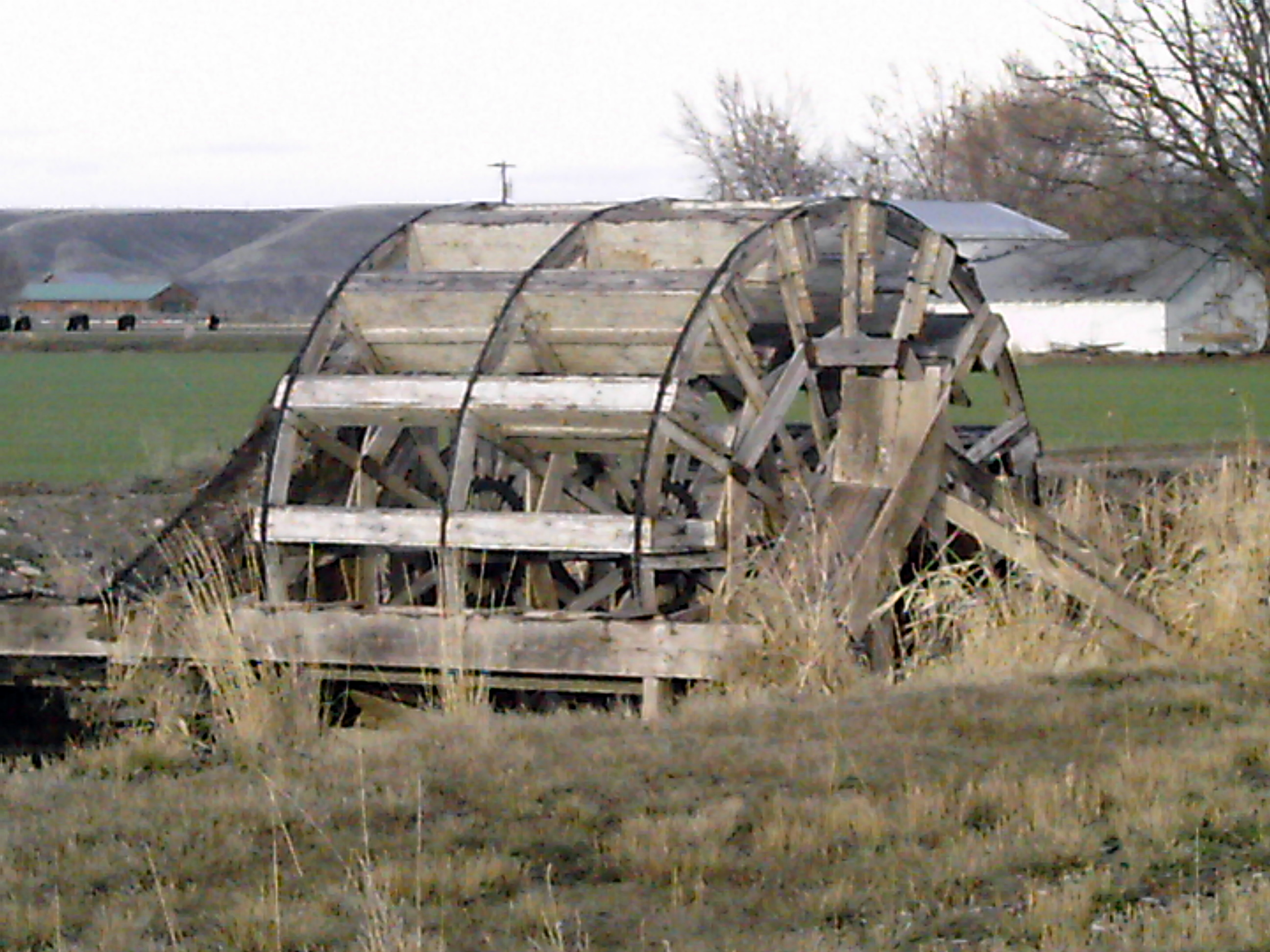
Example of a New Plymouth waterwheel.

== Points of interest ==
- Tuttle Blacksmith Shop, the oldest building in town
- The Waterwheels located on Southwest First Avenue
- Payette County Fairgrounds
- Internet Truck Stops Headquarters
- New Plymouth High School
- Armoral Tuttle Public Library

== Boulevard ==
The Boulevard is the main residential area and the original setting of the town. There are many unique things about the boulevard. First, it is in the shape of a horseshoe with a large park down the middle. Also, a system of ditches parallel the roads and drain into the canal, giving each landowner who pays for a share access to irrigation water. This comes from the days when farming was intended to be done inside the city. It is now used for gardening or watering the lawn. It also now includes a frisbee golf course along the west side.

== See also ==
- National Irrigation Congress
