= Fruitland, Idaho =

City in Payette County, Idaho, United States

- City
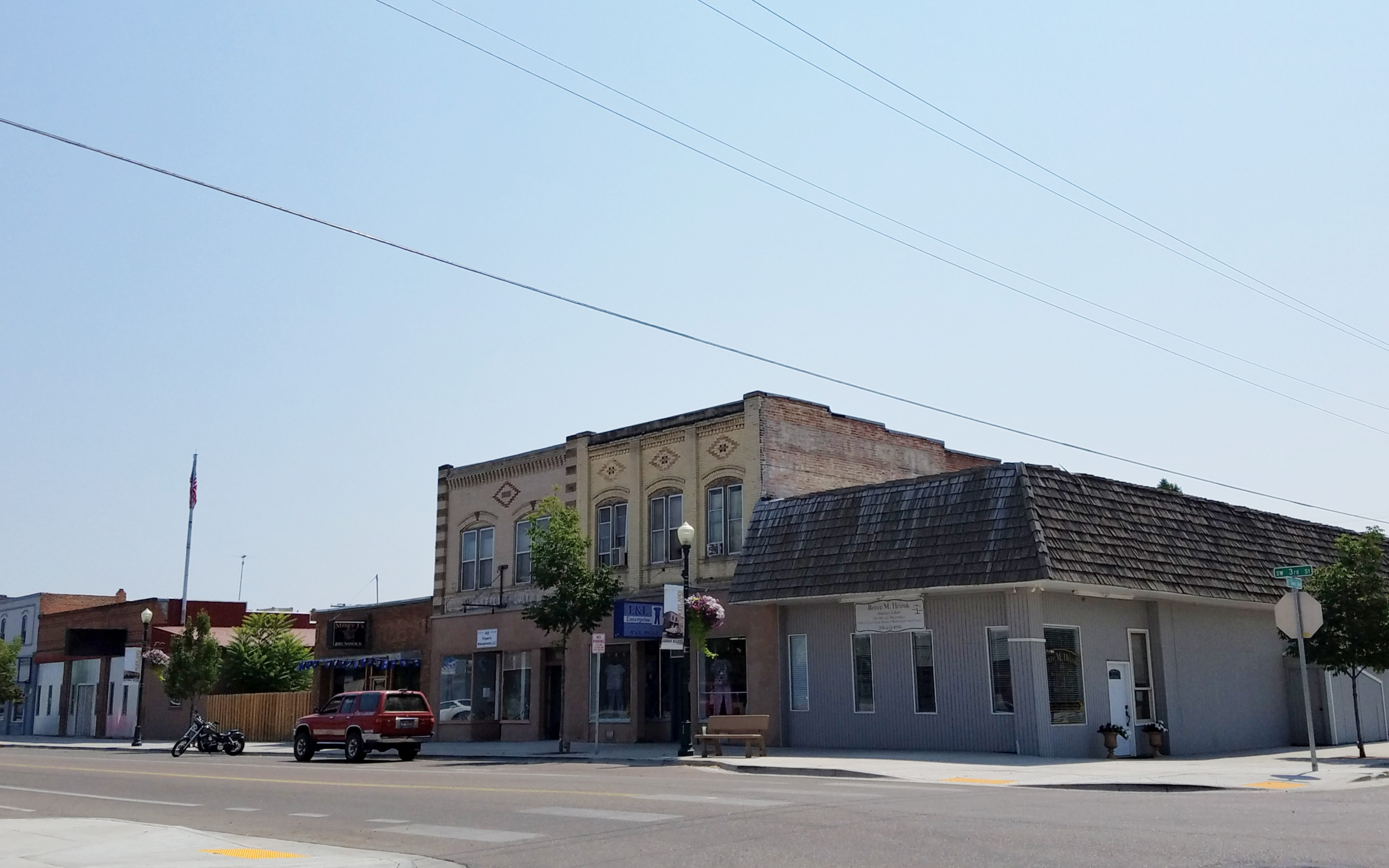

- Location of Fruitland in Payette County, Idaho.
- Coordinates: 44°00′48″N 116°55′08″W
- Country: United States
- State: Idaho
- County: Payette

Area
  - Total: 2.16 sq mi (5.59 km^{2})
  - Land: 2.15 sq mi (5.58 km^{2})
  - Water: 0.0039 sq mi (0.01 km^{2})
- Elevation: 2,208 ft (673 m)

Population (2020)
  - Total: 6,072
  - Density: 2,518.6/sq mi (972.42/km^{2})
- Time zone: UTC-7 (Mountain (MST))
  - Summer (DST): UTC-6 (MDT)
- ZIP code: 83619
- Area codes: 208, 986
- FIPS code: 16-28990
- GNIS feature ID: 2410554
- Website: fruitland.org

Fruitland is a city along the Snake and Payette rivers in Payette County, Idaho, United States. It lies along U.S. Route 95 in the Treasure Valley of southwest Idaho, about 50 miles (80 km) west of Boise on the border with Oregon. It is part of the Ontario Micropolitan Area. Fruitland is named after apple orchards that surround the community, and its slogan is "The Big Apple of Idaho."

As of the 2020 census, the city had a total population of 6,072, up from 4,684 in 2010.

== Geography ==
Fruitland is located within the Payette River and Snake River watershed. Both rivers touch Fruitland city limits.

According to the United States Census Bureau, the city has a total area of 2.24 square miles (5.80 km^{2}), of which, 2.23 square miles (5.78 km^{2}) is land and 0.01 square miles (0.03 km^{2}) is water.

== Demographics ==
=== 2020 census ===
Note: the US Census treats Hispanic/Latino as an ethnic category. This table excludes Latinos from the racial categories and assigns them to a separate category. Hispanics/Latinos can be of any race.

Fruitland racial composition (NH = Non-Hispanic)
Race	Number	Percentage
White (NH)	4,130	68.02%
Black or African American (NH)	22	0.36%
Native American or Alaska Native (NH)	33	0.54%
Asian (NH)	78	1.28%
Pacific Islander (NH)	7	0.12%
Some Other Race (NH)	22	0.36%
Mixed/Multi-Racial (NH)	272	4.48%
Hispanic or Latino	1,508	24.84%
Total	6,072	

As of the 2020 census, Fruitland had a population of 6,072. The median age was 35.8 years. 30.1% of residents were under the age of 18 and 17.3% were 65 years of age or older. For every 100 females, there were 95.7 males, and for every 100 females age 18 and over there were 88.7 males age 18 and over.

99.7% of residents lived in urban areas, while 0.3% lived in rural areas.

There were 2,168 households and 1,286 families in the city. Of all households, 38.6% had children under the age of 18 living in them, 53.1% were married-couple households, 13.2% were households with a male householder and no spouse or partner present, and 26.8% were households with a female householder and no spouse or partner present. About 25.2% of all households were made up of individuals, and 15.7% had someone living alone who was 65 years of age or older.

There were 2,266 housing units, of which 4.3% were vacant. The homeowner vacancy rate was 1.7% and the rental vacancy rate was 4.3%.

=== 2010 census ===
Historical population
Census	Pop.	Note	%±
1950	573		—
1960	804		40.3%
1970	1,576		96.0%
1980	2,559		62.4%
1990	2,400		−6.2%
2000	3,805		58.5%
2010	4,684		23.1%
2020	6,072		29.6%
2023 (est.)	6,879		13.3%
U.S. Decennial Census

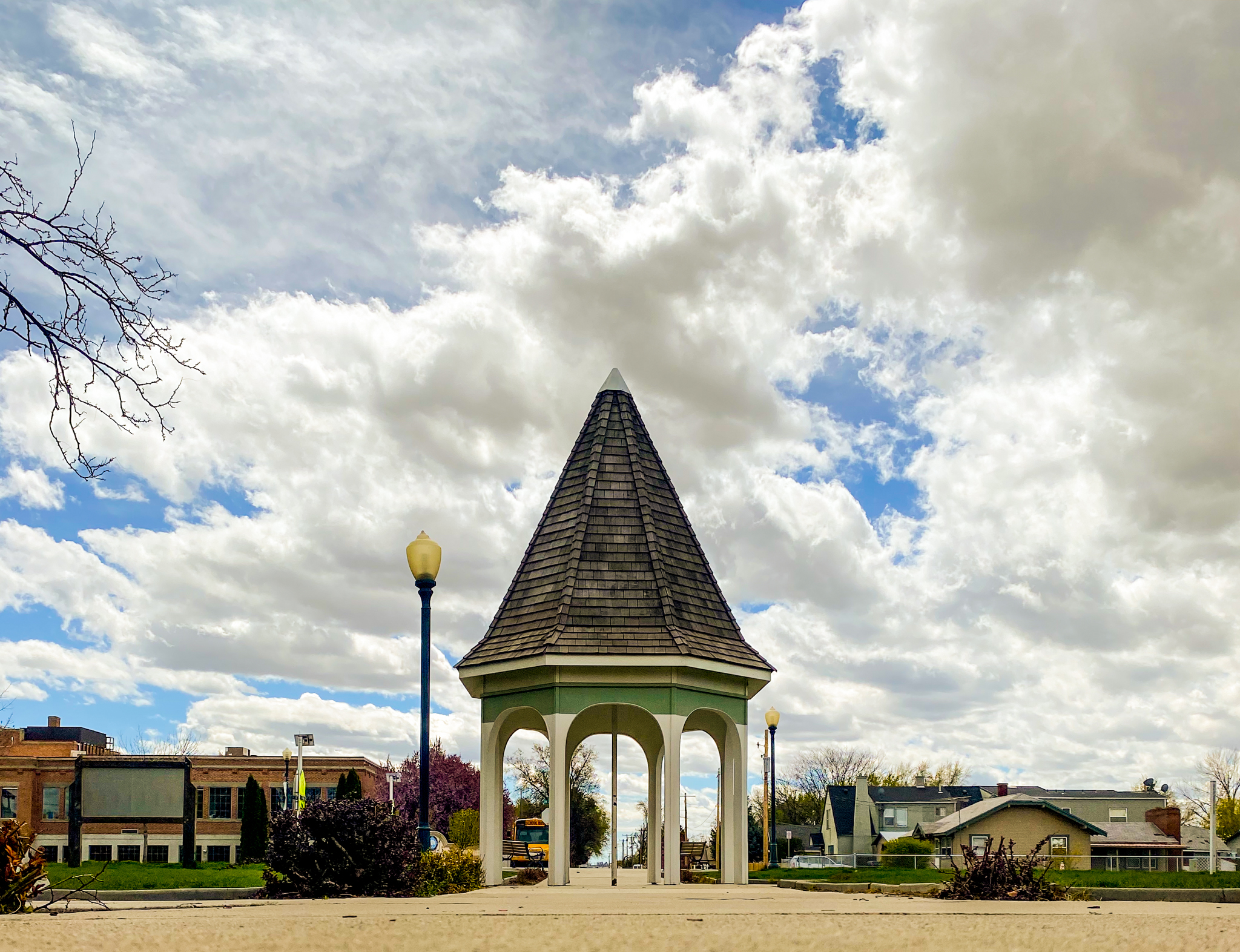
Fruitland community park, April 2022

As of the census of 2010, there were 4,684 people, 1,700 households, and 1,243 families living in the city. The population density was 2,100.4 inhabitants per square mile (811.0/km^{2}). There were 1,836 housing units at an average density of 823.3 per square mile (317.9/km^{2}). The racial makeup of the city was 84.0% White, 0.5% African American, 1.0% Native American, 1.1% Asian, 0.1% Pacific Islander, 10.3% from other races, and 2.8% from two or more races. Hispanic or Latino of any race were 22.6% of the population.

There were 1,700 households, of which 42.5% had children under the age of 18 living with them, 55.0% were married couples living together, 12.8% had a female householder with no husband present, 5.3% had a male householder with no wife present, and 26.9% were non-families. 23.5% of all households were made up of individuals, and 12% had someone living alone who was 65 years of age or older. The average household size was 2.76 and the average family size was 3.26.

The median age in the city was 32.7 years. 31.7% of residents were under the age of 18; 7.8% were between the ages of 18 and 24; 25.4% were from 25 to 44; 21.1% were from 45 to 64; and 13.9% were 65 years of age or older. The gender makeup of the city was 48.8% male and 51.2% female.

=== 2000 census ===
As of the census of 2000, there were 3,805 people, 1,378 households, and 1,044 families living in the city. The population density was 2,512.2 inhabitants per square mile (970.0/km^{2}). There were 1,518 housing units at an average density of 1,002.2 per square mile (387.0/km^{2}). The racial makeup of the city was 87.70% White, 0.89% Asian, 0.60% Native American, 0.05% African American, 0.03% Pacific Islander, 8.02% from other races, and 2.71% from two or more races. Hispanic or Latino of any race were 17.92% of the population.

There were 1,378 households, out of which 40.6% had children under the age of 18 living with them, 58.1% were married couples living together, 13.1% had a female householder with no husband present, and 24.2% were non-families. 21.4% of all households were made up of individuals, and 10.6% had someone living alone who wais 65 years of age or older. The average household size was 2.76 and the average family size was 3.20.

In the city, the population was spread out, with 31.9% under the age of 18, 9.0% from 18 to 24, 27.6% from 25 to 44, 18.6% from 45 to 64, and 12.9% who were 65 years of age or older. The median age was 31 years. For every 100 females, there were 93.8 males. For every 100 females age 18 and over, there were 87.3 males.

The median income for a household in the city was $32,469, and the median income for a family was $36,614. Males had a median income of $31,419 versus $22,000 for females. The per capita income for the city was $14,488. About 8.3% of families and 11.9% of the population were below the poverty line, including 15.6% of those under the age of 18 and 14.0% of those 65 and older.

== Economy ==
Fruitland contains three large industrial facilities.

Swire Coca-Cola operates a large production and distribution facility at 600 NW 7th Street in Fruitland. Swire employs approximately 500 people. This location bottles, packages, and distributes both carbonated and non-carbonated beverages (including Dr. Pepper products) to many of the mountain west and Pacific Northwest states.

Woodgrain operates a processing mill at 300 NW 16th Street in Fruitland. Woodgrain employs approximately 300 people. Wood pellets, door and window moldings, as well as other wood products are produced here.

Dickinson Frozen Foods, an Oregon Potato Company facility, operates an onion and bell pepper processing plant at 600 NW 21st Street in Fruitland. Dickinson Frozen Foods employs approximately 250 employees and operates year round.

== Government ==
The Mayor and Council are elected at large by the citizens of Fruitland. They are elected to serve a four year term unless appointed.

Mayor: Kari Peterson (Ends 1/2030)

Council: Thomas Limbaugh (Ends 1/2028), Ed Pierson (Ends 1/2030), Jeff Carpenter (Ends 1/2028), and Cathy Yasuda (Ends 1/2030)

== See also ==
- List of cities in Idaho
