= List of counties in Idaho =

Counties of Idaho
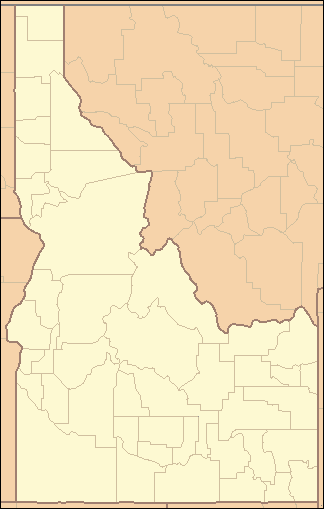
- Location: State of Idaho
- Number: 44
- Populations: 783 (Clark) – 546,141 (Ada)
- Areas: 408 square miles (1,060 km^{2}) (Payette) – 8,485 square miles (21,980 km^{2}) (Idaho)
- Government: County government
- Subdivisions: Cities, towns, townships, unincorporated communities, Indian reservations, census-designated places

There are 44 counties in the U.S. state of Idaho.

The Idaho Territory was organized in March 1863, and Owyhee County was the first county in the territory to be organized, in December of that year. Oneida County was organized in January 1864, while Missoula County was adopted the same month, before becoming part of the new Montana Territory in May. Shoshone, Nez Perce, Idaho and Boise Counties were recognized in February 1864; Alturas County was organized the same month. In December 1864, Kootenai and Ada Counties were created; Lah-Toh County was also created at this time but was abolished in 1867.

Idaho's present-day boundaries were established in 1868, and Lemhi County was created the following year. By the time Idaho was admitted to the Union as the 43rd state in 1890, a further eight counties had been created, bringing the total to 18. After Canyon, Fremont and Bannock Counties had been created, Alturas and Logan Counties were merged to form Blaine County in March 1895; Lincoln County was formed out of Blaine County later the same month. Bonner and Twin Falls Counties were created in 1907, before a further 21 counties were created between 1911 and 1919, bringing the total to the present-day 44.

Since 1945, each county has used a code on its license plates that features the first letter of the county's name. Where the names of two or more counties start with the same letter, in each of these counties the letter is preceded by a number indicating that county's order in the alphabetical list. For instance, the four counties beginning with 'L' in alphabetical order are Latah, Lemhi, Lewis and Lincoln; the codes for these counties are thus 1L, 2L, 3L and 4L respectively. Elmore, Idaho, Kootenai, Nez Perce, Shoshone, Valley, and Washington Counties are the only ones in the state with their respective first letters; in these counties, the letter alone serves as the code.

== Alphabetical list ==
County	FIPS code	County seat	Est.	Origin	License plate prefix	Etymology	Population	Area	Map
Ada County	001	Boise	December 22, 1864	Boise County	1A	Ada Riggs (1856-1909), daughter of H. C. Riggs, a member of the Idaho Territorial Legislature.	546,141	1,055 sq mi (2,732 km^{2})	State map highlighting Ada County
Adams County	003	Council	March 15, 1911	Washington County	2A	John Adams (1735–1826), second President of the United States (1797–1801).	5,013	1,365 sq mi (3,535 km^{2})	State map highlighting Adams County
Bannock County	005	Pocatello	March 6, 1893	Bingham County	1B	Bannock Native American tribe.	91,591	1,113 sq mi (2,883 km^{2})	State map highlighting Bannock County
Bear Lake County	007	Paris	January 5, 1875	Oneida County	2B	Bear Lake on the Utah/Idaho border.	6,727	971 sq mi (2,515 km^{2})	State map highlighting Bear Lake County
Benewah County	009	St. Maries	January 23, 1915	Kootenai County	3B	Ben'wah, chief of the Coeur d'Alene Tribe	10,508	776 sq mi (2,010 km^{2})	State map highlighting Benewah County
Bingham County	011	Blackfoot	January 13, 1885	Oneida County	4B	Henry H. Bingham (1841-1912), a general in the American Civil War and a U.S. Congressman from Pennsylvania.	51,153	2,095 sq mi (5,426 km^{2})	State map highlighting Bingham County
Blaine County	013	Hailey	March 5, 1895	Alturas and Logan Counties	5B	James G. Blaine (1830-1893), United States Secretary of State (1881, 1889-1892).	25,517	2,645 sq mi (6,851 km^{2})	State map highlighting Blaine County
Boise County	015	Idaho City	January 12, 1864	original county	6B	Boise River	8,545	1,902 sq mi (4,926 km^{2})	State map highlighting Boise County
Bonner County	017	Sandpoint	February 21, 1907	Kootenai County	7B	Edwin L. Bonner (1834-1902), originator of an 1864 ferry service on the Kootenai River.	54,420	1,738 sq mi (4,501 km^{2})	State map highlighting Bonner County
Bonneville County	019	Idaho Falls	February 7, 1911	Bingham County	8B	Benjamin Bonneville (1796-1878), a French-born explorer of the West.	135,771	1,869 sq mi (4,841 km^{2})	State map highlighting Bonneville County
Boundary County	021	Bonners Ferry	January 23, 1915	Bonner County	9B	Borders Canada on the north.	13,997	1,269 sq mi (3,287 km^{2})	State map highlighting Boundary County
Butte County	023	Arco	February 6, 1917	Bingham, Blaine, and Jefferson Counties	10B	Buttes rising from the Snake River Plain.	2,783	2,233 sq mi (5,783 km^{2})	State map highlighting Butte County
Camas County	025	Fairfield	February 6, 1917	Blaine County	1C	Camassia, a plant species important as a food source among Native Americans and early settlers.	1,316	1,077 sq mi (2,789 km^{2})	State map highlighting Camas County
Canyon County	027	Caldwell	November 26, 1892	Ada County	2C	Disputed, either a canyon of the Boise River near Caldwell or a canyon of the Snake River which forms part of the county's boundary.	275,123	590 sq mi (1,528 km^{2})	State map highlighting Canyon County
Caribou County	029	Soda Springs	February 11, 1919	Bannock County	3C	Caribou Range	7,252	1,766 sq mi (4,574 km^{2})	State map highlighting Caribou County
Cassia County	031	Burley	February 20, 1879	Owyhee County	4C	Disputed, either Cassia Creek or a member of the Mormon Battalion, James John Cazier (1821-1890).	26,397	2,567 sq mi (6,648 km^{2})	State map highlighting Cassia County
Clark County	033	Dubois	February 1, 1919	Fremont County	5C	Sam K. Clark (1857-1933), early settler and a member of the Idaho Senate.	783	1,765 sq mi (4,571 km^{2})	State map highlighting Clark County
Clearwater County	035	Orofino	February 27, 1911	Nez Perce County	6C	Clearwater River	9,118	2,462 sq mi (6,377 km^{2})	State map highlighting Clearwater County
Custer County	037	Challis	April 1, 1881	Alturas and Lemhi Counties	7C	General Custer mine, named after George Armstrong Custer (1839-1876), United States Army general.	4,636	4,926 sq mi (12,758 km^{2})	State map highlighting Custer County
Elmore County	039	Mountain Home	February 7, 1889	Alturas County	E	Ida Elmore mines, locally noted for gold and silver production in the 1860s.	29,465	3,078 sq mi (7,972 km^{2})	State map highlighting Elmore County
Franklin County	041	Preston	January 30, 1913	Oneida County	1F	Franklin D. Richards (1821-1899), early LDS Church apostle.	15,889	666 sq mi (1,725 km^{2})	State map highlighting Franklin County
Fremont County	043	Saint Anthony	March 4, 1893	Bingham County	2F	John C. Frémont (1813-1890), an explorer of the West.	14,208	1,867 sq mi (4,836 km^{2})	State map highlighting Fremont County
Gem County	045	Emmett	May 11, 1915	Boise and Canyon Counties	1G	State nickname of "Gem State."	21,773	563 sq mi (1,458 km^{2})	State map highlighting Gem County
Gooding County	047	Gooding	January 28, 1913	Lincoln County	2G	Frank R. Gooding (1859-1928), seventh governor of Idaho (1905-1909), U.S. Senator (1921-1928).	16,446	731 sq mi (1,893 km^{2})	State map highlighting Gooding County
Idaho County	049	Grangeville	December 20, 1861	original county	I	Columbia River steamship Idaho launched in 1860. Name predates both Idaho Territory and the State of Idaho.	17,874	8,485 sq mi (21,976 km^{2})	State map highlighting Idaho County
Jefferson County	051	Rigby	November 4, 1913	Fremont County	1J	Thomas Jefferson (1743-1826), third President of the United States (1801-1809).	35,297	1,095 sq mi (2,836 km^{2})	State map highlighting Jefferson County
Jerome County	053	Jerome	February 8, 1919	Gooding and Lincoln Counties	2J	Disputed, either North Side Irrigation Project developer Jerome Hill, his son-in-law Jerome Kuhn (1898-1952), or his grandson Jerome Kuhn, Jr.	26,362	600 sq mi (1,554 km^{2})	State map highlighting Jerome County
Kootenai County	055	Coeur d'Alene	December 22, 1864	Nez Perce County	K	Kootenai Native American tribe.	191,864	1,245 sq mi (3,225 km^{2})	State map highlighting Kootenai County
Latah County	057	Moscow	May 14, 1888	Nez Perce County	1L	Latah Creek, Nez Perce for "the place of pine trees and sestle."	41,842	1,077 sq mi (2,789 km^{2})	State map highlighting Latah County
Lemhi County	059	Salmon	January 9, 1869	Idaho County	2L	Limhi, king of the Nephites according to the Book of Mormon.	8,474	4,564 sq mi (11,821 km^{2})	State map highlighting Lemhi County
Lewis County	061	Nezperce	March 20, 1911	Nez Perce County	3L	Meriwether Lewis (1774-1809), a leader of the Lewis and Clark Expedition.	3,704	479 sq mi (1,241 km^{2})	State map highlighting Lewis County
Lincoln County	063	Shoshone	March 18, 1895	Blaine County	4L	Abraham Lincoln (1809-1865), sixteenth President of the United States (1861-1865). Idaho Territory was founded under Lincoln's administration.	5,603	1,206 sq mi (3,124 km^{2})	State map highlighting Lincoln County
Madison County	065	Rexburg	November 4, 1913	Fremont County	1M	James Madison (1751-1836), fourth President of the United States (1809-1817).	55,172	472 sq mi (1,222 km^{2})	State map highlighting Madison County
Minidoka County	067	Rupert	January 28, 1913	Lincoln County	2M	Disputed Native American origin, either Lakota for "a fountain or spring of water" or Shoshoni for "broad expanse."	22,911	760 sq mi (1,968 km^{2})	State map highlighting Minidoka County
Nez Perce County	069	Lewiston	December 20, 1861	original county	N	The Nez Perce, a Native American tribe.	42,905	849 sq mi (2,199 km^{2})	State map highlighting Nez Perce County
Oneida County	071	Malad City	January 22, 1864	original county	1O	Oneida Lake in New York state, where many early settlers were from.	5,085	1,200 sq mi (3,108 km^{2})	State map highlighting Oneida County
Owyhee County	073	Murphy	December 31, 1863	original county	2O	Alternate spelling of Hawaii. Hawaiian fur trappers explored the area in 1819 and 1820.	12,661	7,678 sq mi (19,886 km^{2})	State map highlighting Owyhee County
Payette County	075	Payette	May 11, 1917	Canyon County	1P	Francois Payette (1793-1844?), Canadian-born fur trader and early settler.	27,824	408 sq mi (1,057 km^{2})	State map highlighting Payette County
Power County	077	American Falls	January 30, 1913	Bingham, Blaine, and Oneida Counties	2P	The American Falls Power Plant	8,246	1,406 sq mi (3,642 km^{2})	State map highlighting Power County
Shoshone County	079	Wallace	January 9, 1861	original county	S	Shoshone Native American tribe.	14,130	2,634 sq mi (6,822 km^{2})	State map highlighting Shoshone County
Teton County	081	Driggs	January 26, 1915	Bingham, Fremont, and Madison Counties	1T	Teton Range in Wyoming.	13,254	450 sq mi (1,165 km^{2})	State map highlighting Teton County
Twin Falls County	083	Twin Falls	February 21, 1907	Cassia County	2T	Twin Falls waterfall on the Snake River.	97,539	1,925 sq mi (4,986 km^{2})	State map highlighting Twin Falls County
Valley County	085	Cascade	November 6, 1918	Boise and Idaho Counties	V	Long Valley located in the county.	12,831	3,733 sq mi (9,668 km^{2})	State map highlighting Valley County
Washington County	087	Weiser	February 20, 1879	Ada County	W	George Washington (1732-1799), first President of the United States (1789-1797).	11,583	1,456 sq mi (3,771 km^{2})	State map highlighting Washington County

== Racial / Ethnic Profile of counties in Idaho (2020 Census) ==
Racial / Ethnic Profile of counties in Idaho (2020 Census)
Following is a table of counties in Idaho by race/ethnicity. The majority racial/ethnic group is coded per the key below.

Majority minority with no dominant group
Majority White
Majority Black
Majority Hispanic
Majority Asian
Majority Native American

Racial and ethnic composition of counties in Idaho (2020 Census) (NH = Non-Hispanic) Note: the US Census treats Hispanic/Latino as an ethnic category. This table excludes Latinos from the racial categories and assigns them to a separate category. Hispanics/Latinos may be of any race.
County	Location of County	Total Population	White alone (NH)	%	Black or African American alone (NH)	%	Native American or Alaska Native alone (NH)	%	Asian alone (NH)	%	Pacific Islander alone (NH)	%	Other race alone (NH)	%	Mixed race or Multiracial (NH)	%	Hispanic or Latino (any race)	%
Ada		494,967	397,998	80.41%	7,733	1.56%	2,269	0.46%	13,651	2.76%	1,219	0.25%	2,485	0.50%	24,389	4.93%	45,223	9.14%
Adams		4,379	3,992	91.16%	3	0.07%	27	0.62%	8	0.18%	0	0.00%	18	0.41%	179	4.09%	152	3.47%
Bannock		87,018	70,447	80.96%	688	0.79%	2,600	2.99%	1,148	1.32%	249	0.29%	371	0.43%	3,522	4.05%	7,993	9.19%
Bear Lake		6,372	5,977	93.80%	10	0.16%	25	0.39%	13	0.20%	2	0.03%	0	0.00%	137	2.15%	208	3.26%
Benewah		9,530	7,773	81.56%	8	0.08%	796	8.35%	30	0.31%	15	0.16%	70	0.73%	584	6.13%	254	2.67%
Bingham		47,992	34,937	72.80%	115	0.24%	2,892	6.03%	192	0.40%	38	0.08%	138	0.29%	1,349	2.81%	8,331	17.36%
Blaine		24,272	18,024	74.26%	45	0.19%	34	0.14%	211	0.87%	15	0.06%	116	0.48%	806	3.32%	5,021	20.69%
Boise		7,610	6,751	88.71%	19	0.25%	55	0.72%	36	0.47%	4	0.05%	84	1.10%	337	4.43%	324	4.26%
Bonner		47,110	42,344	89.88%	115	0.24%	307	0.65%	252	0.53%	39	0.08%	295	0.63%	2,254	4.78%	1,504	3.19%
Bonneville		123,964	99,943	80.62%	593	0.48%	677	0.55%	1,392	1.12%	145	0.12%	395	0.32%	3,725	3.00%	17,094	13.79%
Boundary		12,056	10,550	87.51%	27	0.22%	145	1.20%	72	0.60%	9	0.07%	71	0.59%	490	4.06%	692	5.74%
Butte		2,574	2,336	90.75%	2	0.08%	15	0.58%	3	0.12%	2	0.08%	2	0.08%	80	3.11%	134	5.21%
Camas		1,077	938	87.09%	2	0.19%	0	0.00%	8	0.74%	0	0.00%	5	0.46%	65	6.04%	59	5.48%
Canyon		231,105	155,401	67.24%	1,455	0.63%	1,176	0.51%	1,973	0.85%	620	0.27%	1,120	0.48%	10,194	4.41%	59,166	25.60%
Caribou		7,027	6,391	90.95%	0	0.00%	46	0.65%	9	0.13%	15	0.21%	14	0.20%	168	2.39%	384	5.46%
Cassia		24,655	16,522	67.01%	64	0.26%	122	0.49%	131	0.53%	29	0.12%	80	0.32%	521	2.11%	7,186	29.15%
Clark		790	463	58.61%	3	0.38%	2	0.25%	1	0.13%	0	0.00%	2	0.25%	31	3.92%	288	36.46%
Clearwater		8,734	7,882	90.25%	40	0.46%	133	1.52%	45	0.52%	2	0.02%	35	0.40%	297	3.40%	300	3.43%
Custer		4,275	3,893	91.06%	3	0.07%	32	0.75%	15	0.35%	1	0.02%	19	0.44%	156	3.65%	156	3.65%
Elmore		28,666	19,996	69.75%	688	2.40%	234	0.82%	766	2.67%	101	0.35%	145	0.51%	1,639	5.72%	5,097	17.78%
Franklin		14,194	12,701	89.48%	22	0.15%	75	0.53%	28	0.20%	7	0.05%	20	0.14%	318	2.24%	1,023	7.21%
Fremont		13,388	11,292	84.34%	21	0.16%	68	0.51%	44	0.33%	24	0.18%	34	0.25%	315	2.35%	1,590	11.88%
Gem		19,123	16,132	84.36%	29	0.15%	124	0.65%	99	0.52%	20	0.10%	96	0.50%	901	4.71%	1,722	9.00%
Gooding		15,598	10,044	64.39%	20	0.13%	70	0.45%	40	0.26%	4	0.03%	52	0.33%	521	3.34%	4,847	31.07%
Idaho		16,541	14,656	88.60%	54	0.33%	414	2.50%	55	0.33%	5	0.03%	94	0.57%	652	3.94%	611	3.69%
Jefferson		30,891	26,430	85.56%	73	0.24%	127	0.41%	118	0.38%	30	0.10%	106	0.34%	751	2.43%	3,256	10.54%
Jerome		24,237	14,153	58.39%	39	0.16%	110	0.45%	80	0.33%	22	0.09%	70	0.29%	587	2.42%	9,176	37.86%
Kootenai		171,362	149,107	87.01%	463	0.27%	1,715	1.00%	1,371	0.80%	195	0.11%	927	0.54%	8,828	5.15%	8,756	5.11%
Latah		39,517	33,476	84.71%	318	0.80%	263	0.67%	968	2.45%	48	0.12%	227	0.57%	2,144	5.43%	2,073	5.25%
Lemhi		7,974	7,280	91.30%	17	0.21%	46	0.58%	28	0.35%	6	0.08%	38	0.48%	264	3.31%	295	3.70%
Lewis		3,533	3,031	85.79%	6	0.17%	181	5.12%	7	0.20%	1	0.03%	12	0.34%	157	4.44%	138	3.91%
Lincoln		5,127	3,245	63.29%	6	0.12%	22	0.43%	10	0.20%	4	0.08%	5	0.10%	196	3.82%	1,639	31.97%
Madison		52,913	43,985	83.13%	709	1.34%	153	0.29%	933	1.76%	215	0.41%	165	0.31%	1,505	2.84%	5,248	9.92%
Minidoka		21,613	12,946	59.90%	27	0.12%	92	0.43%	51	0.24%	10	0.05%	57	0.26%	521	2.41%	7,909	36.59%
Nez Perce		42,090	35,436	84.19%	184	0.44%	2,336	5.55%	324	0.77%	32	0.08%	126	0.30%	2,022	4.80%	1,630	3.87%
Oneida		4,564	4,259	93.32%	2	0.04%	14	0.31%	14	0.31%	4	0.09%	8	0.18%	85	1.86%	178	3.90%
Owyhee		11,913	8,060	67.66%	28	0.23%	374	3.14%	42	0.35%	8	0.07%	68	0.57%	418	3.51%	2,915	24.47%
Payette		25,386	19,240	75.79%	52	0.20%	163	0.64%	207	0.82%	31	0.12%	133	0.52%	1,292	5.09%	4,268	16.81%
Power		7,878	4,826	61.26%	17	0.22%	172	2.18%	18	0.23%	8	0.10%	22	0.28%	191	2.42%	2,624	33.31%
Shoshone		13,169	11,771	89.38%	15	0.11%	145	1.10%	53	0.40%	6	0.05%	83	0.63%	646	4.91%	450	3.42%
Teton		11,630	9,141	78.60%	16	0.14%	25	0.21%	51	0.44%	0	0.00%	37	0.32%	340	2.92%	2,020	17.37%
Twin Falls		90,046	68,169	75.70%	1,021	1.13%	499	0.55%	1,403	1.56%	201	0.22%	267	0.30%	3,276	3.64%	15,210	16.89%
Valley		11,746	10,467	89.11%	16	0.14%	54	0.46%	55	0.47%	8	0.07%	78	0.66%	467	3.98%	601	5.12%
Washington		10,500	8,118	77.31%	17	0.16%	74	0.70%	81	0.77%	7	0.07%	53	0.50%	488	4.65%	1,662	15.83%

=== Extinct counties ===
- Alturas County created February 4, 1864, and abolished March 5, 1895.
- Logan County created February 7, 1889, and abolished March 5, 1895.
