= National Register of Historic Places listings in Gem County, Idaho =

Location of Gem County in Idaho

This is a list of the National Register of Historic Places listings in Gem County, Idaho.

This is intended to be a complete list of the properties on the National Register of Historic Places in Gem County, Idaho, United States. Latitude and longitude coordinates are provided for many National Register properties and districts; these locations may be seen together in a map.

There are 10 properties listed on the National Register in the county. More may be added; properties and districts nationwide are added to the Register weekly.

This National Park Service list is complete through NPS recent listings posted May 23, 2025.

== Current listings ==
	Name on the Register	Image	Date listed	Location	City or town	Description
1	F. T. Bliss House	F. T. Bliss House	November 17, 1982 (#82000345)	E. 2nd and McKinley Sts. 43°52′24″N 116°29′46″W	Emmett	
2	Catholic Church of the Sacred Heart	Catholic Church of the Sacred Heart	December 3, 1980 (#80001323)	211 E. 1st St. 43°52′28″N 116°29′54″W	Emmett	
3	Emmett Presbyterian Church	Emmett Presbyterian Church	December 3, 1980 (#80001324)	223 E. 2nd St. 43°52′24″N 116°29′51″W	Emmett	
4	First Baptist Church of Emmett	First Baptist Church of Emmett	December 3, 1980 (#80001325)	126 S. Hayes Ave. 43°52′29″N 116°29′54″W	Emmett	
5	Gem County Courthouse	Gem County Courthouse	November 17, 1982 (#82000347)	Main St. and McKinley Ave. 43°52′31″N 116°29′42″W	Emmett	
6	Methodist Episcopal Church	Methodist Episcopal Church	December 3, 1980 (#80001326)	132 S. Washington Ave. 43°52′29″N 116°29′59″W	Emmett	Building no longer exists.
7	Ola School	Ola School	May 5, 1992 (#92000415)	5 Ola School Rd. 44°10′37″N 116°17′24″W	Ola	
8	Oregon Short Line Railway Depot	Oregon Short Line Railway Depot	April 27, 1995 (#95000506)	119 N. Commercial Ave. 43°52′35″N 116°30′05″W	Emmett	
9	St. Mary's Episcopal Church	St. Mary's Episcopal Church	December 3, 1980 (#80001327)	219 E. 1st St. 43°52′28″N 116°29′51″W	Emmett	
10	Sweet Methodist Episcopal Church	Sweet Methodist Episcopal Church	July 9, 1997 (#97000766)	7200 Sweet-Ola Highway; 43°58′08″N 116°19′40″W	Sweet	

== Former listings ==
	Name on the Register	Image	Date listed	Date removed	Location	City or town	Description
1	Fletcher Oil Company Building		November 17, 1982 (#82000346)	October 16, 1989	Main St. and Boise Ave.	Emmett	Destroyed by fire, October 4, 1989.

== See also ==
- List of National Historic Landmarks in Idaho
- National Register of Historic Places listings in Idaho
