= Idaho State Highway 55 =

State highway in Idaho, United States

State Highway 55
- SH-55 highlighted in red

Route information
- Maintained by ITD
- Length: 148.701 mi (239.311 km)
- Existed: 1967–present
- Tourist routes: Payette River Scenic Byway

Major junctions
- South end: US 95 west of Marsing
- I-84 / US 30 from Nampa to Meridian; US 20 / US 26 in Eagle
- North end: US 95 in New Meadows

Location
- Country: United States
- State: Idaho
- Counties: Owyhee, Canyon, Ada, Boise, Valley, Adams

Highway system
- Idaho State Highway System; Interstate; US; State
← SH-54	→ SH-57

State Highway 55 (SH-55) is an Idaho highway from Marsing to New Meadows, connecting with US-95 at both ends.

From Marsing it travels east to Nampa, Meridian, and Eagle, then north to Horseshoe Bend. SH-55 then climbs the Payette River to Banks, then its north fork to the Long Valley, through the towns of Cascade and McCall. After descending a narrow canyon to Meadows, SH-55 terminates in New Meadows at the junction with US-95.

== Route description ==
In the southwest corner of Idaho, State Highway 55 starts at the junction with US-95, approximately two miles (3 km) west of Marsing, at an elevation of 2,305 feet (703 m) above sea level. The highway heads eastward as it travels through Marsing, crosses the Snake River and the Snake River Valley AVA. The highway continues east to Nampa (mostly as Karcher Road), where it meets Interstate 84 and US-30.

The highway is cosigned with those routes as it heads eastward to Meridian. SH-55 turns northward at Eagle Road and crosses the Boise River near Eagle. The junction with SH-44 is in Eagle, where the routes are briefly cosigned.

East of Eagle, SH-55 turns northward and climbs to the Spring Valley and over the Spring Valley Summit at 4,242 feet (1,293 m), then descends 1,600 vertical feet (490 m) on Horseshoe Bend Hill into Horseshoe Bend. The new multi-lane grade was completed in late 1991; the old curvier road to the west was long plagued by landslides and extended closures. North of Horseshoe Bend, the highway ascends the Payette River and passes through several recreational areas, which offer rafting, fishing, and camping activities. SH-55 continues north, through the small communities of Banks and Smiths Ferry, then crosses the river via the Rainbow Bridge (built in 1933), originally known as the North Fork Bridge.

SH-55 then climbs Round Valley Creek to Round Valley, and continues northward through the extended Long Valley of Valley County to the county seat of Cascade. It ascends a brief summit at 5,207 feet (1,587 m) at Little Donner then descends to follow the east shore of Cascade Reservoir. The route continues northward to Donnelly, the turnoff for Tamarack Resort, located to the southwest, on the western shore of the reservoir. SH-55 continues north through the valley to McCall, at the south shore of Payette Lake, the host of many scenic, recreational, and winter activities.

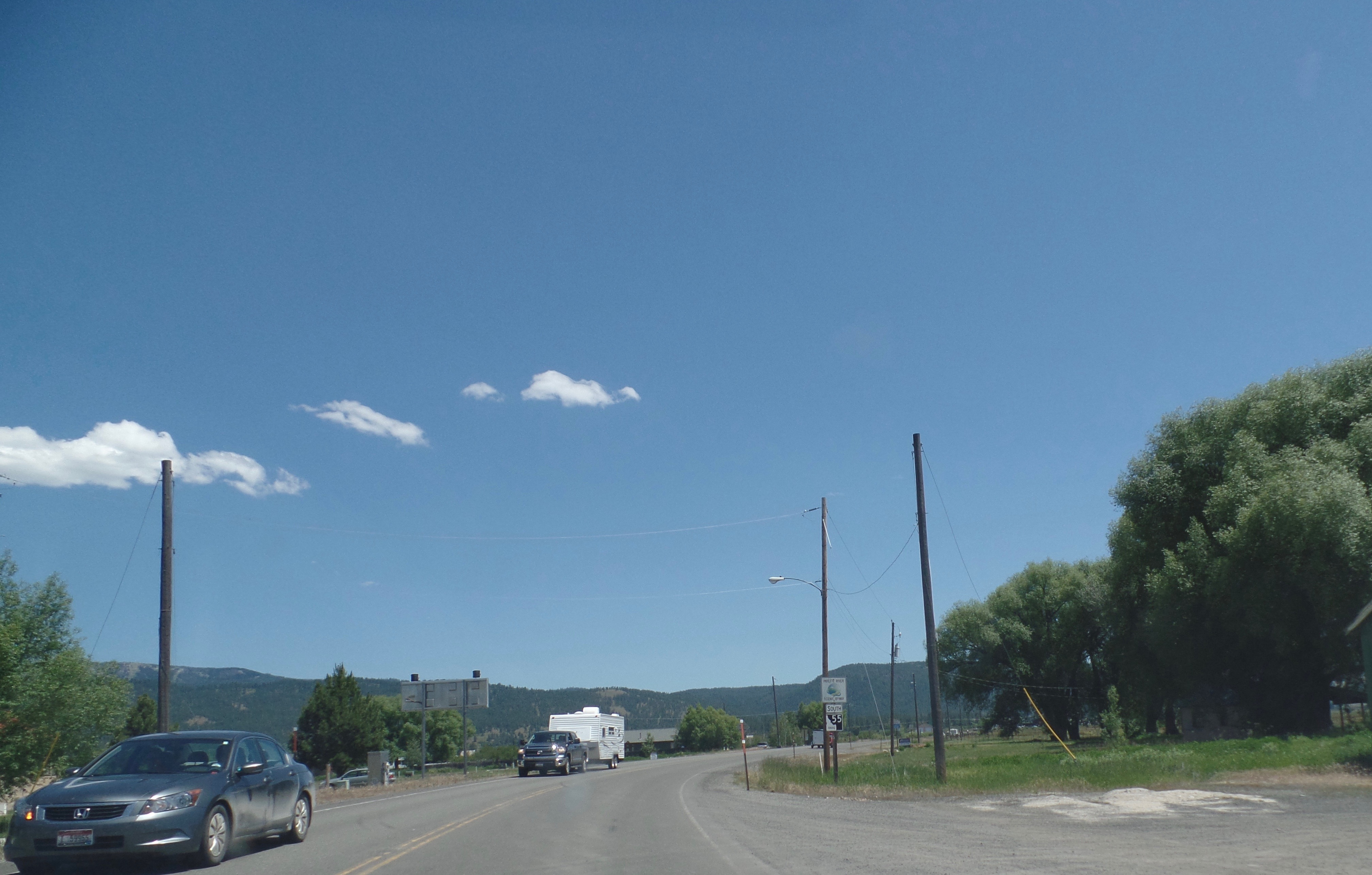
Southbound Highway 55 at its northern terminus in New Meadows

Meeting the south shore of Payette Lake, State Highway 55 turns westward as Lake Street through McCall and its west "Lardo" area. West of town, the road climbs to the Red Ridge, where it reaches its maximum elevation of 5,324 feet (1,623 m) at the Adams County line, also known as Goose Creek Summit immediately northeast of the Little Ski Hill.

Two miles (3 km) further is the turnoff for the Brundage Mountain ski area, four miles (6 km) north on Goose Lake Road. SH-55 then heads west and enters a narrow and twisty canyon, rapidly descending with Little Goose Creek to Meadows, then to its northern terminus, the junction with US-95 in New Meadows at 3,868 feet (1,180 m) in Meadows Valley.

State Highway 55, from Eagle north to US-95 in New Meadows, is the Payette River Scenic Byway, part of the National Scenic Byways Program.

== History ==
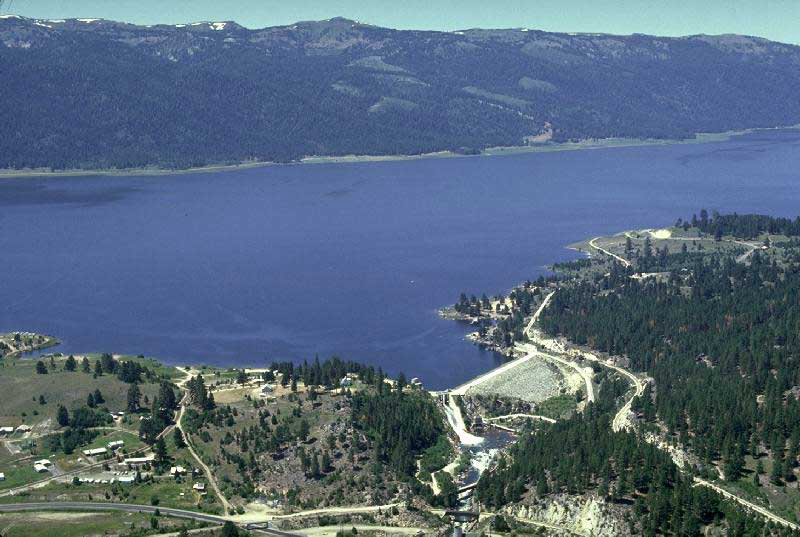
Cascade Dam and reservoir at Cascade in Valley County

The original State Highway 55 ran from US-2 in Colburn to what is now State Highway 200. This highway was decommissioned in October 1955, and is now Colburn-Culver Road.

The current route was designated as State Highway 55 in September 1967, replacing former State Highway 72 and former State Highway 15. Idaho State Highway 72 has since been reassigned to another road.

State Highway 55 was originally routed through downtown Boise, and followed the old alignment of State Highway 44 down State Street and 23rd Street to Fairview Avenue. From there it turned westward with US-20, US-26 and US-30. The highway continued westward on the Boise Connector then Interstate 180N (now Interstate 184), and continued west along Interstate 80N (now Interstate 84), where it followed its present alignment toward Nampa.

Prior to the 1990s, the eastern junction with SH-44 in Eagle was a quarter-mile (0.4 km) east at Horseshoe Bend Road, which was SH-55.

In late 2006, the route was realigned away from downtown Nampa when a new interchange, Interchange #33 along Interstate 84 was opened and provided a more direct connection to State Highway 55 from the Interstate. The segments of SH-55 following the former Nampa Boulevard (now Northside Boulevard) and Caldwell Boulevard (now Business Route 84) through Nampa have been decommissioned favoring the more direct routing. From there the highway followed its current alignment from that point to Marsing and its southern terminus at US-95.

== Major intersections ==
County	Location	mi	km	Destinations	Notes
Owyhee		0.00	0.00	US 95 – Homedale, Payette, Winnemucca	Elevation 2,305 ft (705 m)
Owyhee	Marsing	1.997	3.214	SH-78 south – Grand View, Bruneau, Givens Springs	
Canyon	Nampa	16.154	25.997	I-84 BL (Caldwell Boulevard)	
Canyon	Nampa	16.588	26.696	I-84 west (US-30) / Midland Boulevard – Caldwell, Ontario	West end of I-84 / US-30 overlap; SH-55 south follows exit 33A
see I-84 (mile 33.539–45.998)
Ada	Meridian	29.06	46.77	I-84 east (US-30) / South Eagle Road – Boise	East end of I-84 / US-30 overlap; SH-55 north follows exit 46
Ada	Boise–Eagle line	33.92	54.59	US 20 / US 26 (Chinden Boulevard) – Caldwell, Boise	
Ada	Eagle	35.83	57.66	SH-44 west / Eagle Road – Emmett, Caldwell, Eagle, Firebird	south end of SH-44 overlap
Ada	Eagle	37.79	60.82	SH-44 east – Boise	north end of SH-44 overlap
Boise	Horseshoe Bend	57.30	92.22	SH-52 west – Emmett, Payette	
Boise	Banks	78.82	126.85	Wildlife Canyon Scenic Byway (Banks–Lowman Road) – Garden Valley, Lowman	Elevation 2,815 ft (860 m); traffic signal being installed in spring 2025
Valley	No major junctions				
Adams	New Meadows	148.70	239.31	US 95 – Council, Grangeville, Lewiston	Elevation 3,868 ft (1,180 m)
1.000 mi = 1.609 km; 1.000 km = 0.621 mi: Concurrency terminus

== See also ==
- List of state highways in Idaho
- List of highways numbered 55
