= List of botanical gardens and arboretums in Idaho =

This list of botanical gardens and arboretums in Idaho is intended to include all significant botanical gardens and arboretums in the U.S. state of Idaho

Name	Image	Affiliation	City
Arboretum Park			Eagle
Idaho Botanical Garden			Boise
Idaho State Arboretum		Idaho State University	Pocatello
Sawtooth Botanical Garden			Ketchum
University of Idaho Arboretum and Botanical Garden		University of Idaho	Moscow

== See also ==
- List of botanical gardens and arboretums in the United States
