= Idaho State Highway 16 =

State highway in Ada and Gem counties in Idaho, United States

State Highway 16
- SH-16 highlighted in red

Route information
- Maintained by ITD
- Length: 16.005 mi (25.758 km)

Major junctions
- South end: US 20 / US 26 near Star
- North end: SH-52 at Emmett

Location
- Country: United States
- State: Idaho

Highway system
- Idaho State Highway System; Interstate; US; State
| ← I-15 | → SH-19 |

State Highway 16 (SH-16) in Idaho is a 16-mile (26 km) route, connecting Emmett with US-20/US-26 and Star.

== Route description ==
Also known as the Central Valley Expressway and the Emmett Highway, Highway 16 begins at the junction of US-20/US-26. It meets at a junction with State Highway 44, with Star to the West, and Eagle to the East. The highway continues north through Jackass Gulch and descends over 500 vertical feet (150 m) on the Freezeout Grade into the Emmett Valley. The highway then curves westward for a short distance, where it terminates at the junction with State Highway 52 just south of the Emmett city limits.

== History ==
This route has been in existence since 1929. The original alignment terminated in Horseshoe Bend. In 1938, the northern section of the alignment from Emmett to Horseshoe Bend was then replaced by State Highway 52. When this happened, the highway then realigned to the west, terminating in Payette. The route was truncated at its current terminus in Emmett in 1955 when Highway 52 was extended on to its northern section heading toward New Plymouth.

While campaigning for a return to Congress in 1934, Robert McCracken died in an automobile accident on the highway in May, near Emmett. His vehicle went through a guard rail and tumbled down Freezeout Hill.

Firebird Raceway opened 58 years ago in 1968 on the west side of the highway, between Star and Emmett.

In December 2012, construction began on the 2.1-mile Boise River Bridge section between SH-44 and US-20/26. This was the first phase of a long-range plan to extend the highway south to Interstate 84. This 4-lane divided limited-access expressway opened to traffic on August 15, 2014.

== Future ==
Construction is underway to extend SH-16 to Interstate 84. The new section will be a freeway with 2 lanes in each direction and interchanges at Franklin Road, Ustick Road, Chinden Boulevard (US-20/US-26), and State Street (SH-44). The new alignment will terminate at a new system interchange with I-84. The entire corridor is expected to open in 2027.

ITD plans to widen the remainder of SH-16 from SH-44 to Emmett to a 4-lane divided highway. The first stretch to be constructed will be from SH-44 to Beacon Light Road in Star.

ITD is studying the possibility of extending SH-16 south of Interstate 84.

== Major intersections ==
| County | Location | mi | km | Destinations | Notes |
|---|---|---|---|---|---|
| Canyon | Nampa | | | I-84 – Ontario, Portland, Boise | Future southern terminus; system-to-system interchange under construction |
| Canyon | Nampa | | | Franklin Road | Single-point urban interchange (SPUI) under construction |
| Canyon–Ada county line | Nampa–Meridian line | | | Ustick Road | Diamond interchange under construction |
| Ada | Meridian | 97.902 | 157.558 | US 20 / US 26 (Chinden Boulevard) – Caldwell, Boise | Southern terminus; new interchange under construction |
| Ada | Star | 100 | 160 | SH-44 – Star, Eagle | New interchange under construction |
| Gem | Emmett | 113.907 | 183.316 | SH-52 – Horseshoe Bend, Payette | Northern terminus; road continues west as SH-52 |
1.000 mi = 1.609 km; 1.000 km = 0.621 mi: Concurrency terminus; Incomplete access; Route transition; Unopened

== See also ==
- List of state highways in Idaho
- List of highways numbered 16
