= Idaho State Highway 44 =

State highway in the U.S. State of Idaho

State Highway 44
- SH-44 highlighted in red

Route information
- Maintained by ITD
- Length: 23.089 mi (37.158 km)

Major junctions
- West end: I-84 near Caldwell
- East end: US 20 / US 26 in Garden City

Location
- Country: United States
- State: Idaho
- Counties: Canyon, Ada

Highway system
- Idaho State Highway System; Interstate; US; State
← SH-43	→ SH-45

State Highway 44 (SH-44) is a 23.089-mile-long (37.158 km) state highway in the U.S. State of Idaho. SH-44 travels through the Treasure Valley from Interstate 84 (I-84) to U.S. Route 20 (US-20) and US-26 in Garden City, Idaho.

== Route description ==
State Highway 44 starts at the junction of Interstate 84 north of Caldwell at Exit 25. The highway heads eastward staying mostly to the north of the Boise River. The highway goes through the cities of Middleton and Star. Just to the east of Star meets its junction with State Highway 16. SH-44 continues east through Eagle and intersects with State Highway 55. From Eagle eastward, the highway is also known as State Street and continues toward Boise. The highway turns southward onto Glenwood Street in Garden City where it continues for approximately 1.3 miles (2.1 km) before ending at Chinden Boulevard (US-20/US-26).

== History ==
This route is believed to have been in existence since 1934. A previous alignment of State Highway 44 continued eastward down State Street past Glenwood Street further into downtown Boise. The highway turned south onto 23rd Street and continued several blocks to Fairview Avenue which, at the time, was also US-20, US-26 and US-30. SH-44 was also cosigned with State Highway 55 from Horseshoe Bend Road east to its terminus at Fairview Ave in Boise. There, SH-55 turned west and followed the US-20/26/30 complex to Interstate 184.

== Future ==
Construction is underway to widen SH-44 to 5 lanes from Star Road to State Highway 16. This project is being done in coordination with construction of the new SH-16/SH-44 interchange. Construction is expected to be completed in late 2027. When completed, SH-44 will have a continuous 2 lanes in each direction from Star to Garden City.

ITD has future plans to widen SH-44 to 5 lanes from Interstate 84 to Star Road. ITD's preferred alternative includes a bypass in Middleton, but Middleton city officials are opposed to a bypass.

== Major intersections ==
County	Location	mi	km	Destinations	Notes
Canyon		0.000	0.000	I-84 – Caldwell, Ontario	Western terminus; I-84 exit 25; diamond interchange
Ada	Star	12.2	19.6	SH-16 – Nampa, Emmett	
Ada	Eagle	17.640	28.389	SH-55 south – Meridian	Western end of SH-55 overlap
Ada	Eagle	19.410	31.237	SH-55 north – Horseshoe Bend, McCall	Eastern end of SH-55 overlap
Ada	Garden City	23.089	37.158	US 20 / US 26 – Boise	Eastern terminus
1.000 mi = 1.609 km; 1.000 km = 0.621 mi: Concurrency terminus
