= Banks, Idaho =

Census-designated place in Boise County, Idaho, United States

- Census-designated place
- Location of Banks in Boise County, Idaho.

- Location in the United States Location in Idaho
- Coordinates: 44°04′48″N 116°07′26″W
- Country: United States
- State: Idaho
- County: Boise

Area
  - Total: 2.249 sq mi (5.82 km^{2})
  - Land: 2.209 sq mi (5.72 km^{2})
  - Water: 0.040 sq mi (0.10 km^{2})
- Elevation: 3,488 ft (1,063 m)

Population (2020)
  - Total: 22
  - Density: 10/sq mi (3.8/km^{2})
- Time zone: UTC-7 (Mountain (MST))
  - Summer (DST): UTC-6 (MDT)
- ZIP code: 83602
- Area codes: 208, 986
- GNIS feature ID: 2585566

Banks is a census-designated place along the Payette River in Boise County, Idaho, United States, 12 miles (20 km) north-northeast of Horseshoe Bend on Idaho State Highway 55. The population was 22 at the 2020 census.

== Description ==
Banks has a post office with ZIP code 83602. As of the 2010 census, its population was 17, and its elevation is 2,881 feet (878 m) above sea level.

The North and South forks of the Payette River meet at Banks, which makes it a popular destination for rafting and kayaking. The "Main" run of the Payette River begins at Banks and parallels Highway 55 down to Horseshoe Bend, while the "Staircase" run on the South Fork ends at Banks.

== Demographics ==
Historical population
Census	Pop.	Note	%±
2010	17		—
2020	22		29.4%
U.S. Decennial Census

Banks' population was 50 in 1960.

== Climate ==
This climatic region has large seasonal temperature differences, with warm to hot (and often humid) summers and cold (sometimes severely cold) winters. According to the Köppen Climate Classification system, Banks has a humid continental climate, abbreviated "Dfb" on climate maps.

== See also ==
- List of census-designated places in Idaho
