= Idaho State Highway 52 =

State highway in Idaho, United States

State Highway 52
- SH-52 highlighted in red

Route information
- Maintained by ITD
- Length: 54.126 mi (87.107 km)
- Existed: 1938–present

Major junctions
- West end: OR 52 at the Snake River/Oregon state line near Payette
- US 95 in Payette
- East end: SH-55 in Horseshoe Bend

Location
- Country: United States
- State: Idaho
- Counties: Payette, Gem, Boise

Highway system
- Idaho State Highway System; Interstate; US; State
← SH-51	→ SH-53

State Highway 52 (SH-52) is a 54.126-mile-long (87.107 km) state highway in the U.S. state of Idaho that travels along the Payette River from the Oregon State Line and Snake River to Horseshoe Bend.

== Route description ==
State Highway 52 begins at the Oregon/Idaho state line at the terminus of Oregon Route 52 where the highway crosses the Snake River near Payette. The highway heads eastward through the city of Payette, then following the Payette River. The highway meets SH-72 at its junction east of New Plymouth. Then heads eastward to the city of Emmett where it turns north at its junction with SH-16 then continuing east up Black Canyon to its terminus at Horseshoe Bend.

== History ==
This route has been in existence since 1929, originally as part of State Highway 16, which originally terminated in Horseshoe Bend. State Highway 52 was created in 1938, when the northern section of SH-16 from Emmett to Horseshoe Bend was rerouted westward to New Plymouth. SH-16 was eventually truncated at Emmett in 1955, and SH-52 was then extended westward along the former SH-16 heading toward New Plymouth, and ending up in Payette and the state line.

== Major intersections ==
County	Location	mi	km	Destinations	Notes
Snake River		0.00	0.00	OR 52 north	Continuation into Oregon
Snake River		0.00	0.00	Payette Bridge; Oregon–Idaho state line	
Payette	Payette	1.664	2.678	US 95 Spur south – Fruitland	
Payette	Payette	2.327	3.745	US 95 – Weiser, Fruitland	
Payette		14.419	23.205	SH-72 west – New Plymouth	
Gem	Emmett	30.422	48.959	SH-16 south – Eagle	
Boise	Horseshoe Bend	54.126	87.107	SH-55 – Eagle, McCall	
1.000 mi = 1.609 km; 1.000 km = 0.621 mi

== See also ==
- List of highways numbered 52
