= North Fork Range =

Mountain range in Idaho

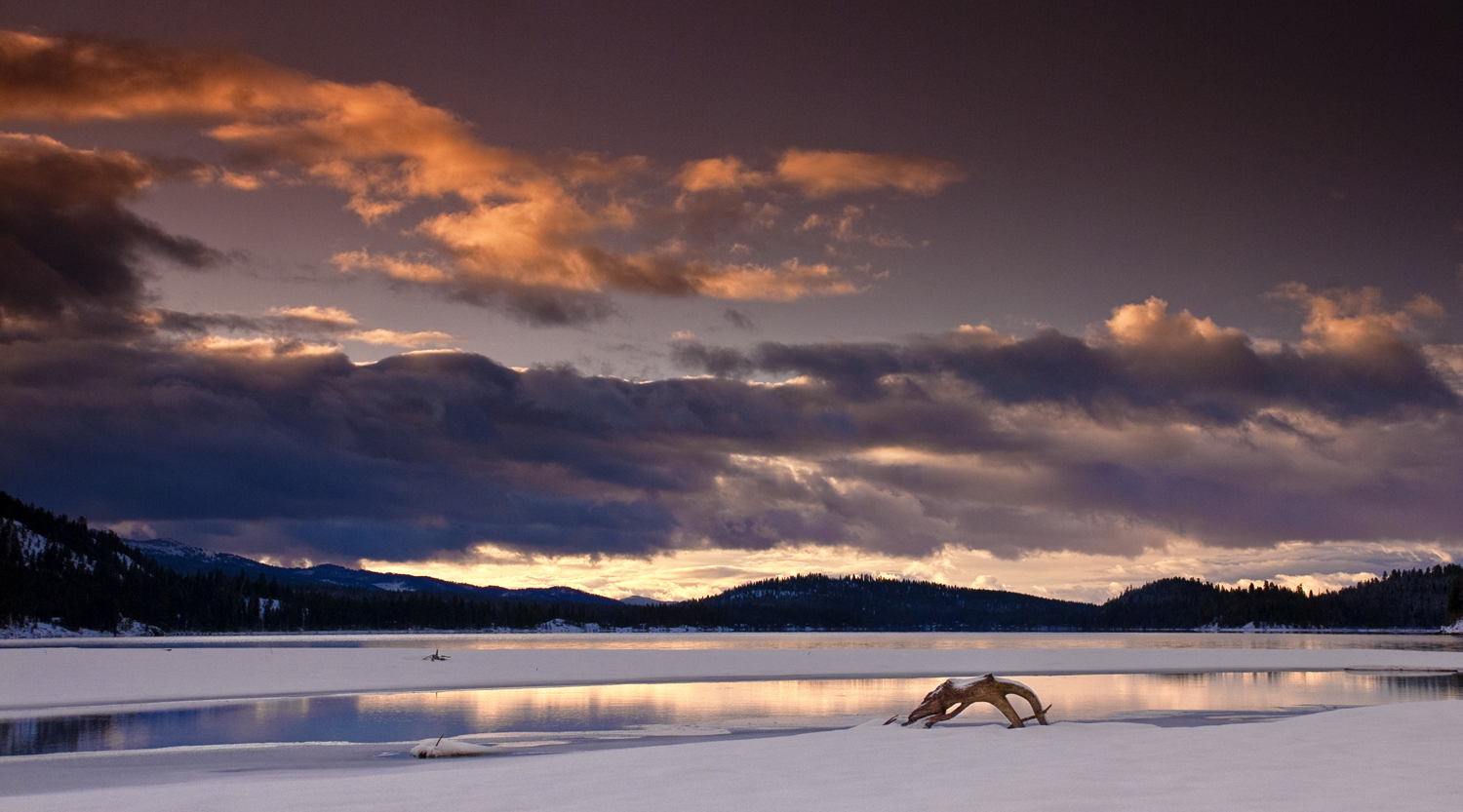
- North Payette Lake

Highest point
- Peak: East Mountain
- Elevation: 6,243 ft (1,903 m)
- Listing: Mountain ranges of Idaho
- Coordinates: 44°09′39″N 116°03′07″W

Dimensions
- Length: 40 mi (64 km) N/S

Geography
- Location within Idaho
- Country: United States
- State: Idaho
- Parent range: Rocky Mountains

The North Fork Range is a mountain range in western Idaho. The range makes up the southwestern part of the Salmon River Mountains, and is considered a sub-range. It is 40 miles (64 km) long and 10 miles (16 km) wide, and is best known for Cougar Rock, a dome-like formation within the range.

== Location ==
The range is located in the southwestern portions of the Salmon River Mountains. It is bordered by the North Fork Payette River and Warm Lake Highway. The range is located south of McCall and borders Lake Cascade.

== Notable peaks ==
Rank	Mountain Peak	Elevation	Prominence
1	East Mountain	7,748 feet (2,362 m)	1,608 feet (490 m)
2	Stolle Peak	7,565 feet (2,306 m)	905 feet (276 m)
3	Peak 7164	7,164 feet (2,184 m)	304 feet (93 m)
4	Packer John Mountain	7,100 feet (2,200 m)	1,520 feet (460 m)
5	Cougar Rock	7,060 feet (2,150 m)	120 feet (37 m)
6	Garden Mountain	7,005 feet (2,135 m)	905 feet (276 m)
7	Peak 3668	3,668 feet (1,118 m)	408 feet (124 m)

== See also ==
- Bear Mountains
