= Smith's Ferry =

Smith's Ferry may refer to:

- Smith's Ferry, California
- Smith's Ferry, Idaho, a community or hamlet in Valley County, Idaho
- Smith's Ferry, Massachusetts
- Glasgow, Pennsylvania, colloquially known as Smith's Ferry
