= Spring Valley Summit =

- Location within the United States Location within Idaho
- Elevation: 4,242 ft (1,293 m)
- Traversed by: SH-55

Third Approach
- Location: Boise County, Idaho, U.S.
- Range: Boise Range, Rocky Mountains
- Coordinates: 43.836°N 116.245°W

Spring Valley Summit is a mountain pass in the western United States in southwestern Idaho, at an elevation of 4,242 feet (1,293 m) above sea level. North of the city of Boise, it is traversed by State Highway 55, the Payette River Scenic Byway.

Located in southwestern Boise County, the summit is south of the city of Horseshoe Bend, 1,600 vertical feet (490 m) below. It marks the divide between the Payette River and Boise River drainage areas.

The new multi-lane grade of Highway 55 into Horseshoe Bend was completed in the fall of 1991; the old curvier road is to the west, long plagued by landslides and closures. Part of an ancient lake, dozens of springs fed water and undermined the roadway.

Of the major grades from Boise to north Idaho, it was the last to be improved. The other three, all on U.S. 95, were White Bird Hill (1975), Lapwai Canyon (1960), and Lewiston Hill (1977).

The north side of the summit is also known as Horseshoe Bend Hill.
