= North Fork Payette River =

River in western Idaho, United States

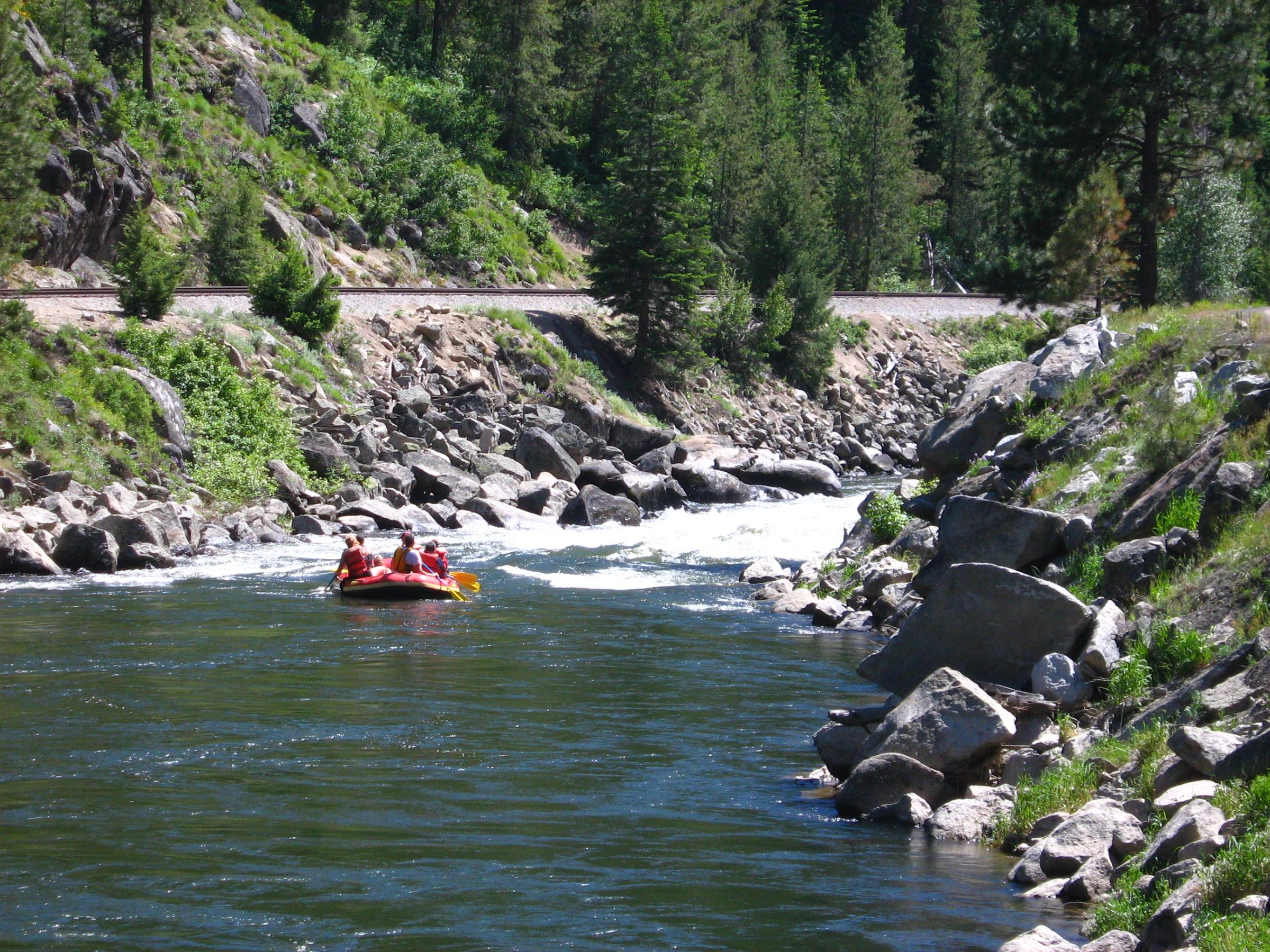
- Rafters running rapids on the Cabarton section of the North Fork above Smiths Ferry in 2008

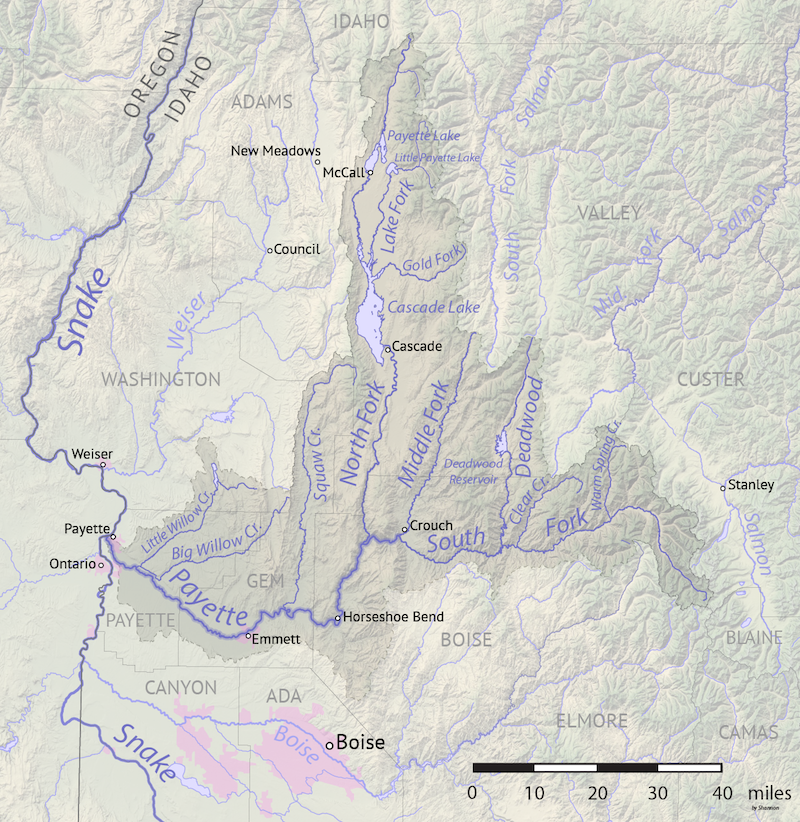
- Map of the Payette River watershed, including the North Fork

Location
- Country: United States
- State: Idaho
- Region: Valley County, Boise County
- Cities: McCall, Cascade, Banks

Physical characteristics
- Source: Confluence of Trail Creek and Cloochman Creek
  - location: Northwest of Diamond Ridge, Valley County
  - coordinates: 45°10′47″N 115°59′37″W
  - elevation: 6,083 ft (1,854 m)
- Mouth: Payette River
  - location: Banks, Boise County
  - coordinates: 44°05′06″N 116°06′57″W
  - elevation: 2,825 ft (861 m)
- Length: 113 mi (182 km), North-south
- Basin size: 912 sq mi (2,360 km^{2})
- Discharge
  - location: Banks, ID
  - average: 1,299 cu ft/s (36.8 m^{3}/s)
  - minimum: 36 cu ft/s (1.0 m^{3}/s)
  - maximum: 8,830 cu ft/s (250 m^{3}/s)

Basin features
- River system: Snake River watershed
- Tributaries
  - left: Lake Fork (Idaho), Clear Creek (Idaho), Round Valley Creek

The North Fork Payette River (/peɪˈɛt/) is a river in the western United States in western Idaho. It flows about 113 miles (182 km) southwards from the Salmon River Mountains to near Banks, where it empties into the Payette River, a tributary of the Snake River. It drains a watershed of 912 square miles (2,360 km^{2}), consisting of mountains and forests, and valleys filled with large lakes and wetlands.

== Course ==
It rises at the confluence of Trail Creek and Cloochman Creek, in a meadow in the Payette National Forest in Valley County. The river flows south into Upper Payette Lake, then further south through a narrow valley into Payette Lake, with a surface elevation of 4,990 feet (1,520 m) above sea level. The river exits from the southwestern corner of the lake at McCall and flows southwards through Long Valley into Lake Cascade, a large reservoir formed by Cascade Dam. The Lake Fork and Gold Fork rivers join from the north and east sides of the lake.

About five miles (8 km) below the Cascade Dam and the town of Cascade, the North Fork reaches the end of Long Valley and enters a narrow canyon along the western side of the North Fork Range in the Boise National Forest. Paralleled by State Highway 55, it crosses into Boise County, where the canyon's depth exceeds 2,500 feet (760 m).

The North Fork joins with the Payette River at Banks (2,825 feet (860 m)). From there, the Payette River flows 62 miles (100 km) further west to its confluence with the Snake River at Payette, just northeast of Ontario, Oregon.

== See also ==
- Columbia River
- List of rivers of Idaho
- List of longest streams of Idaho
