= Ramon Rogers =

American serial killer

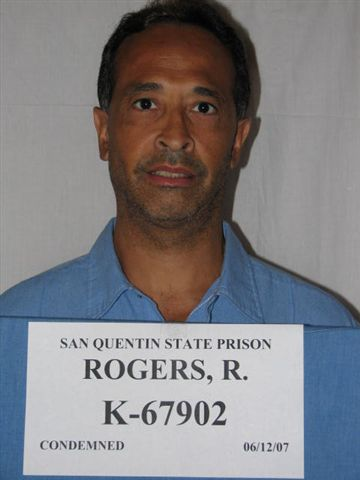
- Born: Ramon Jay Franks; March 13, 1960 (age 66); Emmett, Idaho, U.S.
- Other name: "Raymond"
- Convictions: Albano and Toronczak: First-degree murder with special circumstances x2 Stadt: Second-degree murder
- Penalty: Albano and Toronczak: Death; Stadt: 15 years to life

Details
- Victims: 3–4
- Span of crimes: 1993 – 1996 (confirmed)
- Country: United States
- States: California, possibly Idaho
- Date apprehended: March 11, 1996

Ramon Jay Rogers (né Franks; born March 13, 1960) is an American serial killer and former actor who murdered a male friend and two ex-girlfriends in San Diego, California between 1993 and 1996, dismembering their bodies post-mortem. Convicted on two counts of first-degree murder and one count of second-degree murder, he was later sentenced to death.

== Early life ==
Ramon Jay Franks was born on March 13, 1960, in Emmett, Idaho, the son of a white American father and a black mother who immigrated from Trinidad and Tobago. As his birth parents were unable to take care of him due to financial constraints, the young Ramon was adopted by the Rogers family. According to friends and relatives, the two families got along well and often visited one another, and Ramon grew up in a well-adjusted and respectable environment.

In high school, Rogers was known for competing in various sports and was well-regarded by classmates. After graduation, he enlisted in Navy and served until 1982. During his tenure there, he met and befriended Ronald "Ron" Stadt. Upon completion of their service, the two men moved to San Diego, California, where they rented an apartment and lived together as roommates.

Throughout the remainder of the 1980s and the early 1990s, Rogers did a variety of jobs, ranging from working as a reserve sheriff's deputy to being a movie extra for the TV show Renegade and the local Crime Stoppers branch, playing small parts such as prisoners, murderers and other types of criminals. Aside from this, Rogers also ran a car window tinting business, a cellular phone service, was the apartment manager of a building at 7007 Saranac. In the mid-1990s, he attempted to join a heavy metal band named Mister Butterfly as their drummer.

== Murders ==
=== Ron Stadt ===
In July 1992, Rogers' best friend Ron Stadt divorced from his wife Debra, and the pair soon after got into a custody dispute over who would get parental rights over their child. In April or May 1993, Stadt discovered that his ex-wife had been having an affair with Rogers while they were still married, which he planned to present as evidence in his upcoming custody dispute trial.

On June 24, 1993, Stadt was at work when he received a phone call from Rogers, with whom he got into an argument. A colleague of Stadt's, Michael Proo, later claimed at trial that Stadt wanted to retrieve some jewelry from the apartment which they shared, but was afraid that Rogers might try something if he went alone, so he asked Proo and his wife to accompany him. However, they declined, and after finishing his work shift, Stadt went to Rogers' apartment. He was last seen alive at 6:20 PM that night by his ex-wife, who had seen him driving his truck into an alleyway behind the Saranac apartments, closely followed by Rogers. Debra Stadt said that when he saw her, Rogers urgently told her to go away, which she did. Stadt was never seen alive after this.

On the following day, Debra asked Rogers why he was with Ron if they were not on good terms, to which he replied that Ron was there to pick up a ladder. However, on July 2, when he was interviewed by a detective from Imperial Beach, he claimed that Ron was there to pick up jewelry. While he was not arrested for his disappearance at the time, Debra and several friends of Rogers later claimed that he frequently changed his explanations about why Ron was missing, ranging from unwillingness to pay child support to "riding off into the sunset". Rogers apparently kept his car keys and a radar detector, and even called two acquaintances on the phone through numbers he was never given, but both had given to Ron Stadt.

=== Rose Albano ===
In late 1993, Rogers learned that an ex-girlfriend of his, 33-year-old Filipino Rose Albano, had become pregnant with his child. Unwilling to take care of either this child or her two other children, he demanded that Albano have an abortion and move out of his apartment, but she adamantly refused to do either.

Albano was last seen alive by her parents on December 18, and five days later, Rogers reported her missing to the San Diego Police Department. In the phone call, he claimed to have last seen her on December 12, mentioning that she was pregnant and possibly carrying $6,400 on her. In a second call to the police department, Rogers gave a different address and claimed to have seen her on December 21.

According to friends, Rogers seemed unconcerned that Albano had gone missing and gave different explanations as to where she had gone. He alternated between claiming that she had gone to Los Angeles; to see her sister; that she and Stadt were shopping in Mexico; that she went shopping and never returned; that she might have returned to her native Philippines or moved away for a new secretarial job.

On December 29, Albano's arm, leg and lower jaw were found inside a trash bag near Valley Center, about a mile and a half away from Rogers' house. Rogers told his sister that Albano's mother had told him that the police had found Albano's remains that same day, but the police department itself did not inform her parents until January.

Due to the fact that Albano had withdrawn money from her retirement account that corresponded with the amount of money Rogers had recently used to purchase new tires for his truck, he was deemed a possible suspect and interrogated in March 1994. Not long after, Rogers contacted a female friend and handed over some of his personal belongings and his girlfriend's passport, supposedly because he was afraid that the police would suspect that he was attempting to flee.

=== Beatrice Toronczak ===
In the early 1990s, Rogers had a son with 32-year-old Polish immigrant Biata "Beatrice" Toronczak, but the couple lived apart, with Toronczak raising their son in her native Poland. In late 1995, Rogers, who was determined to bring his son back to the United States, traveled to Warsaw and brought him back to San Diego on January 3, 1996. Toronczak arrived on February 11 and moved into his apartment, forcing Rogers to move out his new girlfriend to another apartment because she did not want her around their son.

Toronczak was last seen alive shortly before her birthday on February 18, 1996. When asked about her whereabouts, Rogers gave different explanations, ranging from her running off with a Mexican man over the border or going to Germany or Las Vegas. He was reportedly unconcerned with the sudden disappearance, as he refused to file a police report and told her mother that everything would be fine. Prior to her disappearance, Toronczak had confided to her mother that on at least one occasion, an angry Rogers had locked her in a storage unit after an argument.

== Arrest and investigation ==
On March 11, 1996, Toronczak's relatives filed a missing persons report, and officers from the San Diego Police Department went to Rogers apartment to investigate. Initially, he was detained on suspicion of drug possession, but after searching three storage units underneath his apartment building, officers found numerous pieces of evidence indicating a murder had taken place. Among these items included a tote bag containing Toronczak's driver's license and personal items; a yellow bucket containing what appeared to be human teeth and severed fingers; torn female clothing; bloodstaind flex cuffs and a piece of cardboard; a butcher knife; a claw hammer with red stains; a bloodstained blue tarp; a bloodstained handsaw; a 4x4 and two pairs of branch clippers, one of which had red stains. The most important piece of evidence found was a pair of yellow Playtex gloves and portions of a calendar with dates corresponding to the disappearances of Stadt and Albano cut off.

Not long after, Rogers was charged with Toronczak's murder after analyses concluded that the contents found in the yellow bucket were Toronczak's teeth and severed fingers. The following month, he was also charged with the murders of Stadt and Albano after investigators uncovered additional evidence linking him to their cases.

=== Idaho investigations ===
While investigating Rogers for the California cases, he was also briefly investigated for the disappearance of 28-year-old Marie Watson, a neighbor of his who disappeared in 1977 from her home in Emmett, Idaho. At the time, Watson was known to be in some sort of dispute with the Rogers family, who were considered suspects in the case, but were never charged as no body was ever found.

At the time of her disappearance, Rogers was only 17 years old and still in high school. As there was no conclusive evidence pointing to his involvement in Watson's disappearance, he has never been charged in this case.

=== Trial and sentence ===
In September 1996, Rogers was ordered to stand trial over the objections of his defense attorney, who claimed that the prosecution had failed to provide enough evidence that the victims were deceased and demanded that all murder charges be dropped. During the trial, the prosecution displayed numerous pieces of evidence obtained from searching Rogers' property, including the bloodied utility tools and colored photographs of the victims' dismembered remains. Throughout the remainder of the trial, Rogers remained stoic and took notes as the proceedings went on.

In June 1997, Rogers was convicted for the three murders, with the jury finding him guilty on two counts of first-degree murders for the murders of Albano and Toronczak, and one count of second-degree murder for Stadt's murder. He was subsequently sentenced to death, and despite filing multiple appeals challenging this sentence, it was upheld by the Supreme Court of California in 2009.

== Aftermath ==
As of July 2024, Rogers remains on death row.

In 2022, Judge Frederick Link, who presided over Rogers' trial, retired from his duties. In an interview with KFMB-TV about his career, Link mentioned cases that left an impact on his career, one of them being the Rogers case, as it was one of only three death penalty cases he presided over in his 40-year career.

== See also ==
- Capital punishment in California
- List of death row inmates in the United States § California
- List of serial killers in the United States
