= Firebird Raceway =

- U.S. National Register of Historic Places
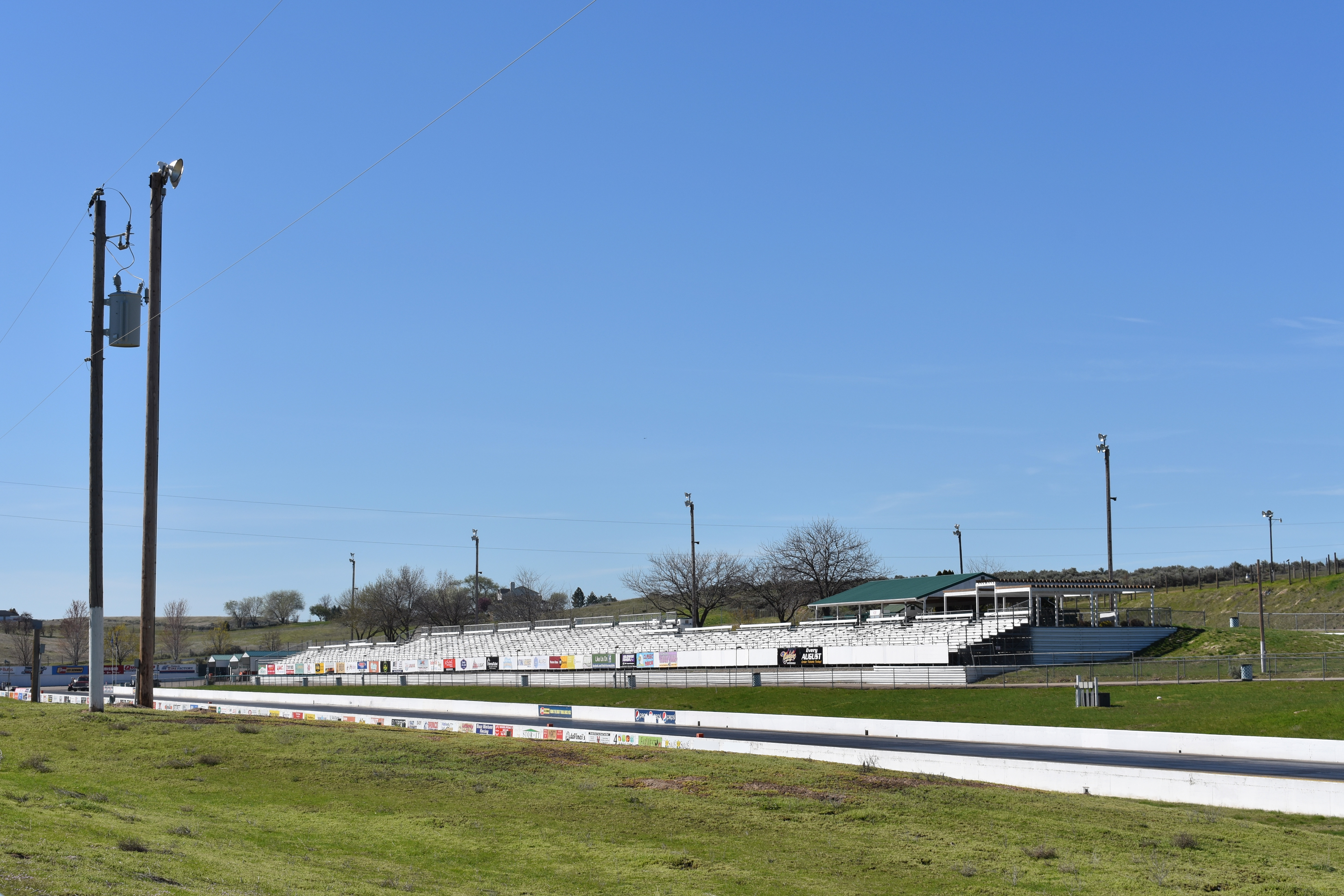
- Firebird Raceway in 2019

- Location within Idaho Location within the United States
- Location: 8551 Hwy 16, Eagle, Idaho
- Coordinates: 43.767°N 116.469°W
- Area: 60 acres (24 ha)
- Built: 1968
- Built by: Bill New
- NRHP reference No.: 100003243
- Added to NRHP: December 24, 2018

Firebird Raceway is a motorsport racing venue in the western United States, near Eagle, Idaho, in the Boise metropolitan area. The raceway opened 58 years ago in 1968 under management of racing enthusiasts Bill and Ellanor New, and it has remained under ownership of the New family.

A longstanding member track of the National Hot Rod Association (NHRA), the raceway has been named NHRA Track of the Year three times. It was added to the National Register of Historic Places in 2018, the first dragstrip to be included on the register.

Just west of Highway 16 between Star and Emmett, the elevation is approximately 2,700 feet (825 m) above sea level.

== History ==
Firebird Raceway was incorporated on May 11, 1968, by Ronald Ashley, J.S. Chapman, and J.W. Korn. Bob Riggle and his Hurst Hemi Under Glass were featured on opening day, July 28, 1968.

In 1969, the raceway hosted one of six Northwest Regional World Championship drag meets. Later that year the raceway hosted the first annual Nitromethane Invitational Championship, a Top Fuel event.

The annual NAPA Auto Parts Ignitor competition began in 1971, and the Pepsi Nightfire Nationals began in 1972.

Director Don Almeido's documentary, Firebird Raceway 35th Annual Pepsi Nightfire Nationals, was released in 2007.
