= E B Meyer Inc. =

Pest control manufacturer in Idaho, U.S.

Ed Meyer, Inc.
- Type: Private
- Industry: Pest Control Systems
- Founded: July 2001
- Founder: Ed Meyer
- Headquarters: Emmett, ID, United States
- Area served: Worldwide
- Key people: 4
- Products: Rodenator R1; Rodenator R2; Rodenator R3
- Number of employees: 15 (2010)
- Website: www.rodenator.com

E B Meyer Inc., also called E B Meyer Inc. dba Meyer Industries, is a U.S. private manufacturing firm located in a small town in Emmett, Idaho that produces Pest Control device called the Rodenator.

== History ==
Meyer Industries established in 2001, the firm has adapted to growth in the global market and today helps businesses export and import. The company exports 55 percent of its products outside United States even though the company started export its products in 2004.

== Current Product ==
The Rodenator is an applicable device that injects a precise mixture of oxygen and propane into the dens of burrowing rodents, and kills them with a concussive force that collapses the rodents' tunnel system as well. The company produces three Rodenator models: Rodenator R1, Rodenator R2, and Rodenator R3.

== Awards ==
2006: U.S. Small Business Administration’s (SBA) 2006 Small Business Exporter of the Year.

2007: Stoel Rives Innovation Award for Agriculture/Environmental.

2008: Idaho Business Review (IBR) Accomplished Under 40 Honoree.

2009: United States Commercial Service (CS) Exporter of the Year Award for 2009 in the Agricultural Category.
