= Catholic Church of the Sacred Heart (Emmett, Idaho) =

- U.S. National Register of Historic Places
- Location within Idaho Location within the United States
- Location: 1st St., Emmett, Idaho
- Coordinates: 43°52′27″N 116°29′51″W
- Built: 1928
- Architect: Tourtellotte & Hummel
- Architectural style: Mission Revival
- MPS: Early Churches of Emmett TR
- NRHP reference No.: 80001323
- Added to NRHP: December 3, 1980

The Catholic Church of the Sacred Heart, on First Street in Emmett, Idaho, was listed on the National Register of Historic Places in 1980.

It was designed by architects Tourtellotte & Hummel in Mission Revival style.

Its front facade has a gabled roof, a baroque-curved bell tower, a round-arched entrance, and "stucco fabric enriched with wrought-iron ornament." It was built in 1928 with a 35 by 50 feet (11 m × 15 m) nave and a 12 by 38 feet (3.7 m × 11.6 m) sanctuary and sacristy offset at the rear. It was modified with additions in 1977.

It is located on First Street at Hayes Avenue, directly across from the First Baptist Church of Emmett.

It is one of six churches within a two block area of Emmett, established there from 1906 to 1934, which were together studied and proposed for listing on the National Register. The six are: Catholic Church of the Sacred Heart (Emmett, Idaho), Emmett Presbyterian Church, First Baptist Church of Emmett, Methodist Episcopal Church (Emmett, Idaho), and St. Mary's Episcopal Church (Emmett, Idaho), which were all listed in 1980, and the First Full Gospel/United Pentecostal Church, which was not listed.
