= Oregon Route 52 =

State highway in eastern Oregon, US

Oregon Route 52
- Route 52 highlighted in red

Route information
- Maintained by ODOT
- Length: 1.65 mi (2.66 km)
- Existed: 1952–present

Major junctions
- West end: OR 201 at Payette Junction
- East end: SH-52 near Payette, Idaho

Location
- Country: United States
- State: Oregon

Highway system
- Oregon Highways; Interstate; US; State; Named; Scenic
← OR 51	→ OR 53

Oregon Route 52 (OR 52) is a very short Oregon state highway that runs from OR 201 at Payette Junction, Oregon, to the Snake River (the Idaho state line) at Payette, Idaho. It is a continuation of ID 52 and was once signed as Oregon Route 90. OR 52 consists of the Payette Spur No. 492 (see Oregon highways and routes).

== Route description ==
OR 52 begins at an intersection with OR 201 at Payette Junction and continues south to the Idaho state line at Payette, Idaho, where it continues as ID 52.

== History ==
The Payette Spur was designated OR 90 in 1932 and renumbered OR 52 in 1952.

== Major intersections ==
The entire route is in Malheur County.

Location	mi	km	Destinations	Notes
	19.65	31.62	OR 201 – Weiser, Baker City, Ontario	
Snake River	21.23– 21.30	34.17– 34.28	Payette Bridge; Oregon–Idaho state line	
Snake River	21.23– 21.30	34.17– 34.28	SH-52 east – Payette	Continuation into Idaho
1.000 mi = 1.609 km; 1.000 km = 0.621 mi
