= Methodist Episcopal Church (Emmett, Idaho) =

- U.S. National Register of Historic Places
- Location within Idaho Location within the United States
- Location: 132 S. Washington Ave., Emmett, Idaho
- Coordinates: 43°52′29″N 116°29′55″W
- Area: less than one acre
- Built: 1906, 1920
- Architectural style: Late Gothic Revival
- MPS: Early Churches of Emmett TR
- NRHP reference No.: 80001326
- Added to NRHP: December 3, 1980

The Methodist Episcopal Church in Emmett, Idaho, was built in 1906. It was listed on the National Register of Historic Places in 1980.

It has also been known as the United Methodist Church. It was located at 132 S. Washington Ave, at 1st St., in Emmett. The building no longer exists; a modern True Value Hardware store is now at that address.

It was built in 1906 in a cross-shaped plan, and it was expanded in 1920. Its original section was built of buff-colored brick, as was the later. The original section had more consistent use of Gothic Revival styling, in its "sharply pointed arches" for all openings.

It is one of six churches within a two block area of Emmett, established there from 1906 to 1934, which were together studied proposed for listing on the National Register. The six are: Catholic Church of the Sacred Heart (Emmett, Idaho), Emmett Presbyterian Church, First Baptist Church of Emmett, Methodist Episcopal Church (Emmett, Idaho), and St. Mary's Episcopal Church (Emmett, Idaho), which were all listed in 1980, and the First Full Gospel/United Pentecostal Church, which was not listed.
