= St. Mary's Episcopal Church (Emmett, Idaho) =

- U.S. National Register of Historic Places
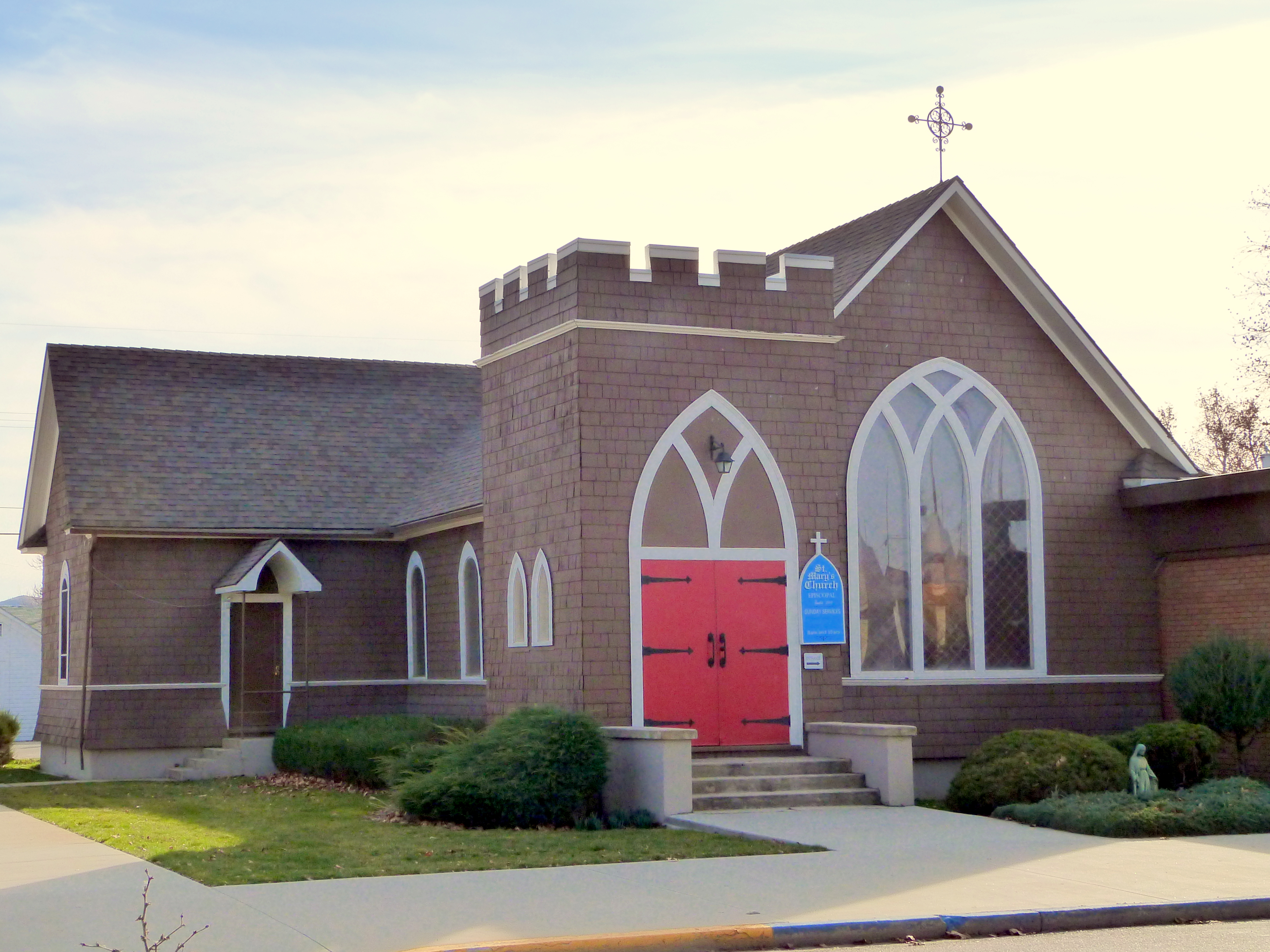

- Location within Idaho Location within the United States
- Location: 219 E. 1st St., Emmett, Idaho
- Coordinates: 43°52′28″N 116°29′51″W
- Area: less than one acre
- Built: 1886
- Architectural style: Late Gothic Revival
- MPS: Early Churches of Emmett TR
- NRHP reference No.: 80001327
- Added to NRHP: December 3, 1980

The St. Mary's Episcopal Church, on 1st St. in Emmett, Idaho, was listed on the National Register of Historic Places in 1980.

== History ==
The church was completed in 1886, at First Street and Boise Avenue in Emmett. It was dedicated by pioneer Bishop of Idaho Daniel S. Tuttle.

The main block of the church, a gabled, wood-frame structure, was moved to its current location, on the southwest corner of First Street and Wardwell Avenue, in 1928.

== Design ==
The church is L-shaped and faces north onto First Street. The main block contains its nave. A smaller gabled ell contains the sacristy and extends toward Wardwell Avenue at the left rear. At the left front of the church is a crenellated tower. The church also has a half-hexagonal apse at the back of the nave.

Its present appearance, which is Gothic Revival, was created in 1928.

It was deemed "architecturally significant as a pleasing local example of a twentieth-century picturesque style. Along with the Mission Revival Catholic Church up the block, which was completed in the same year, the Episcopal Church is in broad stylistic tradition which particularly values the nostalgic associations buildings can evoke. In this case the associations (necessarily vague) which are evoked by the low and cozy massing, the rustic shingle siding, the determinedly "gothic" fenestration and the picturesque tower and apse, are probably with the English country church, from which small Episcopal churches in America may legitimately see themselves descended. (St. Michael's Cathedral in Boise, the seat of the Idaho Episcopal Diocese, is identically massed, rendered in stone over which picturesque ivy was early trained.)"

== Location ==
It is one of six churches within a two block area of Emmett, established there from 1906 to 1934, which were together studied and proposed for listing on the National Register. The six are: Catholic Church of the Sacred Heart (Emmett, Idaho), Emmett Presbyterian Church, First Baptist Church of Emmett, Methodist Episcopal Church (Emmett, Idaho), and St. Mary's Episcopal Church (Emmett, Idaho), which were all listed in 1980, and the First Full Gospel/United Pentecostal Church, which was not listed.
