= First Baptist Church of Emmett =

- U.S. National Register of Historic Places
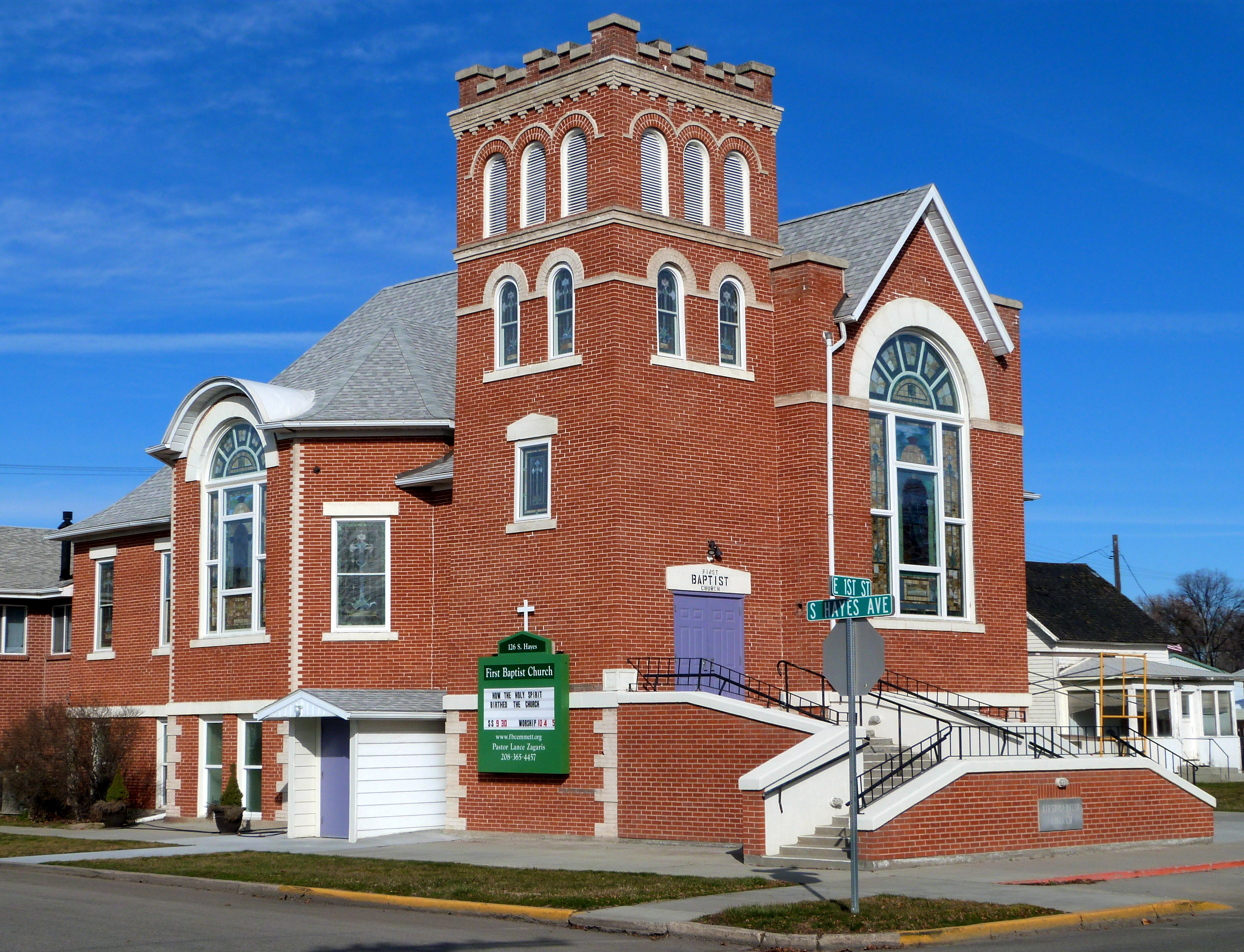

- Location within Idaho
- Location: 126 S. Hayes Ave., Emmett, Idaho
- Coordinates: 43°52′29″N 116°29′54″W
- Built: 1915
- Architect: Nisbet & Paradice
- Architectural style: Italianate
- MPS: Emmett Churches Thematic Resources
- NRHP reference No.: 80001325
- Added to NRHP: December 3, 1980

The First Baptist Church of Emmett, at the northeast corner of 1st St. and Hayes Ave. in Emmett, Idaho, was built in 1915. It was listed on the National Register of Historic Places in 1980.

The church faces south onto 1st St. It has "Italianesque round arches and an accompanying Renaissance flavor" and was designed by architects Nisbet & Paradice. The nomination document describes its exterior as "imposing", and goes on:

The interior, with its belled walls, curving pews and excellent stained glass, is one of the finest—perhaps the finest at this scale—and most original in Idaho. The church is notable for its status as the only commission so far as is presently known of a Boise architectural office then of some importance Nisbet and Paradice. This elaborate local church was begun during a prosperous period in 1909, and not dedicated until 1915 or completely finished until still later. It kept its congregation in financial straits until 1924, but it was finished nonetheless.

It is one of six churches within a two block area of Emmett, established there from 1906 to 1934, which were together studied proposed for listing on the National Register. The six are: Catholic Church of the Sacred Heart (Emmett, Idaho), Emmett Presbyterian Church, First Baptist Church of Emmett, Methodist Episcopal Church (Emmett, Idaho), and St. Mary's Episcopal Church (Emmett, Idaho), which were all listed in 1980, and the First Full Gospel/United Pentecostal Church, which was not listed.
