= Payette Junction, Oregon =

Unincorporated community in the state of Oregon, United States

- Unincorporated community
- Location within Oregon Location within the United States
- Coordinates: 44°07′10″N 116°56′39″W
- Country: United States
- State: Oregon
- County: Malheur
- Elevation: 2,146 ft (654 m)
- Time zone: UTC-7 (Mountain (MST))
  - Summer (DST): UTC-6 (MDT)
- Area code: 541
- GNIS feature ID: 1129765

Payette Junction is a highway junction and former unincorporated community in Malheur County, Oregon, United States. It lies at the intersection of Oregon Route 52 and Oregon Route 201 between Ontario, Oregon, and Weiser, Idaho. It is about a mile from Payette, Idaho, on the other side of the Snake River, which marks the Oregon–Idaho border in this vicinity.
