= Emmett Presbyterian Church =

Historic church in Idaho, United States

- The Word Church of Emmett
- U.S. National Register of Historic Places
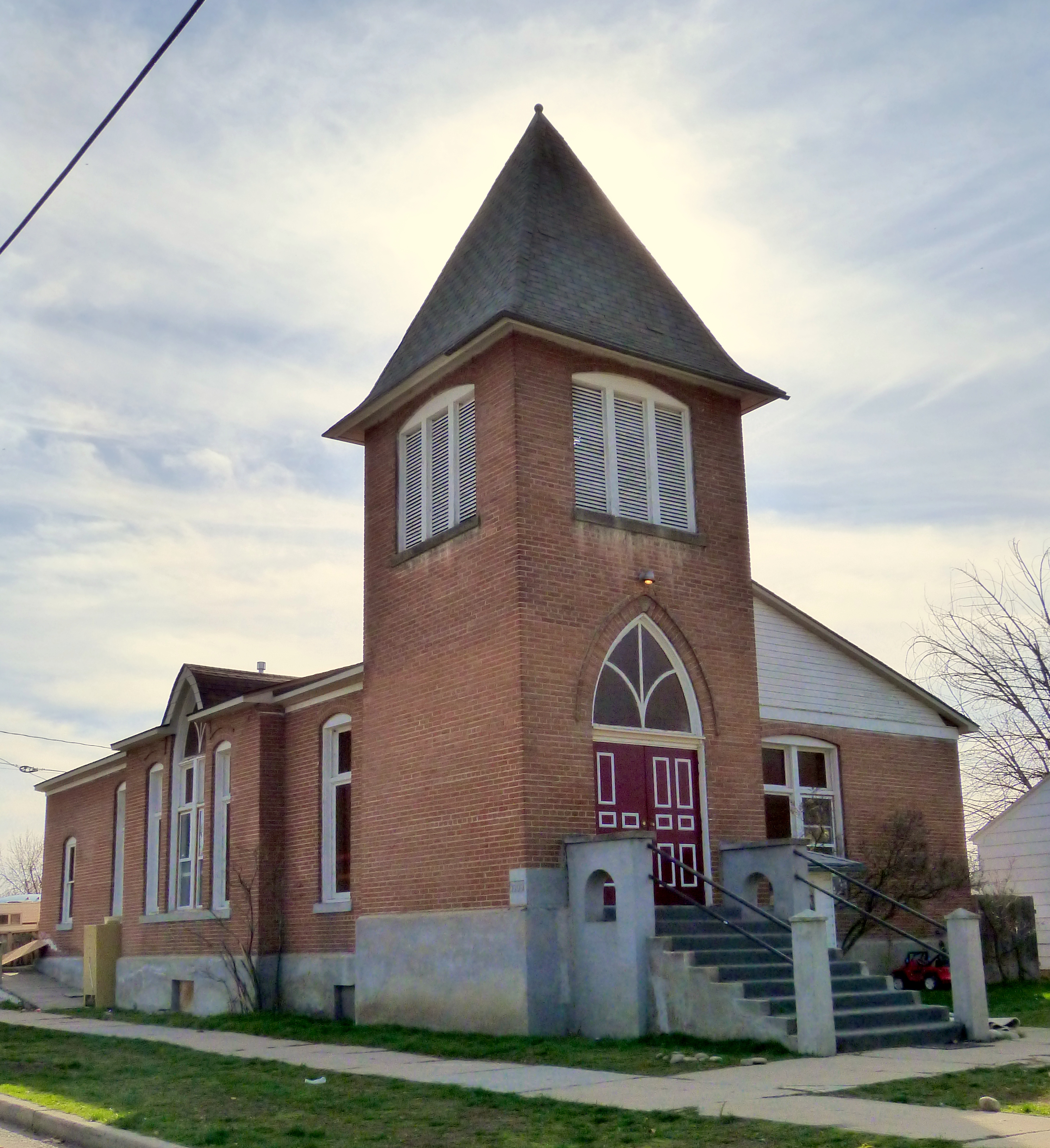

- Location within Idaho Location within the United States
- Location: 2nd St., Emmett, Idaho
- Coordinates: 43°52′24″N 116°29′51″W
- Area: less than one acre
- Built: 1909
- Architectural style: Late Gothic Revival
- MPS: Early Churches of Emmett TR
- NRHP reference No.: 80001324
- Added to NRHP: December 3, 1980

The Emmett Presbyterian Church, also known as Emmett First Southern Baptist Church, is a historic formerly Presbyterian church building at 2nd Street in Emmett, Idaho. It was started in 1909 in a late-Gothic Revival style and was added to the National Register of Historic Places in 1980.

It was the first church building of the Emmett Presbyterian Church, which was founded in 1906. It is a red brick building on a concrete foundation. Its roof is hipped at the rear and is jerkin-headed over a clapboard gable on the front. It has an entry tower with a steep pyramidal cap at the left front.

In 1979 it was owned by the Southern Baptist congregation.

It is one of six churches within a two block area of Emmett, established there from 1906 to 1934, which were together studied proposed for listing on the National Register. The six are: Catholic Church of the Sacred Heart (Emmett, Idaho), Emmett Presbyterian Church, First Baptist Church of Emmett, Methodist Episcopal Church (Emmett, Idaho), and St. Mary's Episcopal Church (Emmett, Idaho), which were all listed in 1980, and the First Full Gospel/United Pentecostal Church, which was not listed.
