= Idaho State Arboretum =

Arboretum in Pocatello, Idaho, U.S.

Coordinates: 42.8613°N 112.4340°W

- Interactive map of Idaho State Arboretum
- Website: Official website

The Idaho State Arboretum is an arboretum located adjacent to the campus of the Idaho State University, Pocatello, Idaho, United States. The arboretum, founded in 1982, is open to the public daily without charge and includes an organized tree walk. In 2025, HGTV called it "the most gorgeous garden in Idaho".

== Exhibits ==
Trees and shrubs in the arboretum include:

- Acer glabrum
- Acer negundo
- Aesculus hippocastanum
- Berberis thunbergii
- Betula pendula var. dalecarlica
- Buddleja davidii
- Celtis occidentalis
- Cercis canadensis
- Cercocarpus ledifolius
- Crataegus oxyacantha
- Forsythia intermedia
- Fraxinus pennsylvanica
- Juglans nigra
- Kolkwitzia amabilis
- Lonicera tatarica
- Magnolia stellata
- Mahonia aquifolium
- Malus spectablis
- Philadelphus lewisii
- Picea abies
- Pinus edulis
- Picea pungens
- Pinus mugo
- Pinus nigra
- Pinus sylvestri
- Populus tremuloides
- Potentilla fruticosa
- Prunus cerasifera
- Prunus virginiana
- Pyrus calleryana var. Bradford
- Quercus robur var. fastigiata
- Salix blanda
- Syringa
- Taxus x media
- Thuja orientalis
- Ulmus americana
- Ulmus glabra var. camperdownii
- Ulmus pumila
- Viburnum opulus

== See also ==
- List of botanical gardens in the United States
