= Smith's Ferry, California =

19th century ferry in California, U.S.

Coordinates: 36.5842°N 119.4585°W

Smith's Ferry was a ferry near Reedley, California. The ferry was usable year-round and was preferred by customers over Pool's Ferry because it had better services and a superior ferry boat. An 11-room hotel was also located at the site. It was located at the southwest edge of Reedley. It was founded by James Smith in 1855 and disestablished in 1874.
