= Arboretum Park =

Arboretum in Eagle, Idaho

Coordinates: 43°41′44″N 116°21′00″W

Arboretum Park is a small arboretum located at 312 E. State Street, Eagle, Idaho, United States. It contains 37 types of trees, as well as roses, perennials, native plants, and ground covers. All are identified by name stakes identifying the scientific and common names.

== See also ==
- List of parks in Boise
- List of botanical gardens in the United States
