= Payette River =

River in Idaho

Payette River South Fork Payette River
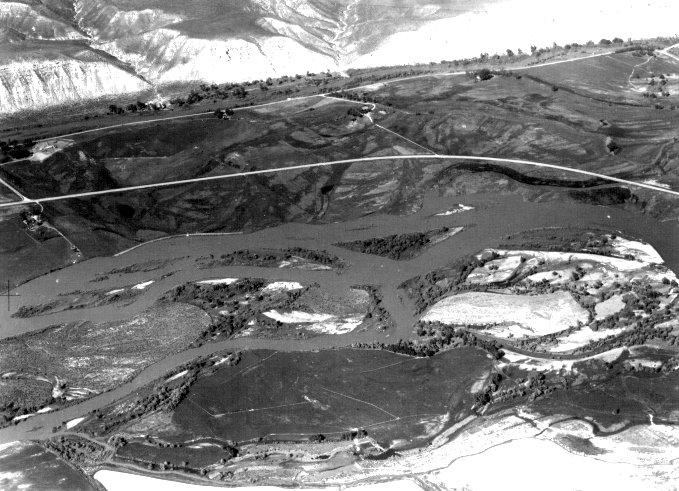
- The lower course of the Payette River

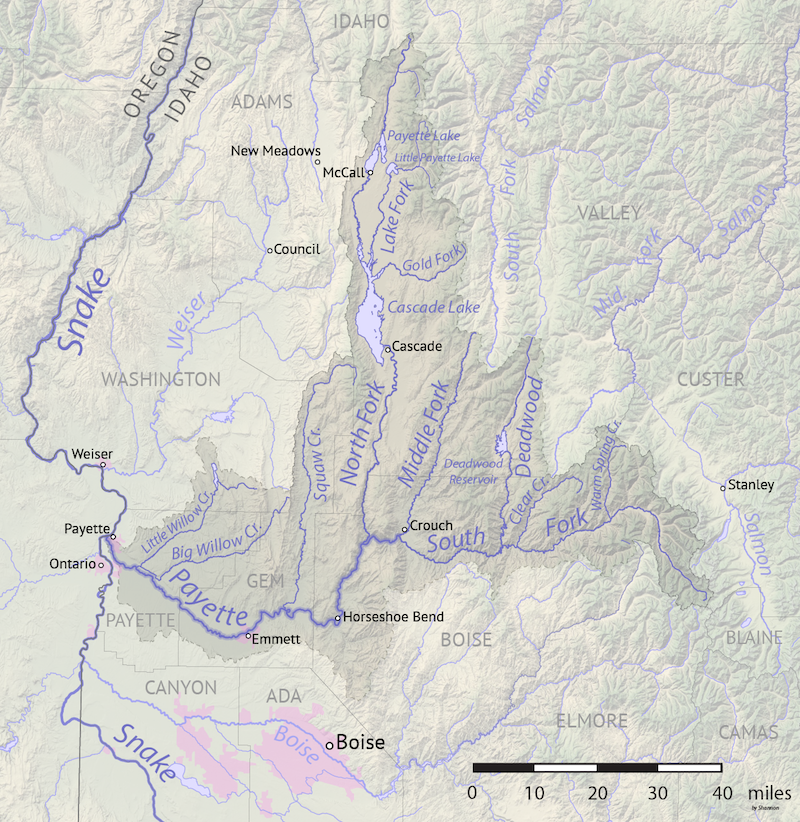
- Map of the Payette River watershed

Location
- Country: United States
- State: Idaho
- Region: Payette County
- City: Emmett

Physical characteristics
- Source: North Fork Payette River
  - location: Deep Lake, Boise County
  - coordinates: 45°10′47″N 115°59′37″W
  - elevation: 7,380 ft (2,250 m)
- 2nd source: South Fork Payette River
  - location: A small unnamed lake near Vernon Lake, Boise County
  - coordinates: 43°57′51″N 115°00′02″W
  - elevation: 8,820 ft (2,690 m)
- Source confluence: Near Banks
  - location: Payette County
  - coordinates: 44°05′04″N 116°06′54″W
  - elevation: 2,790 ft (850 m)
- Mouth: Snake River
  - location: Payette, Payette County
  - coordinates: 44°05′32″N 116°57′09″W
  - elevation: 2,125 ft (648 m)
- Length: 83 mi (134 km), East-West
- Basin size: 3,240 sq mi (8,400 km^{2})
- Discharge
  - average: 2,803 cu ft/s (79.4 m^{3}/s)
  - maximum: 32,000 cu ft/s (910 m^{3}/s)

Basin features
- River system: Snake River
- Tributaries
  - left: South Fork Payette River
  - right: North Fork Payette River, Big Willow Creek

The Payette River (/peɪˈɛt/) is an 82.7-mile-long (133.1 km) river in southwestern Idaho and a major tributary of the Snake River.

Its headwaters originate in the Sawtooth and Salmon River Mountains at elevations over 10,000 feet (3,000 m). Drainage in the watershed flows primarily from east to west, with the cumulative stream length to the head of the North Fork Payette River being 180 miles (290 km), while to the head of the South Fork the cumulative length is nearly 163 miles (262 km). The combined Payette River flows into an agricultural valley and empties into the Snake River near the city of Payette at an elevation of 2,125 feet (648 m). The Payette River's drainage basin comprises about 3,240 square miles (8,400 km^{2}). It is a physiographic section of the Columbia Plateau province, which in turn is part of the larger Intermontane Plateaus physiographic division. The South Fork of the Payette has its headwaters in the Sawtooth Wilderness, which is part of the Sawtooth National Recreation Area.

== Geography ==
The principal tributaries of the Payette River are the North and South Forks. The North Fork drains about 950 square miles (2,500 km^{2}), beginning north of McCall and flowing into Payette Lake. The North Fork exits at the southwest end of Payette Lake at 4,990 feet (1,520 m) and flows south in the "Long Valley" of Valley County toward Cascade. It then flows into the Cascade Reservoir, then continues south, accompanied by Highway 55.

The South Fork Payette River drains about 1,200 square miles (3,100 km^{2}), originating on the west side of the Sawtooth Wilderness beneath the 10,211-foot (3,112 m) Mount Payette. It flows past Grandjean and down to Lowman, along Highway 21. The shorter Middle Fork Payette River parallels the lower North Fork 10 miles (16 km) to the east, flowing south and joining the South Fork just southwest of Crouch. Further east, the Deadwood River parallels the Middle Fork and empties into the South Fork just west of Lowman. The main stem of the Payette River is shown on USGS topographic maps as beginning at the confluence of the South and Middle forks.

The North Fork joins the Payette at the village of Banks, at an elevation of 2,790 feet (850 m). The main stem flows south from Banks for 15 miles (24 km) to Horseshoe Bend, then west into Black Canyon Reservoir. Below the reservoir's dam, the river flows past Emmett and Payette, then empties into the Snake River at the Oregon border. The Payette River has an average annual discharge into the Snake River of 2,192,000-acre-foot (2.704 km^{3}) of water.

== History ==
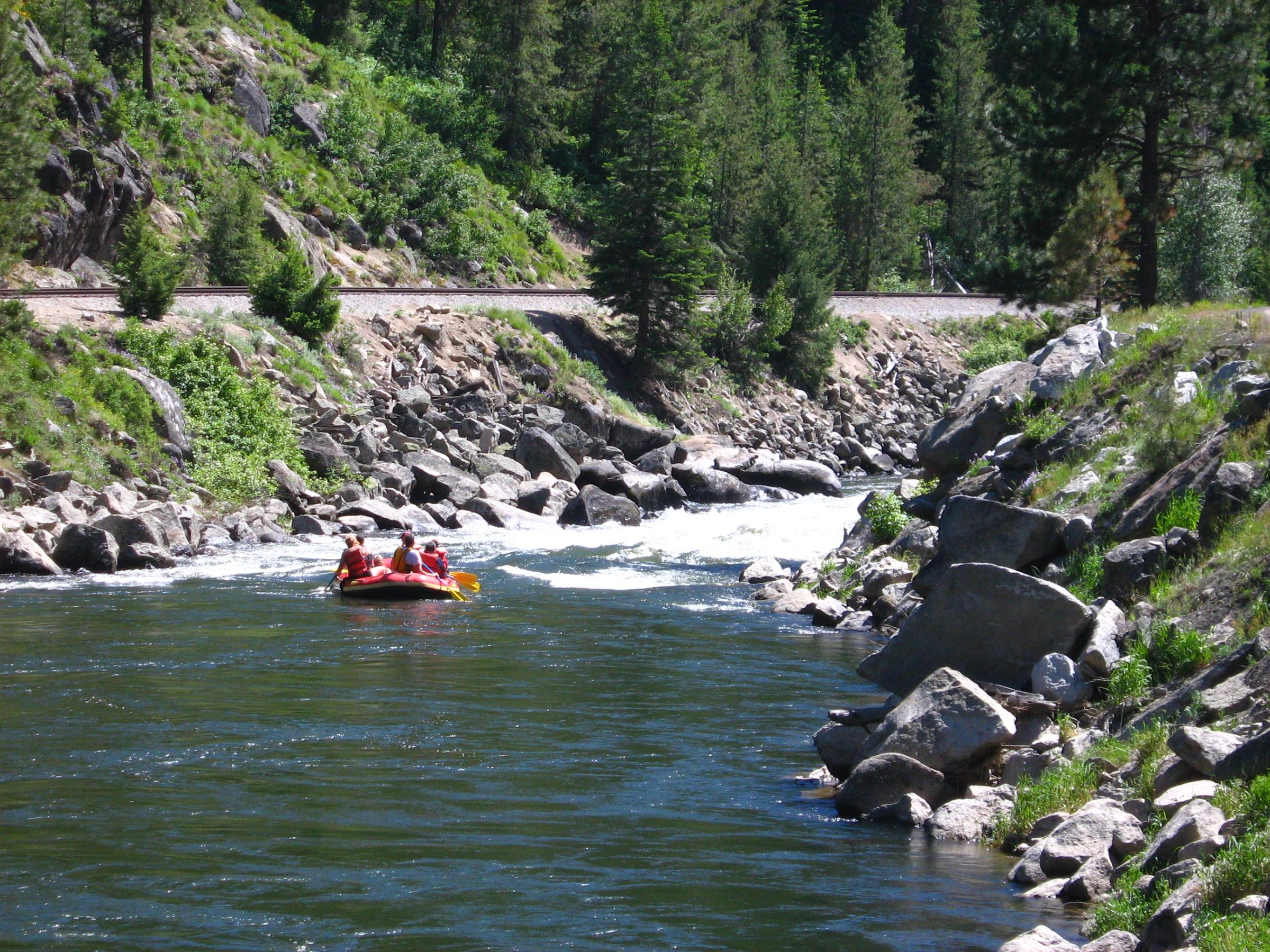
Rafters prepare for rapids on the North Fork near Banks, close to the beginning of the main stem of the Payette

The river's watershed was originally settled by the Shoshone, Nez Perce, Paiute and Bannock Native American groups. Before contact with Europeans, many of the indigenous peoples had no permanent villages or settlements. During the fall and winter, they camped in the semi-arid lower valley of the main stem Payette River. In spring and summer, they temporarily moved to the lush area of lakes and wetlands along the North Fork now known as Long Valley, where they hunted and gathered in preparation for the coming winter. Camas bulbs, widespread in this area, was a staple of their diet. In order to maintain the naturally occurring fields of camas, they would set controlled burns whenever they moved to the next camp. The seasonal burning also cleared unwanted vegetation and protected their campsites from overgrowth.

In the early 19th century, Europeans began exploring western Idaho. Francois Payette, for whom the river is named, was a French-Canadian fur trapper who worked for the North West Company and was one of the first people of European descent to explore the Payette River basin. Payette ventured east from Fort Astoria in 1818. From 1835 to 1844, he headed the Hudson's Bay Company's Fort Boise trading post near Parma, on the Snake River some distance south of the Payette River. In 1844, Payette retired to Montreal, still over twenty years before settlers began to arrive in great numbers from the eastern United States. One of the first pioneer settlements was on Clear Creek, a tributary of the South Fork Payette River. Many of the Native Americans were unhappy with the new settlers for taking and causing damage to their lands, especially due to mining, logging, and grazing. Armed conflicts resulted, including the Nez Perce War of 1877, when the US Army was dispatched to western Idaho.

Due to the abundant timber in the Payette River basin, one of the first new industries in the 19th century was logging, but did not reach large scale until the early 20th century. Demand for wooden railroad ties for the Oregon Short Line (OSL) in the 1880s increased logging operations in the area. One of the main centers of logging was in the southern part of Long Valley downstream from what is now the town of Cascade. A splash dam was built in 1902 by the Minnesota-based Payette Lumber and Manufacturing Company on the North Fork in order to help the transportation of logs downstream. Settlers began to move into the upper Payette basin, and in 1911, the Idaho Northern Railroad was constructed between Emmett along the Payette River, through Black Canyon and the North Fork, and ending just below Long Valley at Smith's Ferry on the river, named for a settler who bought the operation in 1891. The railroad transported timber, livestock and crops between Long Valley and the Treasure Valley.

Starting around 1874, there was heavy agricultural development in the valley of the lower Payette River. Irrigation systems were necessary due to the semi-arid climate of this area. The Last Chance Canal and Nobel Canal were among the first private ditches constructed to divert water from the Payette River. The U.S. Bureau of Reclamation (USBR) constructed Black Canyon Diversion Dam in 1924 to direct water from the Payette River into the Emmett and Black Canyon Canals, which run at higher elevations than the older ditches and vastly increased the potential for irrigation. In order to store water for irrigation in the dry season, the USBR constructed Deadwood Dam in 1929 on the Deadwood River tributary of the South Fork. Cascade Dam was constructed in 1948, flooding a large area of Long Valley. It provides more than four times the storage capacity of Deadwood.

== Fish and reservoirs ==
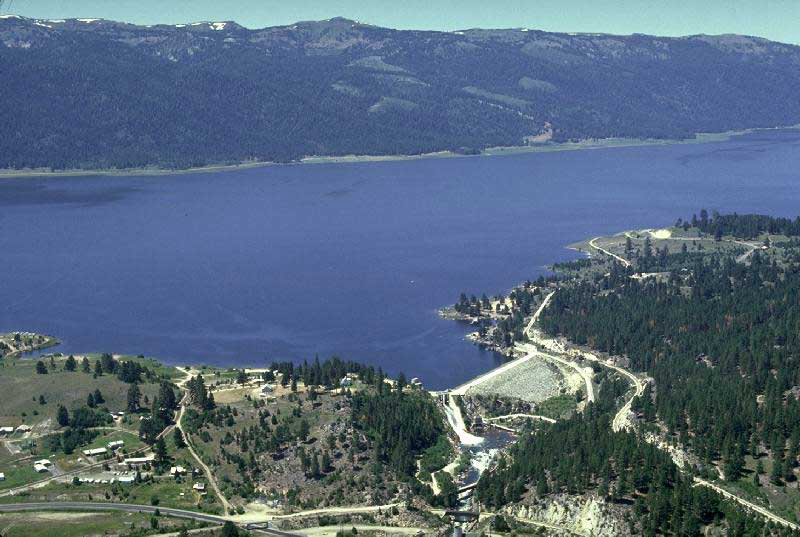
Cascade Dam forms Cascade Lake on the North Fork, the largest body of water in the Payette River drainage

Due to the wide range in elevation, the Payette River has a variety of fish and fish habitats. Salmon and steelhead were eliminated in the drainage by the Black Canyon Diversion Dam, which was first completed in 1924. From its mouth upstream to Black Canyon Dam, the river supports a mixed fishery for coldwater and warmwater species. Mountain whitefish make up the bulk of game fish in this section of river, with smallmouth bass, largemouth bass, channel catfish, black crappie, rainbow trout, and brown trout making significant contributions. Upstream from Black Canyon Dam, the gradient of the river increases with coldwater species increasing in abundance. The South Fork of the Payette River supports excellent populations of wild rainbow trout. The North Fork of the Payette River has been severely altered by railroad and highway construction and provides only a marginal fishery for salmonids. However, in unaltered sections such as the Cabarton reach, the North Fork is very productive for salmonids.

There are five major impoundments in the Payette basin: Black Canyon, Sage Hen, Paddock, Cascade, and Deadwood reservoirs. There are also several small impoundments and natural lakes with increased storage, such as the three Payette Lakes. Black Canyon, on the mainstem, provides only marginal fish habitat. Sand from upstream land disturbances has covered most of the habitat. Paddock Reservoir, on Big Willow Creek, has one of the better populations of black crappie in the state and a good fishery for largemouth bass. Cascade Reservoir on the North Fork is one of the most heavily fished waters in the state. Cascade has an abundance of yellow perch, coho salmon, and rainbow trout. Deadwood Reservoir, completed in 1931, contains kokanee and cutthroat trout.

Alpine lakes within the Payette River drainage are stocked with rainbow trout, cutthroat trout, cutbow (rainbow-cutthroat hybrids), golden trout, and Arctic grayling. Brook trout are also present in a number of lakes.

== Whitewater ==
The Payette River is famous for its whitewater. Experts call the North Fork Class V run one of the most challenging river reaches in North America, if not the world. Kayaking on the lower North Fork from Smith's Ferry to Banks is world-class, easily viewed from state highway #55, which closely hugs its bank, primarily on the west side. The lower North Fork narrows and drops 1700 feet (518 m) in the 16 miles (26 km) above Banks, providing nearly endless Class V rapids (see International Scale of River Difficulty). The average gradient is 110 feet (34 m) per mile (21 m/km) with a maximum gradient of 200 ft/mile (38 m/km). The North Fork's flow rate is controlled through the Cascade Dam, completed in 1948, providing relatively warm water from the shallow Cascade Reservoir.

To the east of Banks, the South Fork's Canyon, west of Lowman, is a challenging Class IV run for rafting. Along this trip is a 40-foot (12 m) Class VI waterfall (Big Falls), which is portaged. The North Fork and South Fork merge at Banks to form the Payette River (main), providing a float trip with numerous Class III rapids. The highway on this lower stretch of the river is on the east bank and a scenic railroad, the Thunder Mountain Line, runs above the west side.

== See also ==
- List of rivers of Idaho
- List of longest streams of Idaho
