= Smiths Ferry, Idaho =

Census-designated place in Valley County, Idaho, United States

- Census-designated place
- Location of Smiths Ferry in Valley County, Idaho.

- Location in the United States Location in Idaho
- Coordinates: 44°17′56″N 116°04′42″W
- Country: United States
- State: Idaho
- County: Valley

Area
  - Total: 2.009 sq mi (5.20 km^{2})
  - Land: 1.849 sq mi (4.79 km^{2})
  - Water: 0.160 sq mi (0.41 km^{2})
- Elevation: 4,544 ft (1,385 m)

Population (2010)
  - Total: 75
  - Density: 41/sq mi (16/km^{2})
- Time zone: UTC-7 (Mountain (MST))
  - Summer (DST): UTC-6 (MDT)
- Area codes: 208, 986
- GNIS feature ID: 2585593

Smiths Ferry is a census-designated place in Valley County, Idaho, United States. As of the 2020 census, Smiths Ferry had a population of 63. It is situated where the North Fork of the Payette River briefly calms and widens.

== History ==
A ferry at the river was established by Clinton Meyers in 1887 to transport livestock to summer pasture in the Round and Long Valleys across the river. Also popular with freighters, the ferry was sold by Meyers to Jim Smith in 1891, hence the name Smith's Ferry.

== Demographics ==
Historical population
Census	Pop.	Note	%±
2020	63		—
U.S. Decennial Census

== Transportation ==
- - SH-55 to Boise (south) and McCall (north)

Smiths Ferry sits along State Highway 55, the primary north–south route out of Boise, It was designated the "Payette River Scenic Byway" in 1977.

== 1962 B-47 crash ==
In 1962, a U.S. Air Force B-47E bomber crashed on a training mission shortly before midnight on August 22 in the mountains several miles south of Smiths Ferry (44.2037°N 116.064°W). Controlled flight into terrain started a forest fire near the summit of Packer John Mountain, and all three crew were killed. The B-47 was based in Arizona at Davis–Monthan Air Force Base near Tucson, where it had departed from earlier that Wednesday evening.

== See also ==
- List of census-designated places in Idaho
