= Idaho Northern Railroad =

Defunct Idaho railroad (early 1900s)

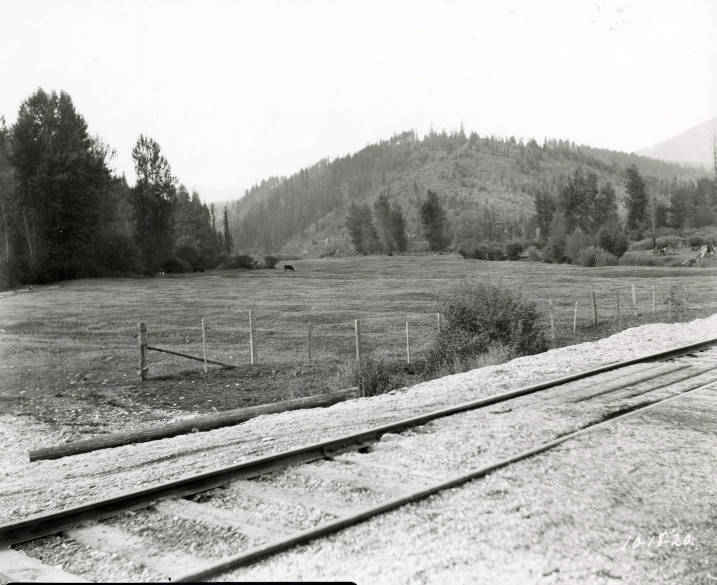
A picture of the Idaho Northern right of way near Linfor, Idaho, looking toward present day Bumblebee Campground and the junction of the Little North Fork of the Coeur d'Alene River and the North Fork of the Coeur d'Alene River. (1920)

The Idaho Northern Railroad built a branch line of the Oregon Railroad and Navigation Company (OR&N) in northern Idaho, U.S., connecting the main line at Enaville (Now considered a populated place in the unincorporated community of Kingston, Idaho) with Paragon (Formerly located on the Idaho side of the Idaho-Montana state line between Murray, Idaho, and Thompson Falls, Montana), a distance of 32.83 miles (52.83 km). The company was incorporated on January 10, 1906, and opened on August 1, 1909 as an operating subsidiary of the Union Pacific Railroad (UP), owner of the OR&N. On December 23, 1910, the property of the OR&N and Idaho Northern Railroad were conveyed to new UP subsidiary Oregon–Washington Railroad and Navigation Company.

The line was cut back from Paragon to Prichard after a December 1917 washout. A flood in December 1933 severely damaged the remainder of the line, and the Interstate Commerce Commission authorized its abandonment in 1935. Abandonment allowed for the widening and construction of present day Coeur d’Alene River Road.

== See also ==
- List of defunct Idaho railroads
- Ohio Match Railroad - This logging railroad terminated nearby at the end of Burnt Cabin Creek.
- Oregon Railroad and Navigation Company
