= Lake Cascade =

Cascade Dam
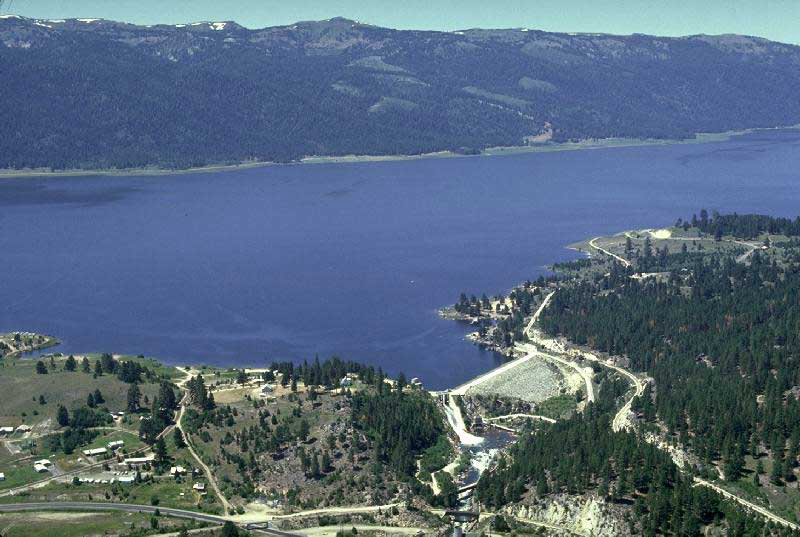
- Cascade Dam

- Location in the United States Cascade Dam (Idaho)
- Country: United States
- Location: Valley County, Idaho
- Coordinates: 44°31′26″N 116°03′04″W
- Purpose: Water storage
- Construction began: 1942, 1946
- Opening date: 1948; 78 years ago
- Owner: U.S. Bureau of Reclamation

Dam and spillways
- Type of dam: Zoned earthfill
- Impounds: N. Fork Payette River
- Height: 107 ft (33 m)
- Length: 785 ft (239 m)
- Width (base): 45 ft (14 m)

Reservoir
- Creates: Lake Cascade
- Total capacity: 693,100 acre-feet (854,900,000 m^{3})
- Catchment area: 620 sq mi (1,610 km^{2}).
- Surface area: 47 sq mi (122 km^{2})
- Normal elevation: 4,828 ft (1,472 m)
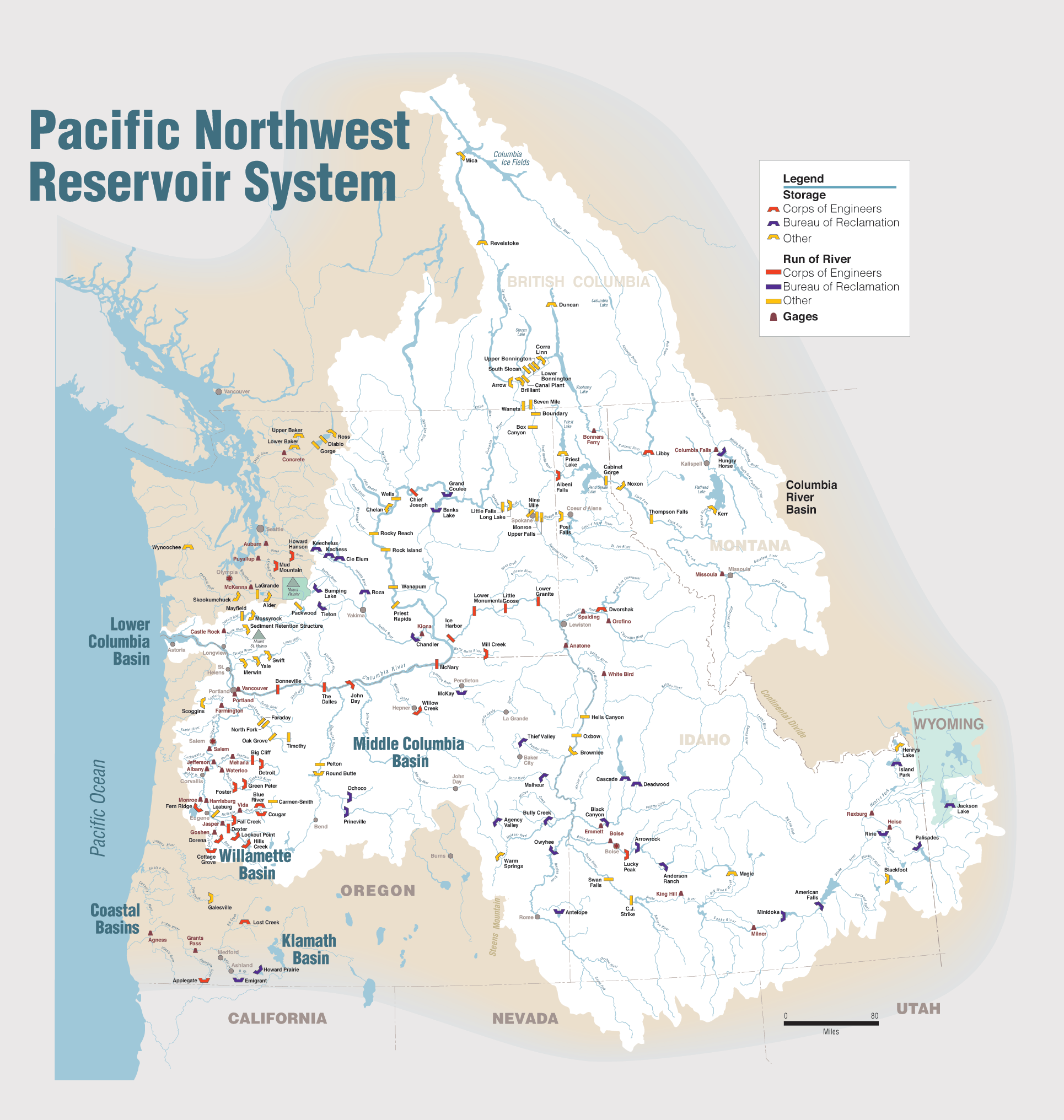
- Columbia River Basin

Lake Cascade (formerly Cascade Reservoir), is a reservoir in the western United States, on the North Fork of the Payette River in Valley County, Idaho. Located in the Boise National Forest, it has a surface area of 47 square miles (122 km^{2}), and is the fourth largest lake or reservoir in the state. The closest cities are Cascade, Donnelly, and McCall, all in the Long Valley of Valley County.

Following a delay due to World War II, the earthen dam was built by the Bureau of Reclamation, completed 78 years ago in 1948. The term "Lake Cascade" came into common use in the 1990s, with the federal name change made in 1999.

== Recreation ==
The lake contains perch, trout, smallmouth bass, Kokanee salmon, and Coho salmon for anglers. As well, ice fishing is popular at the lake. Lake Cascade State Park has several units around the lake.

== Sport fish restoration ==
In 2003 the Idaho Department of Fish and Game (IDFG) proposed draining Lake Cascade to facilitate the removal of pikeminnow and the addition of sport fish, such as perch. Pikeminnows are considered problematic to sport fishing in Lake Cascade because they are predators that live up to 15 years and compete for food stocks. Issues involved in mitigating damage during the lowering of the lake level include maintaining an adequate supply for irrigation, providing a steady stream for power, maintaining salmon flow augmentation, and other water rights. The U.S. Bureau of Reclamation manages the reservoir and estimated the draining could take place over the course of a year at a cost of $100,000 to $300,000. The U. S. Bureau of Reclamation withdrew its application for an Environmental Impact Statement studying the drawdown citing "that the draining of Lake Cascade is not a viable option for sport fish restoration."

== Water quality ==
The lake experienced a bloom of blue-green algae in 1993 caused by low water, high phosphorus content, and hot weather. Studies of water quality found phosphorus to be present in high levels which contributed to the algal bloom. Beginning in 1995, the water quality was monitored and an improvement plan was implemented to lower the phosphorus by 37 percent. By 2003 the lake had 57 percent less phosphorus than the initial monitoring in 1995 due to the best management practices adopted in the drainage basin of the lake.

== Tamarack Resort ==
Tamarack Resort is located on the west shore of the reservoir, southwest of Donnelly.
