= Horseshoe Bend, Idaho =

- City
- Location of Horseshoe Bend in Boise County, Idaho.
- Coordinates: 43°54′59″N 116°11′59″W
- Country: United States
- State: Idaho
- County: Boise

Area
  - Total: 1.10 sq mi (2.85 km^{2})
  - Land: 1.08 sq mi (2.81 km^{2})
  - Water: 0.015 sq mi (0.04 km^{2})
- Elevation: 2,674 ft (815 m)

Population (2020)
  - Total: 715
  - Density: 659/sq mi (254/km^{2})
- Time zone: UTC-7 (Mountain (MST))
  - Summer (DST): UTC-6 (MDT)
- ZIP code: 83629
- Area codes: 208, 986
- FIPS code: 16-38620
- GNIS feature ID: 2410795
- Website: www.horseshoebendidaho.org

Horseshoe Bend is the largest city in rural Boise County, in the southwestern part of the U.S. state of Idaho. Its population of 715 at the 2020 census was the largest in the county.

It is part of the Boise City–Nampa, Idaho Metropolitan Statistical Area. It is named for its location at the horseshoe-shaped U-turn of the Payette River, whose flow direction changes from south to north before heading west to the Black Canyon Reservoir.

== History ==
The area was originally settled as a gold miners' staging area, as prospectors waited along the river for snows to thaw at the higher elevations. Gold had been discovered in 1862 in the Boise Basin mountains to the east, near Idaho City.

The settlement became known as Warrinersville, after a local sawmill operator. The name was changed to Horseshoe Bend in 1867, and after the gold rush quieted, the city became a prosperous ranching and logging community. The railroad, from Emmett up to Long Valley following the Payette River (its North Fork above Banks), was completed in 1913.

In 1998 the city's primary employer, Boise Cascade, closed its sawmill on September 30. Horseshoe Bend has attempted to become the county seat of Boise County, replacing historic Idaho City.

== Education ==
Horseshoe Bend is served by a K-12 school campus, including the grade 6-12 Horseshoe Bend Middle/High School.

== Highways ==
- - SH-52 - to Emmett and Payette (west)
- - SH-55 to Boise (south) and McCall (north)

Horseshoe Bend sits along State Highway 55, the primary north–south route out of Boise, 23 miles (37 km) to the south and accessed over the 4,242-foot (1,293 m) Spring Valley summit, a.k.a. "Horseshoe Bend Hill." Highway 55 was designated the "Payette River Scenic Byway" in 1977. The new multi-lane grade was completed in fall 1991; the old curvier road is to the west, long plagued by landslides and closures.

== Recreation ==
Within an hour's drive north of Horseshoe Bend are the outdoor recreational areas of the Payette River basin, including Cascade, Tamarack Resort, and McCall.

Horseshoe Bend's current culture is a blend of ranching and a growing bedroom community for Boise. Its annual events include a banjo festival in late May, the national senior pro rodeo in June, and a fall festival in October. A scenic railroad, the Thunder Mountain Line, was based in the city, but it closed operation in 2016.

== Geography ==
According to the United States Census Bureau, the city has a total area of 1.09 square miles (2.82 km^{2}), of which, 1.08 square miles (2.80 km^{2}) is land and 0.01 square miles (0.03 km^{2}) is water.

=== Climate ===
According to the Köppen climate classification, Horseshoe Bend has either a hot-summer Mediterranean climate (Csa) or a dry-summer humid continental climate (Dsa) depending on the isotherm used.

Climate data for Horseshoe Bend, Idaho, 1991–2020 simulated normals (2602 ft elevation)
Month	Jan	Feb	Mar	Apr	May	Jun	Jul	Aug	Sep	Oct	Nov	Dec	Year
Mean daily maximum °F (°C)	38.8 (3.8)	46.2 (7.9)	55.4 (13.0)	63.1 (17.3)	72.5 (22.5)	81.3 (27.4)	92.5 (33.6)	91.0 (32.8)	80.6 (27.0)	66.0 (18.9)	49.8 (9.9)	39.4 (4.1)	64.7 (18.2)
Daily mean °F (°C)	31.3 (−0.4)	36.5 (2.5)	43.9 (6.6)	49.8 (9.9)	58.3 (14.6)	65.8 (18.8)	74.8 (23.8)	73.4 (23.0)	64.2 (17.9)	52.0 (11.1)	39.6 (4.2)	31.8 (−0.1)	51.8 (11.0)
Mean daily minimum °F (°C)	23.9 (−4.5)	27.0 (−2.8)	32.2 (0.1)	36.5 (2.5)	44.2 (6.8)	50.4 (10.2)	57.0 (13.9)	55.8 (13.2)	47.7 (8.7)	37.9 (3.3)	29.5 (−1.4)	24.1 (−4.4)	38.9 (3.8)
Average precipitation inches (mm)	1.85 (47.08)	1.31 (33.26)	1.66 (42.11)	1.38 (35.07)	1.66 (42.13)	0.94 (23.78)	0.29 (7.26)	0.22 (5.54)	0.47 (11.90)	0.99 (25.12)	1.43 (36.35)	2.16 (54.81)	14.36 (364.41)
Average dew point °F (°C)	25.2 (−3.8)	26.8 (−2.9)	29.3 (−1.5)	31.8 (−0.1)	37.6 (3.1)	41.2 (5.1)	42.8 (6.0)	40.3 (4.6)	36.9 (2.7)	32.9 (0.5)	29.1 (−1.6)	25.0 (−3.9)	33.2 (0.7)
Source: Prism Climate Group

== Demographics ==
Historical population
Census	Pop.	Note	%±
1950	401		—
1960	480		19.7%
1970	511		6.5%
1980	700		37.0%
1990	643		−8.1%
2000	770		19.8%
2010	707		−8.2%
2020	715		1.1%
U.S. Decennial Census

=== 2010 census ===
As of the census of 2010, there were 707 people, 284 households, and 195 families residing in the city. The population density was 654.6 inhabitants per square mile (252.7/km^{2}). There were 330 housing units at an average density of 305.6 per square mile (118.0/km^{2}). The racial makeup of the city was 93.6% White, 0.6% Native American, 0.3% Asian, 4.0% from other races, and 1.6% from two or more races. Hispanic or Latino of any race were 7.2% of the population.

There were 284 households, of which 30.6% had children under the age of 18 living with them, 51.1% were married couples living together, 12.7% had a female householder with no husband present, 4.9% had a male householder with no wife present, and 31.3% were non-families. 26.4% of all households were made up of individuals, and 9.1% had someone living alone who was 65 years of age or older. The average household size was 2.49 and the average family size was 2.97.

The median age in the city was 40 years. 24.3% of residents were under the age of 18; 8.8% were between the ages of 18 and 24; 22.5% were from 25 to 44; 29.1% were from 45 to 64; and 15.4% were 65 years of age or older. The gender makeup of the city was 49.2% male and 50.8% female.

=== 2000 census ===
As of the census of 2000, there were 770 people, 261 households, and 192 families residing in the city. The population density was 1,247.4 inhabitants per square mile (481.6/km^{2}). There were 290 housing units at an average density of 469.8 per square mile (181.4/km^{2}). The racial makeup of the city was 92.34% White, 0.78% Native American, 0.13% Asian, 4.29% from other races, and 2.47% from two or more races. Hispanic or Latino of any race were 8.96% of the population.

There were 261 households, out of which 41.0% had children under the age of 18 living with them, 55.6% were married couples living together, 10.7% had a female householder with no husband present, and 26.4% were non-families. 21.8% of all households were made up of individuals, and 10.3% had someone living alone who was 65 years of age or older. The average household size was 2.79 and the average family size was 3.23.

In the city, the population was spread out, with 31.6% under the age of 18, 8.2% from 18 to 24, 28.6% from 25 to 44, 20.8% from 45 to 64, and 10.9% who were 65 years of age or older. The median age was 32 years. For every 100 females, there were 109.2 males. For every 100 females age 18 and over, there were 116.0 males.

The median income for a household in the city was $32,125, and the median income for a family was $35,882. Males had a median income of $29,583 versus $24,063 for females. The per capita income for the city was $12,486. About 11.2% of families and 19.5% of the population were below the poverty line, including 21.5% of those under age 18 and 13.3% of those age 65 or over.
