= Eagle, Idaho =

City in Idaho, United States

- City
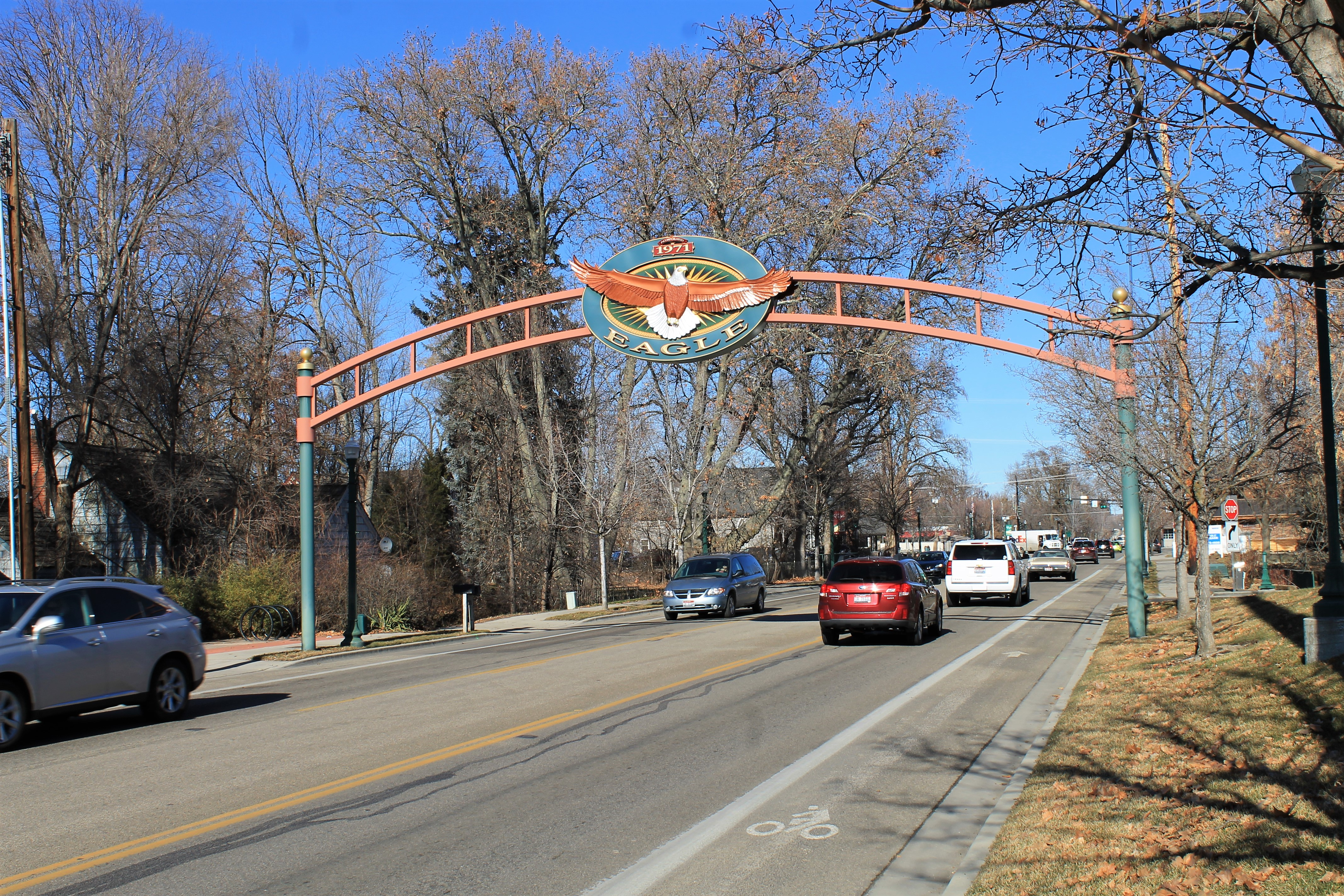
- The entrance sign to Eagle

- Flag Seal
- Motto: "Life, Done Right."
- Location of Eagle in Ada County, Idaho.

- Location in the United States
- Coordinates: 43°41′35″N 116°20′47″W
- Country: United States
- State: Idaho
- County: Ada

Area
  - Total: 31.08 sq mi (80.49 km^{2})
  - Land: 30.57 sq mi (79.18 km^{2})
  - Water: 0.51 sq mi (1.31 km^{2})
- Elevation: 2,599 ft (792 m)

Population (2020)
  - Total: 30,346
  - Density: 985/sq mi (380.2/km^{2})
- Time zone: UTC−7 (Mountain (MST))
  - Summer (DST): UTC−6 (MDT)
- ZIP code: 83616
- Area codes: 208 and 986
- FIPS code: 16-23410
- GNIS feature ID: 2410378
- Website: www.cityofeagle.org

Eagle is a city in Ada County, Idaho, ten miles (16 km) northwest of downtown Boise. The population was 30,346 at the 2020 census.

== History ==
=== 19th century ===
Eagle Island in Idaho was settled in 1863 by Truman Coe Catlin, who later shifted from crop farming to dairy farming, starting the island's dairy tradition. He also pioneered irrigation in the area by constructing a wide irrigation ditch. The most notable early community developer was Thomas Hugh Aiken, a Canadian surveyor, who helped establish the Eagle community in the 1870s. Despite the construction of Arrowrock Dam in 1915 and subsequent dams, flooding has been a recurrent issue for residents, leading to continued efforts to mitigate flood risks.

=== 20th century ===
The Eagle Fish Hatchery, established in the late 1940s in Idaho, was originally part of a trout program until the 1980s. In 1991, it was restructured to support the conservation of Snake River sockeye salmon, an endangered species listed that year. The hatchery's mission shifted to preserving the species and its genetic diversity through the development of eight broodstocks derived from smolts, anadromous adults, and residual populations. It also houses the IDFG Eagle Fish Health Laboratory.

== Geography ==
According to the United States Census Bureau, the city has a total area of 29.40 square miles (76.15 km^{2}), of which 28.92 square miles (74.90 km^{2}) is land and 0.48 square miles (1.24 km^{2}) is water.

=== Climate ===
This region experiences warm to hot, dry summers, and cold, dry winters averaging ten inches (25 cm) of snow, with summer high temperatures averaging 79.6 °F (26.4 °C) and winter low temperatures averaging 30.6 °F (−0.8 °C). According to the Köppen climate classification system, Eagle has a "Csb" on climate maps.

== Demographics ==
Historical population
Census	Pop.	Note	%±
1980	2,620		—
1990	3,327		27.0%
2000	11,085		233.2%
2010	19,908		79.6%
2020	30,346		52.4%
2021 (est.)	32,100		5.8%
U.S. Decennial Census

Eagle is home to many retired civil servants, especially police officers and firefighters, from California. The Los Angeles Times has described California pension money from CalPERS as "the lifeblood of the economy" in Eagle.

=== 2020 census ===
As of the 2020 census, there were 30,346 people, 11,096 households, and 8,293 families in the city. The population density was 984.7 inhabitants per square mile (380.2/km^{2}). There were 11,964 housing units at an average density of 384.9 units per square mile (148.6 units/km^{2}).

The median age was 45.8 years. 24.3% of residents were under the age of 18 and 21.3% were 65 years of age or older. For every 100 females there were 95.7 males, and for every 100 females age 18 and over there were 92.2 males age 18 and over.

98.9% of residents lived in urban areas, while 1.1% lived in rural areas.

Of the 11,096 households, 33.0% had children under the age of 18 living in them. Of all households, 69.8% were married-couple households, 9.1% were households with a male householder and no spouse or partner present, and 17.4% were households with a female householder and no spouse or partner present. About 17.3% of households were made up of individuals and 9.8% had someone living alone who was 65 years of age or older. The average household size was 2.65 and the average family size was 3.04.

There were 11,964 housing units, of which 7.3% were vacant. The homeowner vacancy rate was 1.3% and the rental vacancy rate was 17.1%.

Racial composition as of the 2020 census
Race	Number	Percent
White	26,692	88.0%
Black or African American	135	0.4%
American Indian and Alaska Native	129	0.4%
Asian	508	1.7%
Native Hawaiian and Other Pacific Islander	40	0.1%
Some other race	502	1.7%
Two or more races	2,340	7.7%
Hispanic or Latino (of any race)	2,042	6.7%

The median household income was $91,414 and the median family income was $107,607. Males had a median income of $65,625 versus $45,787 for females. The per capita income for the city was $51,917. About 5.3% of families and 6.7% of the population were below the poverty line, including 5.3% of those under age 18 and 7.1% of those age 65 or over.

=== 2010 census ===
At the 2010 census there were 19,908 people, 7,069 households, and 5,585 families living in the city. The population density was 688.4 inhabitants per square mile (265.8/km^{2}). There were 7,570 housing units at an average density of 261.8 units per square mile (101.1 units/km^{2}). The racial makeup of the city was 94.4% White, 0.3% African American, 0.5% Native American, 1.6% Asian, 0.1% Pacific Islander, 1.0% from other races, and 2.0% from two or more races. Hispanic or Latino of any race were 4.7%.

Of the 7,069 households 41.5% had children under the age of 18 living with them, 67.9% were married couples living together, 7.9% had a female householder with no husband present, 3.2% had a male householder with no wife present, and 21.0% were non-families. 17.7% of households were one person and 8.5% were one person aged 65 or older. The average household size was 2.82 and the average family size was 3.20.

The median age was 40.6 years. 30.8% of residents were under the age of 18; 5.4% were between the ages of 18 and 24; 21.3% were from 25 to 44; 30.3% were from 45 to 64; and 12.1% were 65 or older. The gender makeup of the city was 49.1% male and 50.9% female.

=== 2000 census ===
At the 2000 census there were 11,085 people, 3,864 households, and 3,098 families living in the city. The population density was 1,206.3 inhabitants per square mile (465.8/km^{2}). There were 4,048 housing units at an average density of 440.5 units per square mile (170.1 units/km^{2}). The racial makeup of the city was 95.90% White, 0.37% African American, 0.47% Native American, 0.74% Asian, 0.13% Pacific Islander, 0.59% from other races, and 1.80% from two or more races. Hispanic or Latino of any race were 2.63%.

Of the 3,864 households 45.9% had children under the age of 18 living with them, 69.4% were married couples living together, 7.6% had a female householder with no husband present, and 19.8% were non-families. 16.1% of households were one person and 5.3% were one person aged 65 or older. The average household size was 2.87 and the average family size was 3.23.

The age distribution was 32.6% under the age of 18, 5.6% from 18 to 24, 31.1% from 25 to 44, 23.1% from 45 to 64, and 7.6% 65 or older. The median age was 35 years. For every 100 females, there were 100.7 males. For every 100 females aged 18 and over, there were 95.5 males.

The median household income was $65,313 and the median family income was $71,907. Males had a median income of $50,962 versus $29,066 for females. The per capita income for the city was $27,226. About 4.0% of families and 3.8% of the population were below the poverty line, including 4.9% of those under age 18 and 3.5% of those age 65 or over.

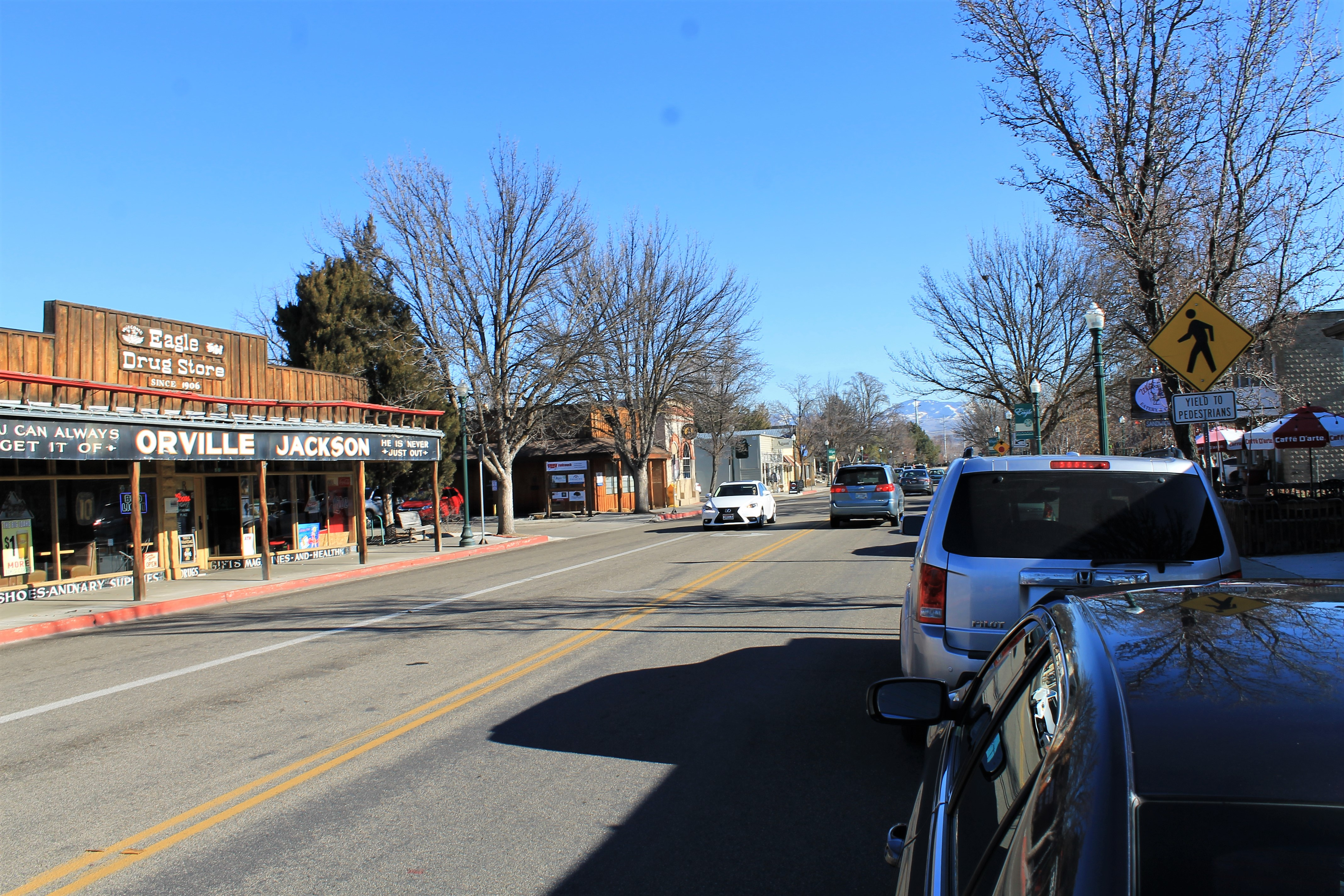
Downtown Eagle

== Parks and recreation ==
The city features numerous parks, including Arboretum Park, Friendship Park, Heritage Park, Orval Krasen Park, Reid W. Merrill Sr. Community Park, and Stephen C. Guerber Park, among others. The Parks and Recreation department offers youth sports leagues, camps, special events (such as Eagle Fun Days), and maintains extensive trails. Nearby Eagle Island State Park provides a swimming beach, trails, disc golf, and winter sports.

== Education ==
Most of Eagle is in the West Ada School District, with a small portion in the Boise School District. The portion in the Boise School District is zoned to: Shadow Hills Elementary School, Riverglen Middle School, and Capital High School.

== In popular culture ==
The 2008 show The Baby Borrowers was filmed in Eagle. Eagle was the filming location for the 1980 film Bronco Billy.

== Notable people ==
- Blake Bodily, soccer player
- Larry Craig, former U.S. Senator from Idaho; lived in Eagle as of 2008
- Taylor Kelly, football player; grew up in Eagle
- George Kennedy, actor; lived in Eagle at the time of his death
- Tanner Mangum, American football quarterback
- Travis Milburn, racing driver
- Jeb Putzier, NFL tight end
- Derek Schouman, NFL tight end
- Andrew Tuttle, racing driver
- John Wood, racing driver
