= Emmett, Idaho =

- City
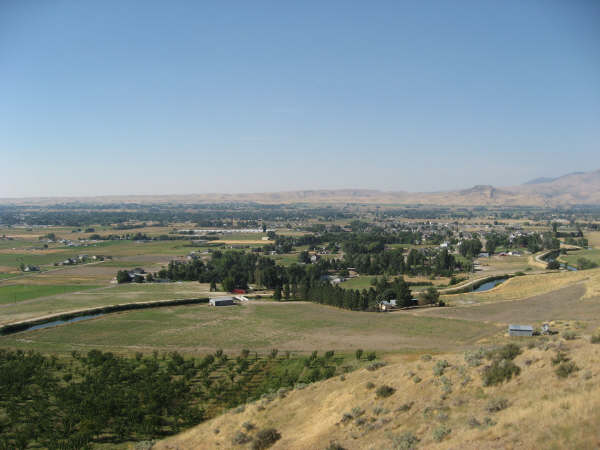
- View of Emmett

- Location of Emmett in Gem County, Idaho.

- Location in the United States
- Coordinates: 43°52′22″N 116°29′42″W
- Country: United States
- State: Idaho
- County: Gem

Area
  - Total: 2.62 sq mi (6.79 km^{2})
  - Land: 2.60 sq mi (6.74 km^{2})
  - Water: 0.019 sq mi (0.05 km^{2})
- Elevation: 2,379 ft (725 m)

Population (2020)
  - Total: 7,647
  - Density: 2,940/sq mi (1,130/km^{2})
- Time zone: UTC-7 (Mountain (MST))
  - Summer (DST): UTC-6 (MDT)
- ZIP code: 83617
- Area code: 208
- FIPS code: 16-25570
- GNIS feature ID: 2410437
- Website: www.cityofemmett.org

Emmett is a city in Gem County, Idaho, United States. The population was 7,647 at the 2020 census, up from 6,557 in 2010. It is the county seat and the only city in the county. Emmett is part of the Boise metropolitan area.

== History ==
Emmett is a town on the southern bank of the Payette River that grew up around a ferry crossing of the Payette River. Emmett was originally called Martinsville, named after Nathaniel Martin who, along with Jonathan Smith, built the ferry crossing. Next, the name was changed to "Emmettville," because it was primarily a post office named after Emmett Cahalan, the son of Tom Cahalan, an early settler of the area. The post office was later moved but the town retained the name. A few years later the "ville" was dropped and the post office and town became simply Emmett. In 1883 James Wardwell had the town platted, and in 1900 the town was incorporated as Emmett. Later, in March 1902, the Idaho Northern Railroad came to the valley.

After the closing of the mines in 1906, the power lines were extended to Emmett. A series of irrigation projects made it possible for more rapid expansion of the town as the major service center for a farming and fruit-growing valley. In the early 1900s fruit packers adopted the label of "Gem of Plenty" because of the fertility of the valley. During the mining era the valley was known as the "garden" for the mining regions.

While campaigning for a return to Congress in 1934, Robert M. McCracken died in an automobile accident near Emmett. His vehicle went through a guard rail and tumbled down Freezeout Hill.

Until 2001, the city was home to a Boise Cascade manufacturing facility. The Black Canyon diversion dam on the Payette River, built in the early 1920s, is east of the city.

Rising some 5,906 feet (1,800 m) above sea level, Squaw Butte, named by [Confederate Settlers new to the area]; Native Americans who used this area as their winter resort, stands at the north end of the valley. The Payette River was named after Francois Payette, a fur trader from Quebec who was put in charge of old Fort Boise in 1818 and traveled through the area. Permanent settlement began in the early 1860s, after gold discoveries in the Boise Basin brought people over the established stage and pack train routes. Two of these trails joined at the Payette River north of the present river bridge in Emmett.

== Geography ==
According to the United States Census Bureau, the city has a total area of 2.82 square miles (7.30 km^{2}), of which 2.80 square miles (7.25 km^{2}) is land and 0.02 square miles (0.05 km^{2}) is water. It is located south of the Payette River, at an elevation of 2,362 feet (720 m) above sea level.

=== Climate ===
Emmett experiences a semi-arid climate (Köppen BSk) with cold, moist winters and hot, dry summers.

Climate data for Emmett, Idaho, 1991–2020 normals, extremes 1906–present
Month	Jan	Feb	Mar	Apr	May	Jun	Jul	Aug	Sep	Oct	Nov	Dec	Year
Record high °F (°C)	63 (17)	71 (22)	82 (28)	94 (34)	100 (38)	110 (43)	111 (44)	109 (43)	103 (39)	95 (35)	76 (24)	74 (23)	111 (44)
Mean maximum °F (°C)	52.2 (11.2)	59.1 (15.1)	70.0 (21.1)	79.7 (26.5)	89.3 (31.8)	97.0 (36.1)	103.0 (39.4)	101.1 (38.4)	94.2 (34.6)	83.1 (28.4)	64.7 (18.2)	56.1 (13.4)	103.9 (39.9)
Mean daily maximum °F (°C)	38.3 (3.5)	46.0 (7.8)	55.9 (13.3)	62.8 (17.1)	72.3 (22.4)	80.9 (27.2)	91.7 (33.2)	90.4 (32.4)	79.7 (26.5)	65.2 (18.4)	49.2 (9.6)	38.9 (3.8)	64.3 (17.9)
Daily mean °F (°C)	30.8 (−0.7)	36.3 (2.4)	43.9 (6.6)	49.3 (9.6)	57.9 (14.4)	65.6 (18.7)	74.7 (23.7)	73.5 (23.1)	64.0 (17.8)	51.6 (10.9)	39.1 (3.9)	31.2 (−0.4)	51.5 (10.8)
Mean daily minimum °F (°C)	23.3 (−4.8)	26.6 (−3.0)	31.8 (−0.1)	35.8 (2.1)	43.5 (6.4)	50.3 (10.2)	57.6 (14.2)	56.5 (13.6)	48.2 (9.0)	38.1 (3.4)	29.1 (−1.6)	23.5 (−4.7)	38.7 (3.7)
Mean minimum °F (°C)	9.0 (−12.8)	15.1 (−9.4)	22.0 (−5.6)	26.3 (−3.2)	31.7 (−0.2)	39.6 (4.2)	48.2 (9.0)	47.5 (8.6)	37.6 (3.1)	25.8 (−3.4)	16.7 (−8.5)	10.5 (−11.9)	4.5 (−15.3)
Record low °F (°C)	−27 (−33)	−16 (−27)	6 (−14)	12 (−11)	23 (−5)	30 (−1)	35 (2)	31 (−1)	21 (−6)	12 (−11)	−13 (−25)	−27 (−33)	−27 (−33)
Average precipitation inches (mm)	1.77 (45)	1.26 (32)	1.60 (41)	1.22 (31)	1.47 (37)	0.77 (20)	0.25 (6.4)	0.17 (4.3)	0.42 (11)	0.90 (23)	1.33 (34)	2.12 (54)	13.28 (338.7)
Average snowfall inches (cm)	1.7 (4.3)	1.4 (3.6)	0.1 (0.25)	0.1 (0.25)	0.0 (0.0)	0.0 (0.0)	0.0 (0.0)	0.0 (0.0)	0.0 (0.0)	0.0 (0.0)	0.5 (1.3)	3.6 (9.1)	7.4 (18.8)
Average precipitation days (≥ 0.01 in)	11.2	9.3	10.8	9.6	8.9	6.1	2.1	1.9	3.8	6.2	9.5	11.9	91.3
Average snowy days (≥ 0.1 in)	1.6	1.3	0.3	0.1	0.0	0.0	0.0	0.0	0.0	0.0	0.3	2.3	5.9
Source 1: NOAA
Source 2: National Weather Service

== Demographics ==
Historical population
Census	Pop.	Note	%±
1910	1,351		—
1920	2,204		63.1%
1930	2,763		25.4%
1940	3,203		15.9%
1950	3,067		−4.2%
1960	3,769		22.9%
1970	3,945		4.7%
1980	4,605		16.7%
1990	4,601		−0.1%
2000	5,490		19.3%
2010	6,557		19.4%
2020	7,647		16.6%
U.S. Decennial Census

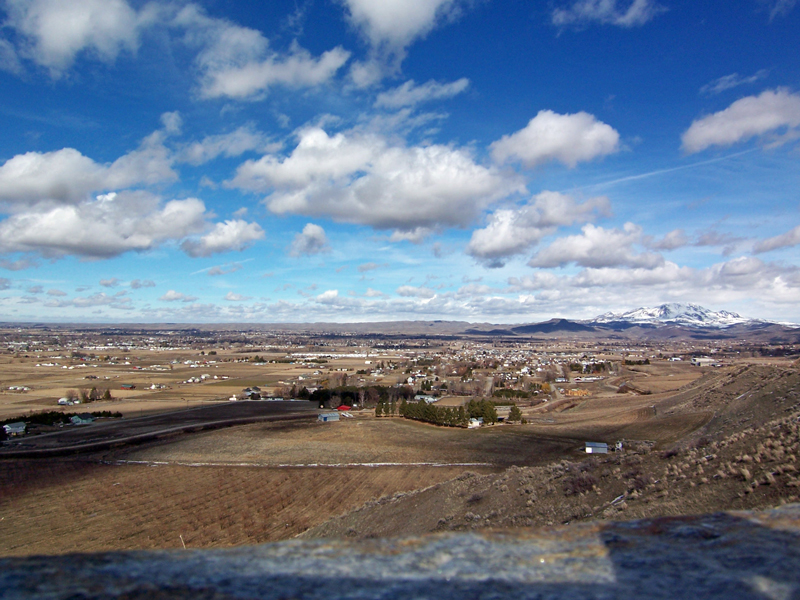
Aerial view of Emmett

=== 2020 census ===
Note: the US Census treats Hispanic/Latino as an ethnic category. This table excludes Latinos from the racial categories and assigns them to a separate category. Hispanics/Latinos can be of any race.

Emmett racial composition (NH = Non-Hispanic)
Race	Number	Percentage
White (NH)	6,078	79.48%
Black or African American (NH)	19	0.25%
Native American or Alaska Native (NH)	57	0.75%
Asian (NH)	46	0.6%
Pacific Islander (NH)	16	0.21%
Some Other Race (NH)	30	0.39%
Mixed/Multi-Racial (NH)	377	4.93%
Hispanic or Latino	1,024	13.39%
Total	7,647	

As of the 2020 census, Emmett had a population of 7,647. The median age was 38.2 years. 25.7% of residents were under the age of 18 and 21.1% were 65 years of age or older. For every 100 females, there were 95.0 males, and for every 100 females age 18 and over, there were 90.8 males.

99.3% of residents lived in urban areas, while 0.7% lived in rural areas.

There were 2,977 households and 1,790 families in Emmett. Of all households, 31.5% had children under the age of 18 living in them. 41.8% were married-couple households, 20.6% were households with a male householder and no spouse or partner present, and 30.2% were households with a female householder and no spouse or partner present. About 32.7% of all households were made up of individuals, and 17.2% had someone living alone who was 65 years of age or older.

There were 3,119 housing units, of which 4.6% were vacant. The homeowner vacancy rate was 1.4% and the rental vacancy rate was 3.3%.

=== 2010 census ===
As of the census of 2010, there were 6,557 people, 2,616 households, and 1,635 families living in the city. The population density was 2,341.8 inhabitants per square mile (904.2/km^{2}). There were 2,916 housing units at an average density of 1,041.4 units per square mile (402.1 units/km^{2}). The racial makeup of the city was 91.1% White, 0.2% African American, 0.6% Native American, 0.7% Asian, 0.1% Pacific Islander, 4.6% from other races, and 2.6% from two or more races. Hispanic or Latino of any race were 12.7% of the population.

There were 2,616 households, of which 33.6% had children under the age of 18 living with them, 44.5% were married couples living together, 13.0% had a female householder with no husband present, 5.0% had a male householder with no wife present, and 37.5% were non-families. 32.3% of all households were made up of individuals, and 17.2% had someone living alone who was 65 years of age or older. The average household size was 2.46 and the average family size was 3.12.

The median age in the city was 36.3 years. 27.2% of residents were under the age of 18; 8.4% were between the ages of 18 and 24; 24.7% were from 25 to 44; 22.3% were from 45 to 64; and 17.4% were 65 years of age or older. The gender makeup of the city was 48.4% male and 51.6% female.

=== 2000 census ===
As of the census of 2000, there were 5,490 people, 2,095 households, and 1,412 families living in the city. The population density was 3,022.5 inhabitants per square mile (1,167.0/km^{2}). There were 2,264 housing units at an average density of 1,246.4 units per square mile (481.2 units/km^{2}). The racial makeup of the city was 90.60% White, 0.07% African American, 0.75% Native American, 0.44% Asian, 0.15% Pacific Islander, 5.79% from other races, and 2.20% from two or more races. Hispanic or Latino of any race were 11.57% of the population.

There were 2,095 households, out of which 34.4% had children under the age of 18 living with them, 50.5% were married couples living together, 12.9% had a female householder with no husband present, and 32.6% were non-families. 28.3% of all households were made up of individuals, and 14.9% had someone living alone who was 65 years of age or older. The average household size was 2.55 and the average family size was 3.13.

In the city, the population was spread out, with 28.4% under the age of 18, 9.1% from 18 to 24, 26.3% from 25 to 44, 18.4% from 45 to 64, and 17.8% who were 65 years of age or older. The median age was 35 years. For every 100 females, there were 90.6 males. For every 100 females age 18 and over, there were 85.5 males.

The median income for a household in the city was $26,480, and the median income for a family was $34,663. Males had a median income of $30,598 versus $19,088 for females. The per capita income for the city was $13,027. About 16.3% of families and 17.8% of the population were below the poverty line, including 23.4% of those under age 18 and 16.5% of those age 65 or over.

== Infrastructure ==
=== Highways ===
- - SH-16 (south) - connects to Eagle/Boise (southeast) via SH-44
- - SH-52 - to Payette/Ontario (west) and Horseshoe Bend (east)

== Education ==
There is a single K-12 school district in the county: Emmett Independent School District 221.

Residents of Gem County are in the area (but not the taxation zone) for College of Western Idaho.

== Notable people ==
- Carlos Bilbao, member of the Idaho House of Representatives.
- Ammon Bundy, leader of the Occupation of the Malheur National Wildlife Refuge
- Hattie Johnson, Olympic shooter.
- Brad Little, Governor of Idaho
- Aaron Paul, Emmy Award-winning actor born in Emmett.
- Clayne L. Pope, professor of economics at Brigham Young University.
- Paul Graham Popham, U.S. Special Forces Vietnam, General Manager McGraw Hill, Inc.
- Steven Thayn, member of Idaho Senate

== See also ==
- Emmett High School
