= National Register of Historic Places listings in Payette County, Idaho =

Location of Payette County in Idaho

This is a list of the National Register of Historic Places listings in Payette County, Idaho.

This is intended to be a complete list of the properties on the National Register of Historic Places in Payette County, Idaho, United States. Latitude and longitude coordinates are provided for many National Register properties and districts; these locations may be seen together in a map.

There are 15 properties listed on the National Register in the county. More may be added; properties and districts nationwide are added to the Register weekly.

This National Park Service list is complete through NPS recent listings posted May 30, 2025.

== Current listings ==
	Name on the Register	Image	Date listed	Location	City or town	Description
1	David C. Chase House	David C. Chase House	February 7, 1978 (#78001091)	307 N. 9th St. 44°04′43″N 116°56′02″W	Payette	
2	Coughanour Apartment Block	Coughanour Apartment Block	May 23, 1978 (#78001092)	700–718 1st Ave., N. 44°04′33″N 116°56′10″W	Payette	Building no longer exists.
3	N. A. Jacobsen Building	N. A. Jacobsen Building	November 17, 1982 (#82000358)	N. 8th St. and 1st Ave. 44°04′33″N 116°56′05″W	Payette	
4	N. A. Jacobsen House	N. A. Jacobsen House	January 7, 1998 (#97001610)	1115 1st Ave., N. 44°04′35″N 116°55′48″W	Payette	
5	Methodist Episcopal Church of Payette	Methodist Episcopal Church of Payette	October 5, 1977 (#77000469)	90 S. 9th St. 44°04′26″N 116°56′02″W	Payette	
6	A. B. Moss Building	A. B. Moss Building	February 8, 1978 (#78001093)	137 N. 8th St. 44°04′37″N 116°56′07″W	Payette	
7	New Plymouth Congregational Church	New Plymouth Congregational Church	November 17, 1982 (#82000359)	207 Southwest Ave. 43°58′08″N 116°49′17″W	New Plymouth	
8	J. C. Palumbo Fruit Company Packing and Warehouse Building	J. C. Palumbo Fruit Company Packing and Warehouse Building	November 17, 1982 (#82000360)	2nd Ave., S., and 6th St. 44°04′22″N 116°56′15″W	Payette	
9	Payette City Hall and Courthouse	Payette City Hall and Courthouse	May 14, 1979 (#79000808)	3rd Ave., N., and 8th St. 44°04′41″N 116°56′05″W	Payette	
10	Portia Club	Portia Club	April 7, 2010 (#10000159)	225 N. 9th St. 44°04′40″N 116°56′02″W	Payette	
11	St. James Episcopal Church	St. James Episcopal Church	April 20, 1978 (#78001094)	1st Ave., N. and 10th St. 44°04′34″N 116°55′54″W	Payette	
12	St. John's Church	St. John's Church	June 5, 2013 (#13000353)	350 N. 4th St. 44°04′46″N 116°56′27″W	Payette	
13	U.S. Post Office – Payette Main	U.S. Post Office – Payette Main	March 16, 1989 (#89000134)	915 Center Ave. 44°04′31″N 116°55′59″W	Payette	
14	Grant Whitney House	Grant Whitney House	February 23, 1978 (#78001095)	1015 7th Ave., N. 44°04′56″N 116°55′54″W	Payette	Building no longer exists.
15	Woodward Building	Woodward Building	April 26, 1978 (#78001096)	23 8th St. 44°04′27″N 116°56′05″W	Payette	

== See also ==
- List of National Historic Landmarks in Idaho
- National Register of Historic Places listings in Idaho
