= Harleston =

Harleston may refer to:

== Places ==
- Harleston, Devon
- Harleston, Norfolk
- Harleston, Suffolk

== People with the surname ==
- Bernard W. Harleston (born 1930), American college administrator
- Edward Harleston (1794–1826), American planter and politician
- Edwin Harleston (1882–1931), American painter
- Elise Forrest Harleston (1891–1970), American photographer

== Other uses ==
- Harleston (ship), several ships
- Harleston railway station, Harleston, Norfolk

== See also ==
- J. Harleston Parker (1873–1930), American architect
  - Harleston Parker Medal
- Jeffries v. Harleston
- Redenhall with Harleston, a place in South Norfolk, England
