= Plymouth Congregational Church =

Plymouth Congregational Church may refer to:

- Plymouth Congregational Church (New Haven, Connecticut), listed on the NRHP in New Haven, Connecticut
- Plymouth Congregational Church (Miami, Florida), listed on the NRHP in Miami, Florida
- New Plymouth Congregational Church (New Plymouth, Idaho), listed on the NRHP in Payette County, Idaho
- Plymouth Congregational Church (Lawrence, Kansas), listed on the NRHP in Douglas County, Kansas
- Plymouth Congregational Church (Syracuse, New York), listed on the NRHP in Syracuse, New York
- Plymouth Congregational Church (Charleston, South Carolina), established at Avery Institute, the historic original church building is now a residence

== See also ==
- Plymouth Church (Brooklyn)
- Plymouth Church Seattle
