= Woodward Building =

Woodward Building may refer to:

- Woodward Building (Birmingham, Alabama), one of the "Heaviest Corner on Earth" buildings, listed on the National Register of Historic Places in Jefferson County, Alabama
- Woodward Building (Payette, Idaho), listed on the National Register of Historic Places in Payette County, Idaho

== See also ==
- Woodward House (disambiguation)
