= List of shipwrecks in March 1826 =

The list of shipwrecks in March 1826 includes some ships sunk, foundered, grounded, or otherwise lost during March 1826.

== 1 March ==
List of shipwrecks: 1 March 1826
Ship	State	Description
Confiance en Dieu	France	The ship was wrecked in the Adriatic Sea. She was on a voyage from Trieste, to Thessaloniki, Greece.
Duchess of York	United Kingdom	The transport ship was wrecked on the north coast of Guadeloupe. All on board were rescued.
Friends Endeavour	United Kingdom	The ship was wrecked between Helford, Cornwall and The Manacles.
Joseph	United Kingdom	The ship was wrecked on the Gunfleet Sand, in the North Sea off the coast of Essex. Her crew were rescued.

== 2 March ==
List of shipwrecks: 2 March 1826
Ship	State	Description
Betsey	United Kingdom	The ship foundered in the Atlantic Ocean. Her crew were rescued by Brabander (Netherlands).
Joseph	United States	The ship was wrecked on the English Bank, in the South Atlantic off the coast of Uruguay. She was on a voyage from Montevideo, Uruguay, to Rio Grande.

== 3 March ==
List of shipwrecks: 3 March 1826
Ship	State	Description
Charles	(United Kingdom of Great Britain and Ireland) British North America	The ship collided with Robert Fulton (United Kingdom) and foundered in the Atlantic Ocean. Her crew were rescued by Robert Fulton. Charles was on a voyage from Viana do Castelo, Portugal to Newfoundland.

== 4 March ==
List of shipwrecks: 4 March 1826
Ship	State	Description
Friendship	United Kingdom	The schooner sprang a leak and was beached north of the mouth of the River Don, Aberdeenshire, where she was subsequently wrecked. She was on a voyage from Sunderland, County Durham to Aberdeen.
Mary	United Kingdom	The ship was wrecked at Beaumaris, Anglesey. She was on a voyage from Liverpool, Lancashire, to Dublin.
Sophia	United Kingdom	The ship was driven ashore on the Mew. She was on a voyage from Whitehaven, Cumberland to Belfast, County Antrim.

== 6 March ==
List of shipwrecks: 6 March 1826
Ship	State	Description
Abby	United Kingdom	The ship was driven ashore and damaged near Penmon Point, Anglesey. She was on a voyage from Antwerp, Netherlands to Bangor. Abby was refloated the next day and taken in to Beaumaris, Anglesey.
Brothers	United Kingdom	The ship was driven ashore and wrecked near Moelfre, Anglesey. Her crew were rescued. She was on a voyage from Red Wharf Bay to Liverpool, Lancashire.
Herman	Russia	The ship was driven ashore near Seacombe, Cheshire, United Kingdom. She was on a voyage from Liepāja to Liverpool. Herman was refloated the next day and taken in to Liverpool.
Jane	United Kingdom	The ship was driven ashore on the Foreness Rock, Margate, Kent and was damaged. She was refloated the next day and taken in to Margate.
John and Susan	United Kingdom	The schooner capsized and sank in the North Sea off Scarborough, Yorkshire with the loss of two of her crew.
Lusitania	United Kingdom	The ship was driven ashore near Seacombe. She was on a voyage from Liverpool to Sierra Leone. Lusitania was refloated the next day.
Richard Pope	United Kingdom	The ship was wrecked in Dundrum Bay with the loss of four of her crew. She was on a voyage from Liverpool, Lancashire to Sierra Leone.

== 7 March ==
List of shipwrecks: 7 March 1826
Ship	State	Description
Ann	United Kingdom	The ship sank in the Thames Estuary between the Girdler Sand and the Pan Sand. She was on a voyage from Cardiff, Glamorgan to London.
Elizabeth	United Kingdom	The ship was driven ashore at North Foreland, Kent. She was on a voyage from Plymouth, Devon to London. Elizabeth was refloated the next day and resumed her voyage.
Frances Mary	United Kingdom	The ship was abandoned in the Atlantic Ocean having been previously wrecked at sea with the loss of eleven of her crew. Six survivors were rescued by HMS Blonde (Royal Navy). Frances Mary was on a voyage from New Brunswick, British North America to Liverpool, Lancashire. She was later discovered by HMS Diamond (Royal Navy), which put a skeleton crew on board and took her in to São Miguel Island, Azores, where she arrived on 5 August.

== 9 March ==
List of shipwrecks: 9 March 1826
Ship	State	Description
Jane	United Kingdom	The ship collided with another vessel and foundered off Amlwch, Anglesey. She was on a voyage from Amlwch to Chester, Cheshire.
Jane	United Kingdom	The ship was in collision with another vessel off Portsmouth, Hampshire and sank.

== 10 March ==
List of shipwrecks: 10 March 1826
Ship	State	Description
Amity	United Kingdom	The ship ran aground and capsized at Ramsgate, Kent. She was on a voyage from London to Cork.

== 11 March ==
List of shipwrecks: 11 March 1826
Ship	State	Description
Ida	Danzig	The ship was wrecked on North Ronaldsay, Orkney Islands, United Kingdom. Her crew were rescued. She was on a voyage from Danzig to Liverpool, Lancashire, United Kingdom.
Henrietta Wilhelmina	Danzig	The ship was wrecked on North Ronaldsay. Her crew were rescued. She was on a voyage from Danzig to Liverpool.
Neptunus	Danzig	The ship was wrecked on North Ronaldsay. Her crew were rescued. She was on a voyage from Danzig to Liverpool.
Sociedad Feliz	Portugal	The ship was wrecked at Porto. She was on a voyage from Rio de Janeiro, Brazil to Porto.

== 12 March ==
List of shipwrecks: 12 March 1826
Ship	State	Description
Flor de Beiria	Portugal	The ship was driven ashore near Dartmouth, Devon, United Kingdom. She was on a voyage from London, United Kingdom to Porto. Flor de Beiria was refloated the next day.
Perseverance	United Kingdom	The ship was wrecked at the Cape of Good Hope. All on board survived. She was on a voyage from London to Bengal, India.
Violet	United Kingdom	The ship was driven ashore and wrecked at Pittenweem, Fife. She was on a voyage from Leith, Lothian to Dublin.

== 13 March ==
List of shipwrecks: 13 March 1826
Ship	State	Description
Harmony	United Kingdom	The ship was wrecked at Knysna, Africa. Her crew were rescued.
Henrietta Wilhelmina	Danzig	The ship was wrecked on North Ronaldsay, Orkney Islands, United Kingdom. Her crew were rescued. She was on a voyage from Danzig to Liverpool, Lancashire, United Kingdom.
Ida	Danzig	The ship was wrecked on North Ronaldsay. Her crew were rescued. She was on a voyage from Danzig to Liverpool.
Neptunus	Danzig	The ship was wrecked on North Ronaldsay. Her crew were rescued. She was on a voyage from Danzig to Liverpool.
Tarquin	United States	The whaler sprang a leak and foundered in the Atlantic Ocean. Her eighteen crew survived. She was on a voyage from Japan to Nantucket, Massachusetts.

== 15 March ==
List of shipwrecks: 15 March 1826
Ship	State	Description
St. Giuseppe	Kingdom of Sardinia	The brig was wrecked near Mazagan, Morocco. Her crew were rescued.

== 16 March ==
List of shipwrecks: 16 March 1826
Ship	State	Description
Ann	United Kingdom	The ship ran aground on the Herd Sand, in the North Sea off the coast of County Durham. Her crew were rescued by the North Shields Lifeboat. Ann was later taken in to North Shields, County Durham.

== 18 March ==
List of shipwrecks: 18 March 1826
Ship	State	Description
Grocer	United Kingdom	The ship was in collision with another vessel and foundered in the North Sea off the coast of Norfolk. Her crew were rescued. She was on a voyage from Selby, Yorkshire to London.
Lucinda	Elbing	The ship was driven ashore at Pillau, Prussia. She was on a voyage from Gothenburg, Sweden to Pillau.
Merope	United States	The ship was wrecked between the River Plate and Río Negro. Her crew were rescued.

== 20 March ==
List of shipwrecks: 20 March 1826
Ship	State	Description
George	United Kingdom	The ship was abandoned in the Atlantic Ocean. Her crew were rescued by Courier (United Kingdom). George was on a voyage from Maranhão, Brazil to Liverpool, Lancashire.

== 21 March ==
List of shipwrecks: 21 March 1826
Ship	State	Description
Maria	(United Kingdom of Great Britain and Ireland) New South Wales	The cutter was lost on this date.
Nadezhda (Надежда, 'Hope')	Imperial Russian Navy	The transport ship, a brig, ran aground, capsized, and was wrecked in Sevastopol Bay with the loss of five crew members and one rescuer.
Union	United Kingdom	The ship was driven ashore at Winterton-on-Sea, Norfolk. Her crew were rescued. She was on a voyage from Hull, Yorkshire to London.

== 23 March ==
List of shipwrecks: 23 March 1826
Ship	State	Description
Benwell	United Kingdom	The ship was struck by lightning and foundered in the Mediterranean Sea off the coast of Algeria. Her crew survived. She was on a voyage from Plymouth, Devon to Agrigento, Sicily.
Elizabeth	United Kingdom	The ship was wrecked on Læsø, Denmark. Her crew were rescued. She was on a voyage from London to Memel, Prussia.
Gebroeders Goelert	Netherlands	The ship was wrecked on Læsø. She was on a voyage from Antwerp to a Baltic port.
Mary & Susan	United Kingdom	The ship was wrecked at Charleston, South Carolina, United States. She was on a voyage from Havana, Cuba to Hamburg.
Sarah	United Kingdom	The ship struck a rock and foundered in the Irish Sea off Newby, Cumberland. Her crew were rescued. She was on a voyage from Whitehaven, Cumberland, to Annan, Dumfriesshire.
Union	United Kingdom	The ship was driven ashore at Winterton-on-Sea, Norfolk. Her crew were rescued. She was on a voyage from Hull, Yorkshire to London.

== 24 March ==
List of shipwrecks: 24 March 1826
Ship	State	Description
Brothers	United Kingdom	The ship caught fire at Hull, Yorkshire and was scuttled.
Erwarting	Prussia	The ship was abandoned off Marstrand, Sweden. Her crew were rescued. She was on a voyage from Memel to Drogheda, County Louth, United Kingdom.

== 26 March ==
List of shipwrecks: 26 March 1826
Ship	State	Description
Bem Cazados	Portugal	The ship was wrecked at Margate, Kent, United Kingdom with the loss of three of her nine crew and a pilot. She was on a voyage from Amsterdam, North Holland, Netherlands to A Coruña, Spain and Lisbon.
Harleston	United Kingdom	Harleston put into Mauritius in an unseaworthy state while returning to London from Timor. The surveyors at Mauritius condemned her and she was then sold for breaking up. Her cargo of 200 tons of oil was transferred to Minerva, Norris, master, for shipment to London.
Sarah	United Kingdom	The ship struck the Corton Sand, in the North Sea off the coast of Suffolk and foundered. All on board were rescued. She was on a voyage from Newcastle upon Tyne, Northumberland to London.
Swift	United Kingdom	The ship foundered in the Atlantic Ocean off the Longships Lighthouse. Her crew were rescued. She was on a voyage from Neath, Glamorgan, to Bridport, Dorset.

== 28 March ==
List of shipwrecks: 28 March 1826
Ship	State	Description
Amelia	Russia	The ship was driven ashore at Elwick, Orkney Islands, United Kingdom. She was on a voyage from Pärnu to Liverpool, Lancashire, United Kingdom.
Endeavour	United Kingdom	The ship was driven ashore and sank at Bergen, Norway.
Mary	United States	The ship was abandoned in the Atlantic Ocean. She was on a voyage from Boston, Massachusetts to Gothenburg, Sweden. Mary was later towed in to Marblehead, Massachusetts.
Trusty	United Kingdom	The ship was driven ashore and wrecked at Seaton Sluice, County Durham.

== 29 March ==
List of shipwrecks: 29 March 1826
Ship	State	Description
Albertina	Norway	The ship was driven ashore in Widewall Bay, Orkney Islands, United Kingdom. She was on a voyage from Dram to Belfast, County Antrim, United Kingdom.
Greyhound	(United Kingdom of Great Britain and Ireland) Tobago	The schooner was lost at Tobago.
Hercules	United Kingdom	The ship was driven ashore at Greenock, Renfrewshire. She was on a voyage from Greenock to Marseille, Bouches-du-Rhône, France. Hercules was refloated on 1 April and towed in to Port Glasgow, Renfrewshire for repairs.
Speculation	Lübeck	The ship was driven ashore and wrecked at Baltic Port, Russia.

== 30 March ==
List of shipwrecks: 30 March 1826
Ship	State	Description
Galathea	Flag unknown	The ship foundered in the North Sea south of Bergen, Norway. Her crew were rescued. She was on a voyage from Aarhus, Denmark to Trondheim, Norway.
Hebe	United Kingdom	The ship was wrecked on Vlieland, Friesland, United Kingdom of the Netherlands with the loss of two of her crew. She was on a voyage from London to Hamburg.
Lise	Netherlands	The ship sprang a leak and sank off Ostend. She was on a voyage from Rotterdam, South Holland to Rouen, Seine-Inférieure, France.
Macduff	United Kingdom	The ship ran aground on the Herd Sand, in the North Sea off the coast of County Durham. Her crew were rescued by the North Shields Lifeboat. She was on a voyage from Inverness to North Shields, County Durham. Macduff was refloated on 3 April and taken in to North Shields.
Trusty	United Kingdom	The ship was wrecked near Hartley, Northumberland.

== 31 March ==
List of shipwrecks: 31 March 1826
Ship	State	Description
Friendship	United Kingdom	The ship was driven ashore at Thisted, Denmark with the loss of a crew member. She was on a voyage from London to Danzig.
HMS Procris	Royal Navy	The Cherokee-class brig-sloop ran aground and capsized at Harwich, Essex. She was refloated the next day.
Vigilant	United States	The ship sprang a leak and was abandoned in the Atlantic Ocean. Her crew were rescued by John (United Kingdom). She was on a voyage from Charleston, South Carolina to Hamburg.

== Unknown date ==
List of shipwrecks: Unknown date in March 1826
Ship	State	Description
Adams	United States	The ship was abandoned in the Atlantic Ocean on or before 11 March. She was on a voyage from Boston, Massachusetts to La Rochelle, Charente-Maritime, France.
Camden	United Kingdom	The sealer was wrecked on the coast of Patagonia, Argentina. Dove (United Kingdom) rescued the crew.
Cornelia	Netherlands	The ship was lost on the coast of Calabria, Kingdom of the Two Sicilies. She was on a voyage from Trieste to Antwerp.
Despatch	(United Kingdom of Great Britain and Ireland) New South Wales	The two-masted schooner was lost whilst on a voyage from Hobart, Van Diemen's Land to Maria Island.
Maria	Sweden	The ship was driven ashore and wrecked at Honfleur, Calvados, France in late March. She was on a voyage from Sundsvall to Rouen, Seine-Inférieure, France.
Maria	United Kingdom	The ship was wrecked on Sandy Island, Antigua with the loss of all on board. She was on a voyage from Saint Thomas, Virgin Islands to Barbados.
Molligheten	Norway	The ship was driven ashore north of Stavanger. She was on a voyage from Bergen to Rouen. Molligheten was later refloated and taken in to Stavanger.
Neutral	United Kingdom	The ship was lost off King's Lynn, Norfolk in early March. She was on a voyage from London to Wisbech, Cambridgeshire.
Penelope	United Kingdom	The ship was abandoned in the Atlantic Ocean on or before 14 March.
Susan	United Kingdom	The ship was abandoned in the Atlantic Ocean in early March. Her crew survived.
Suzanne	France	The ship was driven ashore at Calais. She was on a voyage from Liverpool, Lancashire, United Kingdom to Calais. She was refloated the next day.
