= Elise Forrest Harleston =

African-American photographer (1891–1970)

- Born: February 8, 1891; Charleston, South Carolina, United States
- Died: 1970 (aged 78–79)
- Known for: Photography

Elise Forrest Harleston (February 8, 1891 – 1970) was South Carolina's first black female photographer. She was also one of the first Black female photographers in the United States.

Elise Beatrice Forrest was born in Charleston, South Carolina, on February 8, 1891. She was the third child of seven to Elvira Moorer and Augustus Forrest, who was an accountant. Elise’s paternal grandmother was a "free person of color”.

Elise Beatrice Forrest became Elise Forrest Harleston after she married successful African-American painter Edwin Augustus Harleston, who was nine years her senior.

== Career and education ==
When Elise was 22 years old, she met Edwin Augustus Harleston in Charleston, South Carolina in 1913. Both Elise and Edwin were graduates of the Avery Normal Institute, a private school for Black youth which was established in 1868. Elise graduated from the Avery Normal Institute in 1908. After graduating, she worked as a teacher in rural South Carolina, this was due to the fact that at this time it was illegal for African Americans to become teachers in Charleston's public schools. However, she soon grew tired of the experience and returned to Charleston, where she then worked as a seamstress at the Union Millinery & Notion Company, which she co-founded in 1914 with three other black women.

Before their meeting, Edwin spent several years as a student at the School of the Museum of Fine Arts in Boston. However, money struggles forced him to return home and work for his family's funeral business. In 1916, his father sent him to the Renouard Training School for Embalmers in Manhattan. Elise asked many friends in New York if she could stay with them so she could remain close to her boyfriend. Eventually, Elise was able to obtain a job and teach impoverished students at Long Island. When the two of them returned home, Edwin supported Elise in enrolling in photography school so the two could marry and open a studio together.

In the fall of 1919, Elise traveled to New York City and enrolled at the E. Brunel School of Photography. There, Elise was one of only two African-American students, and she was the only female. Edwin and Elise married on September 15, 1920. Elise then enrolled, with Edwin’s encouragement, at the Tuskegee Institute in Alabama in 1921. While here she continued her education by studying with C.M. Battey, who was the head of and founded the Photography Division at Tuskegee Institute. After learning and receiving guidance from Battey, Elise's work became an embodiment of the "New Negro" movement through combatting racial stereotypes and injustice within her art.

Soon, after returning to Charleston in 1922, Edwin and Elise opened The Harleston Studio: 118 Calhoun Street in Charleston, this earned them the title of being the first African American Artists working in Charleston who were academically trained. Their studio lasted from 1922 to 1931. There she produced and sold a series of portraits of Charleston's black street vendors. The couple operated the studio as a team, Edwin was the painter, and Elise was the photographer, and often collaborated on multiple projects together. Elise would take photographs of the subjects, while Edwin would paint from the photos for his portraits, such as the subject of his prize-winning drawing A Colored Grand Army Man. This allowed his clients to save many hours of painful posing. Despite this, more credit is provided to Edwin for his work than to Elise for her contribution to the Harleston Studio.

== Family ==
Shortly after their wedding, Edwin and Elise assumed guardianship of their niece, Gussie Harleston after the death of her mother. In addition to Gussie, they also raised another niece, Doris Forrest. Edwin and Elise never had children of their own.

== Displayed work ==
Aaron Douglas worked with Edwin to create a set of murals that are displayed at Fisk University.

In 1996, two of Elise's black and white prints were showcased in an exhibition called "A History of Women Photographers", which was held at the New York Public Library. Until then, her work had been never in an exhibition outside of the state of South Carolina.

== Life after Edwin ==
After contracting pneumonia from his father, Edwin Harleston died on May 10, 1931. Due to Edwin's death, Harleston ended her photography career, closing The Harleston Studio and selling her equipment. A year later, she remarried to John J. Wheeler, a school teacher. The couple lived in Baltimore and Chicago before retiring to Southern California in the early 1940s. Elise Forrest Harleston died due to a brain aneurysm in 1970 at the age of 79.

Not long after Harleston's death in 1970, one of her family members discovered a box of glass-plate negatives that had been saved. Many of her papers are now held by Emory University's Stuart A. Rose Manuscript, Archives, and Rare Book Library.

== Quotes from Edwin Harleston and Elise Harleston ==
“Find out for me, please, every fine point about photographing a drawing and a painting for patent reasons ---we may need it someday." - Edwin Harleston to Elise Harleston

"I'm glad to learn that you're doing a little work sufficiently good to charge people for it ---keep it up." - Edwin Harleston to Elise Harleston, 1920

“Nineteen hundred and twenty must be our year." Edwin Harleston to Elise Harleston, about their upcoming marriage.

"He is wonderful! He is worthy of all I've gone through in waiting for him. He is the soul of honor, and he is my husband!" Elise Harleston, in reference to her marriage to Edwin.
