= Woodward House =

Woodward House may refer to:

in the United States

(by state)

- Woodward-Baird House, Boulder, Colorado, listed on the National Register of Historic Places in Boulder, Colorado
- Woodward House (Denver, Colorado), in Civic Center Historic District (Denver, Colorado) (or Denver Civic Center)
- Ashbel Woodward House, Franklin, Connecticut, listed on the National Register of Historic Places in New London County, Connecticut
- Woodward Houses, Wilmington, Delaware, listed on the National Register of Historic Places listings in Wilmington, Delaware
- Chester B. Woodward House, Topeka, Kansas, listed on the National Register of Historic Places in Shawnee County, Kansas
- Woodward House (Greensburg, Kentucky), listed on the National Register of Historic Places in Green County, Kentucky
- John Woodward House, Newton, Massachusetts, listed on the NRHP in Massachusetts
- Rev. Samuel Woodward House, Weston, Massachusetts, listed on the NRHP in Massachusetts
- William Woodward House, Taunton, Massachusetts, listed on the NRHP in Massachusetts
- Elias Woodward House, Corvallis, Oregon, listed on the NRHP in Oregon
- Woodward House (Houston, Texas), listed on the National Register of Historic Places in Harris County, Texas
- Dr. M. M. Woodward House, San Angelo, Texas, listed on the NRHP in Tom Green County, Texas
- David J. and May Bock Woodward House, San Antonio, Texas, listed on the National Register of Historic Places in Bexar County, Texas
- Woodward House (Richmond, Virginia), listed on the National Register of Historic Places in Richmond, Virginia
- Robert Simpson Woodward House, Washington, D.C., listed on the NRHP in Washington, D.C.

== See also ==
- Woodward Building (disambiguation)
