= Plymouth Church =

Plymouth Church may refer to:

== In the United States ==
- Plymouth Church (Brooklyn), on the National Register of Historic Places
- Plymouth Church, Des Moines, Iowa, in Des Moines, Iowa
- First Plymouth Church, in Lincoln, Nebraska
- Plymouth Church of Shaker Heights, in Shaker Heights, Ohio
- Plymouth Church Seattle, in Seattle, Washington

== In the United Kingdom ==
- Plymouth Minster, the 11th century or earlier church of St Andrew's, Plymouth
