= Black Female Photographers =

Black Female Photographers (BFP) is an online organization that uses the medium of photography to unite black women photographers around the world and work to change the common narratives in the photography industry as a whole. The organization has over 5,000 members worldwide and was founded in 2008.

For the last 15 years Black Female Photographers has hosted a yearly National Black Female Photographers Day, which unites photographers from around the world with a city photo tour and networking luncheon. This gives community members an opportunity for leadership while making BFP visible in its global communities. BFP also hosts a yearly Vision Conference to provide resources, tools and workshops for photographers. The 2017 Vision Conference took place in Dallas, Texas, the 2018 Vision Conference in Atlanta, Georgia.

Kym Scott founded Black Female Photographers in 2008 as a way to create a small community of women with which to access and share her work and ideas. The group took off in popularity instantly and has grown to an organization wide ranging in scope and photography genres. With the help of Lead Facilitator NJ Stevenson and a team of Volunteers photographers there are local events in the United States as well as a periodic publications such as the Melanin Lens Magazine. Ms. Scott specializes in fine-art photography and received a Certificate in Professional Photography from the Center for Digital Imaging Arts at Boston University.

== Featured members ==
NJ Stevenson, Cheriss May, Audrey Woulard Laylah Amatullah Barrayn Lynsey N. Weatherspoon
