= N. A. Jacobsen Building =

- Jacobsen, N. A., Building
- U.S. National Register of Historic Places
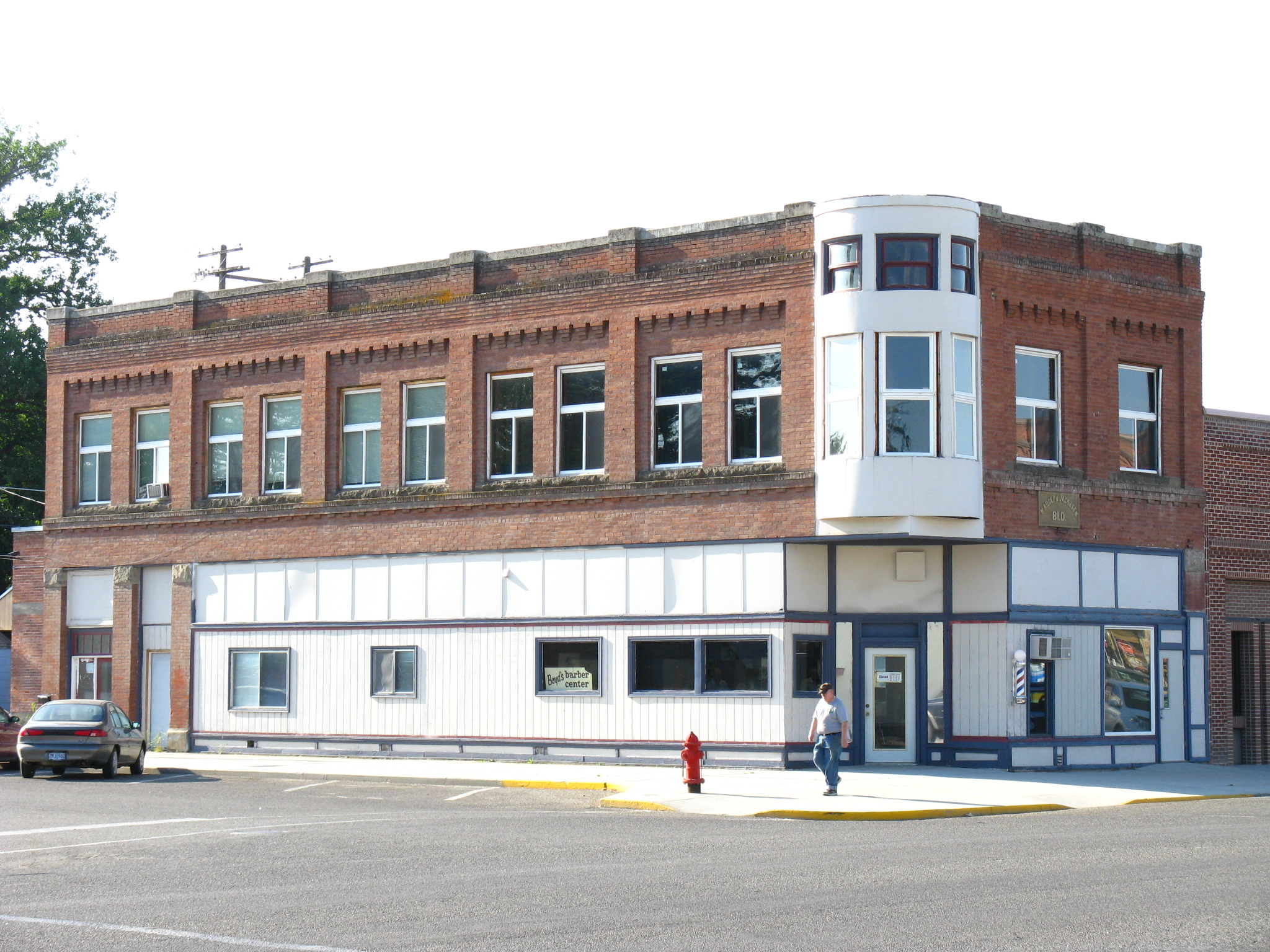
- The building in 2008

- Location within Idaho Location within the United States
- Location: N. 8th Street and 1st Avenue, Payette, Idaho
- Coordinates: 44°04′25″N 116°56′06″W
- Area: less than one acre
- Built: 1908
- Architect: John E. Tourtellotte
- MPS: Tourtellotte and Hummel Architecture TR
- NRHP reference No.: 82000358
- Added to NRHP: November 17, 1982

The N. A. Jacobsen Building is a historic two-story building in Payette, Idaho. It was designed by architect John E. Tourtellotte, and built in 1908 for N. A. Jacobsen. It has been listed on the National Register of Historic Places since November 17, 1982.
