= Harleston (ship) =

Peter Everitt Mestaer owned two ships named Harleston, apparently in quick succession selling one and buying the other, with the result that they are readily conflated:

- Harleston (1811 ship) was launched at Ipswich in 1811 for Mestaer. She made one voyage under charter to the British East India Company. Around 1813 she apparently sailed for Bengal and then became a country ship in India; she was still listed with Bengal Registry in 1823, but not in 1829.
- Harleston (1813 ship) was an American vessel launched in 1810 at Wiscasset, Maine, and probably taken in prize. Mestaer purchased her c.1813, and she became a West Indiaman until she was sold on Mestaer's death. She became a whaler and on her way home from her second whaling voyage was condemned in 1826 at Mauritius as unseaworthy.
