= Plymouth Congregational Church (Charleston, South Carolina) =

Church in the United States

Coordinates: 32.7830°N 79.9404°W

Plymouth Congregational Church is a historic congregation founded by African Americans in Charleston, South Carolina. It was established in 1867. Services were initially held at Avery Normal Institute, the city's first school for African Americans. The historic original church building is now a residence. George C. Rowe, a printer and poet, was a minister at the church. A state historical marker is at the site.

The congregation was established by African Americans, including former slaves emancipated after the American Civil War. They split off from the prominent Circular Congregational Church. The church was backed by the American Missionary Society.

The congregation eventually relocated to the West Ashley section of Charleston.

Francis L. Cardozo was one of the church's early pastors. His granddaughter married Paul Robeson who stayed at the church's parsonage.

Phil Noble bought the former parsonage for use as a residence.
