= Lowcountry Digital Library =

Lowcountry Digital Library (LCDL) is a digital library project hosted by the College of Charleston in the U.S. state of South Carolina. Part of the Digital Library of America network, the Lowcountry Digital Library hosts about 200 collections of primary sources drawn from organizations including the South Carolina Historical Society, Charleston Library Society, Avery Research Center for African American History and Culture, Huguenot Society of South Carolina, the Citadel, Roman Catholic Diocese of Charleston, three county library systems, and a number of other historic sites, research centers and archives in the geographical and culturally distinct South Carolina Lowcountry region.

== Background ==
Established in 2014, LCDL hosts a number of unique materials significant to the slave trade in the United States, including the Hutson Lee Papers collection of broadsides from 1858 to 1865 slave auctions held in Charleston, and the account book of slave trader Alonzo J. White. The site also hosts a number of first-person narrative sources that contrast with the 20th-century marketing of Charleston, which "churned out mostly whitewashed and often blatantly false historical narratives." Recent grant funding has allowed for an increased quantity of oral history materials. According to professor B. J. Wood, "To an academic historian, putting three hundred years of disparate materials together in this way might seem to risk assuming ahistorical continuities. But attachments to place often make history more engaging to popular audiences, and few places in the United States have a more interesting or distinctive history than the Carolina low-country." In addition to the primary sources the site hosts a number of curated online exhibits.
