= Portia Club =

- U.S. National Register of Historic Places
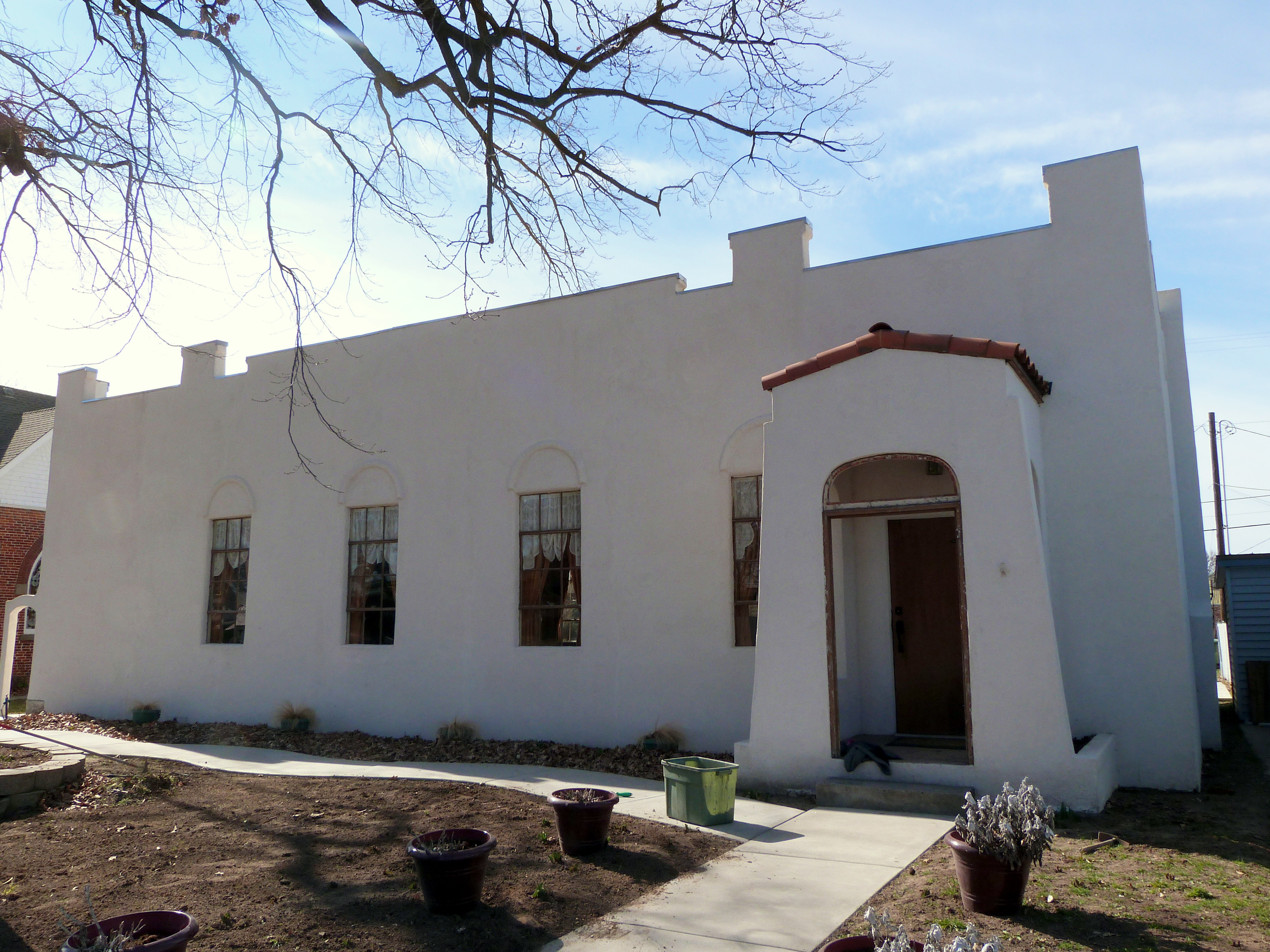

- Location within Idaho Location within the United States
- Location: 225 N. 9th St., Payette, Idaho
- Coordinates: 44°04′40″N 116°56′02″W
- Area: less than one acre
- Built: 1927
- Architect: I.C. Whitley
- Architectural style: Spanish Colonial Revival
- NRHP reference No.: 10000159
- Added to NRHP: April 7, 2010

The Portia Club is a women's club based in Payette, Idaho. Its clubhouse building, at 225 N. 9th St. in Payette, was built in 1927 and was listed on the National Register of Historic Places in 2010.

The club was formed in 1895. It was named for Portia, the beautiful and intelligent protagonist of Shakespeare's Merchant of Venice.

"They may have started their club over a small tea party in 1895, but during the next twenty years they started the Payette City Library, funded Children's Free Health Clinics, organized the Payette Apple Blossom Festival, sponsored lectures on laws that affected women and children, held debates on women's issues and spread the virtues of art and literature throughout the city of Payette, Idaho."

It joined the Idaho Federation of Women's Clubs in 1904 and later the General Federation of Women's Clubs.

Fundraising for a building started in 1919. Eventually more than $4000 was accumulated, and Fruitland, Idaho architect I.C. Whitley was hired to design it. He designed it in Spanish Colonial Revival style, which the architect had learned about in trip to southern California.

In 2005, the historic building was acquired by a 501c3 nonprofit, The Friends of the Portia Club, Inc., formed to restore and preserve it. It now serves as a community center and is available for rental.
