= Coughanour Apartment Block =

- U.S. National Register of Historic Places
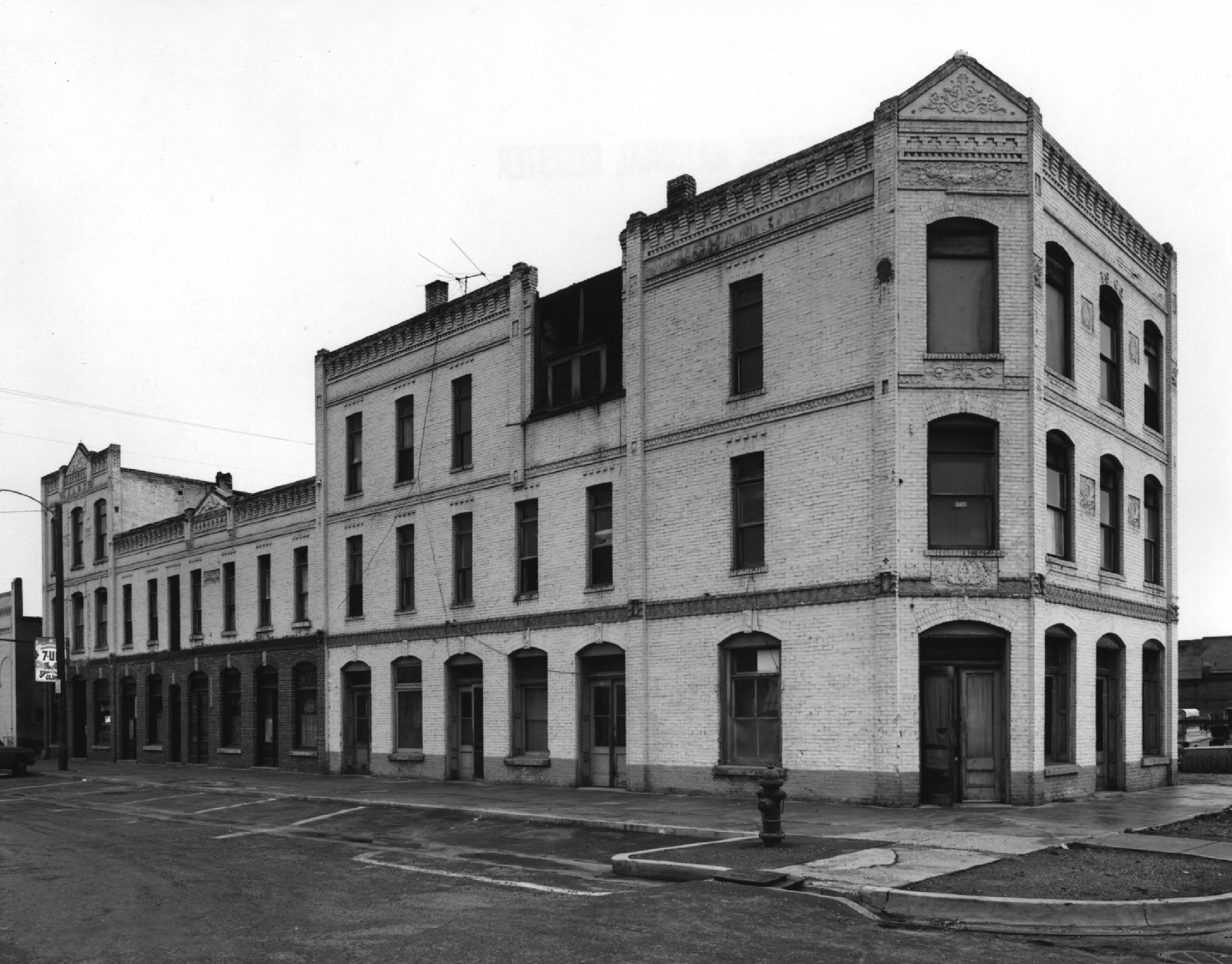

- Location within Idaho Location within the United States
- Location: 700-718 1st Ave., N., Payette, Idaho
- Coordinates: 44°4′33″N 116°56′4″W
- Area: less than one acre
- Built: 1902, 1905, 1907
- NRHP reference No.: 78001092
- Added to NRHP: May 23, 1978

The Coughanour Apartment Block was an apartment building in Payette, Idaho The building was built in three stages, in 1902, 1905, and 1907. It was listed on the National Register of Historic Places in 1978.

It is a three-story building with brick pilasters, a brick cornice, tin pediments and pressed tin plaques.

The building was demolished in 1985 and no longer exists.
