= Payette City Hall and Courthouse =

- U.S. National Register of Historic Places
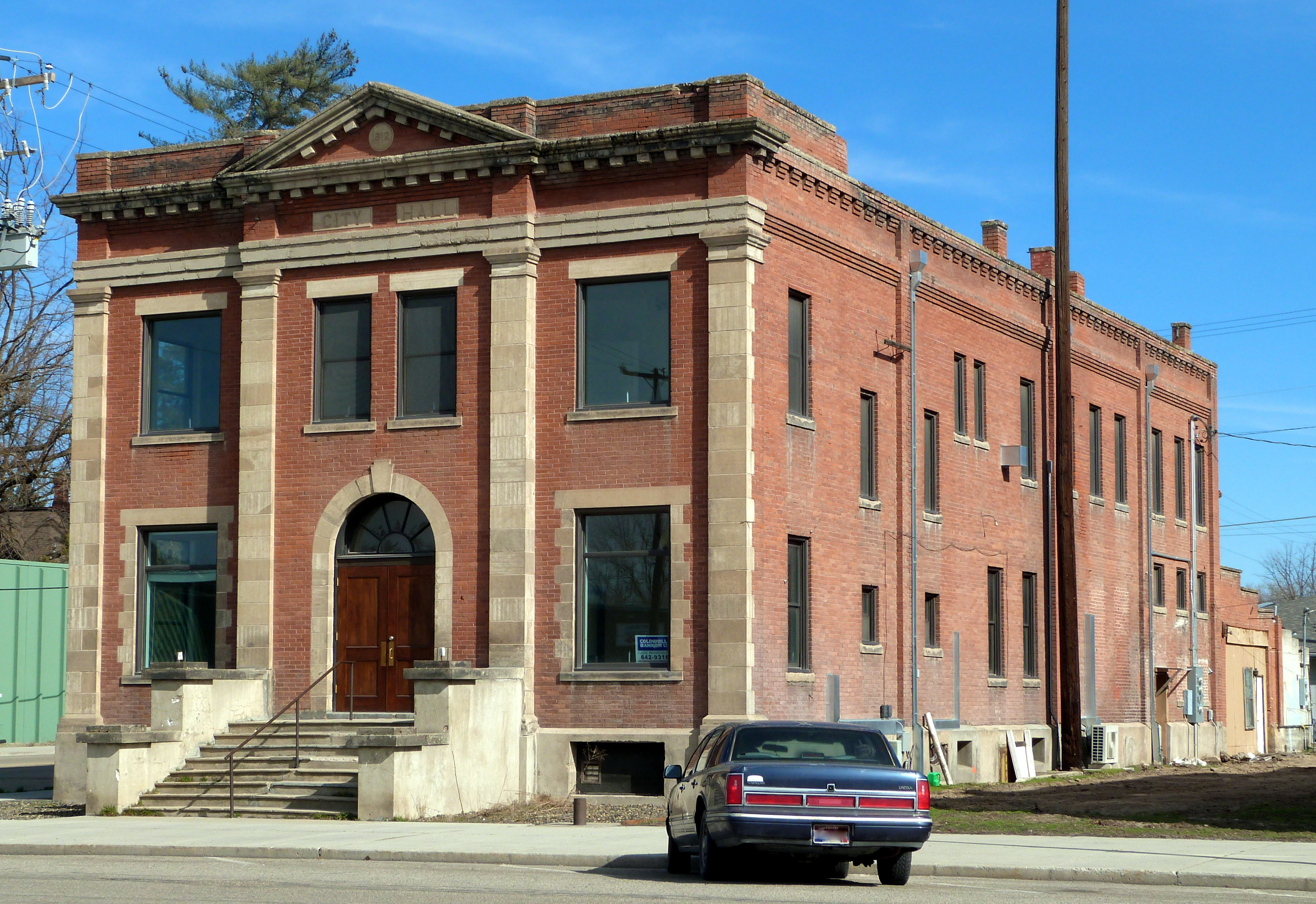

- Location within Idaho Location within the United States
- Location: 3rd Ave. and 8th St., Payette, Idaho
- Coordinates: 44°04′41″N 116°56′05″W
- Area: less than one acre
- Built: 1912
- Built by: J. Ronald Walker
- Architectural style: Classical Revival
- NRHP reference No.: 79000808
- Added to NRHP: May 14, 1979

The Payette City Hall and Courthouse, at 3rd Ave. and 8th St. in Payette, Idaho, was built in 1912. It was listed on the National Register of Historic Places in 1979.

It is a two-story brick building upon a raised foundation, built in Classical Revival style. It is three bays wide, with bays separated by terra cotta pilasters, and four bays deep. Its entry bay rises to a pedimented cornice. The builder was J. Ronald Walker.

It was deemed "architecturally significant as a good local example of the Neo-Classical Revival style in Payette. Although of modest scale and ornament, it nevertheless is one of the town's more outstanding structures and the major one in the downtown area to display Classical details and proportions. Situated at the end of Third Avenue, Payette's main street, it dominates the streetscape in the north end, and for many years served as a symbol of civic authority. Further contributing to the building's significance is its having functioned for a number of years as a seat of local government. Not only did it house the city government, but after the formation of Payette County in 1917 it also contained the county government."

The city offices moved out in the 1950s and the county offices moved out in the 1970s.
