= A. B. Moss Building =

- U.S. National Register of Historic Places
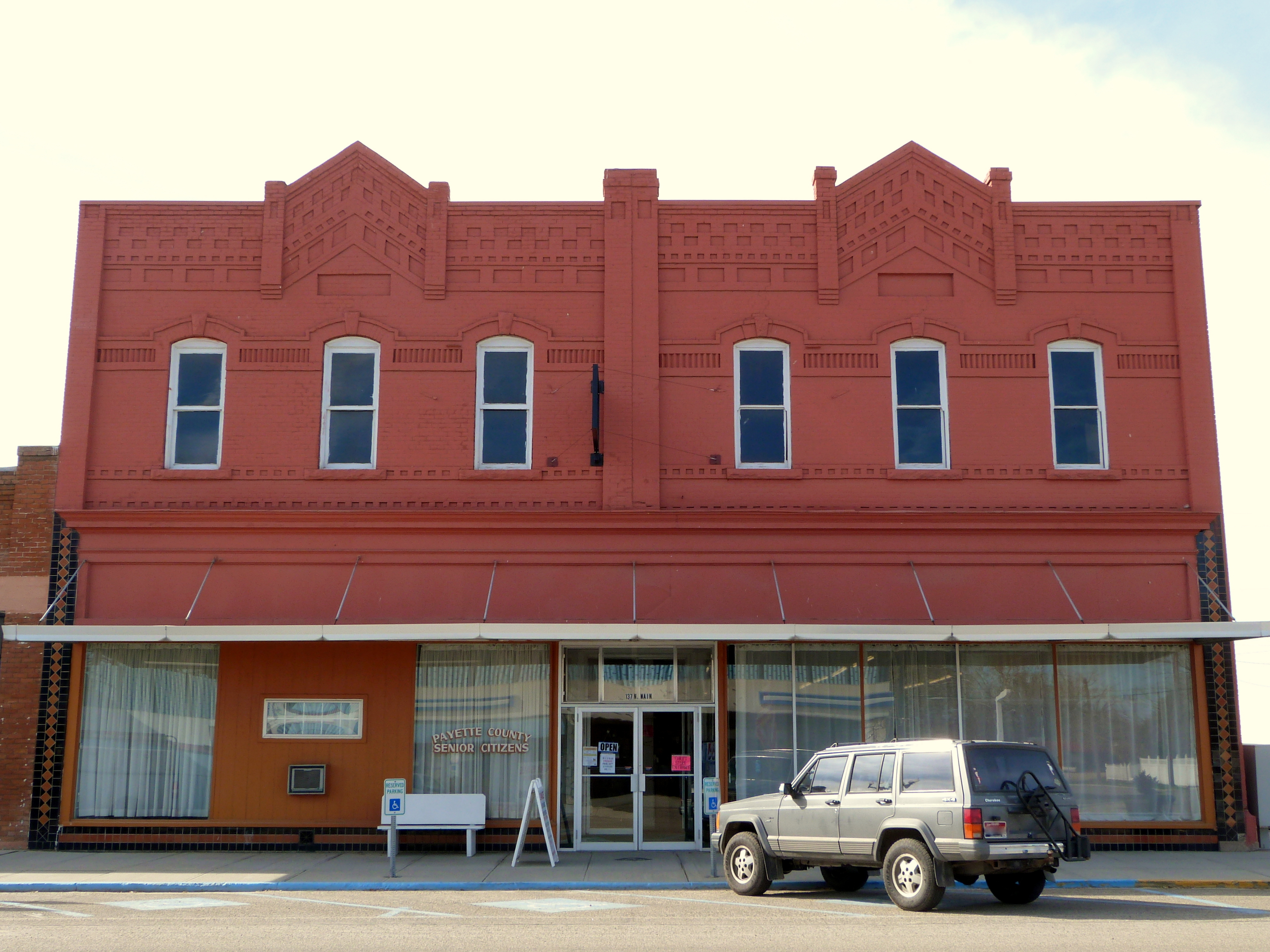

- Location within Idaho
- Location: 137 N. 8th St., Payette, Idaho
- Coordinates: 44°04′37″N 116°56′07″W
- Area: less than one acre
- Built: 1895
- Architectural style: Italianate, High Victorian Italianate
- NRHP reference No.: 78001093
- Added to NRHP: February 8, 1978

The A. B. Moss Building, at 137 N. 8th St. in Payette, Idaho, was built in 1895. It was listed on the National Register of Historic Places in 1978.

It is a brick two-story commercial building "which is distinguished by the two large brick 'chevrons' which break the roofline and function as false fronts for twin facade units. The 'chevrons' emerge from a unique banded brick ornamentation and are flanked by abbreviated piers which terminate with brick finials. The windows, which have cut stone sills and brick segmental arches with stone keystones, are united by a brick banding. The facade's first-story, with its recessed center doorway and border of black tiles with orange lozenges, was the result of a 1926 remodeling. Except for this, and a coat of green paint above, this building remains unaltered."

The building was deemed "architecturally significant for its unique brick ornamentation, which fits Marcus Whiffen's "High Victorian Italianate" classification. The brick banding and the two chevrons rising from it represent unusual craftsmanship in brick for its time and location. A. B. Moss is credited with founding Payette. He supplied the original ties for the Union Pacific Railroad by floating them down the Payette River to 'Boomerang' the name he gave to present day Payette. He was an extensive landholder in the area and was active in municipal government for many years."

At the time of National Register listing, the Moss family still owned this building, which was in use as a senior citizens center.

It was in 1881 when A. B. Moss came to the Payette valley, and in the next year he got a contract from the Oregon Short Line Railroad to supply 250,000 railroad ties. He and a brother established a railroad supply camp store in Payette which eventually became the Moss Mercantile Company, the largest store in the area.

It has also been known as Merchant Mercantile. It had a "Golden Rule Store" sign painted on its side in 1975.
