= Woodward House (Richmond, Virginia) =

Historic house in Virginia, United States

- U.S. National Register of Historic Places
- Virginia Landmarks Register
- Richmond City Historic District
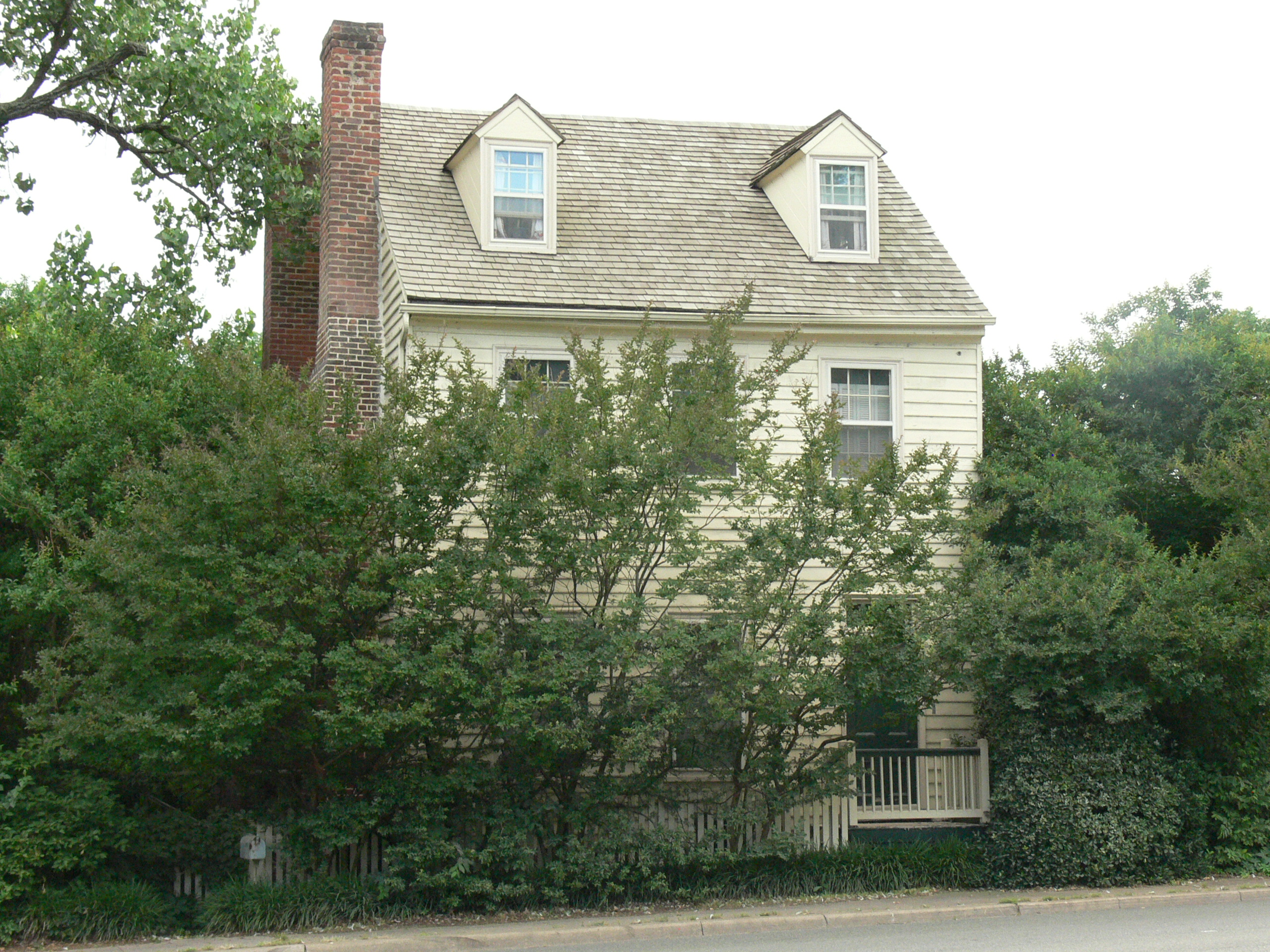
- Woodward House, May 2011

- Location within Virginia Location within the United States
- Location: 3017 Williamsburg Ave., Richmond, Virginia
- Coordinates: 37°31′28″N 77°25′1″W
- Area: less than one acre
- Built: 1782
- NRHP reference No.: 74002243
- VLR No.: 127-0119

Significant dates
- Added to NRHP: June 19, 1974
- Designated VLR: May 21, 1974

Woodward House is a historic home located in Richmond, Virginia. The original section was built about 1782. It was subsequently enlarged to a 2 1/2-story, three-bay, frame dwelling. It sits on a brick basement, has a dormered gable roof, and three exterior end chimneys. During the first two decades of the 19th century, it was the home of John Woodward, Captain of the Sloop Rachell, and other craft operating from "Rocketts."

It was listed on the National Register of Historic Places in 1974.
