= St. John's United Church of Christ (Payette, Idaho) =

- St. John's Church
- U.S. National Register of Historic Places
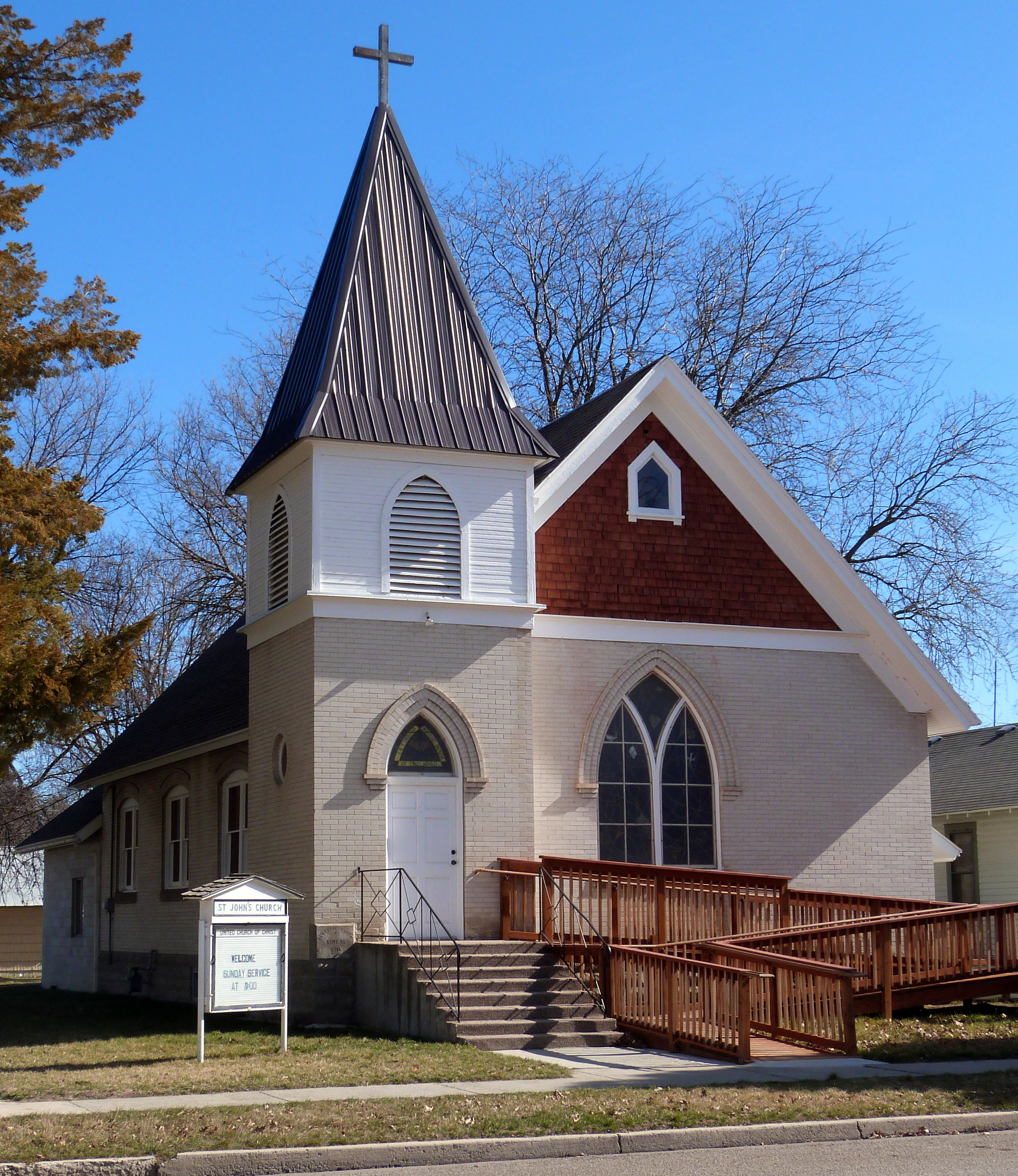

- Location within Idaho
- Location: 350 N. 4th St., Payette, Idaho
- Coordinates: 44°04′46″N 116°56′27″W
- Area: less than one acre
- Built: 1911
- Architectural style: Late Gothic Revival, Bungalow/craftsman
- NRHP reference No.: 13000353
- Added to NRHP: June 5, 2013

The St. John's Church in Payette, Idaho was built in 1911. It was listed on the National Register of Historic Places in 2013. It has also been known as the German Evangelical Lutheran Church.
