= Edwin Harleston =

American artist (1882-1931)

Edwin Augustus Harleston
- Born: 14 March 1882; Charleston, South Carolina, United States
- Died: 10 May 1931 (aged 49); Charleston, South Carolina
- Resting place: Unity and Friendship Cemetery
- Education: Avery Normal Institute
- Alma mater: Atlanta University
- Occupation: Artist
- Parents: Edwin Gaillard Harleston (father); Louisa Moultrie Harleston (mother)

Edwin Augustus Harleston (March 14, 1882 – May 10, 1931) was an American artist and founding president of the Charleston, South Carolina, branch of the National Association for the Advancement of Colored People. He is known for his realistic portraits of African Americans inspired by classical paintings. He was excluded from the whites-only artistic movement later known as the Charleston Renaissance.

== Personal life ==
He was born in Charleston, South Carolina, on March 14, 1882. He was one of five surviving children of Louisa Moultrie Harleston and Edwin Gaillard Harleston, a prosperous former coastal schooner captain who owned the Harleston Funeral Home. His mother traced her lineage through several generations of free people of color, while his father was descended from a white planter and one of his slaves. His family referred to him as "Teddy" to distinguish him from his father.

Harleston won a scholarship to study at the Avery Normal Institute, from which he graduated as valedictorian in 1900. He went on to Atlanta University, where he studied chemistry and sociology and took courses under W. E. B. Du Bois, who became a lifelong friend. After graduating in 1904, Harleston stayed on for a year as a teaching assistant in both sociology and chemistry while planning the next step in his education. He was admitted to Harvard University, but instead choose to attend the School of the Museum of Fine Arts, Boston. Edwin also attended the Art Institute of Chicago over the summers of 1924 and 1925. All of his art teachers were white.

Harleston returned to South Carolina in 1913 to help his father run the family funeral home, continuing to do so until 1931, the year both he and his father died. To work in mortuary science, his father paid for him to attend the Renouard School for Embalmers in Manhattan. Though he hated the school, he still achieved top marks in his class. His then girlfriend (later wife), Elise Forrest, moved to Long Island, working at the Howard Orphanage on Long Island, to be close to him until he returned home to Charleston in 1917. He became active in local civil rights groups and in 1917 became founding president of Charleston's newly formed branch of the NAACP. One campaign he led succeeded in getting the local public school system to hire Black teachers.

On October 12, 1918, Harleston received a draft notice but was never called up. Two of his brothers were called up to training for the war. Edwin, who was still working in the funeral business, painted portraits of Black soldiers. His brother Robert Othello Harleston was never sent abroad but returned home with tuberculosis, which spread to his wife. At 37, Edwin Harleston adopted his niece Gussie when her parents were sent to tuberculosis homes. After her adoptive father's death, she changed her name to Edwina Augusta in his memory. Edwina Harleston Whitlock provided more than seventy-five hours of oral interviews for The Sweet Hell Inside: The Rise of an Elite Black Family in the South that would record much information about the life of Edwin A. Harleston and his family.

== Education ==
Being from one of the few Black elite families in Charleston, South Carolina at the time, Edwin Harleston attended a private school called the Avery Normal Institute. His senior year, Harleston created a painting titled Lincoln and His Cabinet. This painting is lost but establishes an early interest in painting scenes associated with Southern Black culture. Edwin would then go on to attend Atlanta University as an undergraduate student. Despite Atlanta University not offering an art program, Harleston continued to draw and paint. In 1904, he would play the lead in a production titled "The Shadow." It was while attending this school that Edwin met W.E.B. Du Bois, who emphasized to Harleston that he should use his privilege for "service and duty to the race."

Despite the unpromising industry of Black-painted portraits, Harleston pushed to study painting at Harvard University. After receiving his acceptance letter to Harvard, Harleston visited Cambridge in the summer of 1905. Harvard required him to register as an undergraduate, but he declined Harvard's offer of acceptance because the school offered only Art Theory and Art History courses. He decided instead to apply to the School of the Museum of Fine Arts, Boston. There he studied under the painters William McGregor Paxton and Frank Weston Benson from 1906 to December 1912. He studied alongside Phillip Hale, who would later use Harleston as a reference for a painting photographed in the Boston Post. Harleston studied anatomy under Edmund Tarbell. Edwin studied landscape painting at the Art Institute of Chicago over two summers.

While studying at the School of the Museum of Fine Arts in Boston, Harleston was the only Black student in a class of 84 students. Not only that, he was from the South while a majority of his peers were from the North. Boston's surplus of art museums, affording a level of access he did not experience in his home town of Charleston, allowed Harleston to develop his style and techniques inspired from artists such as Rembrandt.

== Art career ==
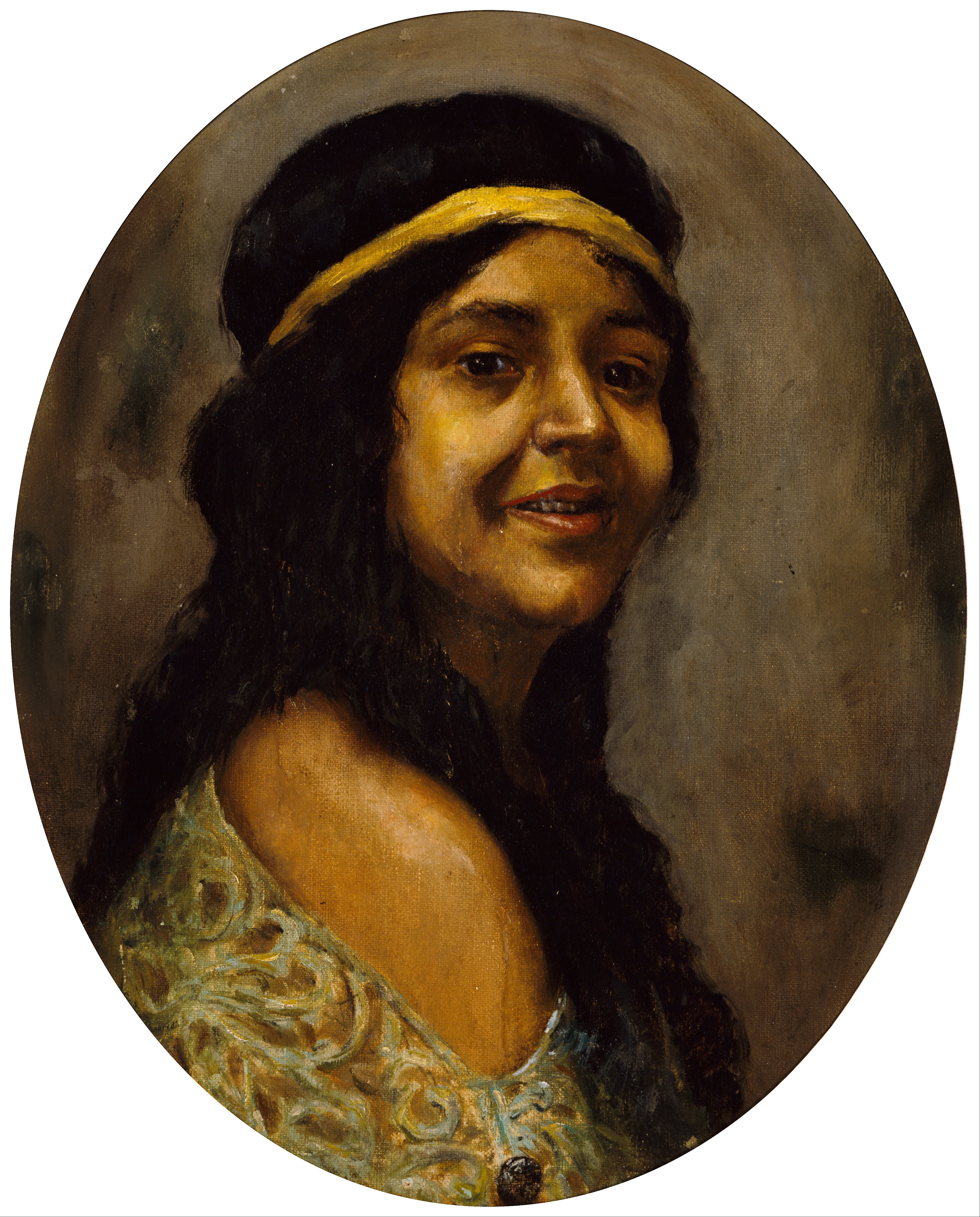
Edwin Harleston, Portrait of a Woman, oil on canvas, 1920.

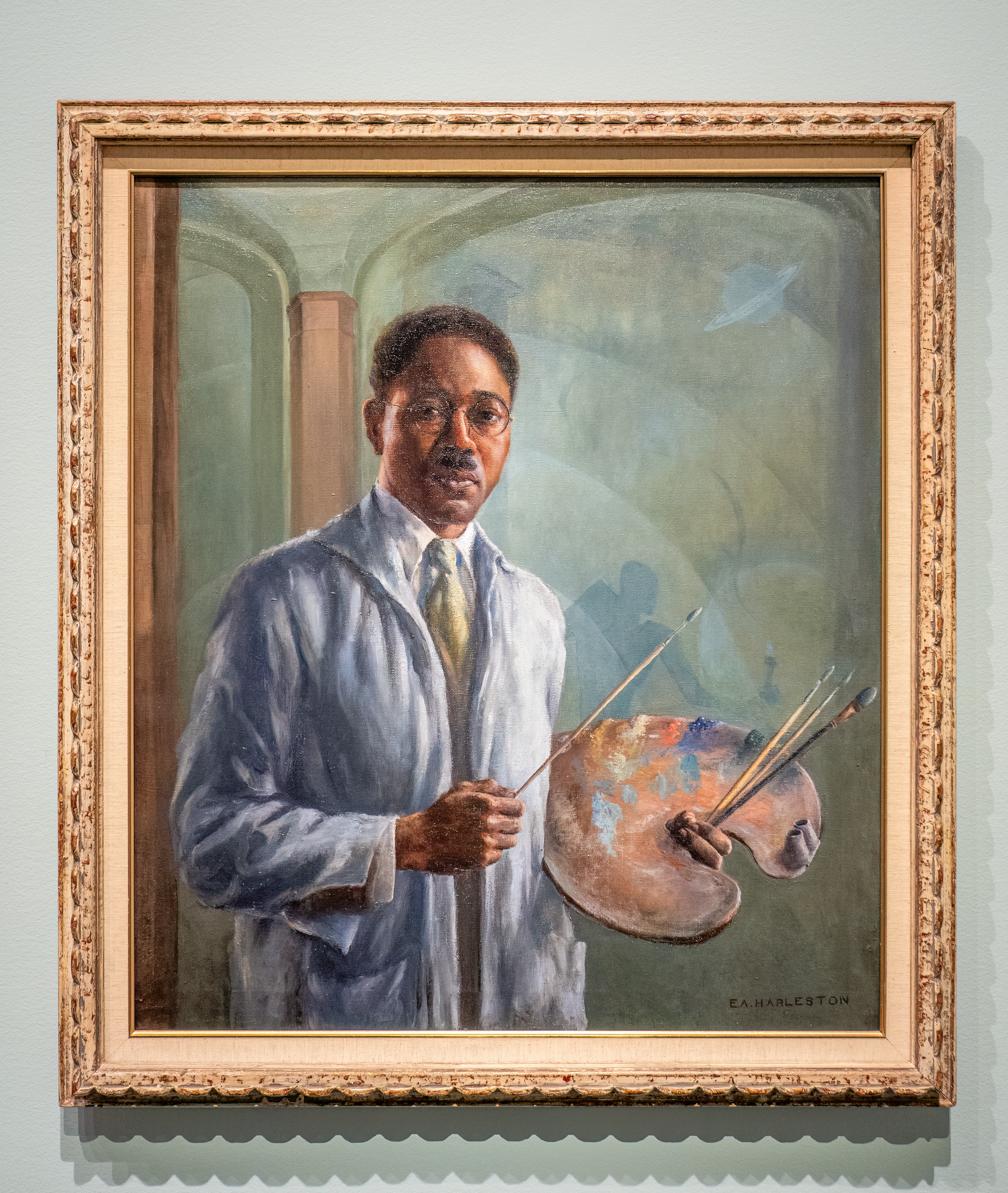
Portrait of Aaron Douglas (1930), featured in the Harlem Renaissance and Transatlantic Modernism exhibition at the Metropolitan Museum of Art

Harleston painted in a realist style that was influenced by both his Boston training and his wife Elise Forrest Harleston's photographic work. He mostly painted portraits, often on commission, and his sitters included notables such as Grace Towns, who later became the first African-American woman elected to the Georgia General Assembly; philanthropist Pierre S. du Pont; and Edward Twitchell Ware, a former president of Atlanta University. Harleston struggled to maintain a consistent artistic career while working for his father but returned to art in his thirties after meeting Elise Forrest. When he returned to painting, he was pleased to find his skills from school were still intact and painted his family members. He also painted genre scenes of the daily life of Charleston's African-American citizens, especially its rising middle class, as well as landscapes of South Carolina Lowcountry. Out of step with the rising modernism of the 1920s, he saw himself as continuing in the tradition of Henry Ossawa Tanner by portraying Black people and their lives realistically instead of as caricatures or stereotypes. Harleston was described by W. E. B. Du Bois as the "leading portrait painter of the race" even though his responsibility for helping to run the funeral home meant he could never devote himself to being an artist full-time.

In 1920, Harleston married photographer Elise Forrest, with whom he opened a studio across the street from the funeral home. This studio, which had both workspace and a public gallery to promote their artwork, was the first such public art establishment for Charleston's African-American citizens. Harleston often used Elise's photographs as the basis of his paintings and drawings; one of his best-known works, Miss Sue Bailey with the African Shawl, is based on a photograph by Elise. A three-quarter length seated portrait in dark colors and muted light, the painting exemplifies Harleston's commitment to portraying his sitters with dignity. Edwin was actually so pleased with the painting that he entered it in the 1930 Harmon Foundation Awards competition.

In the summer of 1930, Harleston traveled to Nashville, Tennessee to help artist Aaron Douglas paint his Symbolic Negro History murals for Fisk University; these are now considered among Douglas's most important works. This project was completed in October 1930, seven months before Harleston died. While at Fisk, Harleston painted Douglas's portrait with the unfinished mural in the background, typically emphasizing the sitter's profession and character while avoiding any suggestion of the picturesque. This mural is vastly different from his usual painting style, which consisted of muted colors like those seen in the painting of Miss Sue Bailey with the African Shawl. The colors he used in the mural showcase a much more vibrant range of shade, which display his range as an artist and the way he could adjust to work with other artists.

Harleston won a number of awards for his work, including the top prize in NAACP-sponsored contests in 1925 (A Colored Grand Army Man) and 1931 (Ouida) and the William E. Harmon Foundation's Alain Locke Prize for portrait painting, also in 1931 (The Old Servant).

Despite this modest success, Harleston was largely excluded from the dominantly white artistic circles of the Charleston Renaissance with which his work is today associated. Only writer Julia Peterkin, who won a Pulitzer Prize for her writing about African-American life, appears to have visited Harleston. Although writer DuBose Heyward based a character on him in his novel Mamba's Daughters, it seems they never met in person. Racial prejudice and segregation thwarted several potential commissions and blocked a planned 1926 exhibition of his work at the Charleston Museum that had been organized by museum director Laura Bragg and promoted by the city's mayor, Thomas Porcher Stoney.

By 1930, commissions were drying up and the funeral home business was suffering due to the Great Depression. Harleston undertook a series of lecture/demonstrations at Black colleges to earn money.

On April 21, 1931, Harleston's father died of pneumonia, and Harleston himself (who is said to have kissed his dying father on the lips) succumbed to the same ailment nineteen days later at the age of 49.

== Legacy ==
Harleston's paintings are in the collections of the Gibbes Museum of Art (Charleston), the Avery Research Center for African American History and Culture (Charleston), the Savannah College of Art and Design Museum in Savannah, Georgia, and the California African American Museum.

In 2026, the first comprehensive biography of Harleston was released, A Dream Deferred, by M. Akua McDaniel the founding director of the Spelman College Museum of Fine Art.

Harleston's papers are held by the South Carolina Historical Society and Emory University's Stuart A. Rose Manuscript, Archives, and Rare Book Library.
