= Center for Digital Imaging Arts at Boston University =

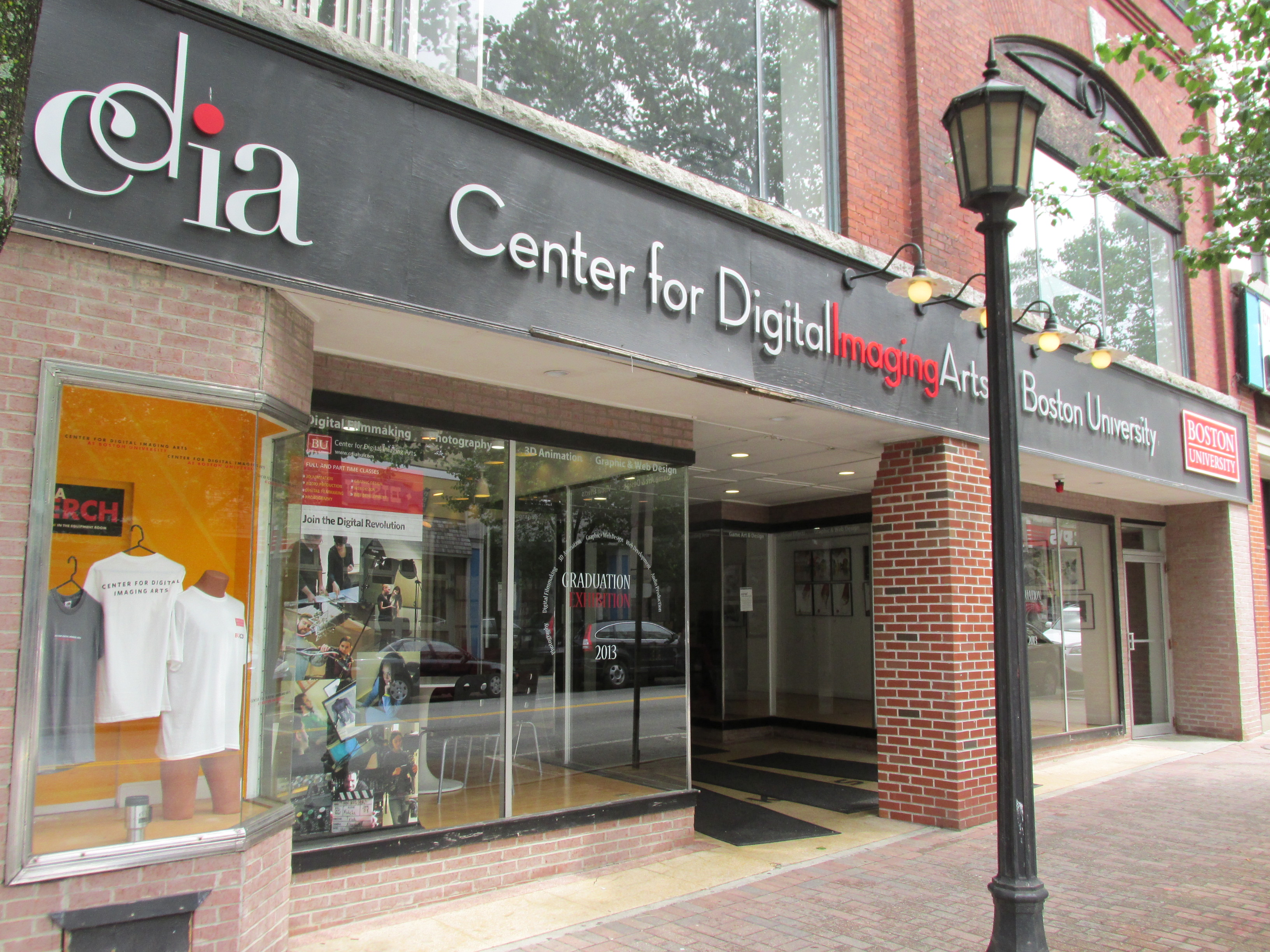
Center for Digital Imaging Arts

The Boston University Center for Digital Imaging Arts at Boston University focused on career-oriented education and training in the rapidly emerging digital arts fields of digital filmmaking, photography, 3D animation, graphic and web design, audio production and web development.

== Campuses ==
The Center for Digital Imaging Arts had three campuses — the Waltham, Massachusetts campus was located near the Charles River on Moody Street in Waltham, Massachusetts, Washington, DC campus was located in Georgetown, and another campus in Atlanta, Georgia. CDIA also offered workshops in Prague.

== History ==
The Boston University College of Communication developed the arts center as its "new digital imaging arts program." Bob Daniels (Boston University College of Communication’70, Boston University School of Education’76, Boston University School of Management’79), the program's executive director, began his career as a staff photographer for The Patriot Ledger in Quincy and was later executive director of Boston University's Corporate Education Center. The center's certificate programs and workshops were initially designed to complement the College of Communication’s degree programs. Boston University College of Communication's Waltham-based campus since expanded the university's integration with technology.

Boston University decided to terminate its support for the program leading to the center's closing in 2014.
