= Grant Whitney House =

- U.S. National Register of Historic Places
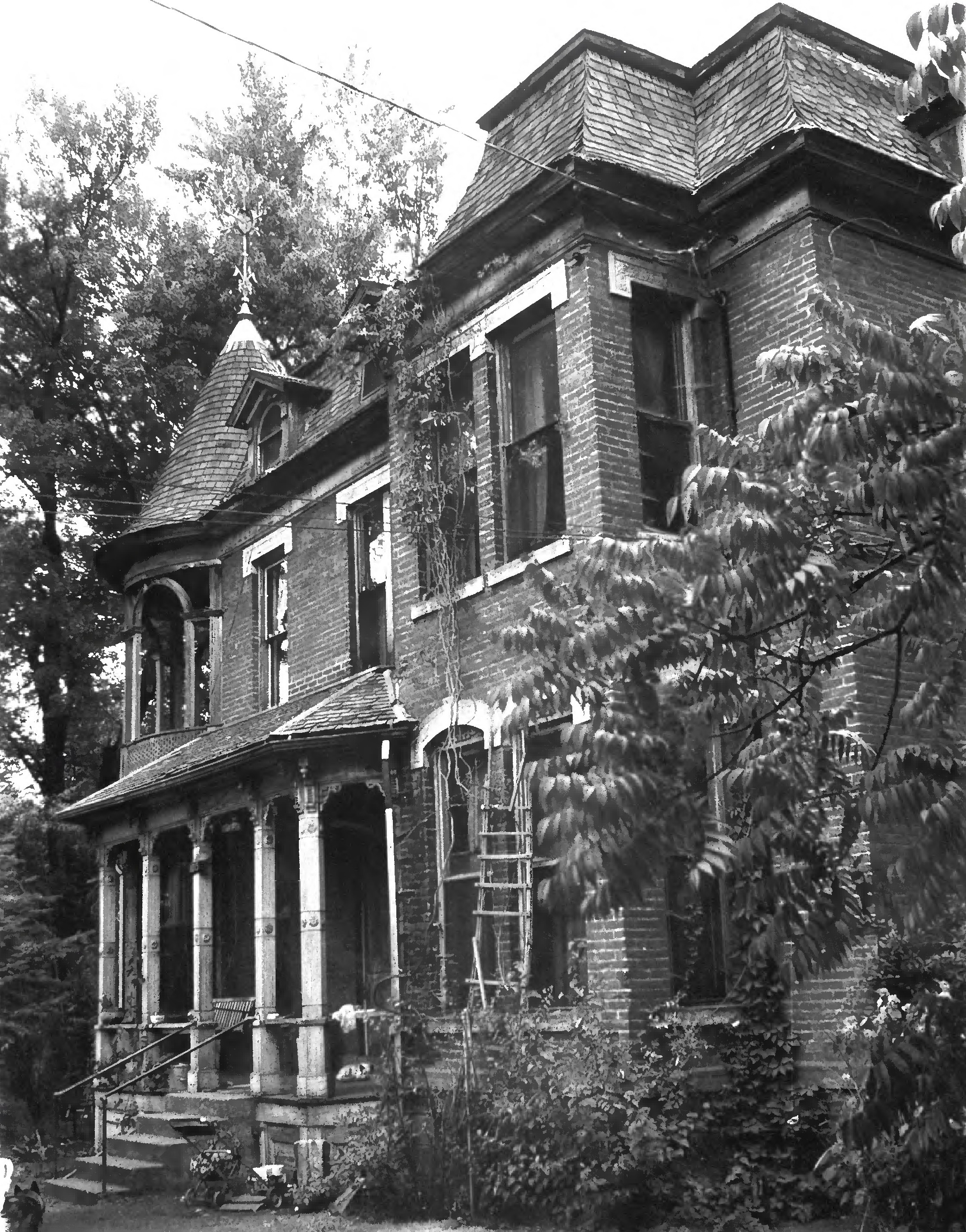
- Front view, in 1975

- Location within Idaho Location within the United States
- Location: 1015 7th Ave., N., Payette, Idaho
- Coordinates: 44°04′56″N 116°55′54″W
- Area: less than one acre
- Built: 1890
- Built by: Campbell, Walter
- Architectural style: Queen Anne, Second Empire architecture
- NRHP reference No.: 78001095
- Added to NRHP: February 23, 1978

The Grant Whitney House, in Payette, Idaho, was built in 1890. It was listed on the National Register of Historic Places in 1978.

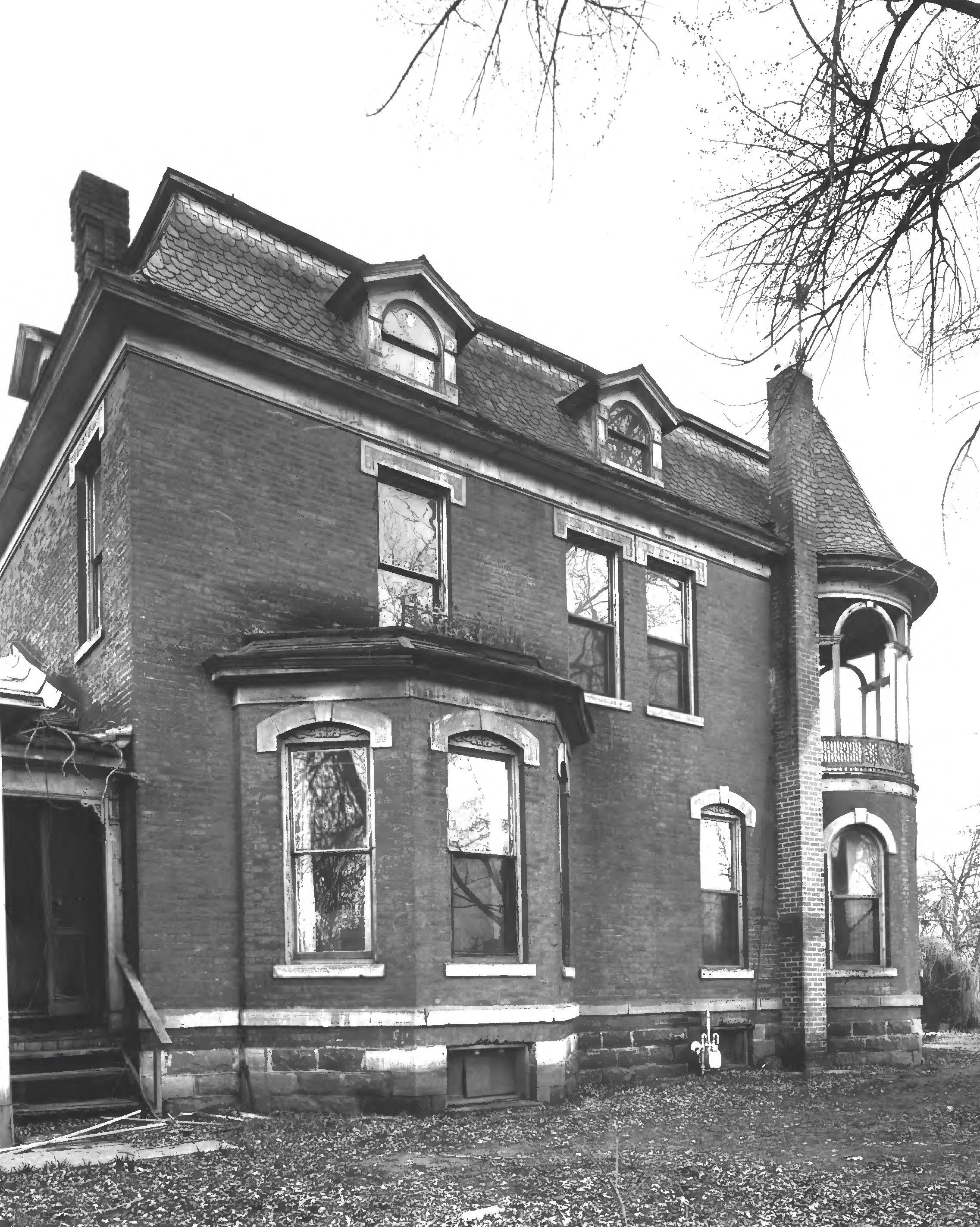
Side view, from 1978

It is a brick house built in Queen Anne style, and was unusual within that style (and perhaps especially in Idaho) for incorporating a mansard roof. (Note: Mansard roofs, with dormer windows as here, are integral to the Second Empire style, and it could be objectively said that this house was a mix of Queen Anne and this contemporary style. "Second Empire" is not mentioned in the NRHP nomination document, but is coded within the NRIS database for it.) Queen Anne features include its irregular massing and its turret topped by a conical roof.

A person named Walter Campbell is identified as its architect or builder.

The house no longer exists, at least not at that location, and there is no information available saying it was moved. It was located at 1015 7th Ave., N., in Payette.
