= Edward Harleston =

American politician (1794–1871)

Personal details
- Born: December 25, 1794 Charleston, South Carolina, U.S.
- Died: February 11, 1871 (aged 76) Charleston, South Carolina, U.S.
- Spouse(s): Georgianna W. Doughty (m. 1818) Ann Isabella Huger (m. 1826)
- Children: 13
- Education: Yale College
- Occupation: Politician; planter

Edward Harleston (December 25, 1794 – February 11, 1871) was an American planter and politician.

== Early life ==
Edward Harleston was born on December 25, 1794, in Charleston, South Carolina, to Annabella (née Moultrie) and Edward Harleston. His maternal grandfather was James Moultrie, lieutenant governor and chief justice of British East Florida. He was prepared for college by Christopher Edwards Gadsden. He graduated from Yale College in 1815.

== Career ==
Harleston was a planter of rice and cotton.

Harleston served in the South Carolina State Legislature for several years.

== Personal life ==
Harleston married Georgianna W. Doughty on March 3, 1818. They had three children, Edward Wentworth, Selina Doughty, and Cecilia Stanton. He married Ann Isabella Huger of Charleston on January 26, 1826. They had 10 children, Annabella Moultrie, Lucy, Elizabeth Huger, John, Cecilia Moultrie, Edward, Hannah, Frank Huger, Frances Motte, and Mary Huger.

Harleston died on February 11, 1871, at his "The Villa" home on the Cooper River in Charleston.
