= New Plymouth Congregational Church =

Historic church in Idaho, United States

- U.S. National Register of Historic Places
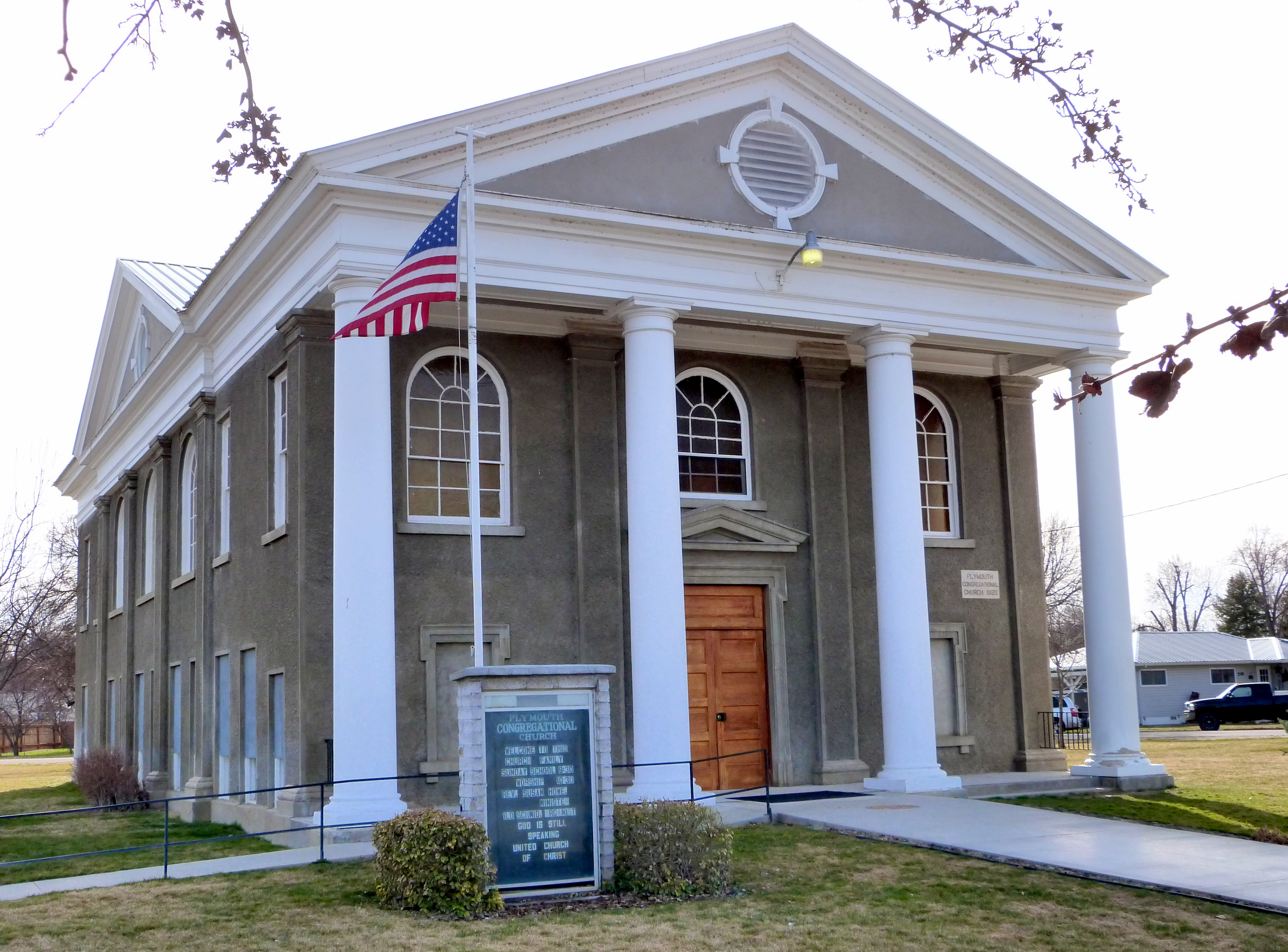
- The New Plymouth Congregational Church in 2015

- Location within Idaho Location within the United States
- Location: 207 Southwest Ave. New Plymouth, Idaho
- Coordinates: 43°58′08″N 116°49′17″W
- Area: less than one acre
- Built: 1920
- Architect: Tourtellotte & Hummel
- Architectural style: Classical Revival, Neo-Classical revival
- MPS: Tourtellotte and Hummel Architecture TR
- NRHP reference No.: 82000359
- Added to NRHP: November 17, 1982

The New Plymouth Congregational Church is a historic church on Southwest Avenue between West Park and Plymouth in New Plymouth, Idaho. It was built in 1920 and was added to the National Register in 1982.

A review by the Idaho State Historical Society identifies that "The New Plymouth Congregational Church is architecturally significant as a full—scale, monumentally porticoed and pedimented neo-classical revival church which is the outstanding structure in New Plymouth, and which is related to that town's unusual history."
