= Plymouth Church Seattle =

Church in Seattle, Washington, United States

Coordinates: 47°36′32″N 122°19′58″W

Plymouth Congregational Church is a historic congregation located in downtown Seattle and associated with the United Church of Christ denomination. Plymouth is known for its history of social justice advocacy, music and its creation of programs to serve the homeless, such as Plymouth Healing Communities and Plymouth Housing. The Rev. Dr. Kelle Brown is the Senior Pastor. She leads collaboratively with associate pastor Rev. Kevin Bechtold.

== History ==
Plymouth Congregational Church began in 1869 when founders first met above a drug store in Pioneer Square. The congregation moved to its own land when Arthur Denny donated a parcel for the church on the corner of Second Ave and Spring Street. Captain William Renton contributed lumber for the first church building, which was dedicated in 1873. In 1885, a sense of agitation against Chinese immigrant laborers arose in Seattle. President Grover Cleveland issued a proclamation instructing citizens to observe the rights of Chinese inhabitants. Sunday morning, February 7, Reverend Bates, pastor of Plymouth, and several other Plymouth members, joined the Home Guard in an attempt to protect Chinese immigrants during the Seattle riot of 1886.

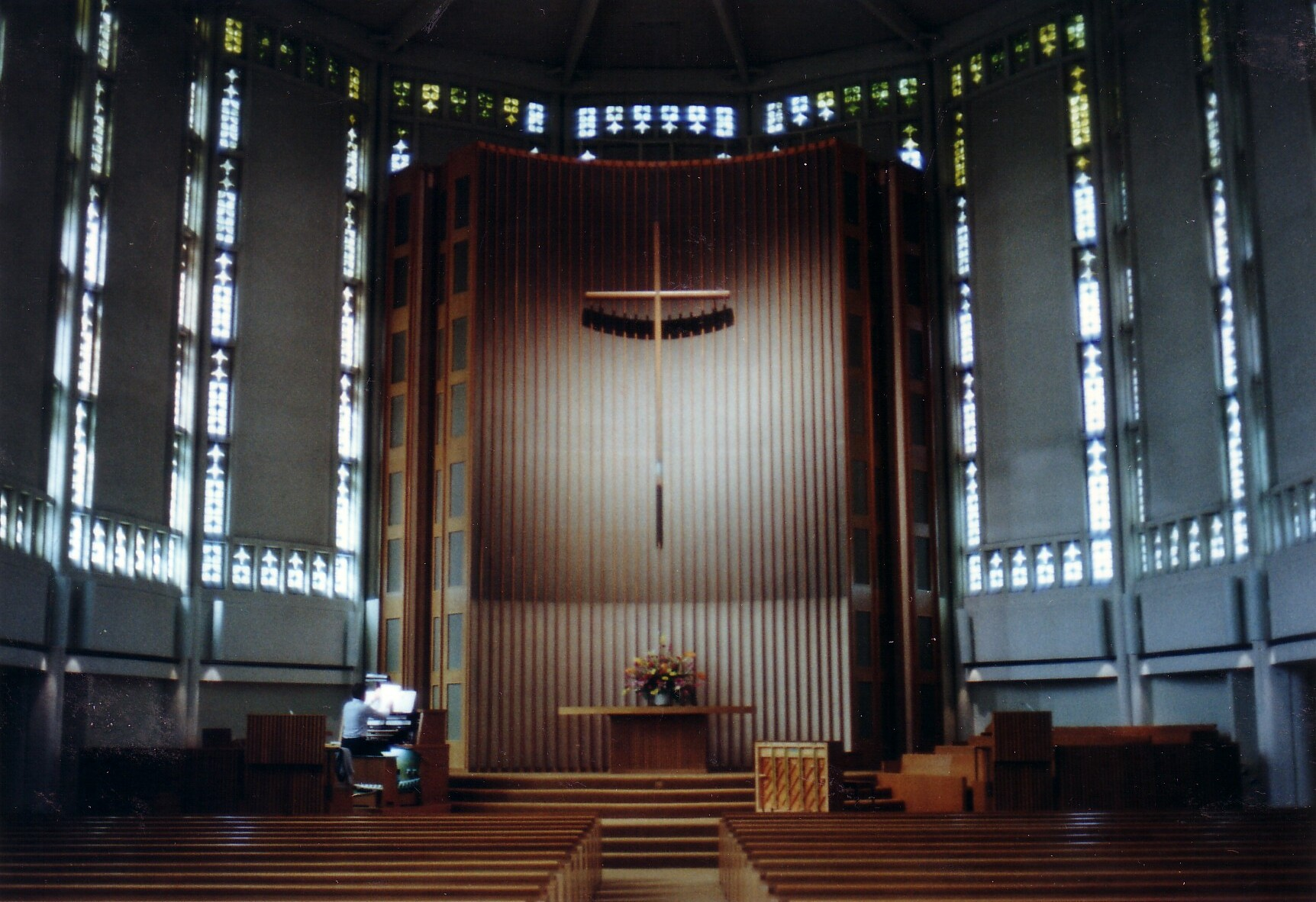
Interior of Plymouth Congregational Church prior to renovation completed in 2015.

After the Great Seattle fire of June 6, 1889, Plymouth Church began rebuilding plans. The church sold its corner lot to purchase two lots on Third and University. As the City of Seattle recovered from the fire and grew in population, so did the church. In the decade following the fire, the church became “the social and cultural center of that day.” In 1909 Plymouth hosted the National American Woman Suffrage Association Convention with Charlotte Perkins Gilman addressing the issue from the Plymouth pulpit. Plymouth Church was chosen as the host site because, "The pastor, Rev. F. J. VanHorn, D.D., and the Board of Trustees are all in sympathy with the woman suffrage movement, and have given substantial evidence of their interest by making exception to their rule in extending to us the hospitality of this commodious and convenient structure." Plymouth outgrew its location on Third and University and moved to its current location at Sixth Avenue and University Street. The building on Sixth and University was dedicated in 1912.

In the 1930s, Plymouth developed a radio presence with broadcasts of annual performances of Handel’s Messiah as well as Sunday morning and evening services led by Reverend Dr. Wendell Fifield. In 1961, The Reverend Dr. Martin Luther King Jr made his only visit to Seattle. When the original church host withdrew their offer, Plymouth offered the use of its facility for a reception for the Reverend Dr. King's visit. Because of the church's local prominence and national exposure, Plymouth was ranked among the fastest-growing churches.

The church building was damaged in the 1965 Puget Sound earthquake and was demolished the following year in order to pave the way for the current church structure. The four entrance columns were salvaged and stand today in Plymouth Pillars Park at the corner of Pike and Boren. During the year of rebuilding, the church held Sunday services in the nearby 5th Avenue Theater. In 1967, the current building was dedicated.

In 1980, the Reverend David Colwell challenged the church to end homelessness in downtown Seattle. His proclamation, "one homeless person is one too many,” became the rallying cry as church members responded and created what has now become the Plymouth Housing. Plymouth Housing Group is an independent, non-profit organization that has grown to be one of the largest developers and operators of low-income housing for homeless people in Seattle.

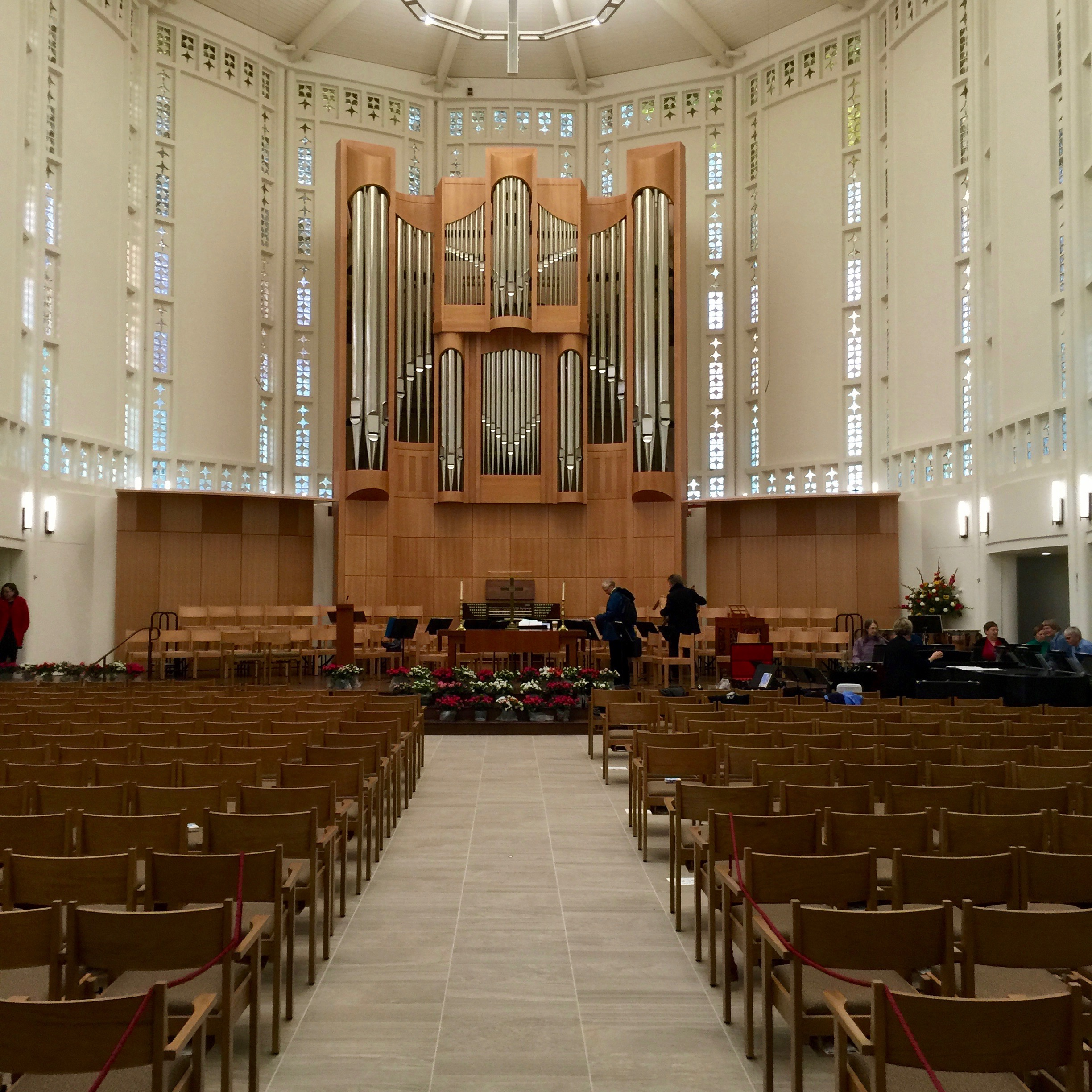
The renovated sanctuary of Plymouth Church Seattle UCC offers a C.B. Fisk, Opus 140, tracker organ and a new energy efficient lighting system.

In the summer of 2014, Plymouth Church began a project to renovate the sanctuary. The chief concern of the project was to replace the original pipe organ that had been damaged during the 6.8 Nisqually earthquake that hit the Puget Sound region at 10:54 am PST (18:54 UTC) on Ash Wednesday, February 28, 2001. The organ has been replaced with a new tracker organ, Opus 140, built and installed by C.B. Fisk Inc. in Gloucester, Massachusetts. The renovation project also involved repairing major structural damage to the Nave's roof trusses. It addressed acoustical problems with the space and saw the installation of a new energy-efficient lighting system. The new organ was inaugurated with a series of concerts in fall/winter 2015-16.

Additionally, with the 2014-15 renovation, the congregation opted to replace carpeting and traditional pews, with Italian tile flooring and chairs. The choice of pew chairs opened the use of the space to nearly any configuration desired, including worship, vocal and instrumental concerts, theatrical presentations, dance, forums, or banquets. The freedom to choose configurations again allows a center aisle for weddings.

== Current activities ==
Plymouth Church Seattle continues its commitment and history of social justice. Pastors and church members were active in efforts to approve Referendum 74 in Washington state which legalized same-sex marriage. Currently, Plymouth Church UCC is doing the internal work of anti-oppression with a focus on antiracism. Faithful to its progressive values, Plymouth pledges to sustain ecumenical and interfaith relationships, particularly to Jewish and Muslim communities; to pursue justice for queer, trans, non-binary and gender fluid persons and communities; and to respond faithfully to the reversal of Roe versus Wade by advocating for reproductive justice. Additionally, the church supports the following movements: Poor People's Campaign: A National Call for a Moral Revival; the Duwamish Tribe and their quest for federal recognition; the Black Lives Matter movement
