= Woodward Building (Payette, Idaho) =

- U.S. National Register of Historic Places
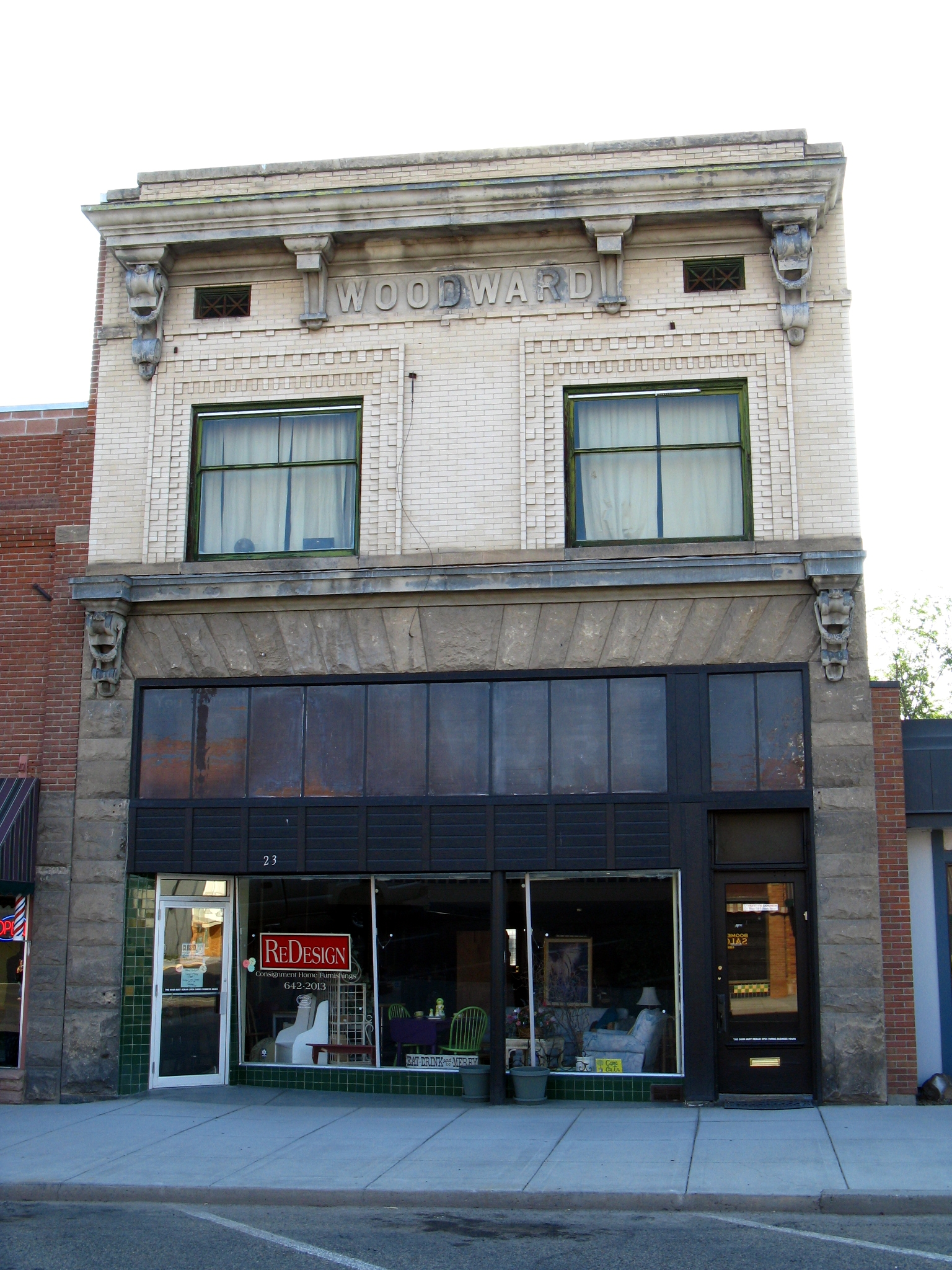
- The building in 2008

- Location within Idaho Location within the United States
- Location: 23 8th Street, Payette, Idaho
- Coordinates: 44°04′28″N 116°56′01″W
- Area: less than one acre
- Built: 1908
- Architect: John E. Tourtellotte & Company
- NRHP reference No.: 78001096
- Added to NRHP: April 26, 1978

The Woodward Building is a historic two-story building in Payette, Idaho. It was designed by John E. Tourtellotte & Company with "ornate metal cornices" by Charles Oscar Kirkendall, and built in 1908 for Dr. 0. C. Woodward, a physician.

It has a cavetto between its first and second stories, with modillions at each end.

It has been listed on the National Register of Historic Places since April 26, 1978.
