= Avery Research Center for African American History and Culture =

Library in Charleston, South Carolina

Coordinates: 32.7804961°N 79.9446713°W

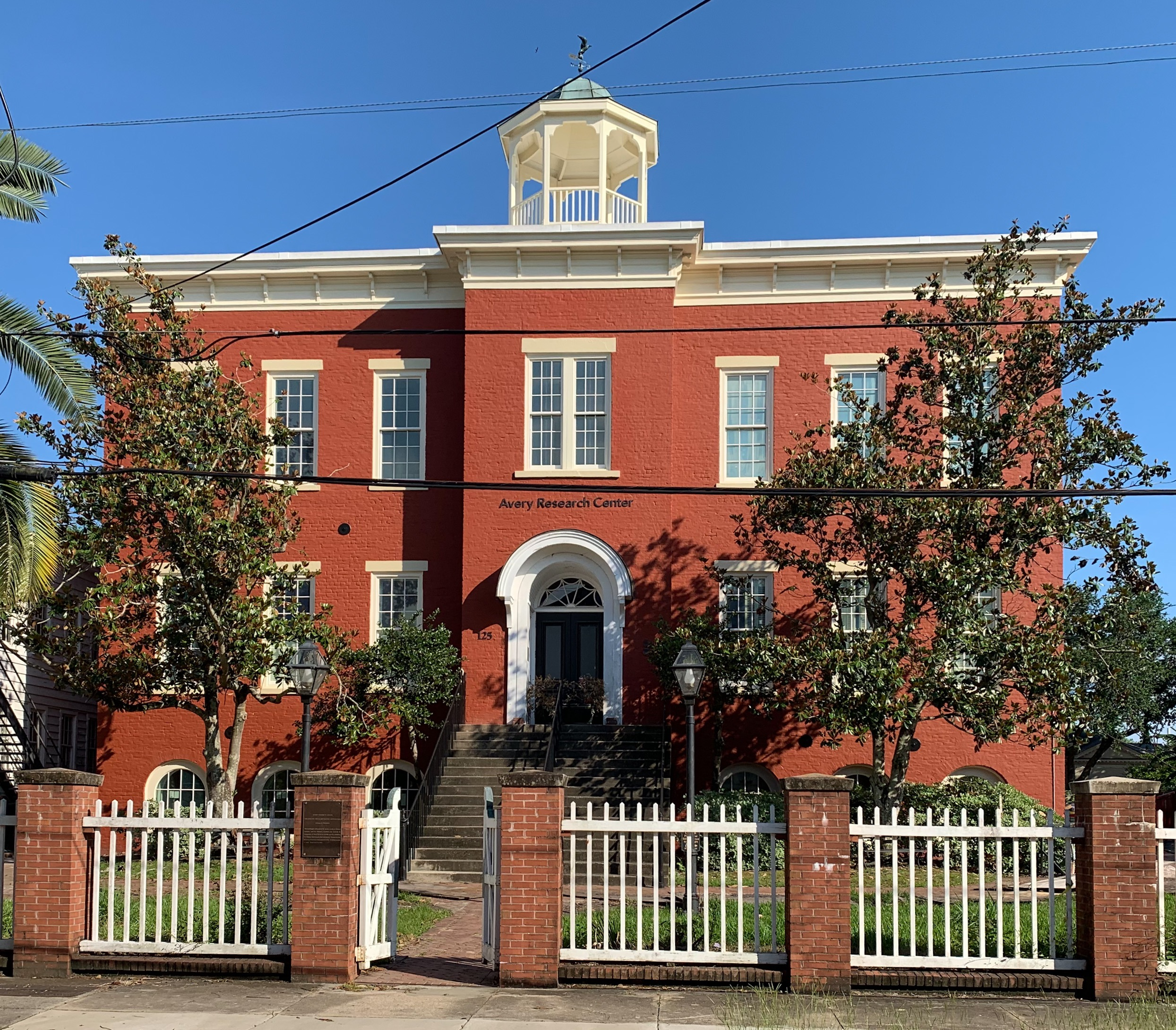
- The Avery Research Center, 2019
- Location: Charleston, South Carolina, USA
- Type: Research Centre
- Scope: African American History and Culture
- Established: 1985
- Branch of: College of Charleston

Collection
- Items collected: Materials that document the history, traditions, legacies, and influences of African Americans
- Size: Over six thousand items
- Criteria for collection: The history and culture of African Americans in Charleston, the South Carolina Lowcountry, and South Carolina at large

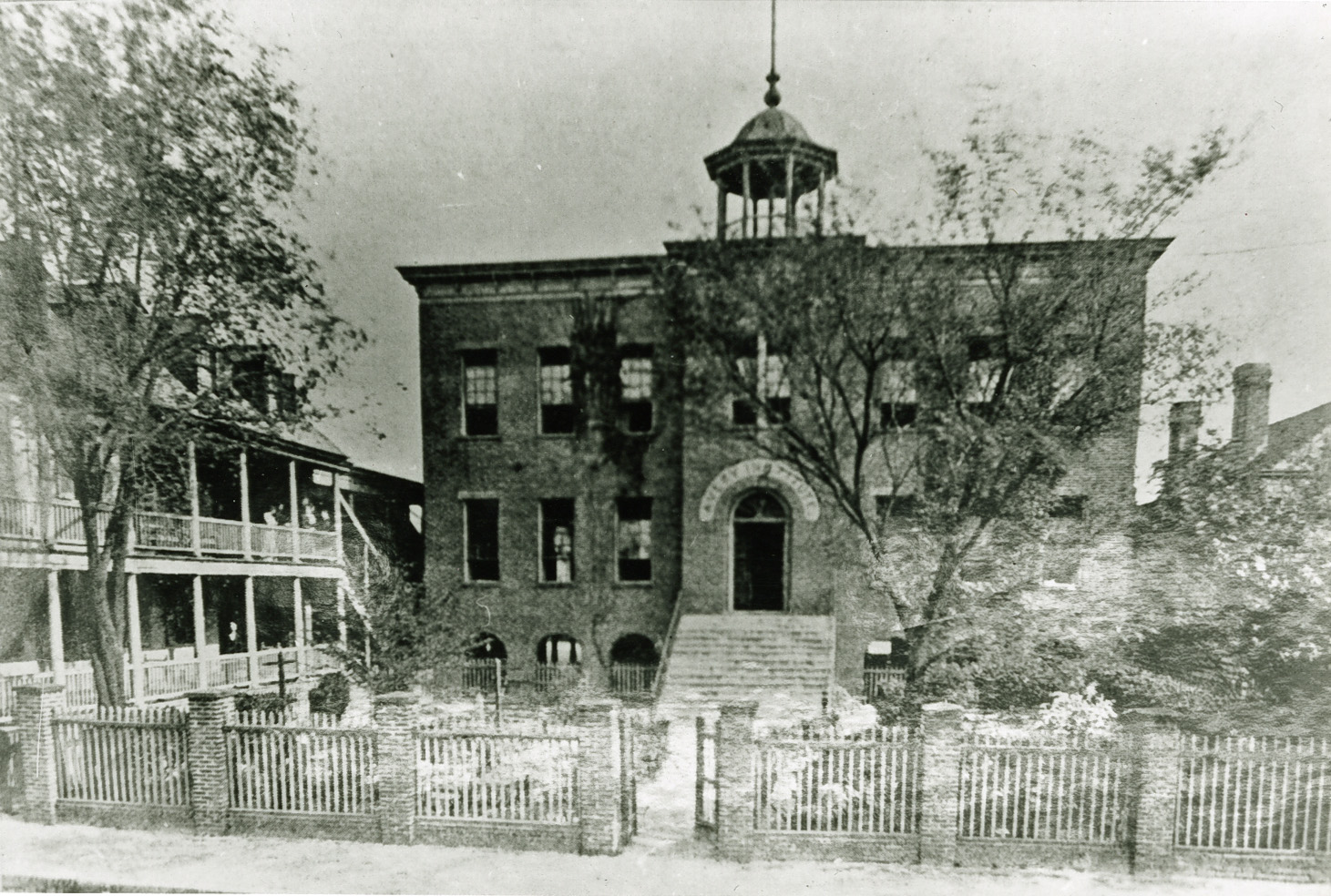
The Avery Normal Institute, ca 1870

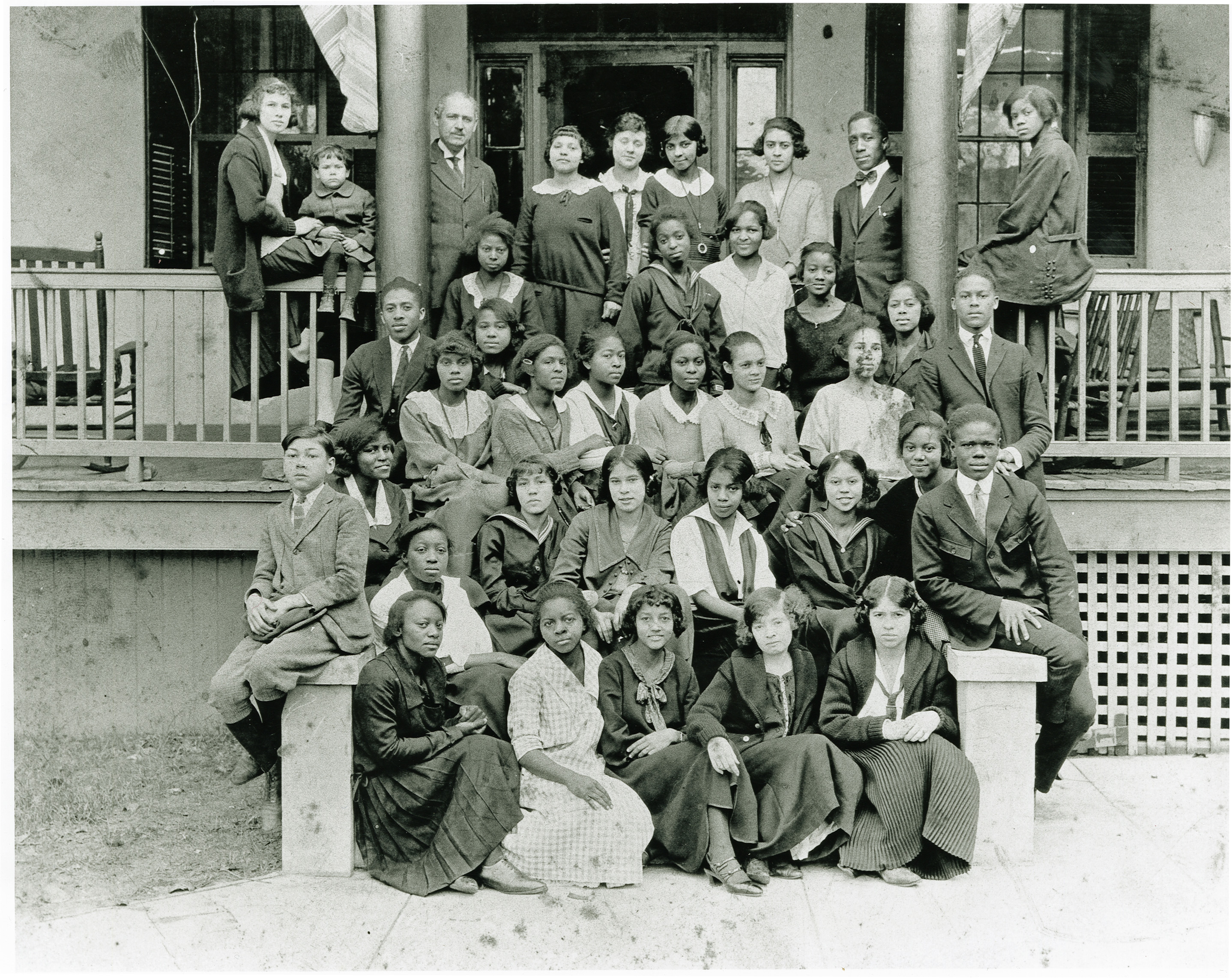
Class photo on the grounds of the Avery Normal Institute, 1924

The Avery Research Center for African American History and Culture is a division of the College of Charleston library system. The center is located on the site of the former Avery Normal Institute in the Harleston village district at 125 Bull Street in Charleston, South Carolina. This historic secondary school trained Black students for professional careers and leadership roles, and served as a hub for Charleston’s African-American community from 1865 to 1954.

In 1978, the alumni of the Avery Normal Institute, led by Lucille Whipper, formed the Avery Institute of Afro-American History and Culture. They worked with the College of Charleston to establish the Avery Research Center in 1985 to preserve the legacy of the Avery Normal Institute and educate the broader community about the history and culture of African Americans in Charleston, the South Carolina Lowcountry, and South Carolina at large.

The Avery Research Center provides access to digital and physical archival collections, offers guided tours, hosts workshops, presents lectures and performances, and features physical and digital museum exhibitions. The Avery Research Center Archives currently hold over six thousand primary- and secondary-source materials that document the history, traditions, legacies, and influences of African Americans.

== History ==
=== Avery Normal Institute, 1865–1954 ===
A school for African American students was founded in Charleston in 1865 by the New York-based American Missionary Association (AMA). The school was initially named the Tappan School in honor of New York abolitionist Lewis Tappan, a founding member of the American Missionary Association. It was soon renamed the Saxton School after Union General Rufus B. Saxton, an assistant commissioner of the Freedmen’s Bureau. The school eventually became the Avery Normal Institute, the first accredited secondary school for African Americans in Charleston, South Carolina. It soon expanded to offer an important teacher education program.

Initially, the school was temporarily located in several buildings appropriated by the federal government in Charleston during Reconstruction. Northern white missionaries and members of Charleston’s antebellum free Black community staffed the school. Thomas W. Cardozo was the school’s first principal. After a controversy emerged from his time as an educator in New York, Francis Cardozo took over as the second principal and served from 1866 to 1868.

Cardozo campaigned to construct a permanent building for the school, and he persuaded the AMA’s traveling secretary, E. P. Smith, to seek $10,000 from the late Reverend Charles Avery’s estate in Pittsburgh, Pennsylvania. With additional aid from the Freedmen’s Bureau, the new school building was dedicated on May 7, 1868, and named the Avery Normal Institute. Cardozo quickly expanded the school’s mission beyond primary and secondary education to include teacher training.

Prior to 1919, a citywide ordinance in Charleston prohibited African Americans from teaching in all but one of the city’s Black public schools. For this reason, many Avery graduates, such as Septima Clark, taught in one-room schoolhouses all over South Carolina, especially in the rural areas of the Lowcountry region surrounding Charleston. Subsequent Avery principals, such as Morrison A. Holmes, continued the school’s tradition of teacher training and classical education, though the instructors were white missionaries rather than local African Americans like the Cardozo brothers.

In 1917, Avery helped establish the city’s branch of the National Association for the Advancement of Colored People (NAACP). The first Charleston NAACP president was noted artist Edwin Harleston (who graduated from Avery in 1900).

Benjamin Cox served as principal from 1915 until 1936 and his wife, Jeanette Keeble Cox, revitalized the school by adding new facilities, new courses to the curriculum, and instituting a variety of cultural improvements such as theatrical plays and musical performances. Cox was the first Black principal at Avery since Cardozo. Subsequent Avery Principals Frank DeCosta (1936–1940) and L. Howard Bennett (1941–1943) moved the school in a more progressive direction. Principal John F. Potts presided over Avery’s transition to a public school in 1947.

With the U.S. Supreme Court’s decision, Brown v. Board of Education, the county school board closed Avery Normal Institute and merged its students and faculty with Burke High School in 1954, citing financial reasons.

The Avery Normal Institute prepared its students for professional careers and leadership roles. Avery students and teachers were often active in the state’s civil rights movement in the 1950s and 60s, even after the school closed. For example, Avery graduates who became prominent civil rights activists included Cecelia Cabaniss Saunders, Septima Clark, J. Andrew Simmons, John Henry McCray, John H. Wrighten, Jr., Arthur J. Clement, Jr., and J. Arthur Brown.

=== Avery Institute for Afro-American History and Culture ===
After 1954, Dr. John Palmer purchased the Avery buildings and operated Palmer Business College on the site for more than two decades, when the school moved to another downtown location. In 1978, a group of Avery graduates (known as “Averyites”) and friends of Avery organized The Avery Institute of Afro-American History and Culture. Their purpose was to obtain the former Avery Normal School buildings and establish an archives and museum dedicated to preserving African-American history and culture in the South Carolina Lowcountry. The Avery Institute’s first president was the Honorable Lucille S. Whipper, a former member of the South Carolina House of Representatives from Charleston County.

To obtain institutional support and fulfill its long-term goals, the organization chose to become affiliated with the College of Charleston. The two groups jointly sought and obtained a federal planning grant in 1981 to organize programs and explore future options. Out of the planning grant came the concept of a research center as a cooperative project of the Avery Institute of Afro-American History and Culture and the College of Charleston. The College of Charleston was subsequently deeded the 123 and 125 Bull Street properties to establish the College of Charleston’s Avery Research Center for African American History and Culture.

=== The Avery Research Center for African American History and Culture, 1985–present ===
In 1985, The Avery Research Center for African American History and Culture was established as part of the academic program of the College of Charleston. Despite delays caused by Hurricane Hugo (September 21, 1989), the grand opening of the building took place on October 6, 1990. Today the Avery Institute is a separate nonprofit organization that provides support to the Avery Research Center’s museum, education, and public history outreach programs and operations, as well as assisting the Avery Research Center in acquiring archival collections.

== Museum and Historic Site ==
The Avery Research Center is a small museum with several galleries that showcase permanent and changing exhibitions. Each year, the Avery Research Center staff develops exhibitions from its archival materials, art, and rare manuscript collections. The Avery Research Center also features temporary art exhibitions by artists from South Carolina and throughout the African diaspora. Guided Tours that are free and open to the public are available from Monday through Friday.

== Archival Collections ==
The Avery Research Center’s Archival Collections hold over six thousand primary and secondary sources, including approximately two hundred manuscript collections, varying in size from a few items to over fifty linear feet. The collections also contain over five thousand printed items, ranging from standard texts, rare books, and pamphlets to dissertations and journals; over four thousand photographs; and hundreds of reels of microfilm, VHS tapes, clipping files, and audio and video recordings in digital formats. There are also dozens of artifact collections encompassing a range of materials relevant to slavery, material culture from West Africa, and even a sweetgrass basket collection.

Processed manuscript collections and other catalogued items can be searched via the College of Charleston’s Addlestone Library‘s online catalogue. The Avery Research Center’s website also features an online finding aid. Selected digitally archived materials are also available online through the Lowcountry Digital Library. Numerous digitized archival materials from Avery are also featured in online exhibitions with the Lowcountry Digital History Initiative.

== Public Programming and Educational Outreach ==
Events and programs at the Avery Research Center range from public lectures, workshops, film screenings, performances, annual conferences, symposia, and exhibition openings, to private group events, meetings, and presentations. Avery Research Center staff may organize and sponsor these events, or they may be arranged by an outside organization at the College of Charleston or elsewhere. Events organized by the Avery Research Center staff typically focus on topics relevant to Avery Research Center’s mission of promoting education and dialogue about African-American history, culture, and contemporary issues in the Lowcountry and/or in the wider African diaspora. Event spaces in the Avery Research Center building include the McKinley Washington Auditorium, as well as various other exhibition galleries and classrooms. Avery Research Center staff members regularly update the Programs calendar with upcoming events. The Avery Research Center staff conducts education programs on and offsite that highlight individuals, social movements, and historical events relevant to the South Carolina Lowcountry African-American history and culture through primary and secondary sources from the Avery Research Center’s archives.
