= Harleston (1813 ship) =

American merchant ship and whaler

History

United States
- Builder: Wiscasset, Maine
- Launched: 1810
- Captured: c.1813

United Kingdom
- Name: Harleston
- Owner: c.1813:Peter Everitt Mestaer; 1820:Ward & Co.; 1821:Various (Note: One account gives her owners as William & Jacob Sims, Sun Tavern Fields, rope makers; James Sims, George Yard, London, merchant; Thomas Wood, Wapping Wall, mast maker.)
- Acquired: c.1813 by purchase of a prize
- Fate: Condemned and broken up in 1826

General characteristics
- Tons burthen: 311, or 314, or 315 (bm)
- Propulsion: Sail
- Armament: 10 × 6-pounder guns

Harleston was an American vessel launched in 1810 at Wiscasset, Maine, and taken in prize. Mestaer purchased her c.1813, and she became a West Indiaman until she was sold on Mestaer's death. She became a whaler and on her way home from her second whaling voyage was condemned in 1826 at Mauritius as unseaworthy and broken up.

== Early British career ==
Harleston first appears in Lloyd's Register in 1813 with Ma__on, master, Mestaer, owner, and trade London transport. More legibly, in 1814 her master is Marion.

In 1820 the executors of the estate of Peter Everitt Mestaer sold Harleston to Thomas Ward (or Wood), London.

Lloyd's Register for 1820 shows her master changing from W. Thornhill to Brightman, and her trade from London—Antigua to London—South Seas. However, it shows her owner changing from Ward & Co. to Mestaers.

== Whaler ==
Harleston sailed on her first whaling voyage in 1821 under the command of Isaac Brightman, and bound for Timor. She returned on 9 November 1822 with 420 casks, (seal?) skins, feathers, ivory, and 45 elephant teeth.

Harleston sailed on her second whaling voyage on 10 May 1823 under the command of Captain Gulliver, bound for Timor and the Japans. She was reported to have been at Timor on 16 December with 200 barrels. in June-July 1824 she was off the coast of Japan with 500 barrels. In September she was again at Timor, but now with 700 barrels. In January 1825 she had 900 barrels.

Lloyd's Register for 1825 shows Harleston's master as T. Gulliver, and her owner as Ward.

== Fate ==
On 26 March 1826 Harleston put into Mauritius in an unseaworthy state while returning to London from Timor. The surveyors at Mauritius condemned her and she was then sold for breaking up. Her cargo of 200 tons of oil was transferred to Minerva, Norris, master, for shipment to London.
