= List of power stations in Idaho =

Sources of Idaho utility-scale electricity generation in gigawatt-hours, full-year 2025:
1. Hydroelectric: 9,718 (46.8%)
2. Natural gas: 5,706 (27.5%)
3. Wind: 3,100 (14.9%)
4. Solar: 1,621 (7.81%)
5. Biomass: 509 (2.45%)
6. Geothermal: 82 (0.39%)
7. Other: 27 (0.13%)

This is a list of electricity-generating power stations in Idaho, sorted by type and name. In 2024, Idaho had a total summer capacity of 5.5 GW through all of its power plants, and a net generation of 20,035 GWh. The electrical energy generation mix in 2025 was 46.8% hydroelectric, 27.5% natural gas, 14.9% wind, 7.8% solar, 2.5% biomass, 0.4% geothermal, and less than 0.2% other.

During 2021, Idaho was one of the top five U.S. states with its share of renewable electricity generation. It has a rapidly growing population and many undeveloped resources. Idahoans have consumed about 50% more electricity during recent years than is generated within the state.

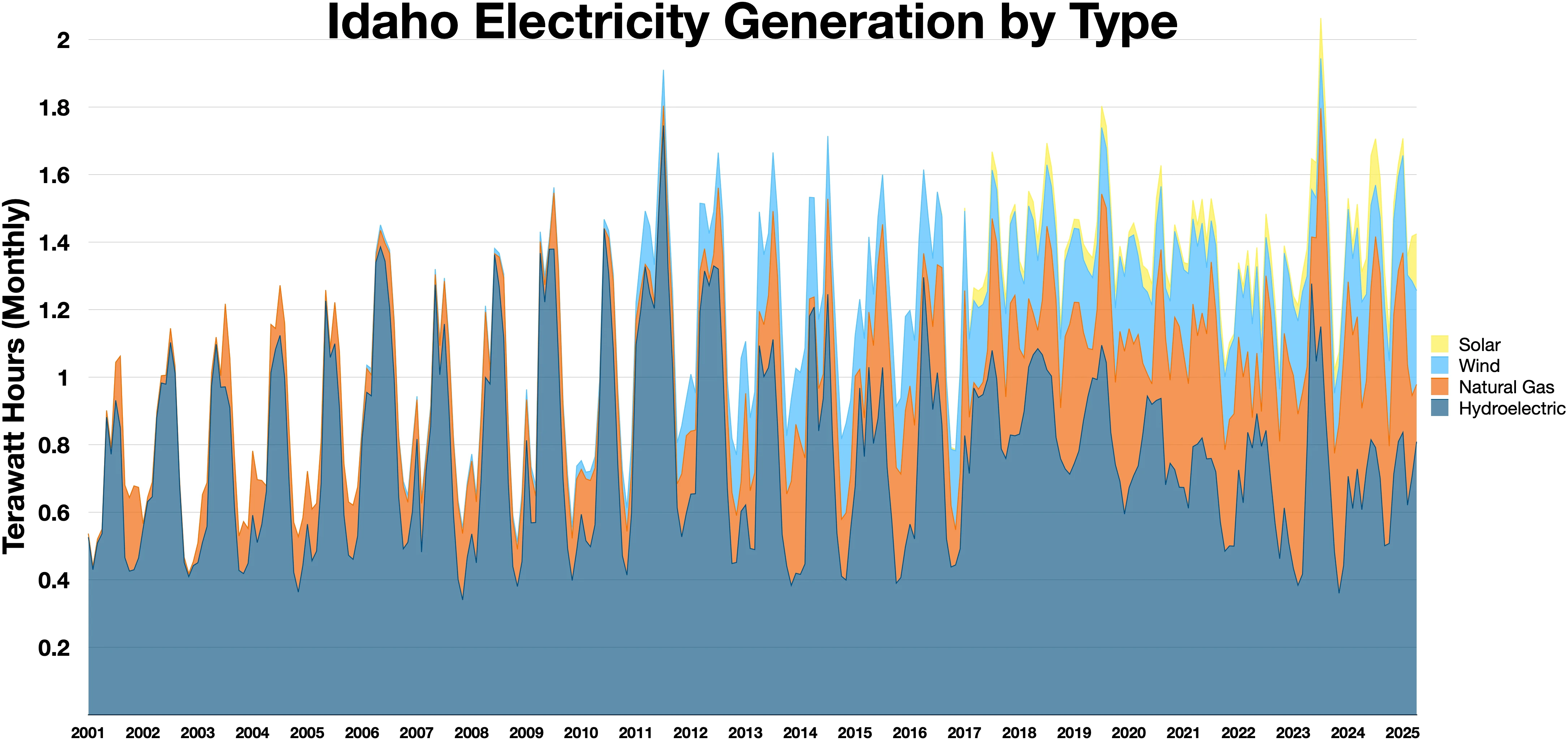
Idaho electricity generation by type

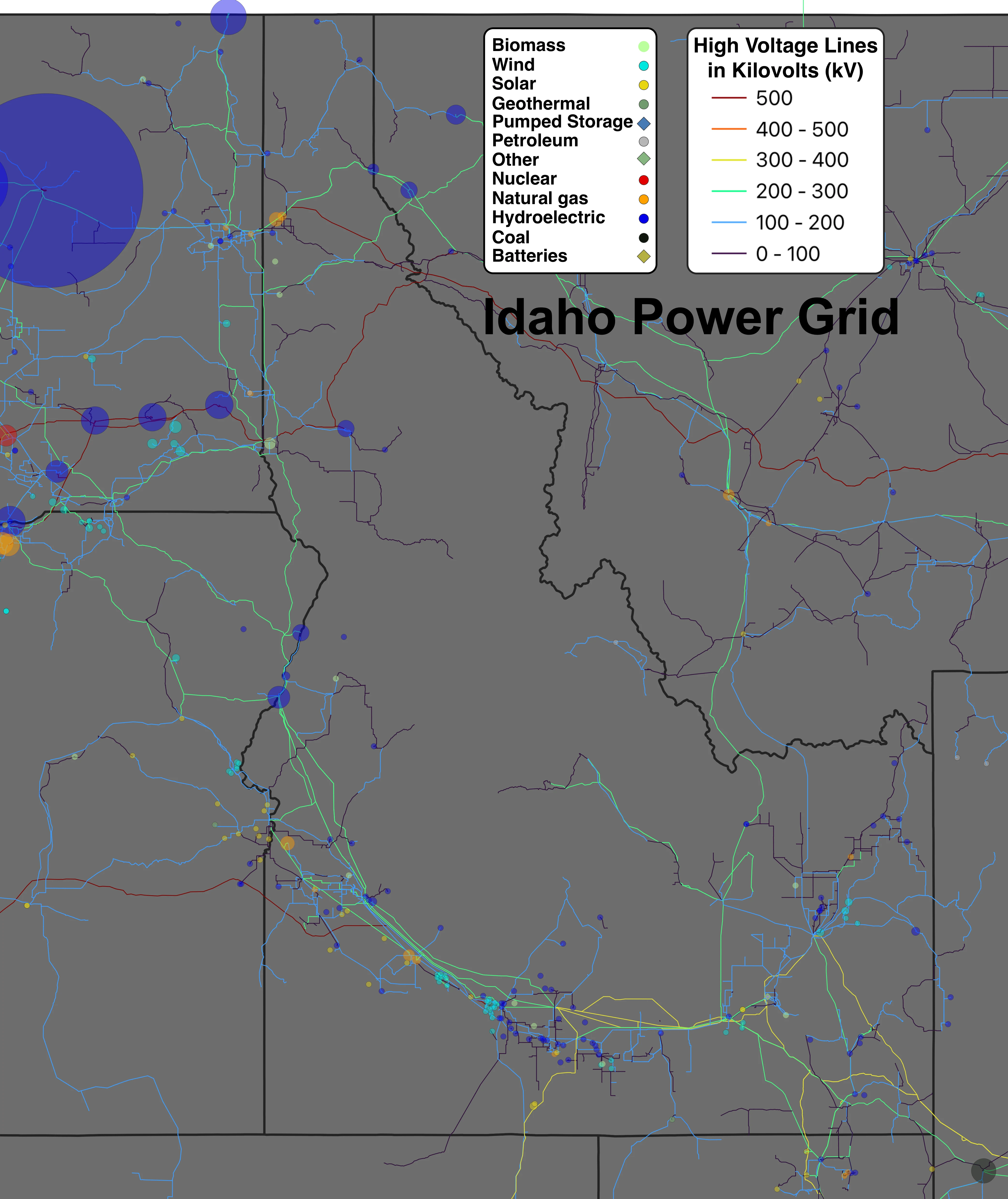
Idaho power grid

== Fossil-fuel power stations ==
Data from the U.S. Energy Information Administration serves as a general reference.

=== Coal-fired ===
Name	Location	Coordinates	Capacity (MW)	Year opened	Refs
Amalgamated Sugar Twin Falls Power Plant	Twin Falls County	42.5328°N 114.4328°W	8.5	1948/1994	

=== Natural gas-fired ===
Idaho has few natural gas reserves, and most of the supply is imported. There were just eight producing wells in the state in 2019.

Name	Location	Coordinates	Capacity (MW)	Generation type	Year opened	Refs
Amalgamated Sugar Nampa Power Plant^{[A]}	Canyon County	43.6058°N 116.5753°W	8.2	Steam turbine	2015	
Bennet Mountain Gas Turbine	Elmore County	43.1471°N 115.6666°W	164	Simple cycle	2005	
Evander Andrews Power Complex (or Danskin Power Plant)	Elmore County	43.1791°N 115.7343°W	260	Simple cycle (x3)	2002/2008	
Langley Gulch Power Plant	Payette County	43.9044°N 116.8197°W	300	1x1 combined cycle	2012	
Rathdrum Gas Turbine	Kootenai County	47.8043°N 116.8673°W	132	Simple cycle (x2)	1994	
Rathdrum Power Plant (or Lancaster Plant)	Kootenai County	47.7858°N 116.9203°W	270	1x1 combined cycle	2001	

^{A} The Nampa plant was opened 1948 and originally coal-fired before it was converted to gas in 2015.

=== Petroleum-fired ===
Name	Location	Coordinates	Capacity (MW)	Generation type	Year opened	Refs
Salmon Diesel	Lemhi County	45.1834°N 113.8853°W	5.4	Reciprocating engine (x2)	1967	

== Renewable power stations ==
Data from the U.S. Energy Information Administration serves as a general reference.

=== Biomass and industrial waste ===
Name	Location	Coordinates	Capacity (MW)	Primary fuel	Generation type	Year opened	Refs
Bannock County Landfill Gas	Bannock County	42.7878°N 112.3656°W	3.2	Landfill gas	Reciprocating engine (x2)	2014/2019	
Cargill Dry Creek Biofactory	Twin Falls County	42.4249°N 114.2292°W	2.4	Biogas	Reciprocating engine (x3)	2008	
Clearwater Paper Biomass	Nez Perce County	46.4231°N 116.9764°W	54.5	Wood/wood waste	Steam turbine (x4)	1950/1977/ 1981/1991	
Fighting Creek Landfill Gas	Kootenai County	47.5317°N 116.9300°W	3.2	Landfill gas	Reciprocating engine (x2)	2012	
Hidden Hollow Energy	Ada County	43.6972°N 116.2714°W	3.2	Landfill gas	Reciprocating engine (x2)	2007	
Milner Butte LFGE	Cassia County	42.4669°N 114.0046°W	2.6	Landfill gas	Reciprocating engine (x2)	2018	
Plummer Cogen	Benewah County	47.3310°N 116.8904°W	5.8	Wood/wood waste	Steam turbine	1982	
Rock Creek Dairy	Twin Falls County	42.50027°N 114.6150°W	3.2	Biogas	Reciprocating engine (x2)	2012	
Simplot Don Plant	Bannock County	42.9084°N 112.52944°W	15.0	Industrial waste heat^{[A]}	Steam turbine	1986	
Tamarack Energy	Adams County	44.9548°N 116.3871°W	5.8	Wood/wood waste	Steam turbine	1983	

^{A} Waste heat from phosphate fertilizer manufacturing

=== Geothermal ===
Name	Location	Coordinates	Capacity (MW)	Generation type	Year opened	Refs
Raft River Plant	Casia County	42.0994°N 113.3824°W	10.0	Binary cycle	2008	

=== Hydroelectric ===
Name	Location	Coordinates	Capacity (MW)	Number of turbines	Year opened	Refs
Albeni Falls Powerplant	Bonner County	48.1802°N 116.9985°W	42.0	3	1955	
American Falls Hydro	Power County	42.7778°N 112.8764°W	110.4	3	1978	
Anderson Ranch; Powerplant	Elmore County	43.3571°N 115.4515°W	40.0	2	1951/2010	
Arrowrock Dam; Powerplant	Boise County; Elmore County	43.5950°N 115.9233°W	15.0	2	2010	
Ashton Hydro	Fremont County	44.0786°N 111.4973°W	7.1	3	1917/1925	
Barber Dam Powerplant	Ada County	43.5610°N 116.1212°W	4.0	1	1990	
Black Canyon Diversion Powerplant	Gem County	43.9305°N 116.4372°W	10.2	2	1925	
Bliss Hydro	Elmore County; Gooding County	42.9138°N 115.0710°W	75.0	3	1949/1950	
Boise River Diversion; Powerplant	Ada County	43.5377°N 116.0938°W	3.3	3	2004	
Brownlee Hydro	Washington County	44.8367°N 116.8975°W	675.0	5	1958/1980	
Bulb Turbine Project	Bonneville County	43.4913°N 112.0454°W	27.0	4	1940/1982	
C. J. Strike Hydro	Owyhee County	42.9449°N 115.9778°W	82.8	3	1952	
Cabinet Gorge Hydro	Bonner County	48.0844°N 116.0530°W	265.2	4	1952/1953	
Cascade Hydro	Valley County	44.5256°N 116.0483°W	14.4	2	1983/1984	
Chester Diversion Hydro	Fremont County	44.0183°N 111.5836°W	3.6	3	2014	
Clear Lake Hydro	Gooding County; Twin Falls County	42.6670°N 114.7801°W	2.5	1	1937	
Dietrich Drop	Lincoln County	42.8360°N 114.2680°W	4.8	1	1990	
Dworshak Hydropower; Plant	Clearwater County	46.5143°N 116.2977°W	465.0	3	1975	
Falls River Hydro	Fremont County	44.0597°N 111.3535°W	9.0	2	1993	
Felt Hydro	Teton County	43.9135°N 111.2833°W	5.9	4	1946/1947/ 1986	
Gem State Hydro	Bonneville County	43.4202°N 112.1019°W	23.4	1	1988	
Grace Hydro	Caribou County	42.5368°N 111.7940°W	33.0	3	1923	
Hells Canyon Hydro	Adams County	45.2439°N 116.7008°W	391.5^{[A]}	3	1967	
Horseshoe Bend Hydro	Boise County	43.9041°N 116.2442°W	9.4	2	1955	
Island Park Hydro	Fremont County	44.4183°N 111.3960°W	4.8	2	1994	
Lower Salmon Falls Hydro	Gooding County	42.8416°N 114.9036°W	60.0	4	1949	
Lucky Peak Hydro	Ada County	43.5280°N 116.0583°W	101.2	3	1988	
Magic Dam Hydro	Blaine County	43.2547°N 114.3569°W	9.0	3	1989	
Malad Hydro (Upper & Lower)	Gooding County	42.8643°N 114.8855°W	22.0	2	1948	
Milner Hydro	Cassia County	42.5267°N 114.0369°W	60.0	3	1992	
Minidoka Powerplant	Minidoka County	42.6699°N 113.4832°W	27.7	4	1927/1942/ 1997	
Moyie Springs Hydro	Boundary County	48.7339°N 116.1752°W	4.0	4	1921/1941/ 1950/1982	
Oneida Hydro	Caribou County	42.2678°N 111.7485°W	30.0	3	1915/1916/ 1920	
Oxbow Hydro	Adams County	44.9716°N 116.8350°W	190.0^{[A]}	4	1961	
Palisades Powerplant	Bonneville County	43.3348°N 111.2058°W	176.4	4	1957/1958	
Post Falls Hydro	Kootenai County	47.7033°N 116.9538°W	15.0	6	1906/1980	
Shoshone Falls Hydro	Jerome County	42.5975°N 114.4033°W	13.0	1	1921	
Smith Creek Hydro	Boundary County	48.9595°N 116.5574°W	38.1	3	1989/1990	
Soda Hydro	Caribou County	42.6445°N 111.6967°W	15.0	2	1924	
Swan Falls Hydro	Ada County	43.2435°N 116.3791°W	25.0	2	1994	
Thousand Springs Hydro	Gooding County	42.7405°N 114.8367°W	6.8	1	1920	
Twin Falls Hydro	Twin Falls County	42.5892°N 114.3553°W	53.0	2	1935/1995	
Upper Salmon Falls Hydro	Gooding County	42.7664°N 114.9082°W	35.0	4	1937/1947	

^{A} Electricity is generated in Oregon.

=== Wind ===
Name	Location	Coordinates	Capacity (MW)	Number of turbines	Year opened	Turbine mfg spec	Refs
Burley Butte Wind Park	Cassia County	42.4903°N 113.9266°W	19.5	13	2011	GE 1.5MW	
Camp Reed Wind Farm	Elmore County	42.8119°N 115.0488°W	22.5	15	2010	GE 1.5MW	
Goshen Wind Farm	Bonneville County	43.4670°N 111.8363°W	125	83	2010	GE 1.5MW	
High Mesa Wind Farm	Elmore County; Twin Falls County	42.8800°N 115.0366°W	39.9	19	2012	Suzlon 2.1MW	
Horse Butte Wind Farm	Bonneville County	43.3864°N 111.7264°W	57.6	32	2012	Vestas 1.8MW	
Meadow Creek Wind Farm	Bonneville County	43.5244°N 111.8039°W	120	57	2012	Suzlon 2.1MW	
Milner Dam Wind Farm	Cassia County	42.4606°N 114.0172°W	19.5	13	2011	GE 1.5MW	
Payne's Ferry Wind Farm	Twin Falls County	42.8253°N 115.0108°W	21.0	14	2010	GE 1.5MW	
Power County Wind Park	Power County	42.7389°N 112.7486°W	45.0	18	2011	Nordex 2.5MW	
Rockland Wind Farm	Power County	42.6747°N 112.90194°W	79.2	44	2011	Vestas 1.8MW	
Wolverine Creek Wind	Bonneville County	43.4195°N 111.8294°W	64.5	43	2009	GE 1.5MW	
Yahoo Creek Wind Farm	Twin Falls County	42.7708°N 114.9886°W	21.0	14	2010	GE 1.5MW	

=== Solar ===
Name	Location	Coordinates	Capacity (MW_{AC})	Year opened	Refs
American Falls Solar Farm	Power County	42.8240°N 112.7520°W	20	2017	
Grandview Solar Farm	Elmore County	42.9896°N 116.0934°W	80	2016	
ID Solar Farm	Ada County	43.4440°N 116.3330°W	40	2016	
Mountain Home Solar Farm	Elmore County	43.1290°N 115.7520°W	20	2017	
Murphy Flat Solar Farm	Ada County	43.2130°N 116.4390°W	20	2017	
Orchard Ranch Solar Farm	Ada County	43.4670°N 116.2850°W	20	2017	
Simcoe Solar Farm	Elmore County	43.2884°N 115.9554°W	20	2017	

== Storage power stations ==
Idaho had no utility-scale storage facilities in 2019.

== Nuclear (R&D only) ==
Since 1951, 52 reactors have been built on the grounds of the Atomic Energy Commission's National Reactor Testing Station, currently the location of the U.S. Department of Energy's Idaho National Laboratory (INL). BORAX-III was the first nuclear reactor to supply electrical power to the U.S. grid, in 1955. Four reactors which do not generate electricity were in operation at the site as of 2020.

Name	Location	Coordinates	Capacity (MW)	Refs	Year opened	Year closed	Note
Advanced Test Reactor (ATR)	Butte County	43.5858°N 112.9653°W	N/A		1967		
Advanced Test Reactor Critical Facility (ATRC)	Butte County		N/A		1964		
Argonne Low Power Reactor (ALPR/SL-1)	Butte County	43.5180°N 112.8234°W	0.3		1958	1961	meltdown
Experimental Breeder Reactor I (EBR-I)	Butte County	43.5113°N 113.0064°W	0.2		1951	1964	
Experimental Breeder Reactor II (EBR-II)	Butte County		20		1964	1994	
Neutron Radiography Reactor (NRAD)	Butte County		N/A		1977		
Transient Reactor Test Facility (TREAT)	Butte County		N/A		1959	1994	restarted 2017
Versatile Test Reactor (VTR)	Butte County		TBD				proposed

== See also ==
- List of power stations in the United States
