= List of waterfalls in Idaho =

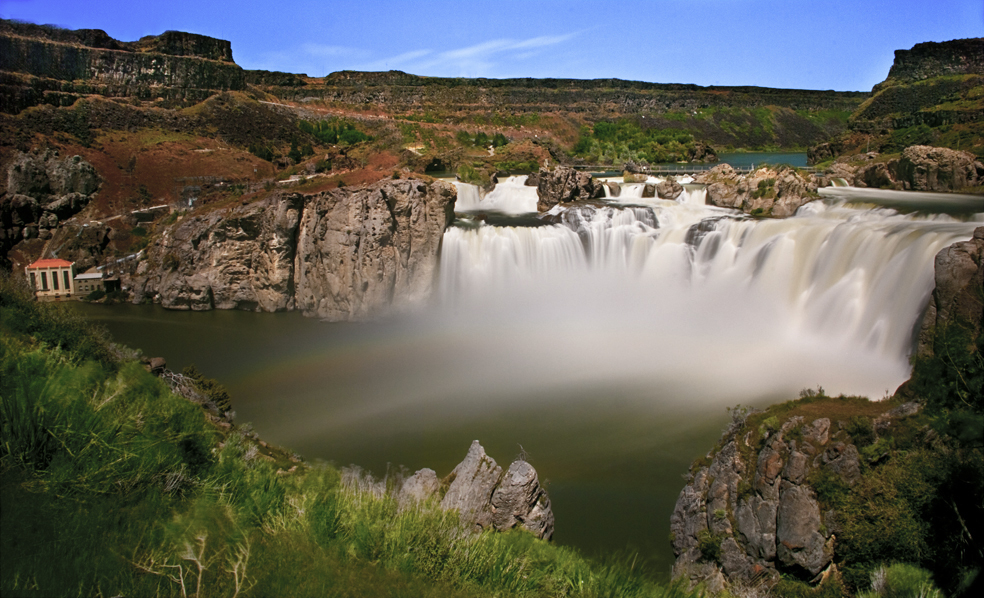
Shoshone Falls

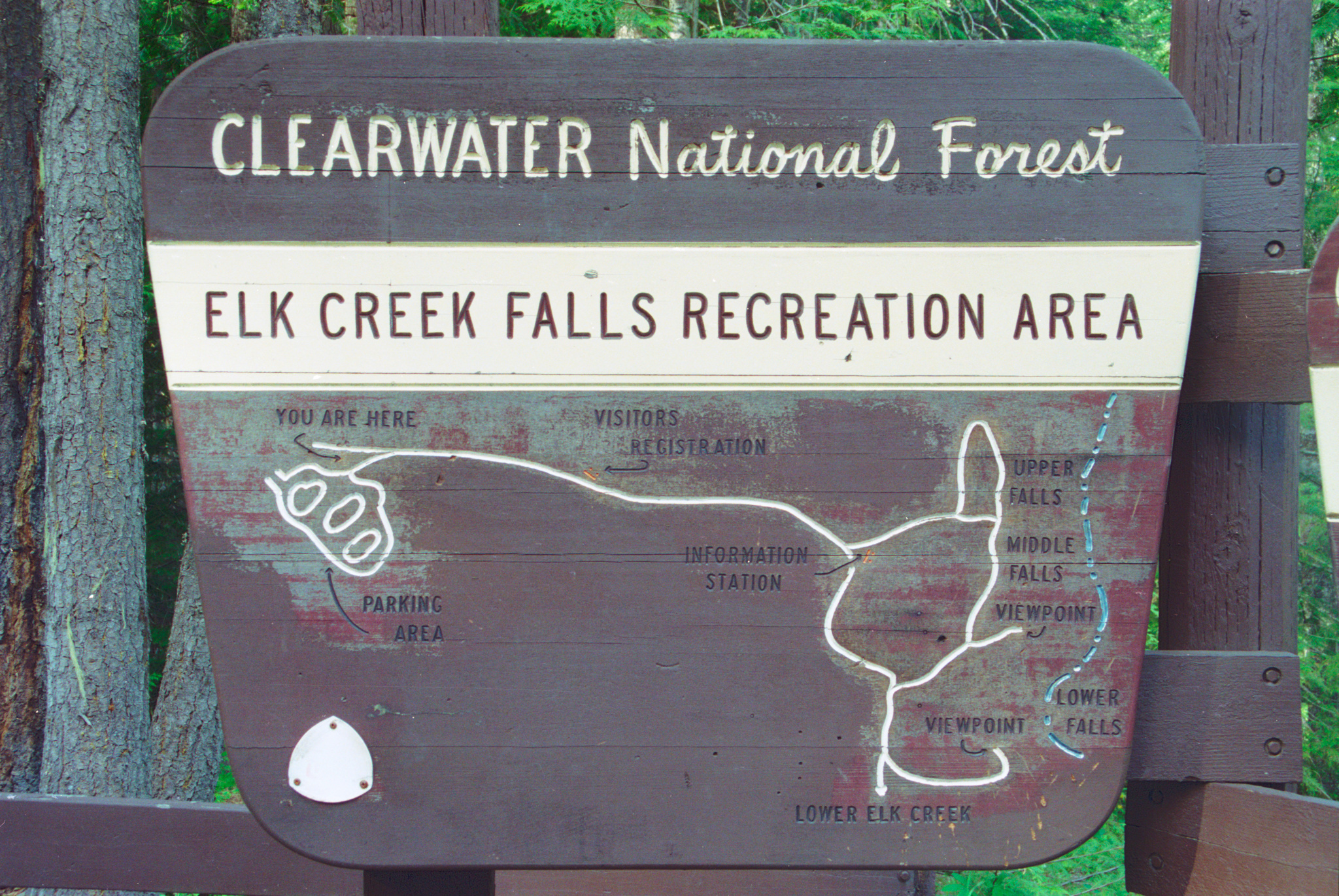
Elk Creek Falls, Clearwater County

There are at least 63 named waterfalls in Idaho as listed in the Geographic Names Information System by the U.S. Geological Survey.

- Albeni Falls, Bonner County, Idaho, 48°10′5″N 117°00′05″W, el. 2,064 feet (629 m)
- Auger Falls, Twin Falls County, Idaho, 42°37′5″N 114°31′38″W, el. 3,025 feet (922 m)
- Baron Creek Falls, Boise County, Idaho, 44°06′5″N 115°02′06″W, el. 7,595 feet (2,315 m)
- Bear Creek Falls, Adams County, Idaho, 44°58′5″N 116°42′07″W, el. 4,055 feet (1,236 m)
- Big Drops, Lincoln County, Idaho, 42°57′5″N 114°23′38″W, el. 3,983 feet (1,214 m)
- Big Falls, Boise County, Idaho, 44°03′5″N 115°43′23″W, el. 3,497 feet (1,066 m)
- Bridal Veil Falls, Custer County, Idaho, 44°12′5″N 115°06′24″W, el. 7,254 feet (2,211 m)
- Bull Run Creek Falls, Clearwater County, Idaho, 46°44′5″N 116°11′45″W, el. 2,477 feet (755 m)
- Camel Falls, Owyhee County, Idaho, 42°32′5″N 116°37′23″W, el. 5,449 feet (1,661 m)
- Caribou Falls, Boundary County, Idaho, 48°49′5″N 116°46′45″W, el. 3,442 feet (1,049 m)
- Char Falls, Bonner County, Idaho, 48°21′5″N 116°10′15″W, el. 4,134 feet (1,260 m)
- Copper Falls, Boundary County, Idaho, 48°58′5″N 116°08′32″W, el. 3,415 feet (1,041 m)
- Crane Falls (historical), Elmore County, Idaho, 42°58′5″N 115°49′50″W, el. 2,457 feet (749 m)
- Dagger Falls, Valley County, Idaho, 44°31′5″N 115°17′09″W, el. 5,679 feet (1,731 m)
- Deadman Falls, Elmore County, Idaho, 42°53′5″N 115°21′06″W, el. 2,907 feet (886 m)
- Devils Washboard Falls, Gooding County, Idaho, 42°40′5″N 114°46′43″W, el. 2,959 feet (902 m)
- Devlin Falls, Lemhi County, Idaho, 45°13′5″N 114°05′52″W, el. 6,788 feet (2,069 m)
- Elk Creek Falls, Clearwater County, Idaho, 46°44′5″N 116°10′27″W, el. 2,562 feet (781 m)
- Fall Creek Falls, Bonneville County, Idaho, 43°26′5″N 111°22′38″W, el. 5,266 feet (1,605 m)
- Fern Falls, Boise County, Idaho, 44°02′5″N 115°05′22″W, el. 6,401 feet (1,951 m)
- Fern Falls, Shoshone County, Idaho, 47°45′5″N 116°06′18″W, el. 3,228 feet (984 m)
- Goat Falls, Custer County, Idaho, 44°10′5″N 115°01′04″W, el. 8,104 feet (2,470 m)
- Grouse Creek Falls, Bonner County, Idaho, 48°27′5″N 116°20′20″W, el. 2,687 feet (819 m)
- Hazard Falls, Idaho County, Idaho, 45°12′5″N 116°15′23″W, el. 4,787 feet (1,459 m)
- Jump Creek Falls, Owyhee County, Idaho, 43°28′5″N 116°55′32″W, el. 2,687 feet (819 m)
- Lady Face Falls, Custer County, Idaho, 44°13′5″N 115°05′45″W, el. 6,637 feet (2,023 m)
- Little Drops, Lincoln County, Idaho, 42°58′5″N 114°25′16″W, el. 3,973 feet (1,211 m)
- Little Falls, Boise County, Idaho, 44°04′5″N 115°45′45″W, el. 3,409 feet (1,039 m)
- Lost Creek Falls, Adams County, Idaho, 44°55′5″N 116°27′11″W, el. 4,393 feet (1,339 m)
- Lower Mesa Falls, Fremont County, Idaho, 44°10′5″N 111°19′11″W, el. 5,518 feet (1,682 m)
- Lower Salmon Falls, Gooding County, Idaho, 42°50′5″N 114°54′15″W, el. 2,657 feet (810 m)
- Mallard Creek Falls, Idaho County, Idaho, 45°33′5″N 115°17′53″W, el. 4,757 feet (1,450 m)
- McAbee Falls, Bonner County, Idaho, 48°17′5″N 116°52′19″W, el. 2,192 feet (668 m)
- Mission Falls, Bonner County, Idaho, 48°25′5″N 116°55′44″W, el. 2,323 feet (708 m)
- Moyie Falls, Boundary County, Idaho, 48°43′5″N 116°10′32″W, el. 1,936 feet (590 m)
- Napias Creek Falls, Lemhi County, Idaho, 45°08′5″N 114°12′04″W, el. 5,059 feet (1,542 m)
- Patsy Ann Falls, Idaho County, Idaho, 45°57′5″N 114°27′29″W, el. 5,400 feet (1,600 m)
- Perrine Coulee Falls, Twin Falls County, Idaho, 42°35′5″N 114°28′21″W, el. 3,573 feet (1,089 m)
- Phantom Falls, Cassia County, Idaho, 42°05′5″N 114°07′54″W, el. 6,375 feet (1,943 m)
- Pillar Falls, Twin Falls County, Idaho, 42°35′5″N 114°25′52″W, el. 3,140 feet (960 m)
- Rambiker Falls, Shoshone County, Idaho, 47°01′5″N 115°05′17″W, el. 6,250 feet (1,900 m)
- Ross Falls, Twin Falls County, Idaho, 42°12′5″N 114°17′23″W, el. 6,407 feet (1,953 m)
- Rush Falls, Washington County, Idaho, 44°43′5″N 116°41′24″W, el. 6,073 feet (1,851 m)
- Salmon Falls, Idaho County, Idaho, 45°29′5″N 114°59′56″W, el. 2,677 feet (816 m)
- Salmon Falls, Twin Falls County, Idaho, 42°46′5″N 114°53′50″W, el. 2,871 feet (875 m)
- Selway Falls, Idaho County, Idaho, 46°03′5″N 115°18′26″W, el. 1,706 feet (520 m)
- Shadow Falls, Shoshone County, Idaho, 47°45′5″N 116°06′25″W, el. 3,350 feet (1,020 m)
- Sheep Falls, Fremont County, Idaho, 44°04′5″N 111°05′31″W, el. 5,909 feet (1,801 m)
- Sheep Falls, Fremont County, Idaho, 44°12′5″N 111°23′38″W, el. 5,820 feet (1,770 m)
- Shoestring Falls, Idaho County, Idaho, 46°16′5″N 115°23′25″W, el. 1,913 feet (583 m)
- Shoshone Falls, Twin Falls County, Idaho, 42°35′5″N 114°24′03″W, el. 3,255 feet (992 m)
- Smith Falls, Boise County, Idaho, 44°00′5″N 115°02′26″W, el. 7,060 feet (2,150 m)
- Smith Falls, Boundary County, Idaho, 48°57′5″N 116°33′29″W, el. 1,909 feet (582 m)
- Snow Creek Falls, Boundary County, Idaho, 48°40′5″N 116°25′46″W, el. 2,293 feet (699 m)
- The Falls, Caribou County, Idaho, 42°45′5″N 111°06′46″W, el. 7,047 feet (2,148 m)
- The Falls, Owyhee County, Idaho, 42°31′5″N 116°11′17″W, el. 5,463 feet (1,665 m)
- Torrelle Falls, Bonner County, Idaho, 48°17′5″N 116°57′31″W, el. 2,287 feet (697 m)
- Twin Falls, Jerome County, Idaho, 42°35′5″N 114°21′14″W, el. 3,517 feet (1,072 m)
- Upper Mesa Falls, Fremont County, Idaho, 44°11′5″N 111°19′48″W, el. 5,613 feet (1,711 m)
- Upper Priest Falls, Boundary County, Idaho, 48°59′5″N 116°56′27″W, el. 3,432 feet (1,046 m)
- Upper Salmon Falls, Twin Falls County, Idaho, 42°46′5″N 114°53′50″W, el. 2,871 feet (875 m)
- Wildhorse Falls, Adams County, Idaho, 44°50′5″N 116°49′04″W, el. 2,795 feet (852 m)

== See also ==
- List of waterfalls
- List of Idaho rivers
- List of longest streams of Idaho
- Lost streams of Idaho
- Snake River Plain (ecoregion)
- Snake River Plain
- List of lakes of Idaho
