= Salmon Falls =

Salmon Falls may refer to:

- Salmon Falls (Snake River), the series of falls comprising the Upper Salmon Falls and Lower Salmon Falls on the Snake River, near Hagerman, Idaho.
- Salmon Falls River, in Maine and New Hampshire.
- Salmon Falls Village, now Rollinsford, New Hampshire, Somersworth, New Hampshire and Berwick, Maine
- Salmon Falls, California, a former settlement in that state.
- Salmon River Falls, a waterfall on New York's Salmon River.
