= Danskin =

Danskin may refer to:

- Bob Danskin (1908–1985), English footballer
- Charlie Danskin (1893–1968), English footballer
- David Danskin (1863–1948), Scottish mechanical engineer and footballer
- Danskin's theorem, a mathematical theorem in convex analysis
- Danskin, a women's clothing brand owned by Iconix Brand Group
- Danskin Triathlon, a women's only triathlon
- Danskin Power Plant, a gas-fired power plant owned and operated by Idaho Power near Mountain Home, Idaho, USA.
