= Idacorp =

Electricity generating company

IDACORP, Inc
- Company type: Public
- Traded as: NYSE: IDA; S&P 400 Component
- Industry: Electric Power; Hydroelectricity; Coal-fired; Natural Gas
- Founded: October 1, 1998; 28 years ago
- Headquarters: Boise, Idaho, United States
- Area served: Idaho, eastern Oregon
- Key people: Lisa Grow, president and chief executive officer, IDACORP, Inc. and Idaho Power
- Revenue: $1.35 billion (2020)
- Operating income: ▼US$ 352.1 million (2020)
- Net income: $237 million (2020)
- Number of employees: 1,943 (2020)
- Website: www.idacorpinc.com

IDACORP, Inc is an electricity holding company, incorporated in Idaho with headquarters in Boise. It comprises Idaho Power Company, IDACORP Financial and Ida-West Energy. It was formed on October 1, 1998.

== Energy mix ==
In 2020, hydroelectric power represented 41.7% of power generated, though it still uses coal-fired and natural gas generators.

Type	%
Hydroelectric	41.7%
Coal-fired	20.9%
Natural gas	11.9%
Wind	11.1%
Solar	4.1%
Geothermal	2.9%

^ Market purchases make up the remaining 7.4%

== See also ==
- Idaho Power
- List of power stations in Idaho
- Hydroelectric power plants in Idaho
