= Lower Mesa Falls =

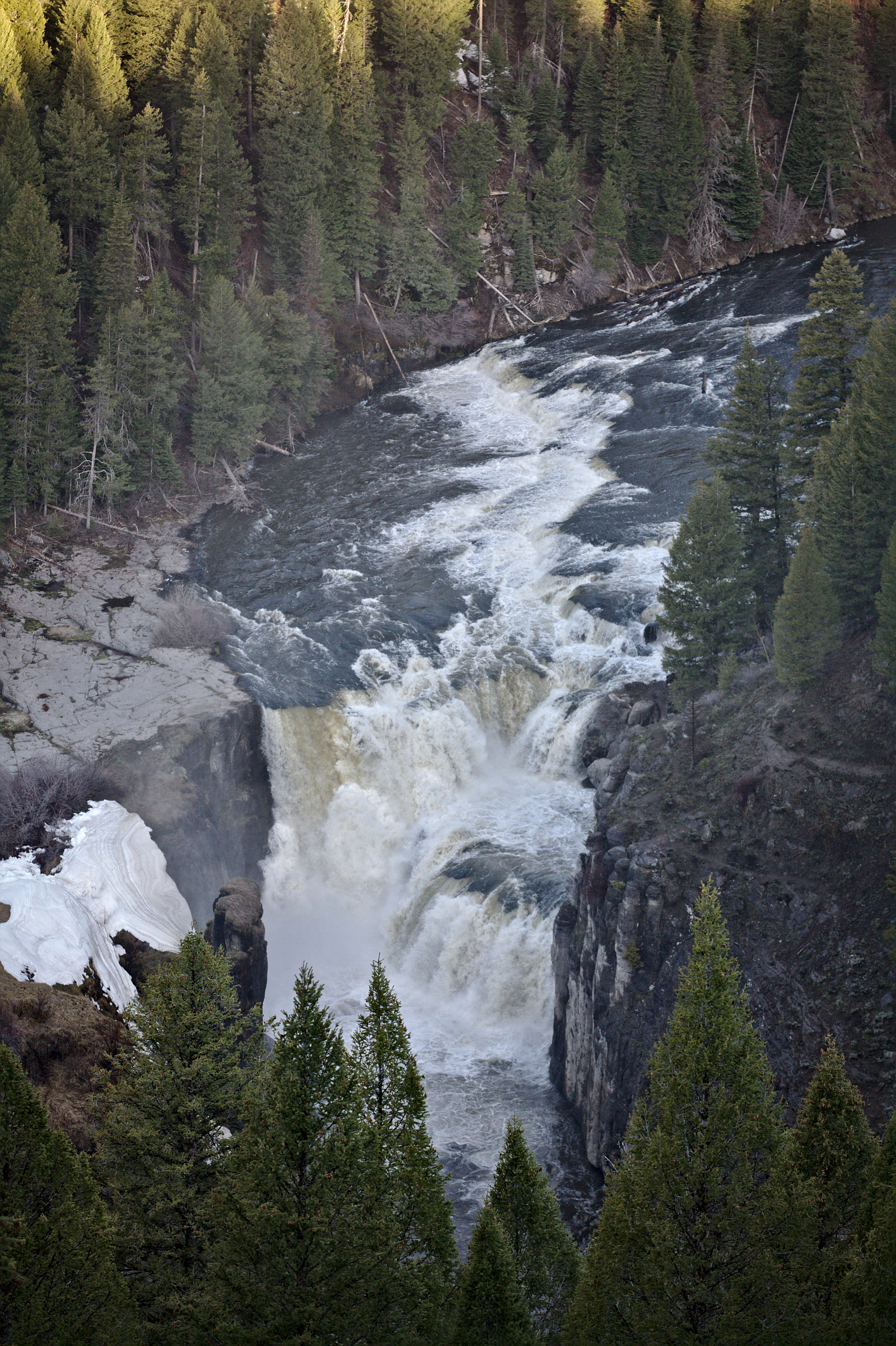
- Interactive map of Lower Mesa Falls
- Location: Fremont County, Idaho
- Coordinates: 44°10′5″N 111°19′11″W
- Elevation: 5,518 feet (1,682 m)
- Total height: 65 feet (20 m)
- Watercourse: Henrys Fork

Lower Mesa Falls is a 65-foot (20 m) waterfall on the Henrys Fork in Fremont County, Idaho. It is located in the Caribou-Targhee National Forest on the Mesa Falls Scenic Byway. It is downstream of Upper Mesa Falls.

== See also ==
- List of waterfalls
- List of waterfalls in Idaho
