= Upper Mesa Falls =

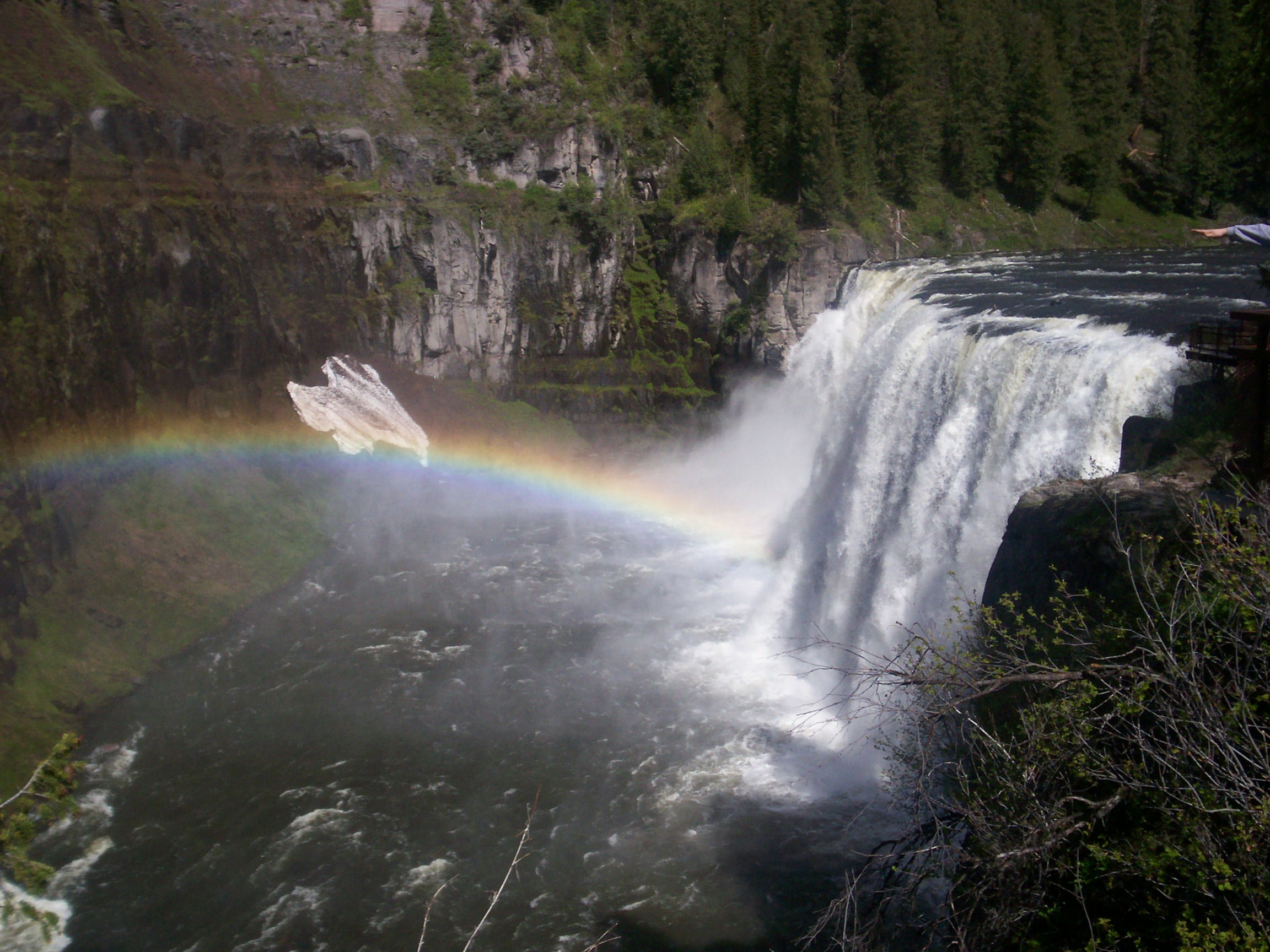
- Upper Mesa Falls in June 2008
- Interactive map of Upper Mesa Falls
- Location: Fremont County, Idaho
- Coordinates: 44°11′16″N 111°19′48″W
- Type: Block
- Elevation: 5,600 feet (1,707 m)
- Total height: 114 feet (35 m)
- Watercourse: Henrys Fork (Snake River)

Upper Mesa Falls is a waterfall on the Henrys Fork in the Caribou-Targhee National Forest. Upstream from Lower Mesa Falls, it is roughly 16 miles (26 km) away from Ashton, Idaho.

Upper Mesa Falls is roughly 114 feet (35 m) high and 200 feet (61 m) wide.

== Formation ==
Mesa Falls Tuff, which is the rock over which Upper Mesa Falls cascades, was formed 1.3 million years ago. A cycle of rhyolitic volcanism from the Henrys Fork caldera deposited a thick layer of rock and ash across the area. This layer compressed and hardened over time.

Between 200,000 and 600,000 years ago, the river eroded a wide canyon which was subsequently partly filled with basalt lava flows. The Henrys Fork of the Snake River then carved the channel through the basalt; which is the inner canyon seen today.

== See also ==
Video of the Upper Mesa Falls

- List of waterfalls
- List of waterfalls in Idaho
