= Bonneville flood =

Catastrophic flooding event in the last ice age

Map of Pleistocene lakes in the Western US, showing the path of the Bonneville Flood along the Snake River

The Bonneville flood was a catastrophic flooding event in the last ice age, which involved massive amounts of water inundating parts of southern Idaho and eastern Washington along the course of the Snake River. Unlike the Missoula Floods, which also occurred during the same period in the Pacific Northwest, the Bonneville flood happened only once.

== Cause and events ==
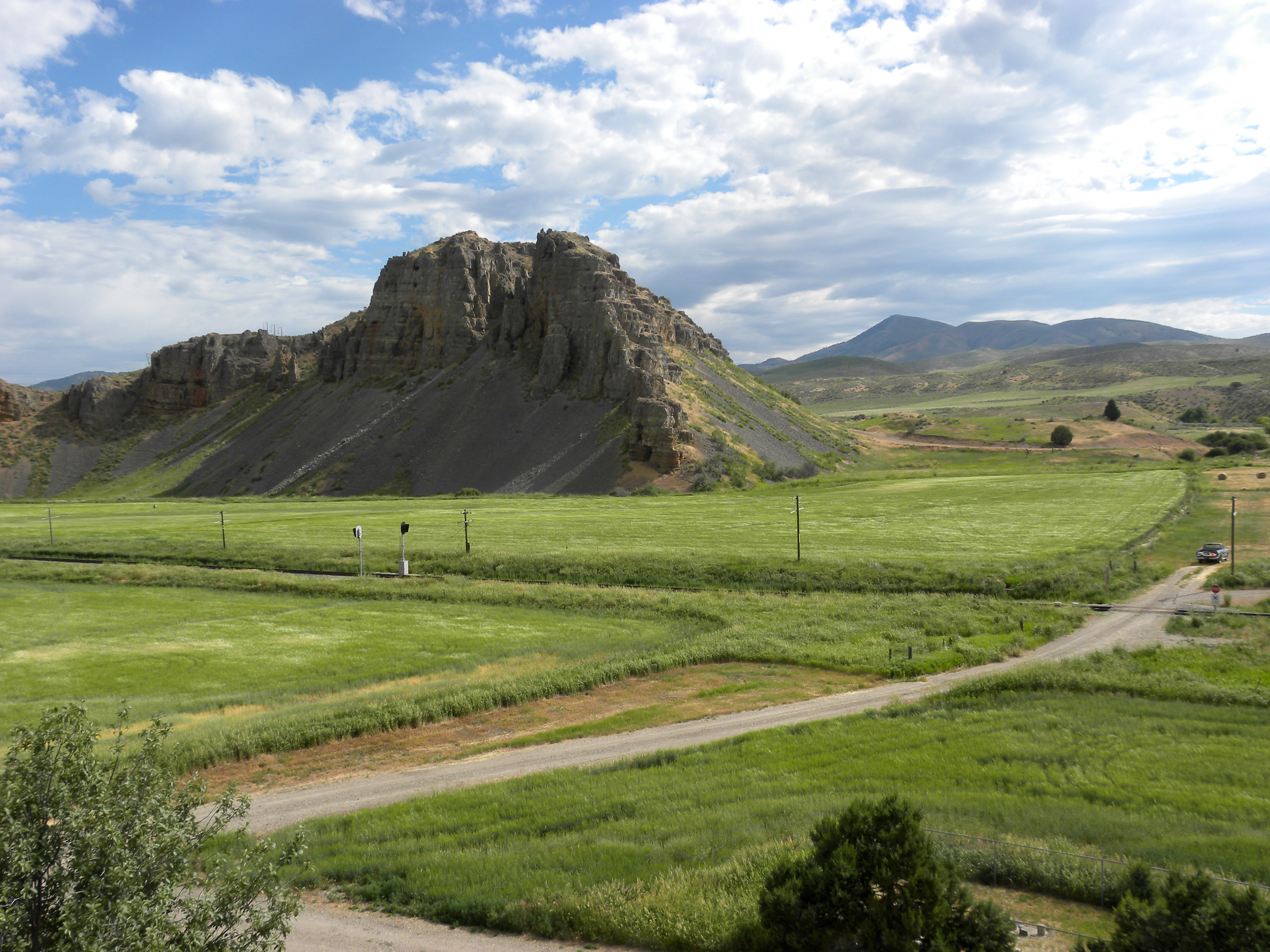
Red Rock Pass, Idaho

About 14,500 years ago (radiocarbon dating, 17,400 years ago calendar, "calibrated" dating), pluvial Lake Bonneville in northern Utah reached its highest water level since its formation. The lake occupied the present-day basin of the Great Salt Lake, and was far larger, covering about 32,000 square miles (83,000 km^{2}). As it rose the lake level caused seepage at, then breached, the ancient level of Red Rock Pass, a mountain pass at the headwaters of the Portneuf River, a tributary of the Snake River above present-day American Falls Reservoir. Ancient Red Rock Pass was the site of two alluvial fans descending from opposite sides of the notch, forming a natural dam. When the dam collapsed, it released a 410-foot-high (120 m) flood crest down the Portneuf River valley, also spilling into the neighboring Bear River valley. When it reached the Snake River, it eroded away a lava dam that had been at the site of the present-day American Falls, releasing a 40-mile-long (64 km) lake, American Falls Lake, that had formed behind the natural dam.

At the peak of the flood, approximately 33,000,000 cubic feet per second (930,000 m^{3}/s) poured over the Snake River Plain at speeds of up to 70 miles per hour (110 km/h) and deposited hundreds of cubic miles of sediments eroded from upstream. The flood scoured the 600-foot-deep (180 m) Snake River Canyon through the underlying basalt and loess soil, creating Shoshone Falls and several other waterfalls along the Snake River. It also carved and increased in size many other tributary canyons, including those of the Bruneau River and Salmon Falls Creek. The flood then entered Hells Canyon, significantly widening the gorge. Its waters eventually reached the Pacific Ocean via the Columbia River.

== Legacy ==
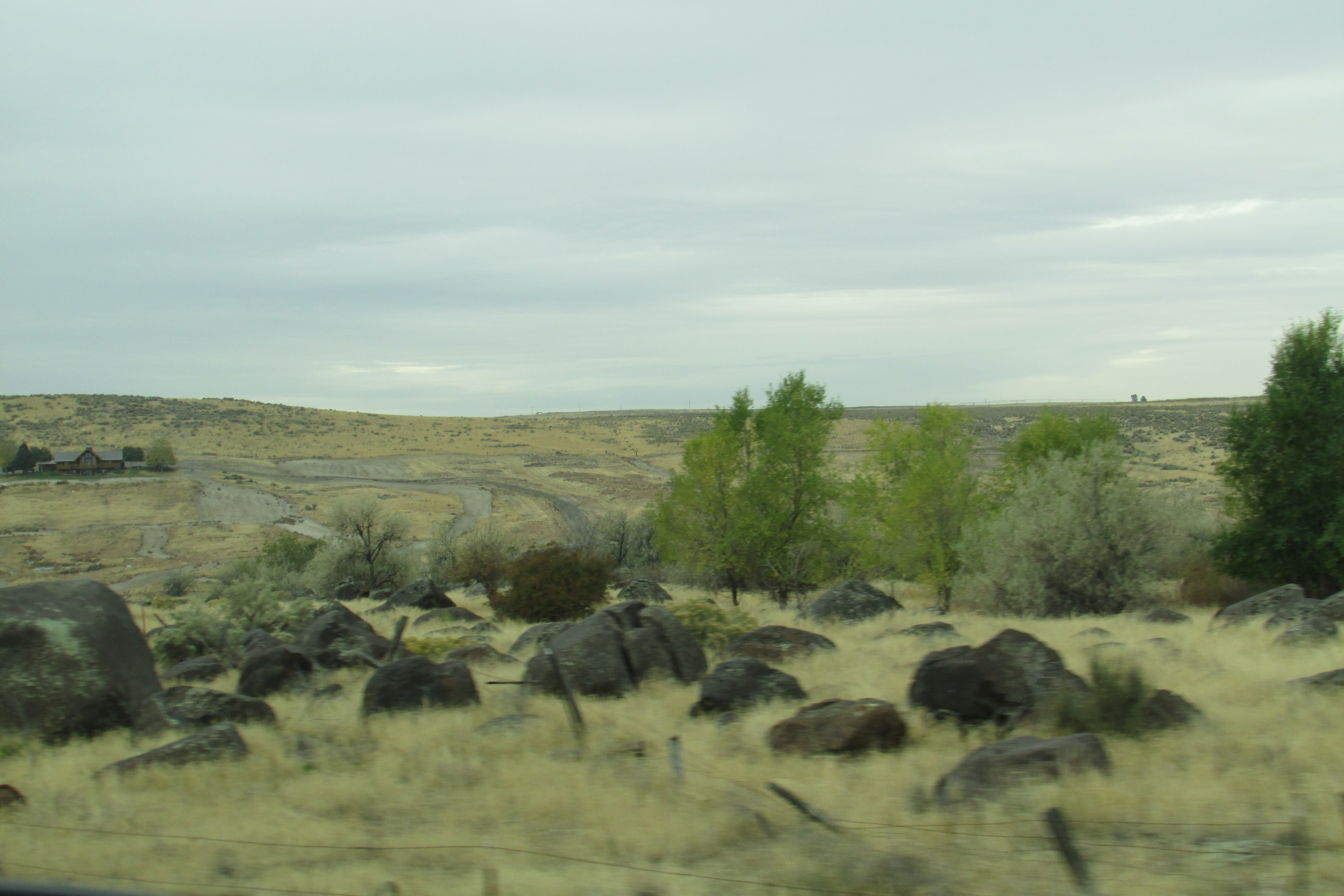
Melon Gravel on the Snake River plain at Hagerman, Idaho

Although the peak of the flood lasted a few weeks at most, erosion at Red Rock Pass continued for a few years before water ceased to spill over. The flood drained the top 351 feet (107 m) of Lake Bonneville, which constituted about 1,200 cubic miles (5,000 km^{3}) of water, and lowered the lake level to a stage known as the Provo shoreline. The flood transformed the Snake River Plain into a series of channeled scablands resembling the Columbia Plateau. Also left by the flood were the many "melon" boulders distributed throughout the canyons in the Snake River Plain. According to some geologists, the total volume of the Bonneville flood was actually greater than any individual one of the Missoula Floods, although the Missoula floods released more water as a whole, and at least one had a much higher peak flow rate.

Much of the sediment scoured by the flood was deposited near the mouth of the Snake River. It now lies beneath about 20 layers of Missoula Floods deposits.

== See also ==
- Outburst flood
- Altai flood
