= Twin Falls (Idaho) =

Waterfall on the Snake River in Twin Falls and Jerome counties in Idaho, United States

- Twin Falls as seen in 2017

- Location within the United States Location within Idaho
- Location: East of the city of Twin Falls and the Shoshone Falls
- Coordinates: 42°35′21″N 114°21′25″W
- Type: Block, Plunge
- Elevation: 3,560 feet (1,090 m)
- Total height: 200 feet (60 m)
- Number of drops: 1
- Average width: 100 feet (30 m)
- Watercourse: Snake River

Twin Falls is a waterfall on the Snake River in the Snake River Canyon of South Central Idaho on border of Twin Falls and Jerome counties. The name refers to the two parallel falls that existed prior to dam construction, of which only the north (river right) channel remains. The city of Twin Falls, located a few miles downstream, is named for the falls.

Twin Falls is located downstream of Milner Dam and upstream of Shoshone Falls and Pillar Falls.

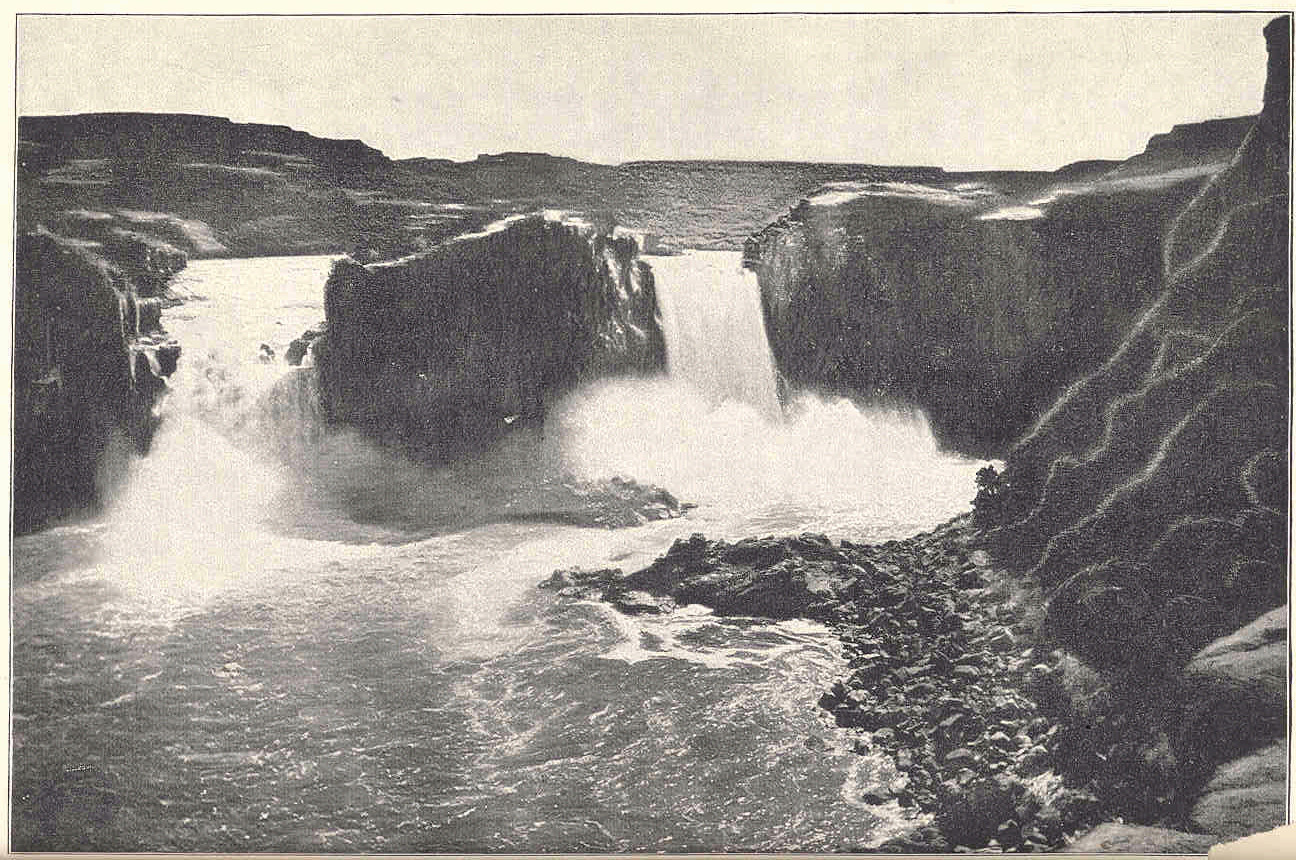
Twin Falls c. 1894, prior to the construction of Twin Falls Dam

== Twin Falls Dam ==
Twin Falls Dam
- Opening date: 1935
- Operator: Idaho Power

Dam and spillways
- Length: 789 ft (240 m)

Power Station
- Installed capacity: 52.9

Flow over Twin Falls is controlled by the Twin Falls Dam, an irrigation and hydroelectric dam that was built immediately upstream of Twin Falls in 1935. The dam permanently diverted the flow from the southern (river left) falls, reducing Twin Falls to a single waterfall on river right. Before the dam, very high flow rates could result in a third, smaller falls on river left.

== See also ==
- List of waterfalls in Idaho
