= Lower Salmon Falls Dam =

- Location within Idaho
- Location: Twin Falls County / Gooding counties, Idaho
- Coordinates: 42.841586°N 114.903696°W
- Opening date: 1910
- Operator: Idaho Power Company

Dam and spillways
- Impounds: Snake River
- Height: 38 feet (12 m)
- Length: 983 feet

Reservoir
- Total capacity: 10,900 acre-feet (13,400,000 m^{3})
- Surface area: 750 acres (1.03 km²)

Power Station
- Commission date: 1910, 1949
- Turbines: 4
- Installed capacity: 60 MW

Lower Salmon Falls Dam is a concrete gravity-type hydroelectric dam on the Lower Salmon Falls of the Snake River, in the U.S. state of Idaho. The dam is located 5 miles downstream from Upper Salmon Falls, between Gooding County and Twin Falls County, Idaho.

== History ==
The Salmon Falls includes a series of falls on the Snake River. The Lower Salmon Falls are approximately 5 miles downstream from Upper Salmon Falls, in between Gooding County and Twin Falls County, Idaho. Half of the Lower Falls have been inundated by the Lower Salmon Falls Dam.

The Lower Salmon Falls Dam was originally built in 1910 by the Greater Shoshone and Twin Falls Water Power Company. Idaho Power Company acquired the plant in 1916 and rebuilt it in 1949. It's located at river mile 573.0. Nearby cities are Twin Falls, Mountain Home, and Hailey, Idaho.

The newer dam is 983 feet long, including a 180-foot, 38-foot-high overflow dam and has a powerhouse containing four turbine generator units with a capacity of 60 MW. Its reservoir is 6.6 miles long, with a 750-acre surface area, with a storage capacity of 10,900 acre-feet. It includes a 6-foot-wide, 510-foot-long fish ladder.

Along with the Upper Salmon Falls Dam and Bliss Dam is part of Idaho Power Company's Mid-Snake Projects. The Mid-Snake Projects in total have a nameplate capacity of 169.5 MW.

== See also ==
- List of dams in the Columbia River watershed
