= Danskin Power Plant =

Coordinates: 43°10′45″N 115°44′02″W

The Danskin Power Plant is a gas-fired power plant owned and operated by Idaho Power. The plant is housed in the Evander Andrews Complex near Mountain Home, Idaho, United States.

The 261-megawatt plant consists of one 171-MW simple cycle combustion turbine, which came online in May 2008.

The first generating units on the site were two Westinghouse W251 simple cycle turbines which were commissioned .
