= Charlie Danskin =

English footballer (1893–1968)

Personal information
- Full name: Charles Danskin
- Date of birth: 29 January 1893
- Place of birth: Lemington, England
- Date of death: 1968 (aged 74–75)
- Position: Winger

Senior career*
Years	Team	Apps	(Gls)
1910–1911	Lemington Mission		
1911–1912	Scotswood		
1912–1913	Ashington		
1913–1914	Sunderland	0	(0)
1918–1919	Scotswood		
1919–1921	Stockport County	56	(6)
1921–1923	Aberdare Athletic	74	(5)
1923–1924	Luton Town	11	(0)
1924	Dragon (Pontypridd)		
Total		141	(11)
- * Club domestic league appearances and goals

Charlie Danskin (29 January 1893 – 1968) was an English footballer who played in the Football League for Aberdare Athletic, Luton Town and Stockport County.
