= Jump Creek Falls =

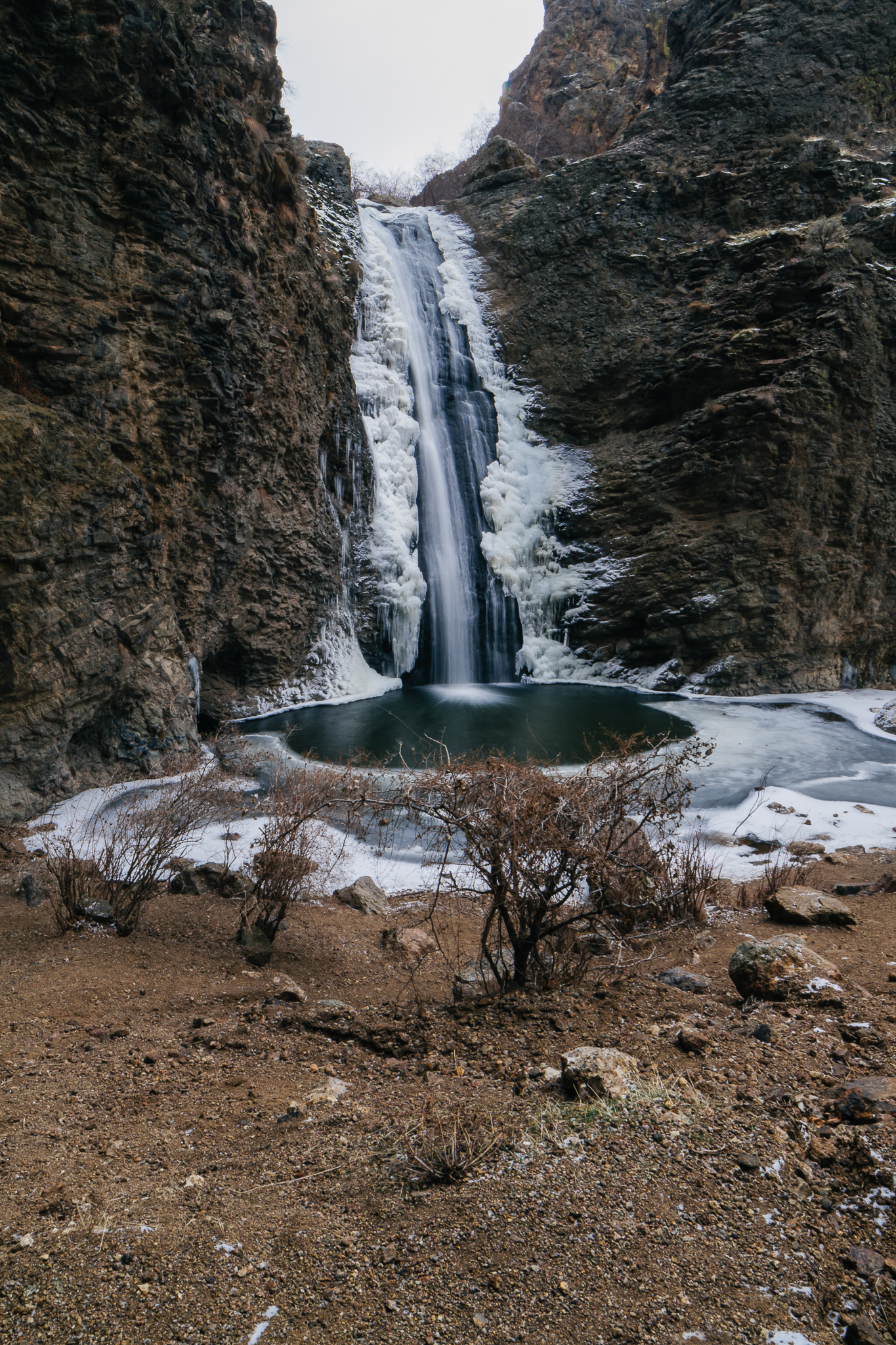
- Interactive map of Jump Creek Falls
- Location: Owyhee County, Idaho, U.S.
- Coordinates: 43°28′37″N 116°55′30″W
- Watercourse: Jump Creek

Jump Creek Falls is a waterfall in Owyhee County in the U.S. state of Idaho, just to the southwest of the city of Marsing.

== Recreation ==
The falls are accessible by a 1/4-mile hike from a lower parking lot, while an upper parking lot offers several trails that explore the falls and surrounding areas.

== See also ==
- List of waterfalls
