= Swan Falls Dam =

Dam along the Snake River in Ada and Owyhee counties in Idaho, United States

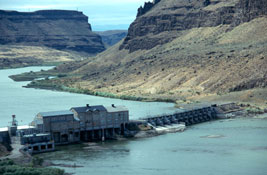

- Location in the United States Location in Idaho
- Country: United States
- Location: Ada / Owyhee counties, Idaho
- Coordinates: 43°14′36″N 116°22′46″W
- Opening date: 1901; 125 years ago
- Operator: Idaho Power Company

Dam and spillways
- Impounds: Snake River
- Height: 107 feet (33 m)
- Length: 1,150 feet (350 m)

Reservoir
- Total capacity: 7,425 acre-feet (9,159,000 m^{3})
- Catchment area: 41,900 square miles (108,500 km^{2})
- Surface area: 1,525 acres (6.17 km^{2})
- Swan Falls Dam and Power Plant
- U.S. National Register of Historic Places
- Area: 2 acres (0.81 ha)
- Built: 1900
- Architect: Wiley, A.J.
- NRHP reference No.: 76000667
- Added to NRHP: July 06, 1976

Swan Falls Dam is a concrete gravity type hydroelectric dam in the western United States, on the Snake River in southwestern Idaho, United States. At the dam, the river is the border of Ada and Owyhee counties; it is approximately five miles (8 km) east of Murphy, the seat of Owyhee County.

== Description ==
Built 125 years ago in 1901 to generate power, Swan Falls is the oldest hydroelectric dam on the Snake River. In the 1990s, the original power plant was replaced. The dam was built with fish passage facilities, but they proved to be very poor in performance. For this reason, among others, the C. J. Strike Dam, built upriver from Swan Falls in the early 1950s, was not equipped with fish passage facilities. Thus, the two dams combined to become the first artificial barrier to anadromous fish migration up the Snake River. Today, Hells Canyon Dam (1967) is the first total barrier to fish migration on the Snake.

Swan Falls Dam and its reservoir lie within the Snake River Birds of Prey National Conservation Area; the dam and power plant were listed in the National Register of Historic Places in 1976.

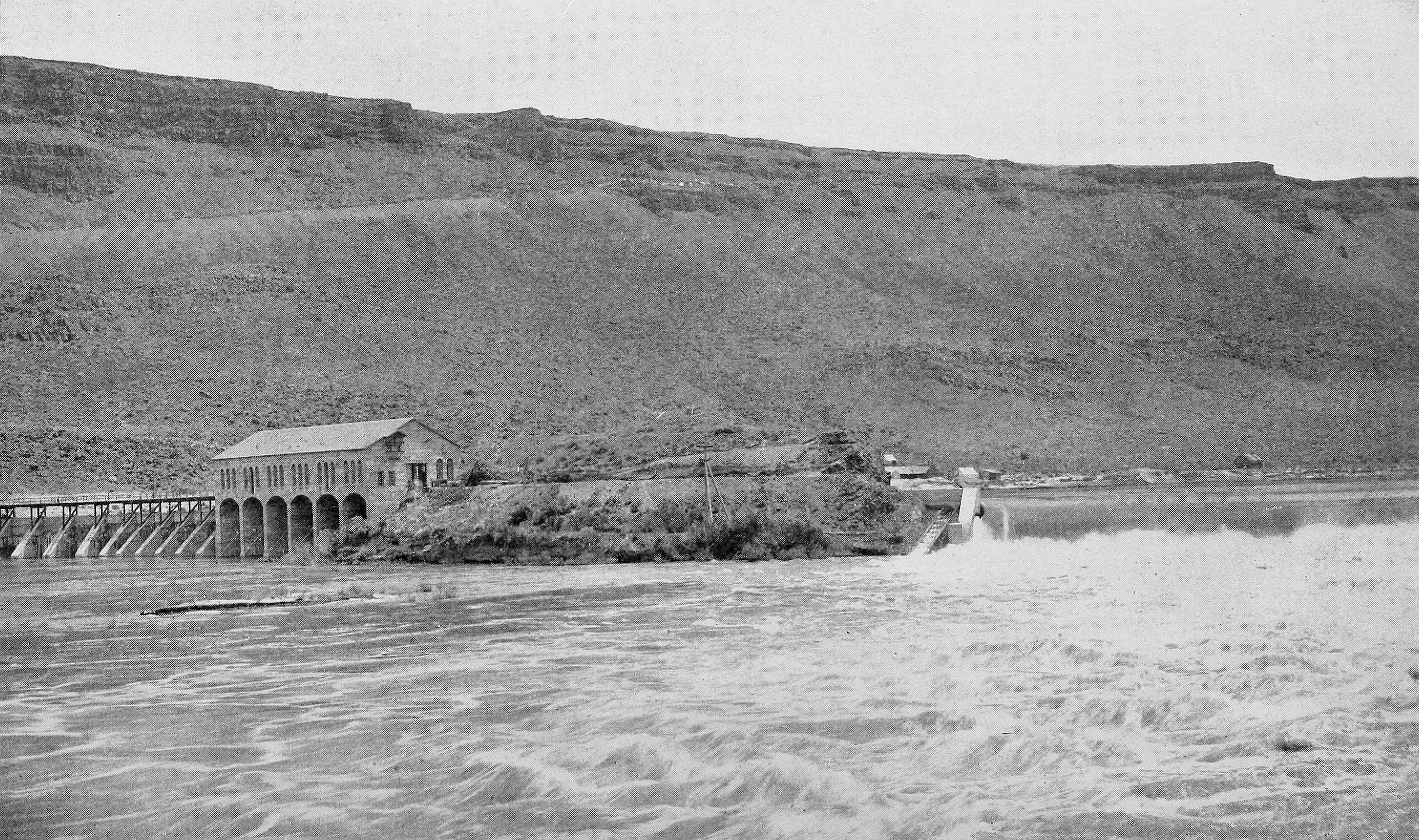
1904

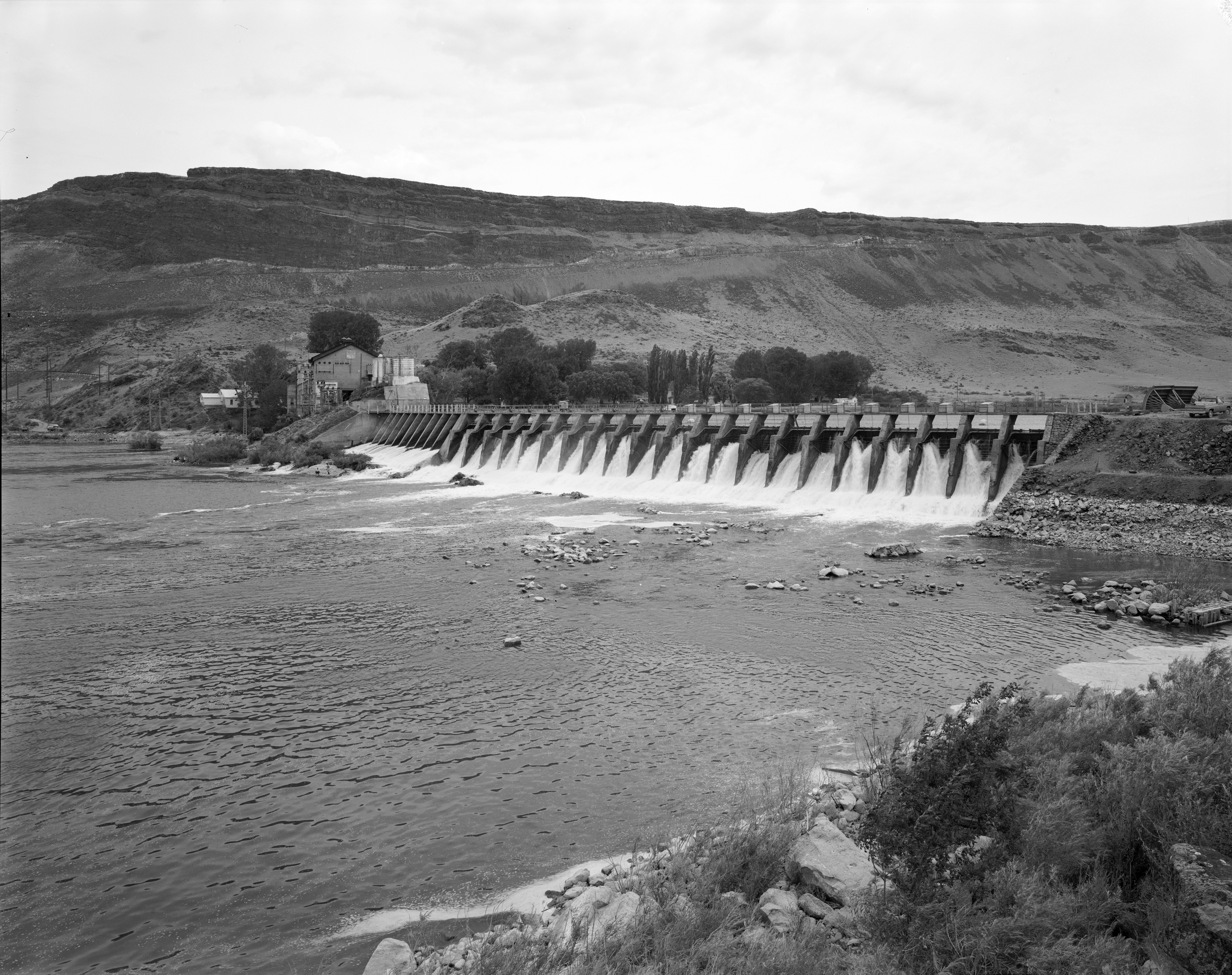

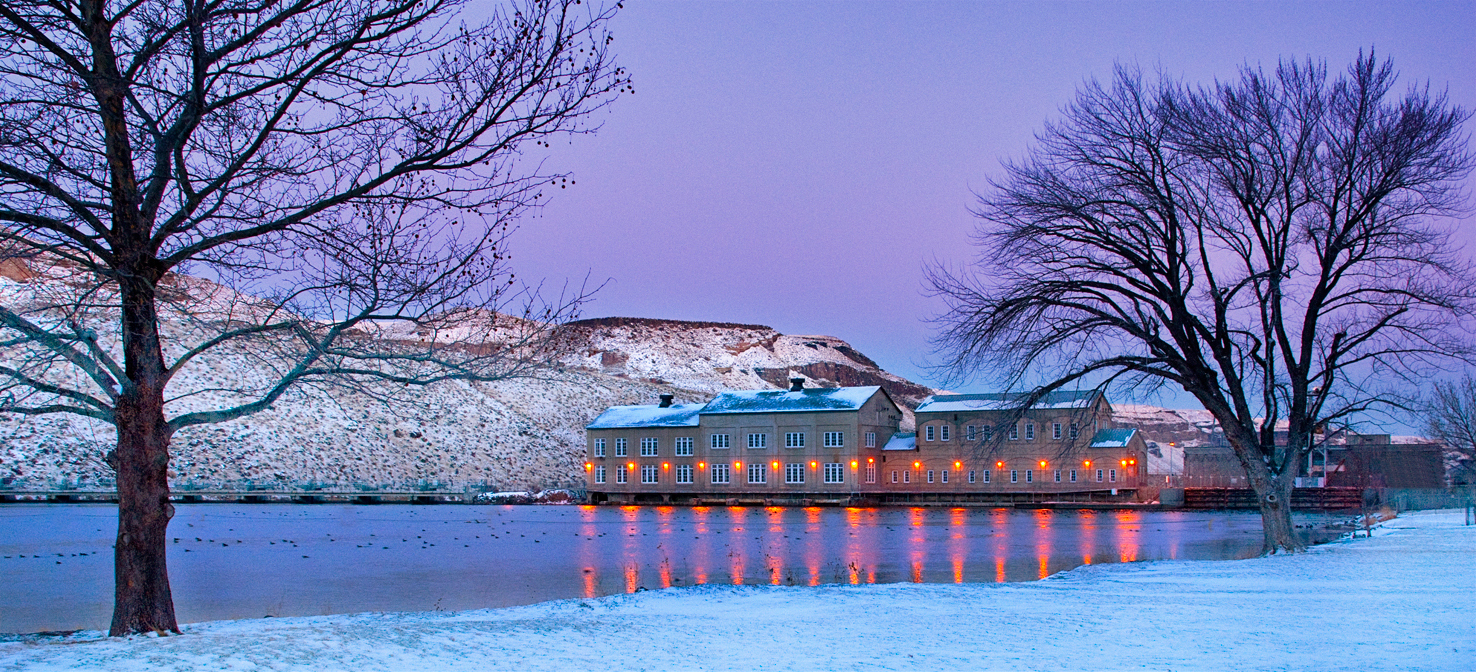
Swan Falls Dam at sunrise

== See also ==
- List of dams and reservoirs in Idaho
- List of dams in the Columbia River watershed
