= Salmon Falls (Snake River) =

Salmon Falls is the series of falls on the Snake River, in Twin Falls County, Idaho, comprising the Upper Salmon Falls and Lower Salmon Falls, near Hagerman. The Upper Salmon Falls are about 40 miles West of Shoshone Falls, in between Gooding County and Twin Falls County, Idaho, USA. It is situated ≈ 25 miles below Anger Falls.

Lower Salmon Falls is about 5 miles downstream from Upper Salmon Falls. The Lower Falls have been cut off by the Lower Salmon Falls Dam and most of it inundated by the reservoir.

- Upper Salmon Falls: 42°46′00″N 114°53′50″W
- Lower Salmon Falls: 42°50′35″N 114°54′15″W

== See also ==
- List of waterfalls
- List of waterfalls in Idaho
