= Pillar Falls =

Waterfalls in the state of Idaho

Coordinates: 42°35′57″N 114°25′55″W

Pillar Falls is a waterfall near Twin Falls, Idaho. Several basalt pillars divide the Snake River into multiple channels, through which the river drops about 20 feet (6 m).

== Gallery ==
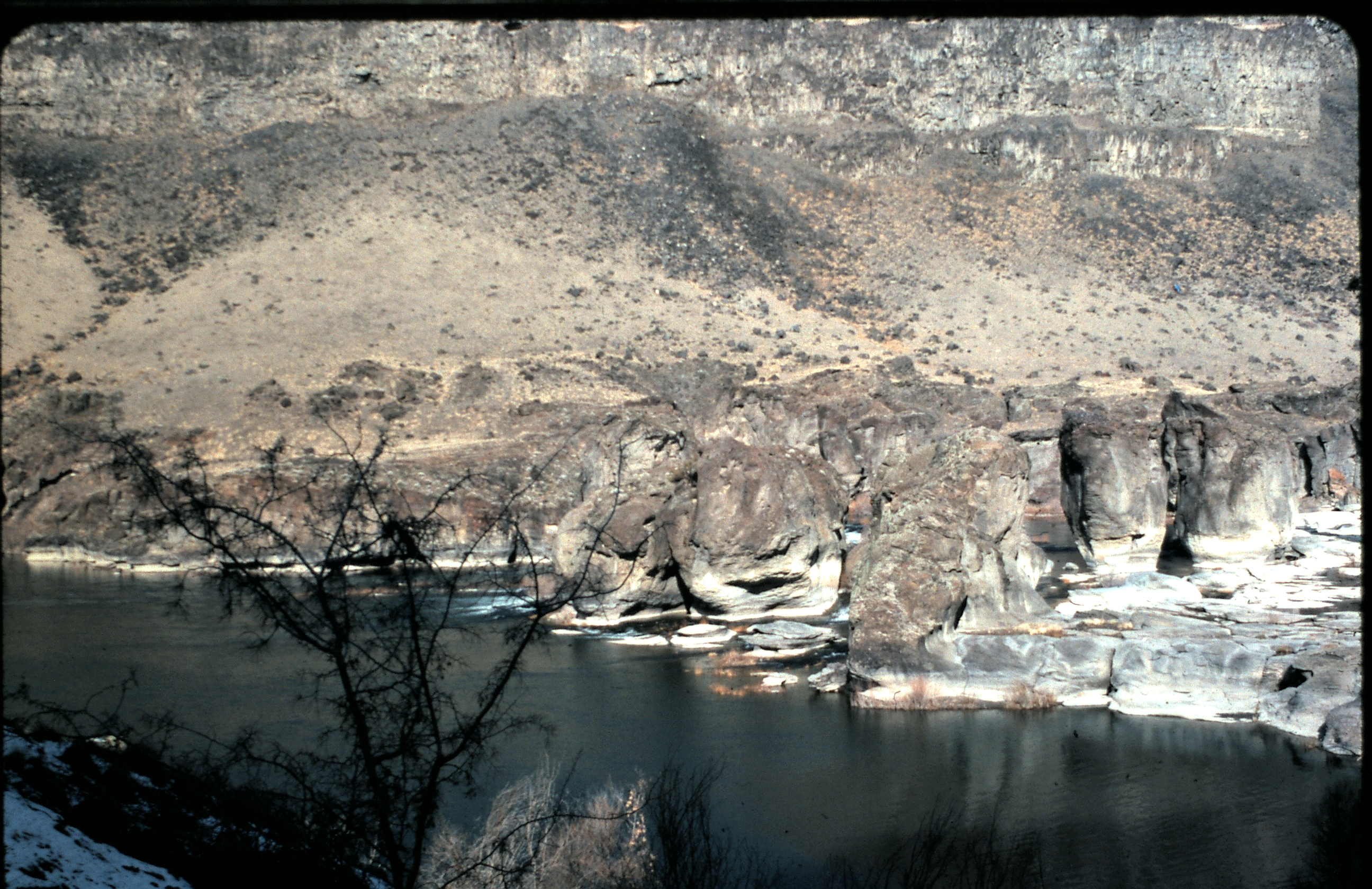
Pillar Falls - Snake River Canyon, Twin Falls, Idaho

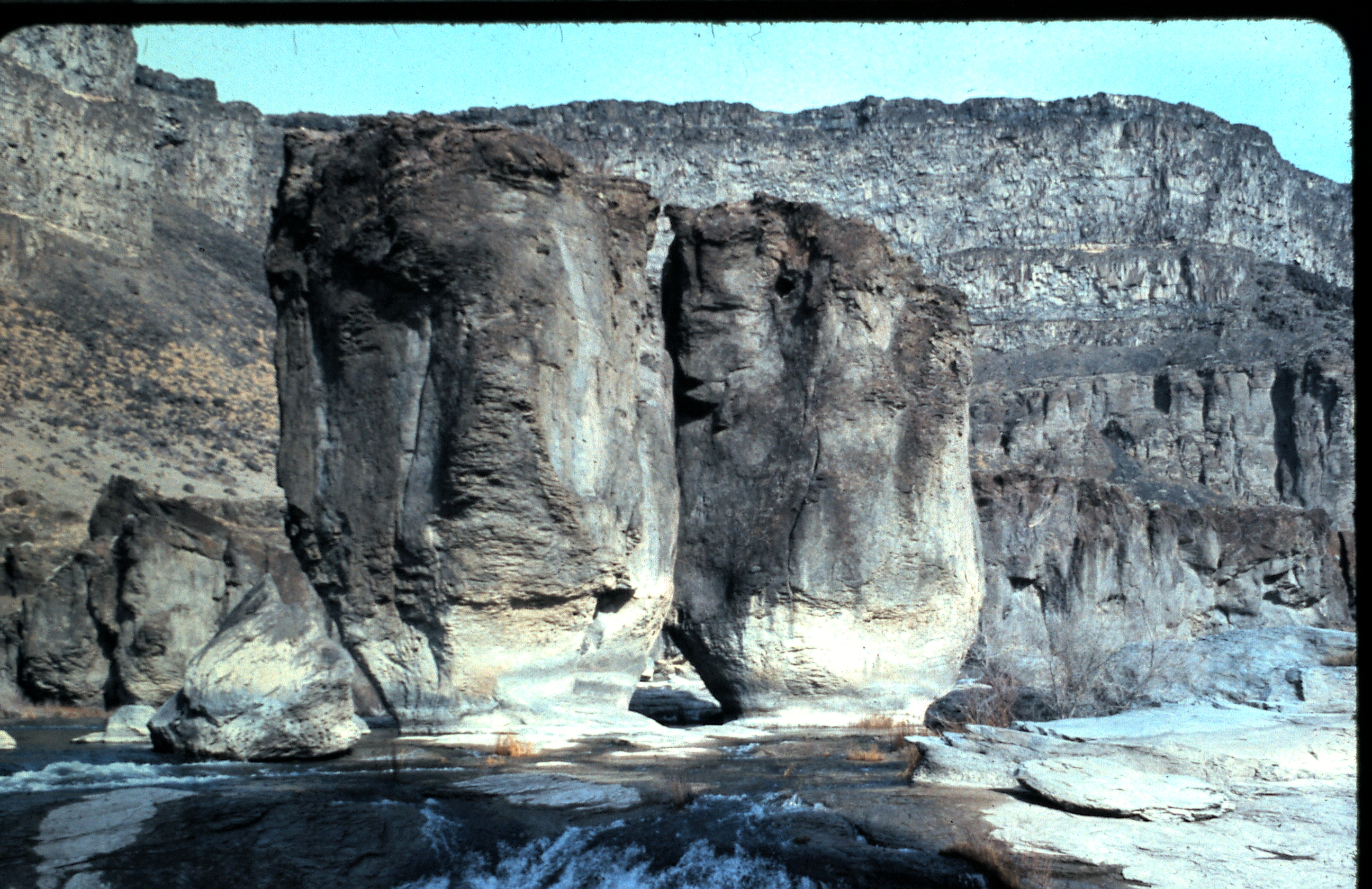
Pillars Pillar Falls - Snake River Canyon, Twin Falls, Idaho

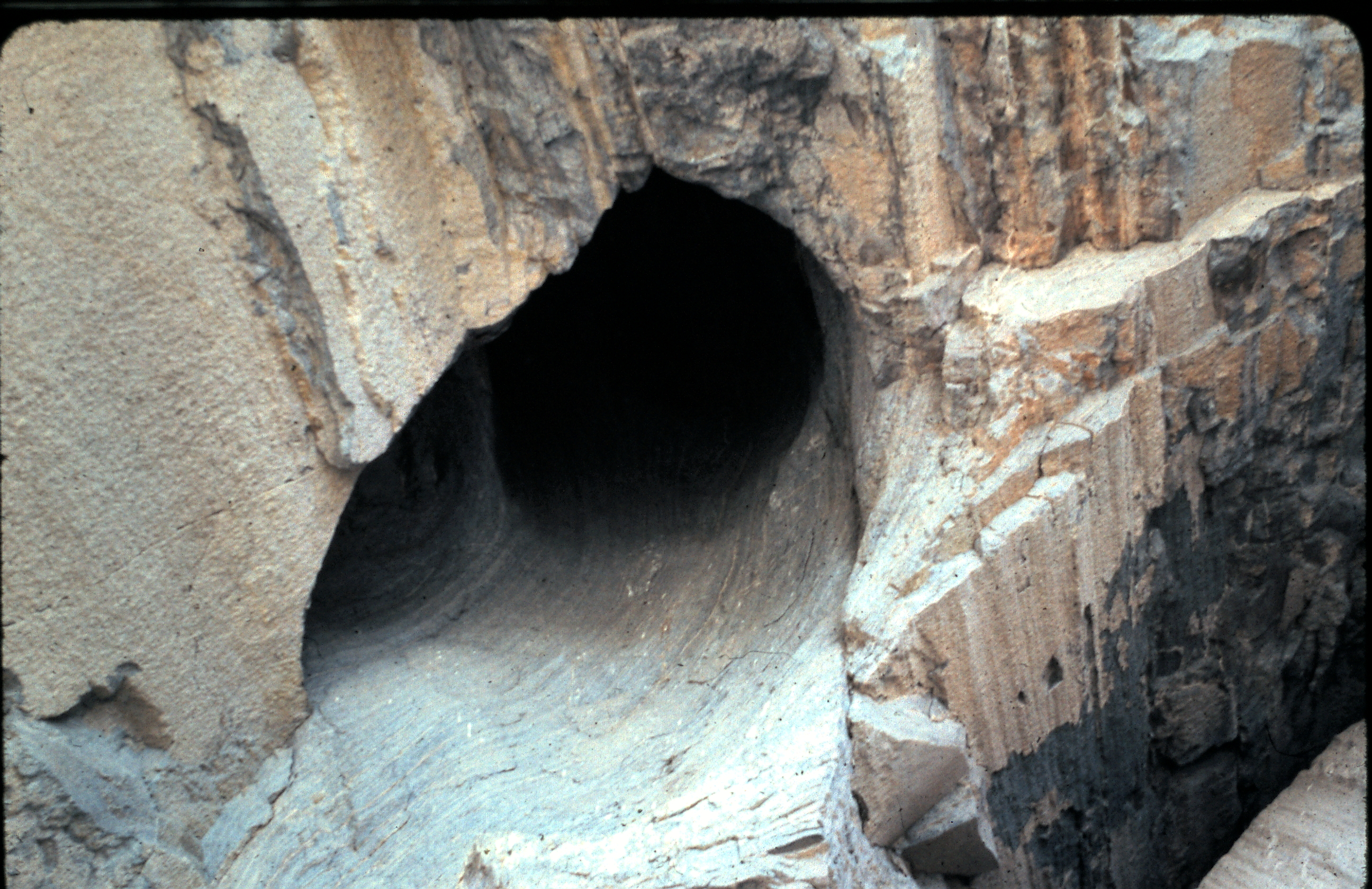
Cave at Pillar Falls - Snake River Canyon, Twin Falls, Idaho

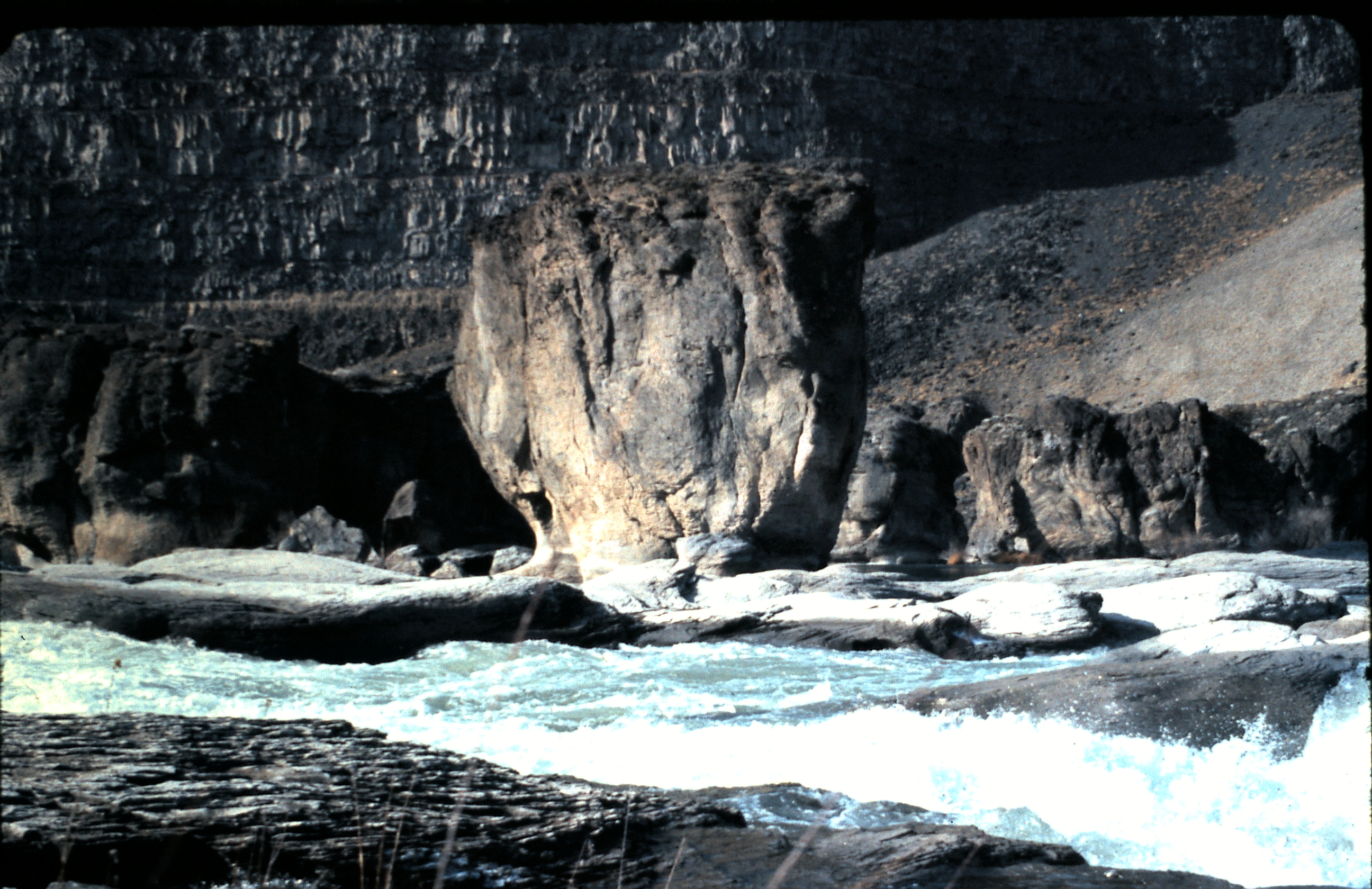
Snake River at Pillar Falls - Snake River Canyon, Twin Falls, Idaho

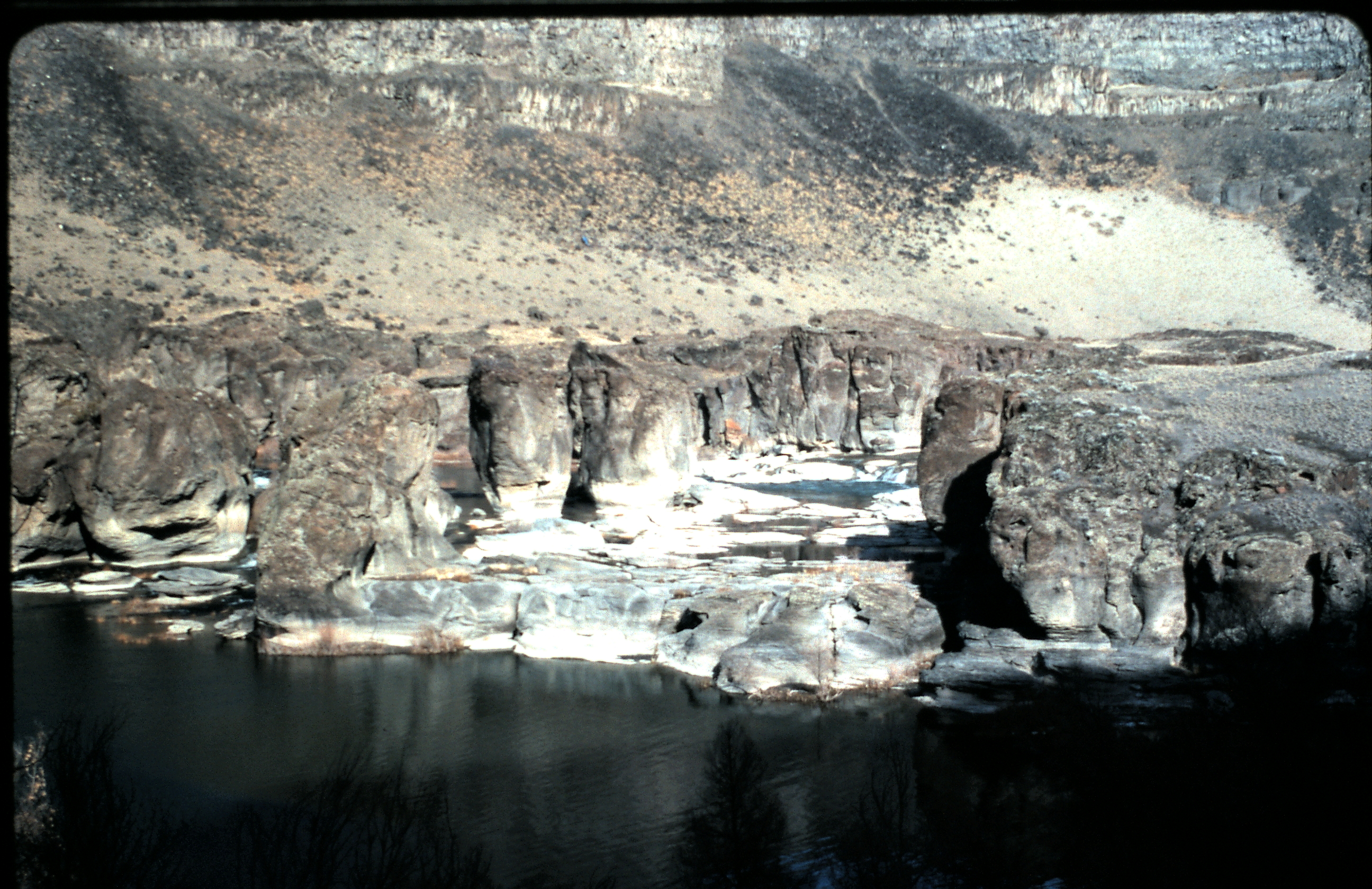
Pillar Falls - Snake River Canyon, Twin Falls, Idaho

== See also ==
- List of waterfalls
- List of waterfalls in Idaho
