= Idaho Power =

US electrical power utility

Idaho Power Company
- Company type: Subsidiary
- Industry: Electrical generation, transmission, distribution
- Founded: May 6, 1915
- Headquarters: Boise, Idaho, United States
- Key people: Lisa Grow, President and Chief Executive Officer, IDACORP, Inc. and Idaho Power
- Number of employees: 2050 full time employees (2021)
- Parent: IDACORP, Inc
- Website: www.idahopower.com

Idaho Power Company (IPC) is a regulated electrical power utility. Its business involves the purchase, sale, generation, transmission and distribution of electricity in eastern Oregon and southern Idaho. It is a subsidiary of IDACORP, Inc. The company's 24,000-square-mile (62,000 km^{2}) service area generally follows the area around the Snake River and its tributaries.

Idaho Power owns and operates 17 hydroelectric dams and three natural gas power plants. IPC also owns shares of one coal-fired power plants.

In 2023, electricity sold by IPC was 36.8% hydroelectric, 15.4% natural gas, 13.0% coal, 9.8% wind, 5.4% solar, and, 2.3% geothermal, biomass & other, and 17.3% purchased from other generation companies.

== History ==
Idaho Power Company originally filed for incorporation in Maine on May 6, 1915. It was reincorporated in Idaho as a subsidiary of IDACORP, Inc on October 1, 1998. This was followed by the purchase of the assets of five small southern Idaho power companies: Idaho-Oregon Light & Power; Great Shoshone and Twin Falls Water Power; Idaho Railway, Light & Power; Idaho Power & Light; and Southern Idaho Water Power Company.

In 2018 Idaho Power sponsored the annual "Drive Electric Week" car show event at the state capitol. At the show people can learn about electric vehicles. Interest in electric vehicles has increased because of changing gas prices, improvements in battery technology, concerns for the environment and federal tax incentives for buying electric vehicles. To respond to customer interest, Idaho Power added tools to its website to guide customers investigating purchasing an electric vehicle.

In 2019, Idaho Power set a goal to provide 100-percent clean energy by 2045. In addition to its hydropower facilities, which typically meet almost half its customers’ energy demands, Idaho Power plans additional investments in wind, solar and other clean sources. Clean energy resources are becoming more affordable, which could help Idaho Power accomplish its goal while keeping prices fair. Grid upgrades and battery-storage technology should help maintain Idaho Power's impressive reliability while moving the company closer to its goal. Continued energy efficiency efforts will help. Clean energy initiatives are not new to Idaho Power. In 2009, the company adopted a resolution to reduce carbon emissions. Idaho Power has reduced its carbon emissions intensity — measured in pounds of carbon dioxide (CO_{2}) per megawatt-hour — by almost 50 percent since 2005. The company has entered agreements to end participation in two coal plants and is exploring exiting a third — and final — coal plant.

== Hydroelectricity ==
IPC's 17 hydroelectric power plants have a generation nameplate capacity of 1,988,615 kilowatts, and it is one of the nation's few investor-owned utilities with a significant hydroelectric generating base. Four-fifths of Idaho's electricity generation is from hydroelectric. Idaho Power built the majority of its hydroelectric facilities during the 1940s, 1950s, and 1960s, culminating with completion of the three-dam Hells Canyon Complex (Brownlee Dam, Oxbow Dam, then Hells Canyon Dam) in 1968.

- American Falls Dam power plant at river mile 714.7.
- Milner Dam power plant at river mile 639.1.
- Twin Falls power plant at river mile 617.4.
- Shoshone Falls power plant at river mile 614.7.
- Clear Lake power plant at river mile 593.0.
- Thousand Springs power plant at river mile 584.7.
- "Mid-Snakes Project" in Central Idaho on the Snake River consisting of the Upper Salmon Falls power plant (river mile 580.8), the Lower Salmon Falls power plant (river mile 573.0), and the Bliss Dam power plant at river mile 560.3.
- "The Malads": Upper Malad and Lower Malad power plants at river mile 571.2.
- Cascade Dam power plant on the Payette River.
- C. J. Strike Dam power plant at river mile 494.0.
- Swan Falls Dam power plant at river mile 457.7.
- "Hells Canyon Complex": Brownlee Dam power plant at river mile 285.0, Oxbow Dam power plant at river mile 272, and the Hells Canyon Dam power plant at river mile 251.

== See also ==
- List of companies based in Idaho
