= Bliss Dam =

- Location within Idaho
- Interactive map of Bliss Dam
- Location: Elmore / Gooding counties, Idaho
- Coordinates: 42°54′49″N 115°4′14″W
- Construction began: 1948
- Opening date: 1950
- Operator: Idaho Power Company

Dam and spillways
- Impounds: Snake River
- Height: 70 feet (21 m)
- Length: 615 feet (187 m)

Reservoir
- Total capacity: 11,000 acre-feet (14,000,000 m^{3})
- Catchment area: 35,200 sq mi (91,200 km²)
- Surface area: 254 acres (1.03 km²)

Bliss Dam is a concrete gravity-type hydroelectric dam on the Snake River, in the U.S. state of Idaho. The dam is located near Bliss, Idaho.

Along with the Upper Salmon Falls and Lower Salmon Falls dam projects, Bliss Dam is part of Idaho Power Company's Mid-Snake Projects. The Mid-Snake Projects in total have a nameplate capacity of 169.5 MW.

== See also ==
- List of dams in the Columbia River watershed
