= List of dam removals in the United States =

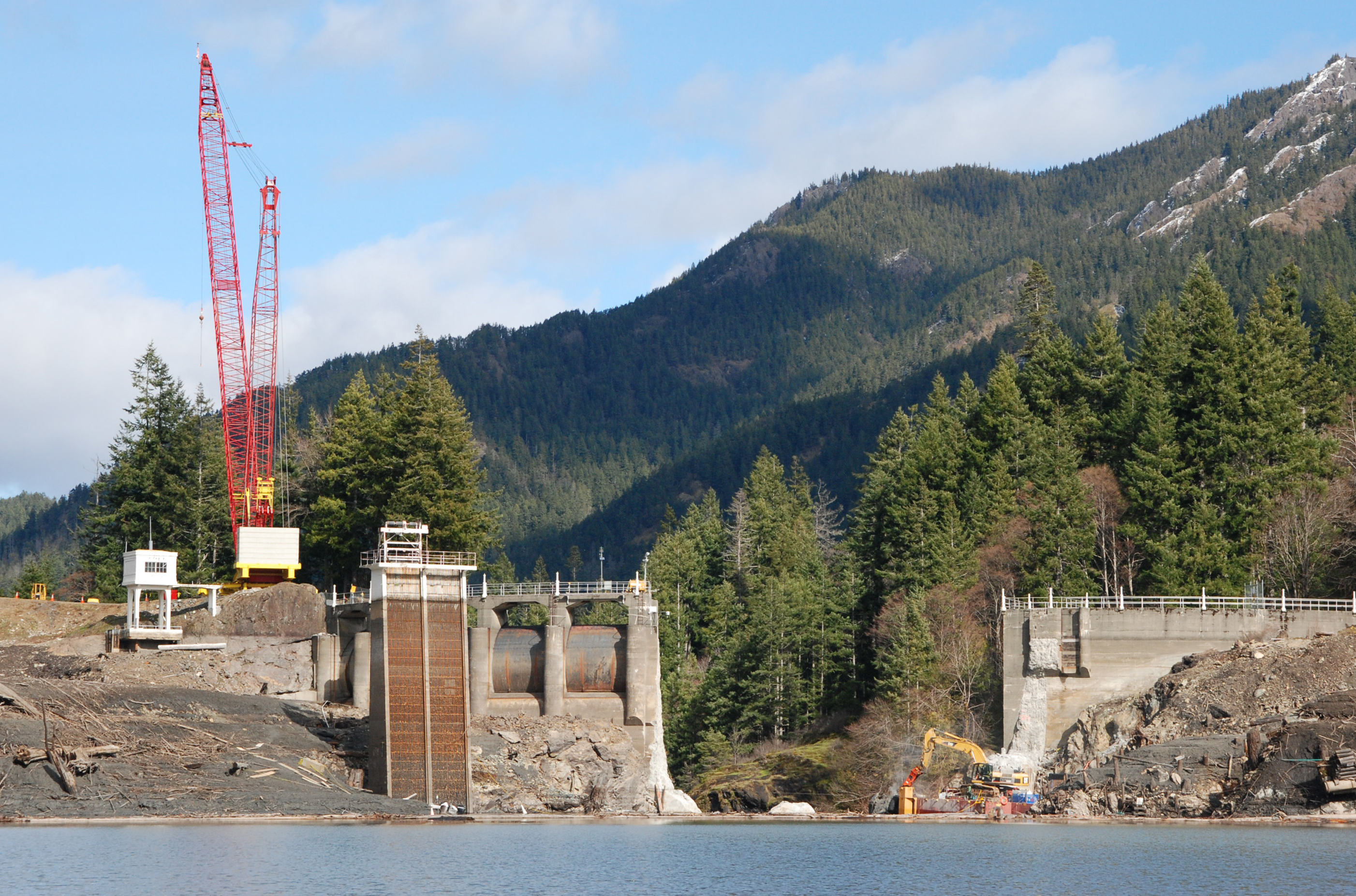
The Glines Canyon Dam, the tallest dam ever to be intentionally demolished, shown mid-demolition in 2012

This is a list of dams in the United States that have been removed as physical impediments to free-flowing rivers or streams. Dams are not included if they have instead failed, or if they have been decommissioned but not yet removed. Dam removal takes many forms, and some removals may leave structures behind or alter the natural course of a river.

According to the non-profit advocacy organization American Rivers, 2,119 dams were removed in the United States between 1912 and 2023. The peak year was 2018, which saw 109 removals. Pennsylvania removed 390 dams in this period, more than any other state. Mississippi is the only state with no documented dam removals.

== Removals by watershed ==
=== Boardman River ===
The 46-foot (14 m) Brown Bridge Dam, 56-foot (17 m) Boardman Dam, and 34-foot (10 m) Sabin Dam were removed from the Boardman River in Michigan as part of the Boardman River Dams Ecosystem Restoration Project after their hydropower was decommissioned in 2005.

=== Coastal Southern California ===
==== Proposed removals ====
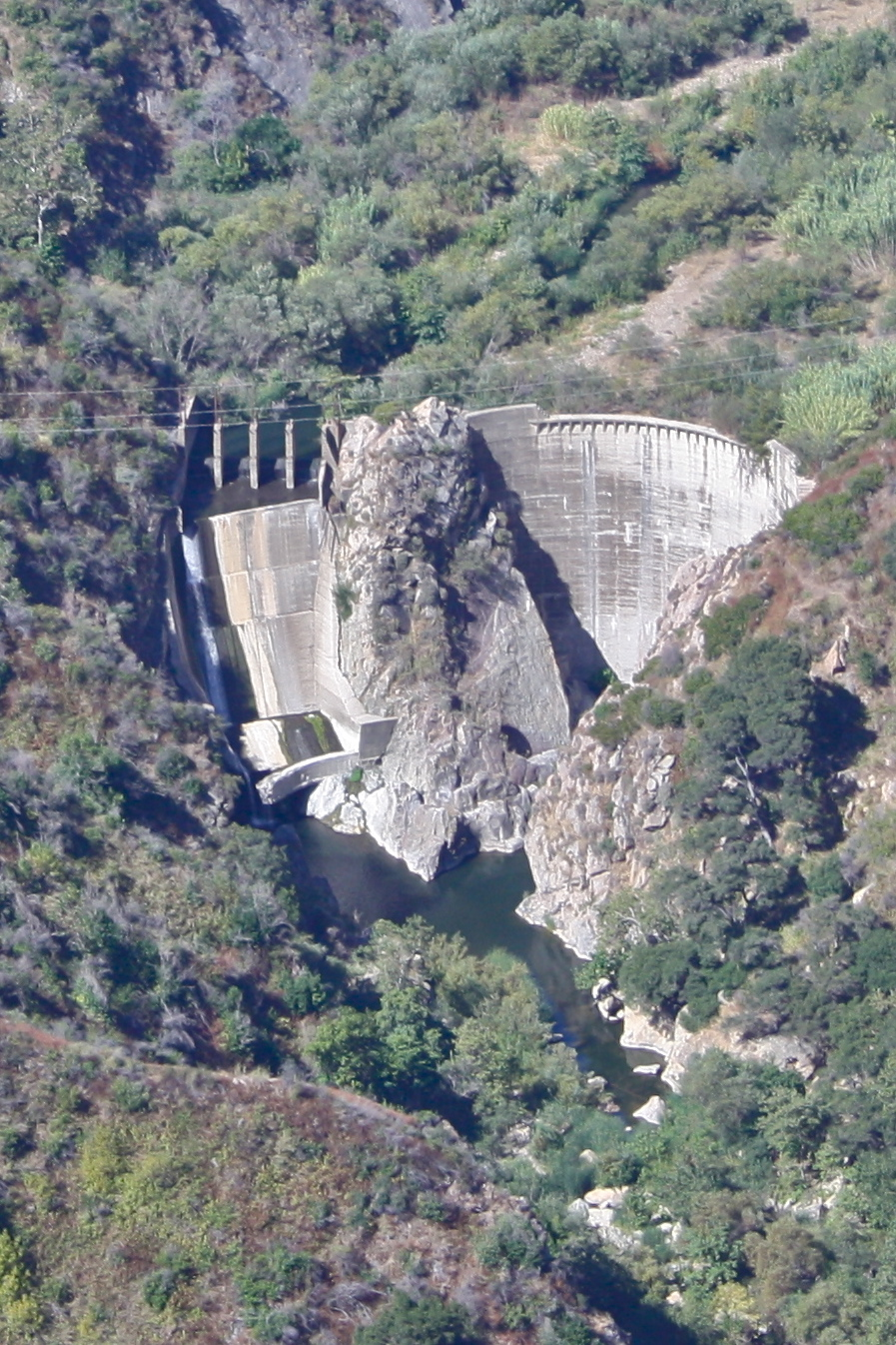
Rindge Dam near Malibu, California, built in 1924, completely silted and abandoned by the 1950s

The 100 ft (30 m) privately owned Rindge Dam on Malibu Creek in the Santa Monica Mountains of California was built in 1924 and has been allowed to completely fill with sediment, making it functionally obsolete but still a potential hazard. Malibu Creek once supported the southernmost steelhead population in the world. But today, steelhead no longer occupy the creek.

The similar 1947 Matilija Dam near Ojai, California was built against the advice of the U.S. Army Corps of Engineers, among others, and also blocked steelhead trout spawning grounds. After being notched twice and largely silted up, 90% of its design capacity has been lost. As of 2013 stakeholders agree that the dam and its sediment be removed, but no funding source has been identified.

=== Colorado River ===
Built in 1916, the 25-foot (7.6 m) Fossil Creek Dam supported hydroelectric power production on Fossil Creek, a tributary of the Salt River via the Verde River. The dam was removed in 2008 to restore flow, travertine deposition, and native fish populations.

==== Proposed removals ====
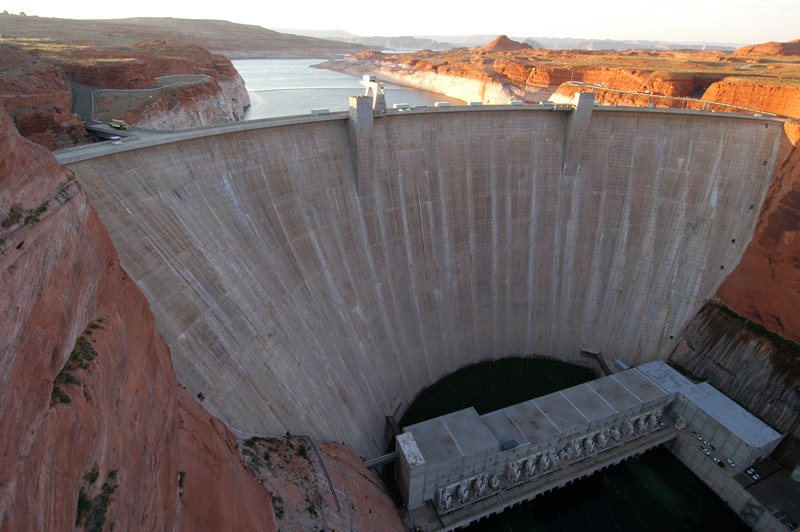
Glen Canyon Dam

The 710 ft (220 m) Glen Canyon Dam has been proposed for removal because of the negative effects it has on the water quality and riparian habitat of the Colorado River in Grand Canyon National Park. In addition, the reservoir impounded behind it, Lake Powell has filled all of the canyons for up to 160 miles (260 km) above the dam. This lake, while providing recreational opportunities, has eliminated more than 160 miles (260 km) of habitat for endangered Colorado River fish species.

The reservoir also loses more than 6 percent of the total annual flow of the Colorado River to evaporation and seepage. Advocates of dam removal such as the Glen Canyon Institute also cite these losses of stored water as reason to decommission the dam. If it were to be removed, it would dwarf any completed dam removal project in history.

=== Columbia River ===
On the South Fork Clearwater River, the Grangeville Dam was a 56-foot-tall (17 m), 440-foot-long (130 m) arched concrete hydroelectric dam constructed by the Washington Water Power Company in 1911. A wooden fish ladder had been installed but it collapsed in 1949. The dam was removed in the interest of fish passage and since the hydropower facilities had become obsolete. The dam was destroyed by dynamite at 6:35 PM on August 19, 1963, following two prior detonations that day which had failed to collapse the structure. At the time, the dam was the largest ever to be removed, a record which stood for decades.

In 1971 the 39 ft (12 m) tall Lewiston Dam was removed from the main stem of the Clearwater River just above its confluence with the Snake River. Built in 1927 as a hydroelectric facility, the dam lacked fish ladders and was rendered obsolete by the downstream Lower Granite Dam.

On the White Salmon River, the 123 ft (37 m) Condit Dam blocked access for Pacific Salmon and steelhead runs on 33 miles (53 km) of river. PacifiCorp proposed to remove the dam, rather than paying for fish passage upgrades. Removal was proposed in 2006, but actions from Skamania and Klickitat counties held up the process. In fall 2008, salmon were trucked up above to dam to allow them to spawn higher up the river. In October 2011, PacifiCorp contractors used explosives to blow a 15-foot (4.6 m) hole in the dam to drain its reservoir and allow young salmon to enter the Columbia River and head to sea.

The 21-foot (6.4 m) Milltown Dam lay the junction of the Clark Fork River and Blackfoot River in Montana. The dam held very high levels of toxic sediments from 100 years of mining and logging. Its 2008 removal improved water quality, trout habitat, and the general ecological condition of the watershed.

On the Sandy River in Oregon, the 50-foot (15 m) tall Marmot Dam was removed by Portland General Electric in 2007. Its removal has been extremely successful at improving access for Pacific Salmon and steelhead to the upper Sandy River watershed up into the Mount Hood Wilderness.

The Cowlitz Indian Tribe removed the 55-foot (17 m) Kwoneesum Dam on Wildboy Creek, a tributary of the Washougal River, in 2024.

==== Proposed removals ====
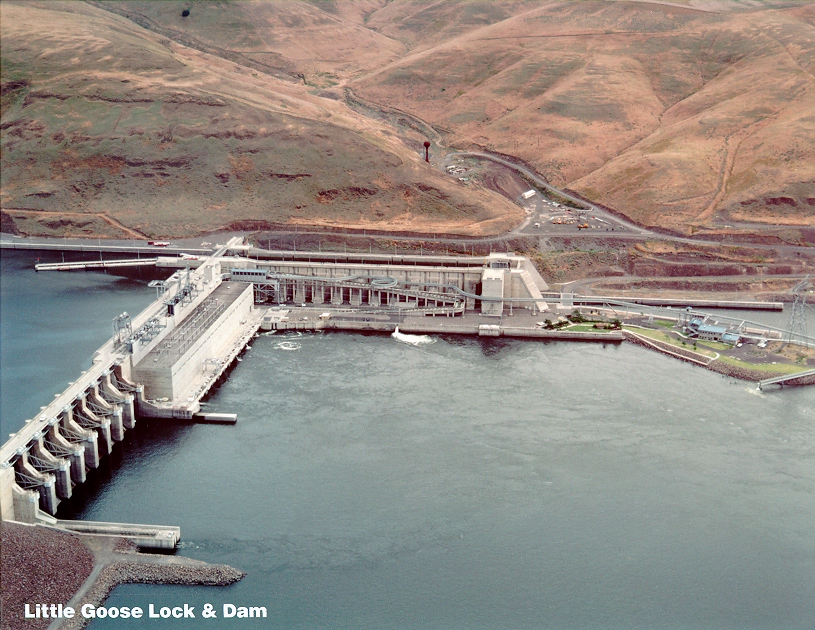
Little Goose Dam, Washington, United States

Four dams along the lower Snake River, built and still operated by the United States Army Corps of Engineers, serve as hydroelectric power sources as well as maintaining an inland port at Lewiston, Idaho for agricultural barge traffic. The four are candidates for removal because of millions of cubic yards accumulated behind the dams, which are raising water levels for riverside cities. They include: the 1975 100 ft (30 m) Lower Granite Dam, the 1970 98 ft (30 m) Little Goose Dam, the 1969 100 ft (30 m) Lower Monumental Dam, and the 1962 100 ft (30 m) Ice Harbor Dam.

Three million new cubic yards of sediment are deposited behind the lower four dams on the Snake River annually. The city of Lewiston, Idaho and others along the Snake have built a system of levees maintained by the Army Corps of Engineers. The levees in Lewiston were designed to leave five feet between water levels and the top of the levees. As of 2011, two feet remained. As water levels continue to rise, either some of the dams must be removed or dredged, or the municipal levees will continue to be raised. The Corps admits that the amount of sediment in the riverbed is too great for dredging to be effective, and Lewiston community leaders are worried that higher levees will further cut the town off from its rivers. The Corps began dredging behind Lower Granite Dam in 2015.

=== Elwha River ===
The Elwha Ecosystem Restoration project on the Olympic Peninsula of Washington started in 2012, and finished in 2014, the 108-foot (33 m) Elwha Dam and the 210-foot (64 m) Glines Canyon Dam were removed to restore stocks of Pacific Salmon and trout species to the Elwha River watershed. The removal of these blockades allows migratory salmon to travel past the dam sites and upriver, an event that has not occurred since the dams' creation in 1913. After spawning there, the salmon die and their carcasses decompose, releasing marine nutrients laid down in their bodies as they fed in the open ocean. This reintroduction provides a valuable research opportunity for interested parties. Since the dam removal, reservoir beds that looked like moonscapes have returned to vibrant rich habitat. Within a year of the Elwha Dam removal, an increase in salmon-derived nutrients was documented in the American dipper.

=== Klamath River ===
After more than 20 years of advocacy from the Un-Dam the Klamath movement, the largest dam removal in history started, the first of four dams – the Copco Number 2 Dam – was removed in fall 2023, and the removal project was completed in August 2024.

=== Rogue River ===
In 2008, the 80-foot (24 m) tall Elk Creek Dam was removed from the Elk Creek tributary to the Rogue River.

=== Tuolumne River ===
==== Proposed removals ====
O'Shaughnessy Dam in California was completed in 1923 and represented the first great environmental controversy in the US as it was constructed in a national park. The debate over the dam and reservoir continues today. Preservationist groups such as the Sierra Club lobby for the restoration of the valley, while others argue that leaving the dam in place would be the better economic and environmental decision.

=== St. Croix River ===
==== Proposed removals ====
The Upper "Junction Falls" Dam on the Kinnickinnic River in River Falls, Wisconsin as it appears today. The Historic Junction Falls are obscured by its presence, the lowest ledge of the Junction Falls now sits as the dry ledge below the base of the dam.

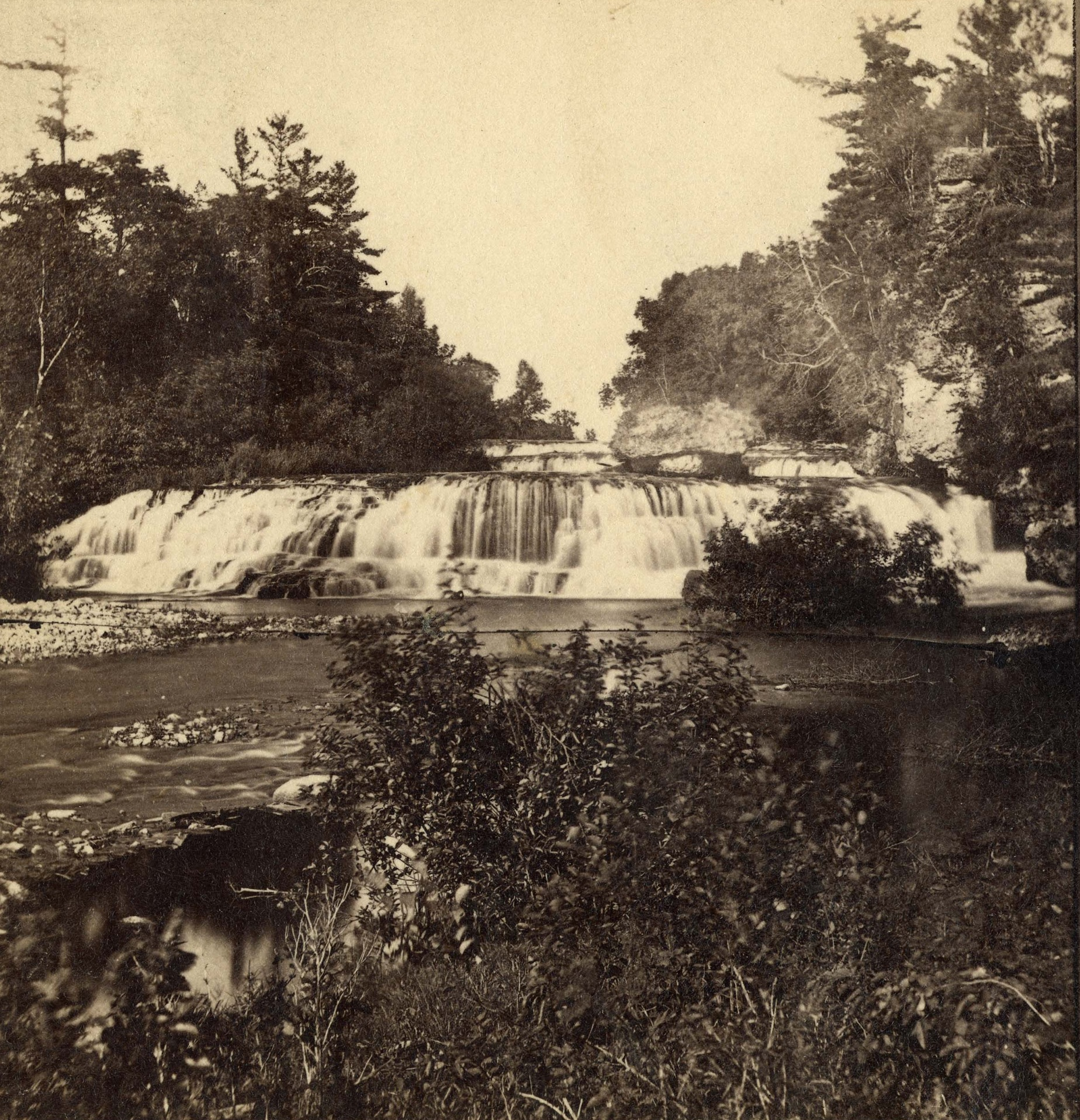
The historic Junction Falls of the yet-undammed Kinnickinnic River in River Falls, Wisconsin. Photograph taken by John Carbutt between 1864 and 1865 and published as a stereoview in a set of scenery pictures of "The Upper Mississippi, Minnesota and the Vicinity".

The two remaining dams on the Kinnickinnic River in River Falls, Wisconsin are being considered for removal in order to completely restore the Kinnickinnic River to its natural state. The Kinnickinnic River, called the Kinni for short, is a 22-mile-long (35 km) river in northwestern Wisconsin in the United States. The Kinni is a cold water fishery supporting a population of native Brook Trout and naturally reproducing Brown Trout. The Kinnickinnic River is officially designated as a Class I trout stream by the WI DNR, indicating it is a "high quality" trout water that has sufficient natural reproduction to sustain populations of wild trout, at or near carrying capacity. The Kinnickinnic is also designated as an Outstanding Resource Water (ORW) by the WI DNR both above State HWY 35, and below the Powell Falls Dam, however, the stretch of the Kinni through the City of River Falls is not included in this designation where the river is impounded into two reservoirs which do not support a fishery. This ORW designation indicates the Kinni provides outstanding recreational opportunities, supports valuable fisheries and wildlife habitat, has good water quality, and is not significantly impacted by human activities. This designation indicates that the State of Wisconsin has determined the Kinnickinnic River warrants additional protection from the effects of pollution. These designations are intended to meet federal Clean Water Act obligations requiring Wisconsin to adopt an “antidegradation” policy that is designed to prevent any lowering of water quality – especially in those waters having significant ecological or cultural value.

Local stakeholder organizations in the FERC relicensing process include the Friends of the Kinni, the Kiap-TU-Wish Chapter of Trout Unlimited, the Kinnickinnic River Land Trust, and the River Alliance of Wisconsin. Government agencies also serving as stakeholder organizations include the Wisconsin DNR, the US Fish and Wildlife Service, and the National Park Service.

== Completed removals by dam height ==
This list includes all known removals of dams greater than or equal to 65 feet (20 m) in height.

Rank	Dam	Height	Year removed	Location	Watercourse	Watershed
1	Glines Canyon Dam	210 ft (64 m)	2011	Port Angeles, WA; 48.0022°N 123.6°W	Elwha River	Elwha River
2	Dominion Virginia City Dam No. 1	180 ft (55 m)		St. Paul, VA; 36.9269°N 82.3433°W	Meade Creek	Tennessee River
3	Iron Gate Dam (California)	173 ft (53 m)	2024	Siskiyou County, CA; 41°56′02″N 122°26′07″W	Klamath River	Klamath River
4	Occidental Chem Pond Dam D	160 ft (49 m)	1995	Williamsport, TN; 35.7061°N 87.225°W	Duck Creek	Tennessee River
5	Cucharas #5 Dam	135 ft (41 m)	2019	Huerfano County, CO; 37.75°N 104.6°W	Cucharas River	Arkansas River
6	Copco Number 1 Dam	132 ft (40 m)	2024	Siskiyou County, CA; 41.9800°N 122.3370°W	Klamath River	Klamath River
7	Condit Dam	125 ft (38 m)	2011	Klickitat County and Skamania County, WA; 45.7674°N 121.538°W	White Salmon River	Columbia River
8	Elwha Dam	108 ft (33 m)	2011	Port Angeles, WA; 48.0941°N 123.558°W	Elwha River	Elwha River
9	San Clemente Dam	106 ft (32 m)	2015	Monterey County, CA; 36.4359°N 121.7088°W	Carmel River	Carmel River
9	London's Mill Dam (Tailings Pond Dam)	106 ft (32 m)	1995	Polk County, TN; 35.0424°N 84.3665°W	Burra Burra Creek	Tennessee River
11	Atlas Mineral Dam	93 ft (28 m)	1994	Moab, UT; 38.6°N 109.595°W	Tributary to Colorado River	Colorado River
12	Two Mile Dam	85 ft (26 m)	1994	Santa Fe, NM; 35.6865°N 105.895°W	Santa Fe River	Rio Grande
13	Gunter Valley Dam	83 ft (25 m)	2019	Franklin County, PA; 40.1376°N 77.6722°W	Trout Run	Susquehanna River
14	Elk Creek Dam	80 ft (24 m)	2008	Jackson County, OR; 42.6793°N 122.7379°W	Elk Creek	Rogue River
15	Monsanto Dam Number 7	78 ft (24 m)	1990	Columbia, TN; 35.6549°N 87.0923°W	Duck River	Tennessee River
16	Conservation Pond No. 2 Dam (Jockey Hollow No. 2 Dam)	73 ft (22 m)	2017	Harrison, OH; 40.1897°N 81.1172°W	Tributary to Boggs Fork Stillwater Creek	Ohio River
17	Lower Eklutna River Dam	70 ft (21 m)	2017	Anchorage, AK; 61.4494°N 149.3239°W	Eklutna River	Cook Inlet
17	Air Force Dam (Silver Lead Creek Dam)	70 ft (21 m)	1998	Gwinn, MI; 46.343°N 87.3641°W	Silver Lead Creek	Chocolay River
19	Lake Bluestem Dam	68 ft (21 m)	1980s	Butler County, KS; 37.8501°N 96.7777°W	Bemis Creek	Arkansas River
19	John C. Boyle Dam	68 ft (21 m)	2024	Klamath County, OR; 42.1234°N 122.0483°W	Klamath River	Klamath River
21	Mike Horse Dam	65 ft (20 m)	2015	Lewis and Clark County, MT; 47.0281°N 112.3539°W	Beartrap Creek	Columbia River
21	Hunter Dam	65 ft (20 m)		Hunters, WA; 48.1229°N 118.158°W	Hunter Creek	Columbia River
21	Bald Knob Dam	65 ft (20 m)	2016	Findlay Township, PA; 40.4544°N 80.3155°W	Potato Garden Run	Ohio River
21	McMillan Dam	65 ft (20 m)	1991	Artesia, NM; 32.5972°N 104.3507°W	Pecos River	Rio Grande

== Planned and proposed removals ==
Planned removals
Dam	Height	Expected year	Location	Watercourse	Watershed
Matilija Dam	198 ft (60 m)		Ojai, CA; 34.49°N 119.31°W	Matilija Creek	Ventura River
Rindge Dam	100 ft (30 m)	2025–2035	Malibu Creek State Park, CA; 34.0646°N 118.699°W	Malibu Creek	Santa Monica Bay

Proposed removals
Dam	Height	Location	Watercourse	Watershed
Glen Canyon Dam	710 ft (220 m)	Coconino County, AZ; 36.9375°N 111.4844°W	Colorado River	Colorado River
O'Shaughnessy Dam	430 ft (130 m)	Yosemite National Park, CA; 37.9475°N 119.7883°W	Tuolumne River	San Joaquin River
Ice Harbor Dam	213 ft (65 m)	Franklin County and Walla Walla County, WA; 46.2496°N 118.88°W	Snake River	Columbia River
Lower Monumental Dam	152 ft (46 m)	Franklin County and Walla Walla County, WA; 46.5624°N 118.537°W	Snake River	Columbia River
Little Goose Dam	253 ft (77 m)	Columbia County and Whitman County, WA; 46.5875°N 118.0261°W	Snake River	Columbia River
Lower Granite Dam	181 ft (55 m)	Garfield County and Whitman County, WA; 46.6605°N 117.4283°W	Snake River	Columbia River

== By state or territory ==
=== Ohio ===
Dam	Dam height	Watercourse	Removal completed	Notes
Pinery Feeder Dam		Cuyahoga River	2020	
Brecksville Dam	8 ft (2.4 m)	Cuyahoga River	2020	

=== Oregon ===
Dam	Dam height	Watercourse	Removal completed	Notes
Marie Dorian Dam	8 ft (2.4 m)	Walla Walla River	1997	The dam blocked passage to Pacific Salmon and steelhead into the Blue Mountains from the Columbia Basin.

=== Wisconsin ===
==== Completed removals ====
Dam	Watercourse	Removal completed	Notes
Island Woolen Mill Dam	Baraboo River	1972	Opened 120 miles (190 km) of a Wisconsin River tributary to fish and wildlife.
Reedsburg Woolen Mills Dam	Baraboo River	1973	Opened 120 miles (190 km) of a Wisconsin River tributary to fish and wildlife.
Wonewoc Dam	Baraboo River	1996	Opened 120 miles (190 km) of a Wisconsin River tributary to fish and wildlife.
Waterworks Dam	Baraboo River	1998	Opened 120 miles (190 km) of a Wisconsin River tributary to fish and wildlife.
Oak Street Dam	Baraboo River	2000	Opened 120 miles (190 km) of a Wisconsin River tributary to fish and wildlife.
LaValle Dam	Baraboo River	2001	Opened 120 miles (190 km) of a Wisconsin River tributary to fish and wildlife.
Linen Mill Dam	Baraboo River	2001	Opened 120 miles (190 km) of a Wisconsin River tributary to fish and wildlife.

==== Planned removals ====
Dam	River	Removal timeframe	Notes
Junction Falls Dam	Kinnickinnic River	2023–2040	In 2018, River Falls, Wisconsin, approved the removal of two little-used dams in the city. This would return the Kinnickinnic River to a free-flowing state and restore the city's namesake falls.
Powell Dam	Kinnickinnic River	2025–2040	In 2018, River Falls, Wisconsin, approved the removal of two little-used dams in the city. This would return the Kinnickinnic River to a free-flowing state and restore the city's namesake falls.
