= Pacific Northwest Waterways Association =

Pacific Northwest Waterways Association, also known as PNWA, is a collaboration of ports, businesses, public agencies and individuals who combine their economic and political strength in support of navigation, trade and economic development throughout the Pacific Northwest.

== History ==
In 1934 PNWA was founded by the Chamber of Commerce in Walla Walla, Washington with the name Inland Empire Waterways Association (IEWA). Founder Herbert G. West formed the association to champion his vision of navigation on the Columbia and Snake Rivers from Astoria to Lewiston, ID. West worked to build the IEWA membership, as well as to build their political foundation among regional and national lawmakers. He was appointed to President Franklin Roosevelt’s Natural Resources Committee, to the Water Resources Committee of the Northwest Regional Planning Commission, and worked to build relationships with the United States Army Corps of Engineers, the federal agency in charge of maintaining navigation.

IEWA's first act was to petition Roosevelt and the United States Congress for funds to secure a navigation lock at Bonneville Dam. IEWA then led the way for Congressional authorization and funding to complete the construction of the remaining seven locks and dams. Construction was completed in the following order: Grand Coulee Dam in 1941, McNary Dam in 1953, The Dalles Dam in 1957, Ice Harbor Dam in 1961, John Day Dam in 1968, Lower Monumental Dam in 1969, Lower Granite Dam in 1975, and Little Goose Dam in 1978.

In 1971, IEWA merged with a Coastal and Puget Sound Ports and Harbors Association to become Pacific Northwest Waterways Association (PNWA) and to provide a comprehensive regional perspective. Since then, membership has grown to include public ports, tug and barge companies, steamship operators, grain elevator operators, agricultural producers, forest products manufacturers, electric utilities, irrigation districts, other businesses, public agencies, and individuals from Alaska, Washington, Oregon, Idaho and Northern California. PNWA continues to be the region's lead advocate for infrastructure development and maintenance, environmental issues, public policy, and appropriations supporting regional navigation, transportation, trade, energy, and economic development interests.
