= Hunters Creek =

Hunters Creek or Hunter Creek may refer to a location in the United States:

- Hunter Creek, Arizona, a census-designated place in Gila County
- Hunter's Creek, Florida, a census-designated place in Orange County
- Hunters Creek, Michigan, an unincorporated community
- Hunters Creek Village, Texas, a city in Harris County
- Hunter Creek (Bryant Creek), a stream in Missouri
- Hunter Creek (St. Francis River), a stream in Missouri
- Hunter Creek (Columbia River), a stream in Washington
- Sgt. Mark A. Rademacher Memorial Park, commonly known as "Hunters Creek Park", in Erie County, New York
