= List of dams in the Columbia River watershed =

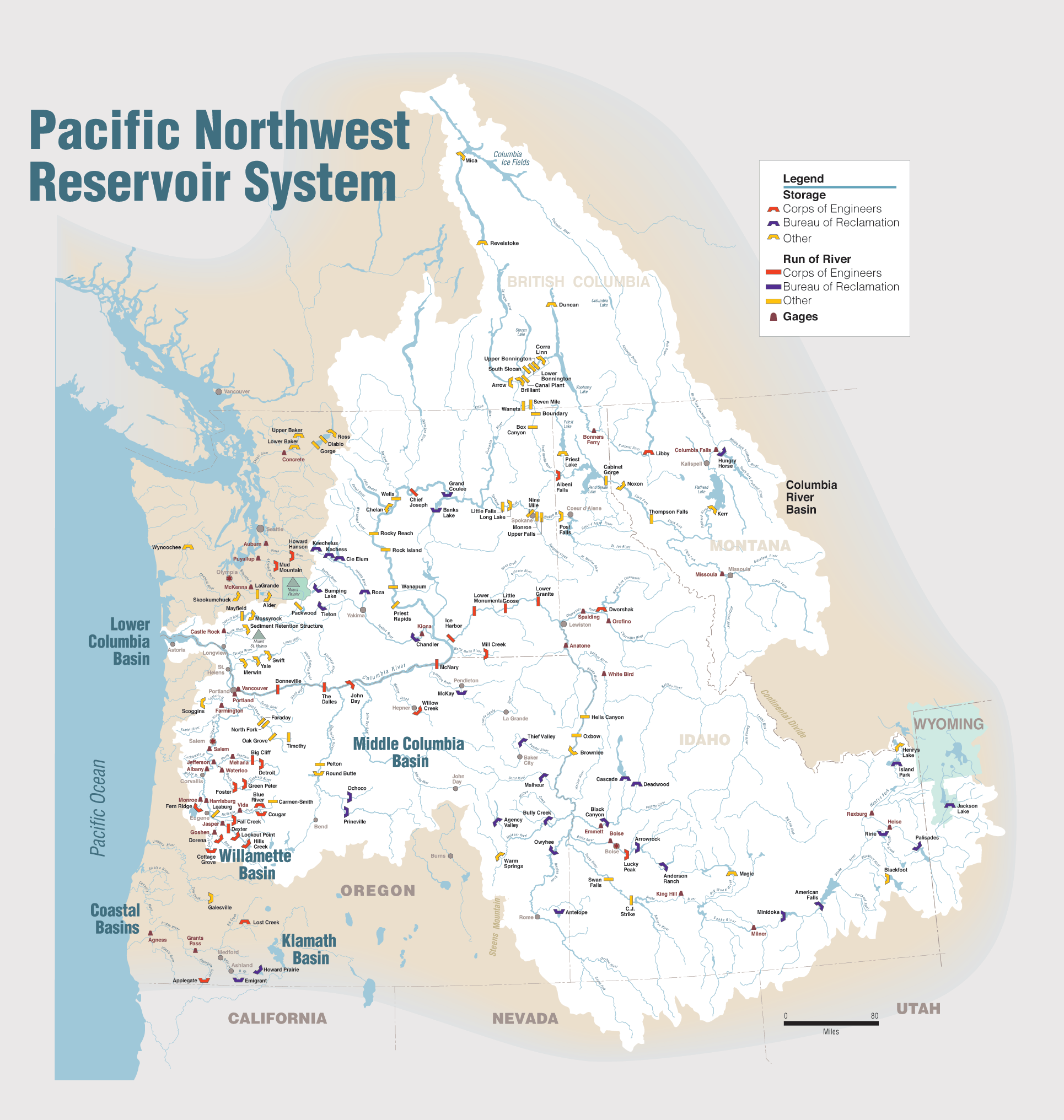
Dams of the Columbia River Basin. Click to view higher resolution and read legend.

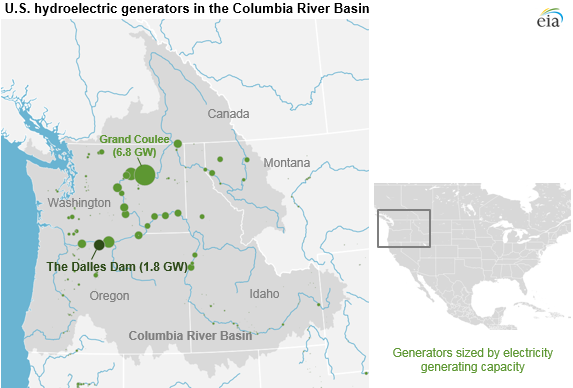
Hydroelectric generators in the basin sized by capacity. 17 dams on the British Columbia side of Canada-US border not shown.

There are more than 60 dams in the Columbia River watershed in the United States and Canada. Tributaries of the Columbia River and their dammed tributaries, as well as the main stem itself, each have their own list below. The dams are listed in the order as they are found from source to terminus. Many of the dams in the Columbia River watershed were not created for the specific purposes of water storage or flood protection. Instead, the primary purpose of many of these dams is to produce hydroelectricity. As can be seen in the lists, these dams provide many tens of gigawatts of power.

Major dam construction began in the early 20th century and picked up the pace after the Columbia River Treaty in the 1960s, by the mid-1980s all the big dams were finished. Including just the dams listed below, there are 169 dams in the watershed, with 14 on the Columbia, 20 on the Snake, seven on the Kootenay, seven on the Pend Oreille / Clark, two on the Flathead, eight on the Yakima, and two on the Owyhee. Averaging a major dam every 72 miles (116 km), the rivers in the Columbia watershed combine to generate over 36,000 megawatts of power, with the majority coming on the main stem. Grand Coulee Dam is the largest producer of hydroelectric power in the United States, generating 6,809 megawatts, over one-sixth of all power in the basin.

In addition to providing ample power for the people of the Pacific Northwest, the reservoirs created by the dams have created numerous recreational opportunities, including fishing, boating, and windsurfing. Furthermore, by creating a constant flow and consistent depth along the river channel, the series of locks and dams have allowed for Lewiston, Idaho, to become the furthest inland seaport on the west coast of the United States. Despite the numerous benefits to humans that the dams have provided, a number of environmental consequences have manifested as a result of the dams, including a negative impact on salmonid populations of the basin.

The organization of the following lists begins with the Columbia River dams and is followed by dams on its tributaries (in order of length) and their respective watersheds. Additionally, the table of contents below is indented to indicate tributary status of each river.

== Main stem Columbia River dams ==
Dams are listed in order from headwater (Columbia Lake, BC) to mouth (Pacific Ocean, OR/WA).

Name	Height	Capacity (MW)	Province/State(s)	Coordinates	Year of completion	Owner	Reservoir formed	Image
Mica Dam	240 m (790 ft)	2,805	British Columbia	52°04′39″N 118°33′59″W	1973	BC Hydro	Kinbasket Lake	
Revelstoke Dam	175 m (574 ft)	2,480	British Columbia	51°02′57″N 118°11′36″W	1984	BC Hydro	Revelstoke Lake	
Keenleyside Dam	52 m (171 ft)	185	British Columbia	49°20′18″N 117°46′18″W	1968	BC Hydro	Raised Arrow Lakes	
Grand Coulee Dam	550 ft (170 m)	6,809	Washington	47°57′26″N 118°58′39″W	1941 / 1974 (Note: Dam was initially completed in 1941; third power plant was begun in 1967 and completed in 1974.)	USBR	Franklin D. Roosevelt Lake	
Chief Joseph Dam	236 ft (72 m)	2,620	Washington	47°59′42″N 119°38′19″W	1955	USACE	Rufus Woods Lake	
Wells Dam	160 ft (49 m)	840	Washington	47°56′50″N 119°51′51″W	1967	Douglas PUD	Lake Pateros	
Rocky Reach Dam	130 ft (40 m)	1,287	Washington	47°31′59″N 120°17′41″W	1961	Chelan PUD	Lake Entiat	
Rock Island Dam	135 ft (41 m)	660	Washington	47°20′33″N 120°05′40″W	1933	Chelan PUD	Rock Island Pool	
Wanapum Dam	185 ft (56 m)	1,092	Washington	46°52′40″N 119°58′13″W	1963	Grant PUD	Lake Wanapum	
Priest Rapids Dam	178 ft (54 m)	955.6	Washington	46°38′39″N 119°54′36″W	1961	Grant PUD	Priest Rapids Lake	
McNary Dam	183 ft (56 m)	1,133	Washington / Oregon border	45°56′07″N 119°17′53″W	1954	USACE	Lake Wallula	
John Day Dam	184 ft (56 m)	2,485	Washington / Oregon border	45°42′57″N 120°41′37″W	1971	USACE	Lake Umatilla	
The Dalles Dam	260 ft (79 m)	2,038	Washington / Oregon border	45°36′50″N 121°08′02″W	1957	USACE	Lake Celilo	
Bonneville Dam	197 ft (60 m)	1,190	Washington / Oregon border	45°38′42″N 121°56′27″W	1937 / 1981 (Note: Dam was initially completed in 1937; second powerhouse was completed in 1981)	USACE	Lake Bonneville	

=== Snake River dams ===
Dams are listed in order from headwater (Two Oceans Plateau, WY) to mouth Columbia River, WA.

Name	Height	Capacity (MW)	Province/State(s)	Coordinates	Year of completion	Owner	Reservoir formed	Image
Jackson Lake Dam	65.5 ft (20.0 m)	0	Wyoming	43°51′30″N 110°35′24″W	1911 / 1916 / 1989 (Note: The original dam was completed in 1911. In 1917, the dam was raised 17.5 feet (5.3 m) to increase storage. Later, safety concerns were addressed and the new, modified dam was completed in 1989.)	USBR	Jackson Lake	
Palisades Dam	270 ft (82 m)	176.6	Idaho	43°19′59″N 111°12′12″W	1957	USBR	Palisades Reservoir	
Gem State Dam	40 ft (12 m)	22.6	Idaho	43°25′19″N 112°06′08″W	1982	City of Idaho Falls		
American Falls Dam	104 ft (32 m)	112.4	Idaho	42°46′43″N 112°52′35″W	1927 / 1978 (Note: Original dam was completed in 1927. Due to deterioration, a replacement dam was commissioned and completed in 1978.)	USBR	American Falls Reservoir	
Minidoka Dam	86 ft (26 m)	28.5	Idaho	42°40′10″N 113°29′03″W	1909-1942	USBR	Lake Walcott	
Milner Dam	38 ft (12 m)	59.5	Idaho	42°31′30″N 114°00′35″W	1905	Milner Dam, Inc.	Milner Lake	
Twin Falls Dam	25 ft (7.6 m) (Note: Information received in email exchange with representative from Idaho Power.)	52.9	Idaho	42°35′21″N 114°21′20″W	1935 / 1995 (Note: Initially completed in 1935, updated in 1995 with diversion structure and two powerhouses)	Idaho Power Company	Twin Falls Reservoir	
Shoshone Falls Dam	16 ft (4.9 m)	64	Idaho	42°35′47″N 114°24′04″W	1907	Idaho Power Company	Shoshone Falls Reservoir	
Upper Salmon Falls Dam	18 ft (5.5 m)	34.5	Idaho	42°45′59″N 114°53′45″W	1937 / 1947 (Note: Constructed with two power plants - A & B. Upper Salmon A was completed in 1937, Upper Salmon B, located a mile upriver from A, was completed in 1947.)	Idaho Power Company	Upper Salmon Falls Reservoir	
Lower Salmon Falls Dam	38 ft (12 m)	60	Idaho	42°50′30″N 114°54′54″W	1910 / 1949 (Note: Initially constructed by Greater Shoshone and Twin Falls Water Power Company in 1910, bought by Idaho Power in 1916 and updated in 1949.)	Idaho Power Company	Lower Salmon Falls Reservoir	
Bliss Dam	84 ft (26 m)	75	Idaho	42°54′49″N 115°04′16″W	1950	Idaho Power Company	Bliss Reservoir	
C. J. Strike Dam	115 ft (35 m)	82.8	Idaho	42°56′51″N 115°58′31″W	1952	Idaho Power Company	C. J. Strike Reservoir	
Swan Falls Dam	107 ft (33 m)	25 (Note: A new power plant was built in the 1990s; this one was decommissioned and turned into a historical display)	Idaho	43°14′35″N 116°22′46″W	1901	Idaho Power Company	Swan Falls Reservoir	
Brownlee Dam	420 ft (130 m)	585	Idaho / Oregon border	44°50′13″N 116°54′03″W	1959 / 1980 (Note: Dam and units one to four completed in 1959, unit five completed in 1980.)	Idaho Power Company	Brownlee Reservoir	
Oxbow Dam	175 ft (53 m)	220	Idaho / Oregon border	44°58′15″N 116°50′07″W	1961	Idaho Power Company	Oxbow Reservoir	
Hells Canyon Dam	330 ft (100 m)	450	Idaho / Oregon border	45°14′34″N 116°42′05″W	1967	Idaho Power Company	Hells Canyon Reservoir	
Lower Granite Dam	181 ft (55 m)	932	Washington	46°39′40″N 117°25′41″W	1975 / 1987 (Note: Dam and first three powerhouses were completed in 1975. Three further powerhouses, as well as modifications to Lewiston's water intake, were completed in 1987.)	USACE	Lower Granite Lake	
Little Goose Dam	253 ft (77 m)	932	Washington	46°35′13″N 118°01′40″W	1970	USACE	Lake Bryan	
Lower Monumental Dam	152 ft (46 m)	930	Washington	46°33′48″N 118°32′20″W	1969	USACE	Lake Herbert G. West	
Ice Harbor Dam	213 ft (65 m)	693	Washington	46°14′58″N 118°52′47″W	1961 / 1976 (Note: Dam was initially completed in 1961 with three generators online. Powerhouse units four through six were later added and online in 1976.)	USACE	Lake Sacajawea	

==== Salmon River dams ====
===== Little Salmon River dams =====
Dams are listed in order from headwater (north West Mountain, ID) to mouth (Salmon River, ID)

Name	Height	Capacity (MW)	Province/State(s)	Coordinates	Year of completion	Owner	Reservoir formed	Image
Goose Lake Dam (Goose Creek)	26 ft (7.9 m)	0	Idaho	45°04′13″N 116°10′09″W	1924	Ca Campbell Company	Goose Lake	
Brundage Dam (Brundage Creek(Goose Creek))	64 ft (20 m)	0	Idaho	45°02′30″N 116°07′53″W	1989	Brundage Reservoir Company	Brundage Reservoir	

==== Owyhee River dams ====
Dams are listed in order from headwater (near Double Mountain, NV) to mouth (Snake River, OR/ID)

Name	Height	Capacity (MW)	Province/State(s)	Coordinates	Year of completion	Owner	Reservoir formed	Image
Wild Horse Dam	114 ft (35 m)	0	Nevada	41°41′14″N 115°50′43″W	1937 / 1969 (Note: The first Wild Horse Dam was constructed in 1937. After the aggregate was found to be of poor quality, a new concrete, thin arch dam was completed in 1969, doubling the size of the reservoir.)	BIA	Wild Horse Reservoir	
Antelope Reservoir Dam (Antelope Creek (Jordan Creek))	60 ft (18 m)	0	Oregon	42°54′0″N 117°13′48″W	1923	Jordan Valley Irrigation District	Antelope Reservoir	
Owyhee Dam	417 ft (127 m)	5 (Note: Power plant located at Owyhee Dam.),8 (Note: Power plant located along the Owyhee Tunnel No. 1.),2 (Note: Power plant located along the Mitchell Butte Lateral.)	Oregon	43°38′31″N 117°14′33″W	1932	USBR	Lake Owyhee	

===== South Fork Owyhee River dams =====
Dams are listed in order from headwater (north Tuscarora Mountains, NV) to mouth (Owyhee River, ID)

Name	Height	Capacity (MW)	Province/State(s)	Coordinates	Year of completion	Owner	Reservoir formed	Image
Wilson Reservoir Dam (Wilson Creek)	34 ft (10 m)	0	Nevada	41°40′12″N 116°20′24″W		Petan Company	Wilson Reservoir	
Bull Run Dam (Bull Run Creek)	69 ft (21 m)	0	Nevada	41°38′24″N 116°09′0″W		Petan Company	Bull Run Reservoir	
Dry Creek Dam (Indian Creek)	70 ft (21 m)	0	Nevada	41°47′24″N 116°13′48″W		Petan Company	Dry Creek Reservoir	
Rawhide Reservoir Dam (Indian Creek)	33 ft (10 m)	0	Nevada	41°42′36″N 116°20′24″W		Petan Company	Rawhide Reservoir	
Sheep Creek Dam (Sheep Creek)	29 ft (8.8 m)	0	Nevada	41°51′36″N 116°16′12″W	1966	United States Bureau of Indian Affairs, Shoshone and Paiute Tribes	Sheep Creek Reservoir	
Chimney Creek Dam (Fourmile Creek)	20 ft (6.1 m)	0	Nevada	41°42′36″N 116°32′24″W		Roaring Springs Associates	Desert Ranch Reservoir	

==== Malheur River dams ====
Dams are listed in order from headwater (Logan Valley, OR) to mouth (Snake River, OR/ID)

Name	Height	Capacity (MW)	Province/State(s)	Coordinates	Year of completion	Owner	Reservoir formed	Image
Warm Springs Dam	106 ft (32 m)	proposed 2.7	Oregon	43°35′07″N 118°12′31″W	1919	United States Bureau of Reclamation	Warm Springs Reservoir	
Agency Valley Dam (North Fork Malheur River)	110 ft (34 m)	proposed 2.0	Oregon	43°54′41″N 118°09′15″W	1935	United States Bureau of Reclamation	Beulah Reservoir	
Harper Diversion Dam	12 ft (3.7 m)	0	Oregon	43°49′29″N 117°38′32″W	1930	United States Bureau of Reclamation	Harper Diversion Pool	
Bully Creek Dam (Bully Creek)	121 ft (37 m)	0	Oregon	44°00′55″N 117°23′48″W	1963	United States Bureau of Reclamation	Bully Creek Reservoir	
Bully Creek Diversion Dam (Bully Creek)	4 ft (1.2 m)	0	Oregon	44°00′11″N 117°23′03″W	1964	United States Bureau of Reclamation	Bully Creek Diversion Pool	
Willow Creek Reservoir #3 Dam (Willow Creek)	110 ft (34 m)	0	Oregon	44°21′11″N 117°40′16″W	1944	Orchard Water Company	Malheur Reservoir	

==== Grande Ronde River dams ====
===== Wallowa River dams =====
Dams are listed in order from headwater (near Pete's Point, Eagle Cap Wilderness, OR) to mouth (Grande Ronde River, OR)

Name	Height	Capacity (MW)	Province/State(s)	Coordinates	Year of completion	Owner	Reservoir formed	Image
Wallowa Lake Dam	40 ft (12 m)	0	Oregon	45°19′48″N 117°13′12″W	1931	Associated Ditch Companies	Raised Wallowa Lake	

==== Powder River dams ====
Dams are listed in order from headwater (confluence of McCully Fork and Cracker Creek, OR) to mouth (Snake River, OR/ID)

Name	Height	Capacity (MW)	Province/State(s)	Coordinates	Year of completion	Owner	Reservoir formed	Image
Mason Dam	173 ft (53 m)	proposed 3.4	Oregon	44°40′12″N 117°59′24″W	1968	United States Bureau of Reclamation	Philips Lake	
Thief Valley Dam	73 ft (22 m)	0	Oregon	45°0′36″N 117°46′12″W	1932	United States Bureau of Reclamation	Thief Valley Reservoir	

==== Blackfoot River dams ====
Dams are listed in order from headwater (confluence of Diamond and Lanes Creeks, ID) to mouth (Snake River, ID)

Name	Height	Capacity (MW)	Province/State(s)	Coordinates	Year of completion	Owner	Reservoir formed	Image
Blackfoot Dam	44 ft (13 m)	0	Idaho	43°0′0″N 111°42′36″W	1911	United States Bureau of Indian Affairs	Blackfoot Reservoir	

==== Henrys Fork dams ====
Dams are listed in order from headwater (Henrys Lake, ID) to mouth (Snake River, ID)

Name	Height	Capacity (MW)	Province/State(s)	Coordinates	Year of completion	Owner	Reservoir formed	Image
Henrys Lake Dam	18 ft (5.5 m)	0	Idaho	44°35′24″N 111°21′0″W	1923	North Fork Reservoir Company	Raised Henrys Lake	
Island Park Dam	94 ft (29 m)	4.8	Idaho	44°25′12″N 111°23′24″W	1938	United States Bureau of Reclamation	Island Park Reservoir	
Buffalo River Dam (Buffalo River)	12 ft (3.7 m)	0.25	Idaho	44°24′52″N 111°23′34″W	1980	Fall River Rural Electric Cooperative, Inc.	Buffalo Dam Pool	
Ashton Dam	56.6 ft (17.3 m)	6.85	Idaho	44°04′12″N 111°29′24″W	1913	PacifiCorp	Ashton Dam Lake	
Chester Dam (Crosscut Diversion Dam)	14.5 ft (4.4 m)	3.3	Idaho	44°0′36″N 111°34′48″W	1938	Fremont-Madison Irrigation District	Chester Dam Pool	

===== Fall River dams =====
Dams are listed in order from headwater (Pitchstone Plateau, WY) to mouth (Henrys Fork, ID)

Name	Height	Capacity (MW)	Province/State(s)	Coordinates	Year of completion	Owner	Reservoir formed	Image
Grassy Lake Dam (Grassy Creek)	118 ft (36 m)	0	Wyoming	44°07′48″N 110°48′36″W	1939	United States Bureau of Reclamation	Grassy Lake	

==== Portneuf River dams ====
Dams are listed in order from headwater (southeast of Higham Peak, ID) to mouth (Snake River, ID)

Name	Height	Capacity (MW)	Province/State(s)	Coordinates	Year of completion	Owner	Reservoir formed	Image
Portneuf Dam	47 ft (14 m)	0	Idaho	42°52′12″N 111°56′24″W	1912	Portneuf-Marsh Valley Canal Company	Chesterfield Reservoir	

==== Salmon Falls Creek dams ====
Dams are listed in order from headwater (Jarbidge Mountains, NV) to mouth (Snake River, ID)

Name	Height	Capacity (MW)	Province/State(s)	Coordinates	Year of completion	Owner	Reservoir formed	Image
Salmon Falls Dam	217 ft (66 m)	0	Idaho	42°12′36″N 114°43′48″W	1911	Salmon River Canal Company, Ltd.	Salmon Falls Creek Reservoir	
Cedar Creek Dam (Cedar Creek)	84 ft (26 m)	0	Idaho	42°13′12″N 114°52′12″W	1920	Cedar Mesa Reservoir And Canal Company	Cedar Creek Reservoir	

==== Boise River dams ====
Dams are listed in order from headwater (confluence of North and Middle Forks Boise River, ID) to mouth (Snake River, ID/OR)

Name	Height	Capacity (MW)	Province/State(s)	Coordinates	Year of completion	Owner	Reservoir formed	Image
Arrowrock Dam	350 ft (110 m)	15	Idaho	43°36′0″N 115°55′12″W	1915	United States Bureau of Reclamation	Arrowrock Reservoir	
Lucky Peak Dam	340 ft (100 m)	101.25	Idaho	43°31′12″N 116°03′0″W	1955	United States Army Corps of Engineers	Lucky Peak Lake	
Boise River Diversion Dam	68 ft (21 m)	3.3	Idaho	43°31′48″N 116°05′24″W	1908	United States Bureau of Reclamation	Boise River Diversion Dam Pool	
Barber Dam	25 ft (7.6 m)	4.14	Idaho	43°34′12″N 116°07′12″W	1904	Ada County and Fulcrum Inc.	Barber Dam Pool	

===== South Fork Boise River dams =====
Dams are listed in order from headwater (confluence of Ross Fork and Johnson Creek, ID) to mouth (Boise River, ID)

Name	Height	Capacity (MW)	Province/State(s)	Coordinates	Year of completion	Owner	Reservoir formed	Image
Anderson Ranch Dam	456 ft (139 m)	40	Idaho	43°21′36″N 115°26′24″W	1947	United States Bureau of Reclamation	Anderson Ranch Reservoir	
Little Camas Dam (Little Camas Creek)	44 ft (13 m)	0	Idaho	43°21′0″N 115°22′48″W	1912	Mountain Home Irrigation District	Little Camas Reservoir	

==== Goose Creek dams ====
Dams are listed in order from headwater (near Monument Peak, ID) to mouth (Snake River, ID)

Name	Height	Capacity (MW)	Province/State(s)	Coordinates	Year of completion	Owner	Reservoir formed	Image
Oakley Dam	139 ft (42 m)	0	Idaho	42°11′24″N 113°54′36″W	1916	Oakley Canal Company	Lower Goose Creek Reservoir	

==== Weiser River dams ====
Dams are listed in order from headwater (near Brush Mountain, ID) to mouth (Snake River, ID/OR)

Name	Height	Capacity (MW)	Province/State(s)	Coordinates	Year of completion	Owner	Reservoir formed	Image
Lost Valley Dam (Lost Creek(West Fork Weiser River))	52 ft (16 m)	0	Idaho	44°57′23″N 116°28′02″W	1929	Lost Valley Reservoir Company	Lost Valley Reservoir	
C Ben Ross Dam (Little Weiser River)	56 ft (17 m)	0	Idaho	44°31′12″N 116°26′24″W	1937	Little Weiser River Irrigation District	Ben Ross Reservoir	
Crane Creek Dam (Crane Creek)	55 ft (17 m)	0	Idaho	44°21′0″N 116°36′36″W	1912	Crane Creek Reservoir Administration Board	Crane Creek Reservoir	
Mann Creek Dam (Mann Creek)	148 ft (45 m)	0	Idaho	44°23′24″N 116°53′24″W	1967	United States Bureau of Reclamation	Mann Creek Reservoir	

==== Burnt River dams ====
Dams are listed in order from headwater (confluence of North and South Fork Burnt Rivers, OR) to mouth (Snake River, OR/ID)

Name	Height	Capacity (MW)	Province/State(s)	Coordinates	Year of completion	Owner	Reservoir formed	Image
Unity Dam	82 ft (25 m)	proposed 0.8	Oregon	43°30′0″N 118°10′48″W	1938	United States Bureau of Reclamation	Unity Reservoir	

==== Willow Creek dams ====
Dams are listed in order from headwater (Blackfoot Mountains, ID) to mouth (Snake River, ID)

Name	Height	Capacity (MW)	Province/State(s)	Coordinates	Year of completion	Owner	Reservoir formed	Image
Ririe Dam	253 ft (77 m)	0	Idaho	43°34′48″N 111°44′24″W	1977	United States Bureau of Reclamation	Ririe Reservoir	

==== Payette River dams ====
Dams are listed in order from headwater (confluence of South and Middle Forks Payette River, ID) to mouth (Snake River, ID/OR)

Name	Height	Capacity (MW)	Province/State(s)	Coordinates	Year of completion	Owner	Reservoir formed	Image
Black Canyon Diversion Dam	183 ft (56 m)	10.2	Idaho	43°52′48″N 116°28′48″W	1924	United States Bureau of Reclamation	Black Canyon Reservoir	

===== North Fork Payette River dams =====
Dams are listed in order from headwater (Squaw Meadows, ID) to mouth (Payette River, ID)

Name	Height	Capacity (MW)	Province/State(s)	Coordinates	Year of completion	Owner	Reservoir formed	Image
Upper Payette Lake Dam	18 ft (5.5 m)	0	Idaho	45°06′40″N 116°01′35″W	1952	Lake Reservoir Company	Upper Payette Lake	
Granite Lake Dam (Fisher Creek)	28 ft (8.5 m)	0	Idaho	45°06′02″N 116°04′51″W	1963	Lake Reservoir Company	Granite Lake	
Payette Lake Dam	8.2 ft (2.5 m)	0	Idaho	44°54′36″N 116°06′36″W	1943	Lake Reservoir Company	Raised Payette Lake	
Little Payette Lake Dam (Lake Fork)	15.8 ft (4.8 m)	0	Idaho	44°54′0″N 116°02′24″W	1926	Lake Fork Irrigation District	Little Payette Lake	
Cascade Dam	107 ft (33 m)	12.8	Idaho	44°31′12″N 116°03′0″W	1948	United States Bureau of Reclamation	Lake Cascade	
Sage Hen Dam(Sage Hen Creek(Second Fork Squaw Creek))	38 ft (12 m)	0	Idaho	44°19′12″N 116°11′24″W	1938	Squaw Creek Irrigation Company	Sage Hen Reservoir	
Paddock Valley Dam (Little Willow Creek)	43 ft (13 m)	0	Idaho	44°11′24″N 116°35′24″W	1949	Little Willow Irrigation District	Paddock Valley Reservoir	

===== South Fork Payette River dams =====
Dams are listed in order from headwater (near Vernon Lake, ID) to mouth (Payette River, ID)

Name	Height	Capacity (MW)	Province/State(s)	Coordinates	Year of completion	Owner	Reservoir formed	Image
Deadwood Dam (Deadwood River)	183 ft (56 m)	0	Idaho	44°17′24″N 115°38′24″W	1931	United States Bureau of Reclamation	Deadwood Reservoir	

==== Clearwater River dams ====
===== North Fork Clearwater River dams =====
Dams are listed in order from headwater (near Illinois Peak, ID/MT) to mouth (Clearwater River, ID)

Name	Height	Capacity (MW)	Province/State(s)	Coordinates	Year of completion	Owner	Reservoir formed	Image
Dworshak Dam	717 ft (219 m)	400	Idaho	46°30′N 116°18′W	1973	Army Corps of Engineers	Dworshak Reservoir	

==== Malad River dams ====
Name	Height	Capacity (MW)	Province/State(s)	Coordinates	Year of completion	Owner	Reservoir formed	Image
Upper Malad River Dam	124.1 ft (37.8 m)	8.27	Idaho	42°51′55″N 114°52′09″W	1948	Idaho Power Company	Malad Gorge State Park	
Lower Malad River Dam	152.0 ft (46.3 m)	13.50	Idaho	42°51′51″N 114°53′08″W	1911	Idaho Power Company	Malad Gorge State Park	

===== Big Wood River dams =====
Dams are listed in order from headwater (near Galena Summit, ID) to mouth (Malad River, ID)

Name	Height	Capacity (MW)	Province/State(s)	Coordinates	Year of completion	Owner	Reservoir formed	Image
Magic Dam	128 ft (39 m)	9	Idaho	43°15′0″N 114°22′12″W	1910	Magic Reservoir Hydroelectric, Inc.	Magic Reservoir	

====== Camas Creek ======
Dams are listed in order from headwater (near Packer Butte, ID) to mouth (Big Wood River, ID)

Name	Height	Capacity (MW)	Province/State(s)	Coordinates	Year of completion	Owner	Reservoir formed	Image
Mormon Dam (McKinney Creek)	23 ft (7.0 m)	0	Idaho	43°16′48″N 114°48′0″W	1908	Twin Lakes Reservoir and Irrigation Company	Mormon Reservoir	

===== Little Wood River dams =====
Dams are listed in order from headwater (Standhope Peak, ID) to mouth (Malad River, ID)

Name	Height	Capacity (MW)	Province/State(s)	Coordinates	Year of completion	Owner	Reservoir formed	Image
Little Wood River Dam	169 ft (52 m)	3	Idaho	43°25′12″N 114°01′12″W	1962	United States Bureau of Reclamation	Little Wood Reservoir	
Fish Creek Dam (Fish Creek)	88 ft (27 m)	0	Idaho	43°25′12″N 114°49′48″W	1923	Carey Valley Reservoir Company	Fish Creek Reservoir	

=== Kootenay River dams ===
Dams are listed in order from headwater (near Castle Mountain, Beaverfoot Range, BC) to mouth (Columbia River, BC).

Name	Height	Capacity (MW)	Province/State(s)	Coordinates	Year of completion	Owner	Reservoir formed	Image
Libby Dam	420 ft (130 m)	604	Montana	48°24′37″N 115°18′52″W	1972	USACE	Lake Koocanusa	
Corra Linn Dam	16 m (52 ft)	51	British Columbia	49°28′04″N 117°28′02″W	1932	FortisBC	raised Kootenay Lake	
Upper Bonnington Falls Dam	21 m (69 ft)	53	British Columbia	49°27′35″N 117°29′03″W	1907	FortisBC		
Lower Bonnington Falls Dam	21 m (69 ft)	25	British Columbia	49°27′39″N 117°29′59″W	1925	FortisBC		
South Slocan Dam	18 m (59 ft)	57	British Columbia	49°27′20″N 117°31′11″W	1928	FortisBC		
Kootenay Canal Generating Station (Note: Kootenay Canal Generating Station is located at the end of a canal created by the Corra Linn Dam.)	84 m (276 ft)	583	British Columbia	49°27′10″N 117°31′02″W	1976	BC Hydro		
Brilliant Dam	42.6 m (140 ft)	260 (Note: Original dam constructed in 1944 created 140 MW; expansion completed in 2007 added 120 MW.)	British Columbia	49°19′29″N 117°37′12″W	1944 / 2007	Columbia Power Corporation		

==== Bull River dams ====
Dams are listed in order from headwater (Canadian Rockies) to mouth (Kootenay River, BC).

Name	Height	Capacity (MW)	Province/State(s)	Coordinates	Year of completion	Owner	Reservoir formed	Image
Aberfeldie Dam	90 ft (27 m)	24	British Columbia	49°29′58″N 115°21′3″W	1922 (rebuilt 1953)	BC Hydro	Aberfeldie Dam Pool	

==== Elk River dams ====
Dams are listed in order from headwater (Upper Elk Lake) to mouth (Kootenay River, BC).

Name	Height	Capacity (MW)	Province/State(s)	Coordinates	Year of completion	Owner	Reservoir formed	Image
Elko Dam	52 ft (16 m)	12	British Columbia	49°17′24″N 115°6′16″W	1924	BC Hydro	Elko Dam Pool	

==== Duncan River dams ====
Dams are listed in order from headwater (near Mount Dawson) to mouth (Kootenay River, BC).

Name	Height	Capacity (MW)	Province/State(s)	Coordinates	Year of completion	Owner	Reservoir formed	Image
Duncan Dam	130 ft (40 m)	0	British Columbia	50°15′0″N 116°56′47″W	1967	BC Hydro	raised Duncan Lake	

==== Mark Creek dams ====
Dams are listed in order from headwater (Purcell Mountains) to mouth (Kootenay River, BC).

Name	Height	Capacity (MW)	Province/State(s)	Coordinates	Year of completion	Owner	Reservoir formed	Image
Upper Mark Creek Dam	21.5 m (71 ft)	0	British Columbia	49°42′36″N 116°2′33″W	1994	City of Kimberley	Mark Creek Dam Reservoir	

=== Pend Oreille River / Clark Fork River dams ===
Dams are listed in order from headwater of Clark Fork River (Silver Bow Creek, MT) to mouth of Pend Oreille River (Columbia River, BC). (Note: Although these rivers are not one, for the simplification of this list they will be listed together, as they are only separated by Lake Pend Oreille.)

Name	Height	Capacity (MW)	Province/State(s)	Coordinates	Year of completion	Owner	Reservoir formed	Image
Clark Fork
Thompson Falls Dam	110 ft (34 m) (Note: This dam is made up of four sections with the highest being 110 ft (34 m) and the other three lower sections being 53 ft (16 m), 38 ft (12 m), and 54 ft (16 m).)	94	Montana	47°35′28″N 115°21′03″W	1915	Northwestern Energy	Thompson Falls Reservoir	
Noxon Rapids Dam	260 ft (79 m)	527	Montana	47°57′39″N 115°44′01″W	1959	Avista Corp.	Noxon Reservoir	
Cabinet Gorge Dam	208 ft (63 m)	255	Idaho	48°05′08″N 116°03′27″W	1952	Avista Corp.	Cabinet Gorge Reservoir	
Pend Oreille
Albeni Falls Dam	90 ft (27 m)	42	Idaho	48°10′48″N 116°59′59″W	1955	USACE	Raised Lake Pend Oreille 11.5 ft (3.5 m)	
Box Canyon Dam	62 ft (19 m)	90	Washington	48°46′49″N 117°24′46″W	1956	Pend Oreille PUD	Box Canyon Reservoir	
Boundary Dam	340 ft (100 m)	1,040	Washington	48°59′13″N 117°20′53″W	1967	Seattle City Light	Boundary Lake	
Seven Mile Dam	79.2 m (260 ft)	848	British Columbia	49°01′49″N 117°30′13″W	1979	BC Hydro		
Waneta Dam	75.9 m (249 ft)	450	British Columbia	49°00′14″N 117°36′42″W	1954	BC Hydro, Teck Resources		
Waneta Dam Expansion	75.9 m (249 ft)	335	British Columbia	49°00′14″N 117°36′42″W	2015	FortisBC		

==== Flathead River dams ====
Dams are listed in order from headwater (Confluence of North Fork and Middle Fork Flathead River) to mouth (Clark Fork River). (Note: All forks of Flathead River are treated as being on main stem, as there is only one dam on any of the forks.)

Name	Height	Capacity (MW)	Province/State(s)	Coordinates	Year of completion	Owner	Reservoir formed	Image
Hungry Horse Dam (Note: On South Fork of Flathead River)	564 ft (172 m)	428	Montana	48°20′28″N 114°00′47″W	1953	USBR	Hungry Horse Reservoir	
Seli’š Ksanka Qlispe’ Dam (Kerr Dam)	205 ft (62 m)	188	Montana	47°40′38″N 114°14′02″W	1938	Energy Keepers, Inc.	Raised Flathead Lake 10 ft (3.0 m)	

=== Deschutes River dams ===
Dams are listed in order from headwater (Little Lava Lake, OR) to mouth (Columbia River, WA/OR).

Name	Height	Capacity (MW)	Province/State(s)	Coordinates	Year of completion	Owner	Reservoir formed	Image
Crane Prairie Dam	36 ft (11 m)	0	Oregon	43°45′18″N 121°47′6″W	1940	USBR	Crane Prairie Reservoir	
Wickiup Dam	100 ft (30 m)	0	Oregon	43°41′43″N 121°42′14″W	1949	USBR	Wickiup Reservoir	
Round Butte Dam	440 ft (130 m)	247.12	Oregon	44°36′0″N 121°16′12″W	1964	Portland General Electric Company, Confederated Tribes of the Warm Springs Reservation of Oregon	Lake Billy Chinook	
Pelton Dam	204 ft (62 m)	100.8	Oregon	44°41′24″N 121°13′48″W	1957	Portland General Electric Company, Confederated Tribes of the Warm Springs Reservation of Oregon	Lake Simtustus	
Pelton Reregulating Dam	88 ft (27 m)	18.9	Oregon	44°43′12″N 121°14′24″W	1958	Portland General Electric Company, Confederated Tribes of the Warm Springs Reservation of Oregon		

=== Yakima River dams ===
Dams are listed in order from headwater (Keechelus Lake, WA) to mouth (Columbia River, WA).

Name	Height	Capacity (MW)	Province/State(s)	Coordinates	Year of completion	Owner	Reservoir formed	Image
Keechelus Dam	128 ft (39 m)	0	Washington	47°19′20″N 121°20′22″W	1917	USBR	Raised Keechelus Lake	
Easton Diversion Dam	66 ft (20 m)	0	Washington	47°14′30″N 121°11′17″W	1929	USBR	Lake Easton	
Unnamed Diversion Dam		0	Washington	47°03′50″N 120°39′09″W		USBR		
Roza Diversion Dam	67 ft (20 m)	12	Washington	46°44′56″N 120°27′56″W	1939	USBR		
Wapato Dam	19 ft (5.8 m)	0	Washington	46°31′27″N 120°28′37″W			Wapato Reservoir	
Sunnyside Dam	8 ft (2.4 m)	0	Washington	46°29′52″N 120°26′41″W	1907	Sunnyside Valley Irrigation District		
Prosser Dam	9 ft (2.7 m)	0	Washington	46°12′45″N 119°46′22″W	1904	USBR		
Wannawish Dam	6.6 ft (2.0 m)	0	Washington	46°22′43″N 119°25′02″W	1892			

==== Cle Elum River dams ====
Dams are listed in order from headwaters (near Mount Daniel, WA) to mouth (Yakima River, WA).

Name	Height	Capacity (MW)	Province/State(s)	Coordinates	Year of completion	Owner	Reservoir formed	Image
Cle Elum Dam	165 ft (50 m)	0	Washington	47°14′49″N 121°4′23″W	1933	USBR	Raised Cle Elum Lake	

==== Kachess River dams ====
Dams are listed in order from headwaters (Three Queens, WA) to mouth (Yakima River, WA).

Name	Height	Capacity (MW)	Province/State(s)	Coordinates	Year of completion	Owner	Reservoir formed	Image
Kachess Dam	115 ft (35 m)	0	Washington	47°15′53″N 121°12′9″W	1912	USBR	Raised Kachess Lake	

==== Naches River dams ====
===== Bumping River dams =====
Dams are listed in order from headwaters (near Crag Mountain, WA) to mouth (Naches River, WA).

Name	Height	Capacity (MW)	Province/State(s)	Coordinates	Year of completion	Owner	Reservoir formed	Image
Bumping Lake Dam	60 ft (18 m)	0	Washington	46°52′16″N 121°17′58″W	1910	USBR	Raised Bumping Lake	

===== Tieton River dams =====
Dams are listed in order from headwaters (Goat Rocks, WA) to mouth (Naches River, WA).

Name	Height	Capacity (MW)	Province/State(s)	Coordinates	Year of completion	Owner	Reservoir formed	Image
Clear Creek Dam (North Fork Tieton)	83 ft (25 m)	0	Washington	46°37′40″N 121°16′15″W	1915	USBR	Clear Lake	
Tieton Dam	319 ft (97 m)	0	Washington	46°39′26″N 121°7′41″W	1925	USBR	Rimrock Lake	

=== Willamette River dams ===
Dams are listed in order from headwaters (Confluence of Middle Fork Willamette River and Coast Fork Willamette River, OR/WA) to mouth (Columbia River, OR)

Name	Height	Capacity (MW)	Province/State(s)	Coordinates	Year of completion	Owner	Reservoir formed	Image
Willamette Falls Dam	20 ft (6.1 m)	15.18	Oregon	45°21′11″N 122°37′04″W	1888	Portland General Electric		

==== Santiam River dams ====
Dams are listed in order from headwaters of each fork (North Santiam and South Santiam rivers) to their mouth at the confluence. There are no dams between the confluence and the mouth of the Santiam (Willamette River, OR).

Name	Height	Capacity (MW)	Province/State(s)	Coordinates	Year of completion	Owner	Reservoir formed	Image
North Santiam
Detroit Dam	463 ft (141 m)	100	Oregon	44°43′18″N 122°15′01″W	1953	Army Corps of Engineers	Detroit Reservoir	
Big Cliff Dam	191 ft (58 m)	18	Oregon	44°45′03″N 122°16′59″W	1953	Army Corps of Engineers	Big Cliff Reservoir (reregulation for Detroit Reservoir)	
South Santiam
Green Peter Dam	327 ft (100 m)	80	Oregon	44°27′00″N 122°32′57″W	1968	Army Corps of Engineers	Green Peter Reservoir	
Foster Dam	126 ft (38 m)	20	Oregon	44°24′55″N 122°40′13″W	1968	Army Corps of Engineers	Foster Reservoir (reregulation for Green Peter Reservoir)	

==== Middle Fork Willamette River dams ====
Dams are listed in order from headwater (Timpanogas Lake, OR) to mouth (Willamette River, OR).

Name	Height	Capacity (MW)	Province/State(s)	Coordinates	Year of completion	Owner	Reservoir formed	Image
Hills Creek Dam	304 ft (93 m)	30	Oregon	43°42′33″N 122°25′26″W	1961	USACE	Hills Creek Reservoir	
Lookout Point Dam	276 ft (84 m)	150	Oregon	43°54′48″N 122°45′09″W	1954	USACE	Lookout Point Lake	
Fall Creek Dam	180 ft (55 m)	0	Oregon	43°54′49″N 122°45′25″W	1966	USACE	Fall Creek Reservoir	
Dexter Dam	93 ft (28 m)	15	Oregon	43°55′22″N 122°48′23″W	1954	USACE	Dexter Reservoir	

==== McKenzie River dams ====
Dams are listed in order from headwater (Clear Lake, OR) to mouth (Willamette River, OR).

Name	Height	Capacity (MW)	Province/State(s)	Coordinates	Year of completion	Owner	Reservoir formed	Image
Carmen Diversion Dam	17 ft (5.2 m)	0	Oregon	44°20′19″N 122°00′11″W	1963	Eugene Water & Electric Board	Carmen Reservoir	
Trail Bridge Dam	90 ft (27 m)	10	Oregon	44°16′24″N 122°03′02″W	1963	Eugene Water & Electric Board	Trail Bridge Reservoir	
Smith Dam (Smith River)	250 ft (76 m)	104.5	Oregon	44°0′0″N 122°06′36″W	1963	Eugene Water & Electric Board	Smith Reservoir	
Cougar Dam (South Fork)	425 ft (130 m)	25	Oregon	44°07′44″N 122°14′30″W	1963	Army Corps of Engineers	Cougar Reservoir	
Blue River Dam (Blue River)	270 ft (82 m)	0	Oregon	44°10′23″N 122°19′47″W	1969	Army Corps of Engineers	Blue River Reservoir	
Leaburg Dam	20 ft (6.1 m)	15.9	Oregon	44°08′15″N 122°36′43″W	1929	Eugene Water & Electric Board	Leaburg Reservoir	
Walterville Dam	24 ft (7.3 m)	9	Oregon	44°03′36″N 122°49′48″W	1911	Eugene Water & Electric Board	Walterville Reservoir	

==== Coast Fork Willamette River dams ====
Dams are listed in order from headwater (Confluence of Big River and Garoutte Creek, OR) to mouth (Willamette River).

Name	Height	Capacity (MW)	Province/State(s)	Coordinates	Year of completion	Owner	Reservoir formed	Image
Cottage Grove Dam	95 ft (29 m)	0	Oregon	43°42′58″N 123°03′03″W	1942	USACE	Cottage Grove Lake	
Dorena Dam (Row River)	145 ft (44 m)	7.51	Oregon	43°46′48″N 122°57′0″W	1949	USACE	Dorena Lake	

=== Spokane River dams ===
Dams are listed in order from headwater (Lake Coeur d'Alene, ID) to mouth (Columbia River, WA).

Name	Height	Capacity (MW)	Province/State(s)	Coordinates	Year of completion	Owner	Reservoir formed	Image
Post Falls Dam	64 ft (20 m)	15	Idaho	47°42′31″N 116°57′13″W	1908	Avista	Raised Lake Coeur d'Alene	
Upriver Dam		17.7	Washington	47°41′09″N 117°19′43″W	1894 / 1933 (Note: Originally constructed in 1894, upgraded to concrete structure in 1933, with significant upgrades in the 1980s.)	City of Spokane	Upriver Dam Reservoir	
Upper Falls Dam	35 ft (11 m)	10	Washington	47°39′46″N 117°24′55″W	1922	Avista	Upper Falls Reservoir	
Monroe Street Dam	24 ft (7.3 m)	15	Washington	47°39′42″N 117°25′31″W	1890	Avista		
Nine Mile Dam	58 ft (18 m)	26	Washington	47°46′30″N 117°32′38″W	1908	Avista	Nine Mile Reservoir	
Long Lake Dam	213 ft (65 m)	71	Washington	47°50′14″N 117°50′23″W	1915	Avista	Long Lake	
Little Falls Dam	57 ft (17 m)	36	Washington	47°49′57″N 117°55′04″W	1911	Avista	Little Falls Pool	

=== Cowlitz River dams ===
Dams are listed in order from headwater (confluence of the Ohanapecosh River and the Clear Fork of the Cowlitz River, WA) to mouth (Columbia River, WA)

Name	Height	Capacity (MW)	Province/State(s)	Coordinates	Year of completion	Owner	Reservoir formed	Image=
Cowlitz Falls Dam	140 ft (43 m)	70	Washington	46°27′59″N 122°06′33″W	1994	Lewis County Public Utility District	Lake Scanewa	
Mossyrock Dam	606 ft (185 m)	300	Washington	46°32′04″N 122°25′29″W	1968	Tacoma Public Utilities	Riffe Lake	
Mayfield Dam	250 ft (76 m)	162	Washington	46°30′10″N 122°35′18″W	1963	Tacoma Public Utilities	Lake Mayfield	Mayfield Dam

=== Lewis River dams ===
Dams are listed in order from headwater (Adams Glacier, Mount Adams, WA) to mouth (Columbia River, WA)

Name	Height	Capacity (MW)	Province/State(s)	Coordinates	Year of completion	Owner	Reservoir formed	Image
Swift Dam	512 ft (156 m)	240	Washington	46°04′48″N 122°12′36″W	1958	PacifiCorp	Swift Reservoir	
Swift No. 2 Dam	83 ft (25 m)	70	Washington	46°03′46″N 122°11′52″W	1959	Public Utility District No. 1 of Cowlitz County		
Yale Dam	323 ft (98 m)	134	Washington	45°58′48″N 122°20′24″W	1953	PacifiCorp	Yale Lake	
Merwin Dam	313 ft (95 m)	136	Washington	45°59′24″N 122°28′48″W	1931	PacifiCorp	Lake Merwin	

=== Spillimacheen River dams ===
Dams are listed in order from headwater (Canadian Rockies) to mouth (Columbia River, BC).

Name	Height	Capacity (MW)	Province/State(s)	Coordinates	Year of completion	Owner	Reservoir formed	Image
Spillimacheen Dam	14.5 m (48 ft)	4	British Columbia	50°53′56″N 116°25′28″W	1955	BC Hydro	Spillimacheen Dam Pool	

=== Wenatchee River dams ===
Dams are listed in order from headwater (Lake Wenatchee, WA) to mouth (Columbia River, WA)

Name	Height	Capacity (MW)	Province/State(s)	Coordinates	Year of completion	Owner	Reservoir formed	Image
Tumwater Canyon Dam	23 ft (7.0 m)	0	Washington	47°36′59″N 120°43′22″W	1909	Chelan County Public Utility District	Lake Jolanda	

=== Chelan River dams ===
Dams are listed in order from headwater (Lake Chelan, WA) to mouth (Columbia River, WA)

Name	Height	Capacity (MW)	Province/State(s)	Coordinates	Year of completion	Owner	Reservoir formed	Image
Lake Chelan Dam	40 ft (12 m)	59.2	Washington	47°50′04″N 120°00′45″W	1892–1903 / 1927 (Note: Beginning in 1892, dams were constructed at the mouth of Lake Chelan. After two failures, a more robust dam was constructed in 1903, providing electricity to Chelan. The current dam was completed in 1927.)	Chelan County Public Utility District	Raised Lake Chelan	

== See also ==
- List of lakes in Washington (state)
- List of tallest dams in the world
- Dams in the Colorado River system
- List of reservoirs and dams in the United States
- Columbia River Treaty (US–Canadian treaty regulating hydroelectric development)
