= American Rivers =

American nonprofit organization

- Formation: March 1973; 53 years ago
- Type: Nonprofit
- Legal status: 501(c)(3)
- Purpose: Healthy rivers, clean water, habitat restoration
- Headquarters: Washington, D.C.
- Staff: 97 (2025)
- Website: americanrivers.org

American Rivers is a national conservation nonprofit working to make every river clean and healthy for people and wildlife. Established in 1973, the group is headquartered in Washington, D.C. and focuses on protecting and restoring rivers in the United States.

== Activities ==
=== River protection ===
American Rivers' goal is to safeguard 1 million miles of rivers, from remote mountain streams to urban waterways. It does this by advocating for local, state, and federal protection for our nation’s healthiest, most beautiful waterways and rivers near where people live. This includes protecting headwaters streams and the waters that flow across public lands, which are the drinking water sources for millions of people.

=== River restoration ===
American Rivers advocates for the restoration of rivers and streams that have been damaged by human activity. Primarily, this involves dam removal, culvert replacement, and floodplain restoration. The organization has been directly involved in over 200 dam removals and has provided technical support, advise, and funding resources to thousands more. American Rivers also maintains a public database of all known dam removals in the United States since 1912, and publishes reports on the state of dam removal in the country.

=== America's Most Endangered Rivers ===
Each year since 1984, American Rivers has published a report on America's Most Endangered Rivers — 10 rivers whose futures hang in the balance. The America's Most Endangered Rivers report gives three criteria for inclusion on the list:

- The river is of regional or national significance to people and wildlife.
- The river and communities that depend on it are under significant threat.
- The river will face a major decision in the coming year that the public can help influence.

=== Clean water and city rivers ===
More than 80 percent of people in the United States live in cities. All cities sit on top of a network of rivers, creeks, and streams. When thriving, these waterways provide access to nature, wildlife habitat, clean water, and a buffer against droughts and floods. American Rivers' vision is to make the rivers in every city and town clean enough to swim and play in. They work with cities to keep stormwater pollution and trash out of the rivers that flow through neighborhoods. They also rehabilitate rivers and creeks close to where most of us live, so that people in urban areas can safely enjoy their city waterways.

=== River of the Year ===
In 2019, American Rivers announced its first "River of the Year". The designation recognizes historically degraded rivers that have made significant progress toward recovery.

Year	River	Rationale
2024	Klamath River	The removal of the four dams on the lower Klamath following decades of activism by the Un-Dam the Klamath movement.
2022	Neuse River	Decades of pollution mitigation assisted by the Clean Water Act, commemorating its 50th anniversary.
2020	Delaware River	75 years of progress in reducing pollution and restoring wildlife.
2019	Cuyahoga River	50 years of progress in restoring the Cuyahoga since it caught fire in 1969.
