= Swift Reservoir =

- Location within Washington (state) Location within the United States
- Location: Skamania County, Washington, United States
- Coordinates: 46°03′N 122°06′W
- Type: reservoir
- Primary inflows: Lewis River
- Primary outflows: Lewis River
- Catchment area: 481 square miles (1,250 km^{2})
- Basin countries: United States
- Surface area: 4,620 acres (18.7 km^{2})
- Water volume: 755,600 acre-feet (0.932 km^{3})
- Surface elevation: 1,012 ft (308 m)
- Islands: 1

Swift Reservoir is a reservoir on the Lewis River in the U.S. state of Washington. It is located in Skamania County. It was created in 1958 with the construction of Swift Dam. It has a singular island by the name of Sensi Island.

== See also ==
- List of lakes in Washington (state)
- List of dams in the Columbia River watershed
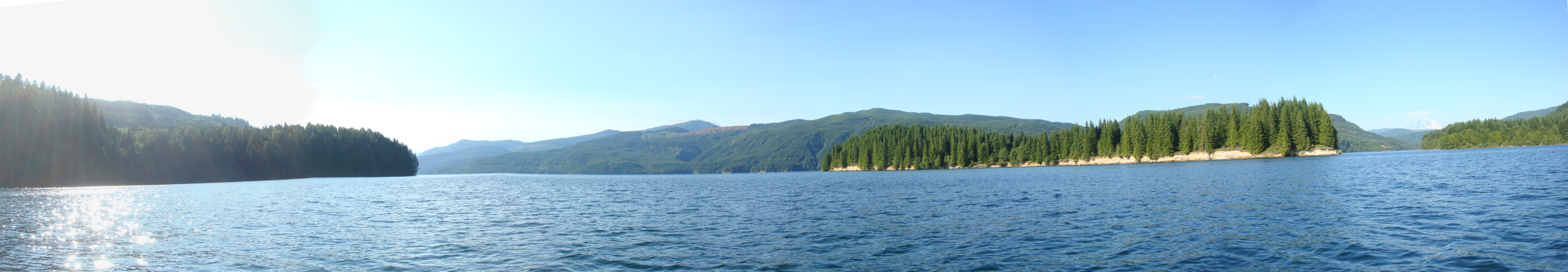
Swift Reservoir from the south looking north
