= Gem State Dam =

- Location within Idaho
- Interactive map of Gem State Dam
- Location: Bonneville County, Idaho
- Coordinates: 43°25′15″N 112°6′7″W
- Opening date: 1988
- Operator: City of Idaho Falls

Dam and spillways
- Impounds: Snake River
- Height: 40 ft (12 m)

Reservoir
- Total capacity: 6,700 acre-feet (8,300,000 m^{3})
- Catchment area: 9,800 sq mi (25,382 km^{2})
- Surface area: 305 acres (1.23 km^{2})

Power Station
- Installed capacity: 22.6 MW

Gem State Dam is a concrete and rock-fill gravity dam on the Snake River, in the U.S. state of Idaho. Its location is near Idaho Falls, Idaho. The dam's primary purpose is to generate hydroelectricity, but it also provides water for irrigation agriculture.

Gem State Dam is owned and operated by the City of Idaho Falls.

== See also ==
- List of dams in the Columbia River watershed
