= Swift Dam =

- Location within Washington (state) Location within the United States
- Official name: Swift No. 1 Dam
- Location: Skamania County, Washington, U.S.
- Coordinates: 46°3′47″N 122°11′52″W
- Opening date: 1958
- Operator: PacifiCorp

Dam and spillways
- Impounds: Lewis River
- Height: 512 ft (156 m)
- Length: 2,100 ft (640 m)

Reservoir
- Creates: Swift Reservoir
- Total capacity: 755,600 acre-feet (0.932 km^{3})
- Catchment area: 481 square miles (1,250 km^{2})
- Surface area: 4,620 acres (1,870 ha)

Power Station
- Operator: PacifiCorp
- Turbines: 3x 80.0 MW
- Installed capacity: 240.0 MW
- Annual generation: 519.481 GWh

Swift Dam or Swift No. 1 is an earth-type hydroelectric dam on the Lewis River, in the U.S. state of Washington. Completed in 1958, it is located in Skamania County and its reservoir is called Swift Reservoir.

== Hydroelectric power capacity ==
Generator	Nameplate Capacity (MW)
HY11	80.0
HY12	80.0
HY13	80.0
Total	240.0

== See also ==
- List of dams in the Columbia River watershed
- List of lakes in Washington (state)
