= Lake Sacajawea =

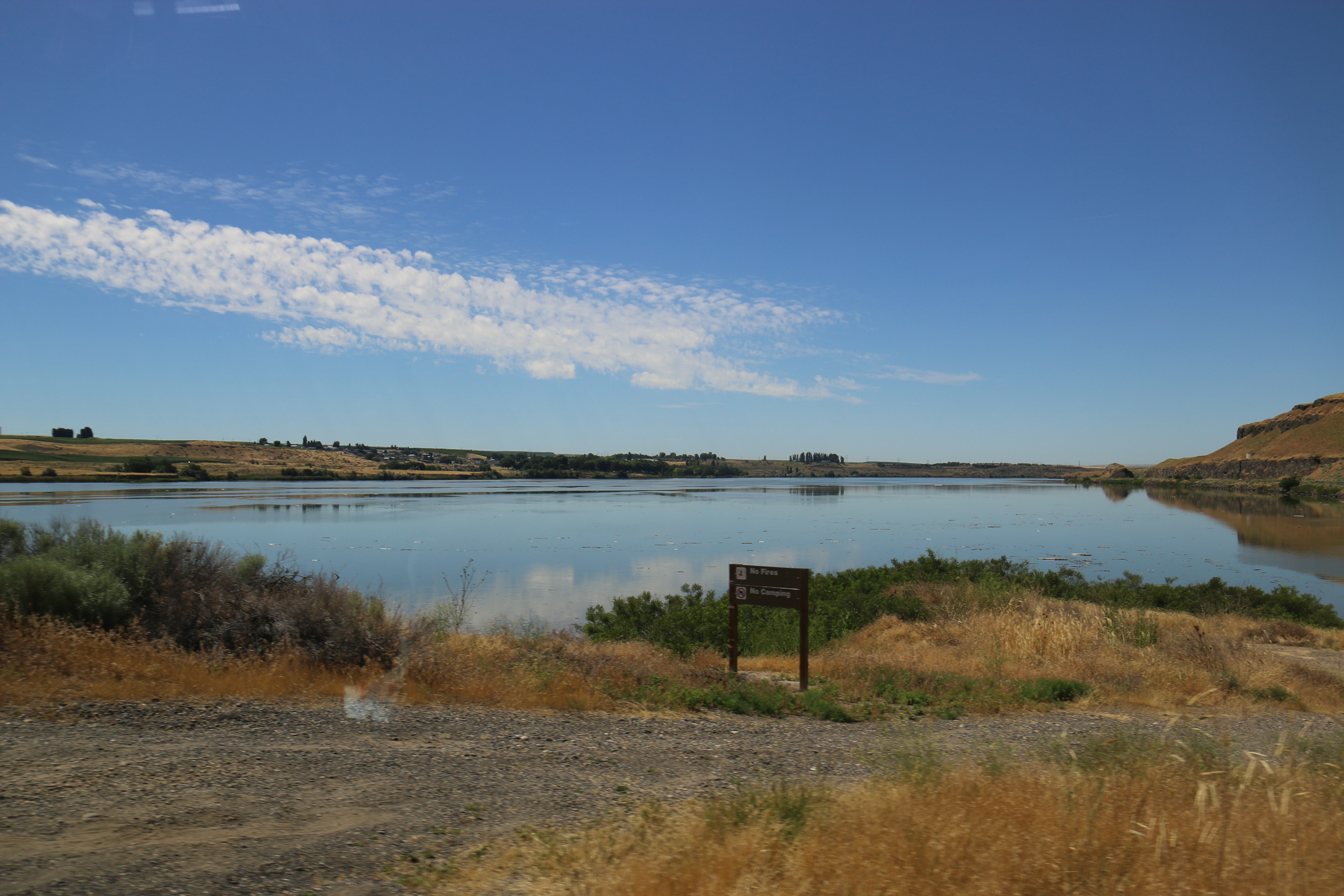
- Overview of the lake in 2017

- Location within Washington (state) Location within the United States
- Location: Franklin / Walla Walla counties, Washington, United States
- Coordinates: 46°14′58″N 118°52′47″W
- Type: reservoir
- Primary inflows: Snake River
- Primary outflows: Snake River
- Basin countries: United States

Lake Sacajawea is a lake formed by the Ice Harbor Dam on the Snake River. It stretches from there upstream to the Lower Monumental Dam. It is named for Sacajawea, a Shoshone woman who accompanied Meriwether Lewis and William Clark during their exploration of the American.
