= Hunter Creek (St. Francis River tributary) =

Stream in Missouri, U.S.

Hunter Creek is a stream in northwest Wayne County in the U.S. state of Missouri. It is a tributary of the St. Francis River.

The stream headwaters arises at 37°15′10″N 90°23′46″W and it flows northwest and then west to its confluence with the St. Francis at 37°15′51″N 90°27′20″W. Just east of the confluence the stream crosses under US Route 67 north of the community of Lodi.

Hunter Creek is named for John Hunter, an early citizen.

== See also ==
- List of rivers of Missouri
