= Lake Herbert G. West =

- West Lake
- Location within Washington (state) Location within the United States
- Location: Franklin, Walla Walla, Columbia and Whitman counties, Washington state, U.S.
- Coordinates: 46°33′45″N 118°32′15″W
- Type: Reservoir
- Primary inflows: Snake River
- Primary outflows: Snake River
- Basin countries: United States
- Surface area: 6,590 acres (2,670 ha)
- Water volume: 465,000,000 m^{3} (1.64×10^{10} cu ft)
- Surface elevation: 541 feet (165 m)

Lake Herbert G. West (or Lake West) is a reservoir formed by the Lower Monumental Dam in the U.S. state of Washington. It extends up the Snake River for 28 miles (45 km) to the tailwater of Little Goose Dam. It has a surface area of 6,590 acres (27 km^{2}), a maximum storage capacity of 432,000 acre-feet (533,000,000 m^{3}), normally kept at 377,000 acre-feet (465,000,000 m^{3}).

As the reservoir filled in 1968, it flooded several archaeological sites, including the Marmes Rockshelter, which contained the oldest known artifacts in Washington, dating back over 10,000 years.

The lake was named for Herbert G. West, a major promoter of inland navigation on the Columbia and Snake rivers.
