= Lower Monumental Dam =

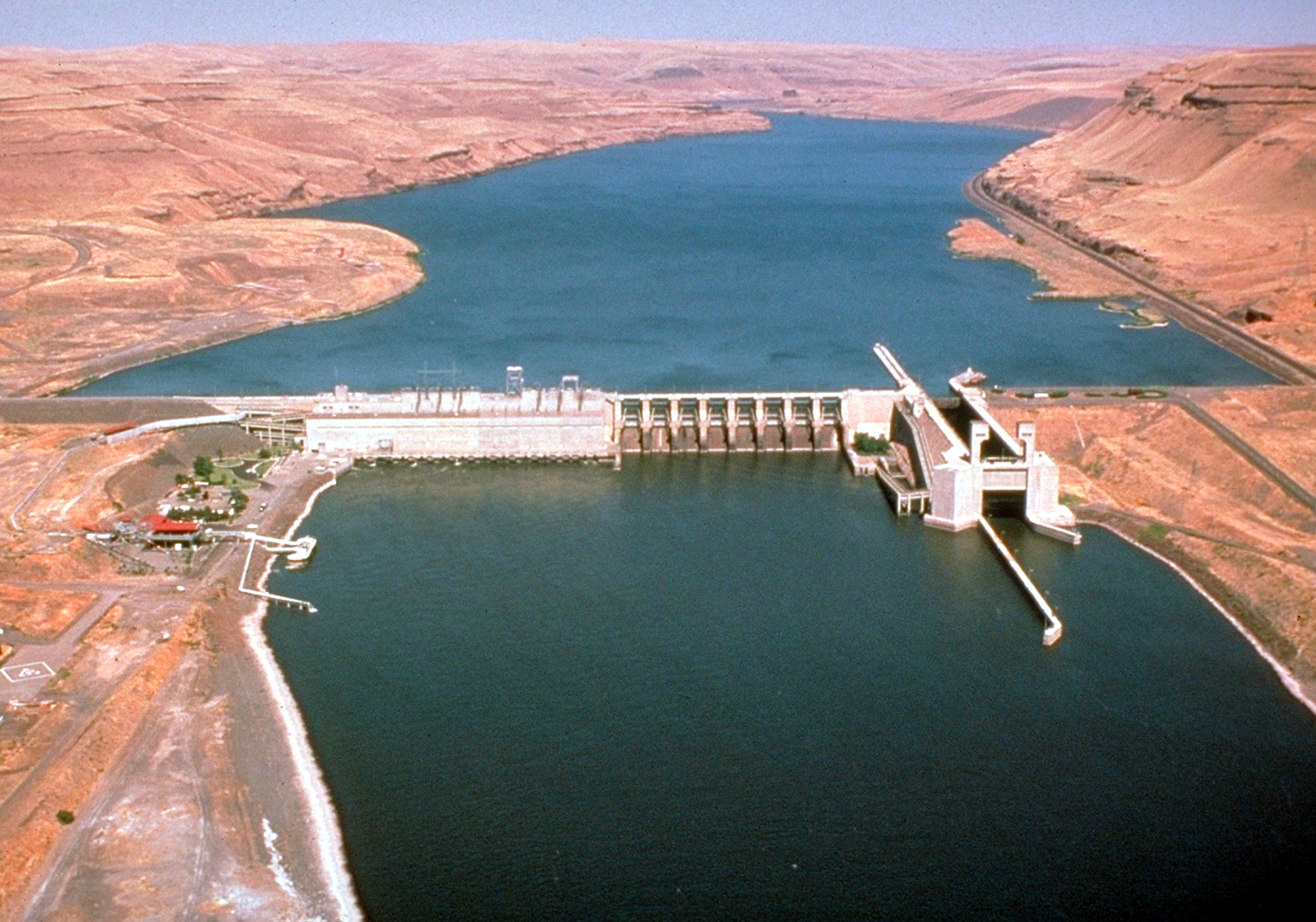
- View from the southwest

- Location in the United States Location in Washington
- Country: United States
- Location: Franklin and Walla Walla counties, Washington
- Coordinates: 46.563°N 118.539°W
- Construction began: June 1961
- Opening date: 1969; 57 years ago
- Operators: U.S. Army; Corps of Engineers

Dam and spillways
- Type of dam: Concrete gravity, run-of-the-river
- Impounds: Snake River
- Height: 100 feet (30 m)
- Length: 3,791 feet (1,155 m)
- Spillway type: Service, gate-controlled

Reservoir
- Creates: Lake Herbert G. West
- Total capacity: 432,000 acre⋅ft (0.53 km^{3})
- Surface area: 6,590 acres (26.7 km^{2})
- Normal elevation: 540 ft (165 m)

Power Station
- Turbines: 6 x 135-153 MW
- Installed capacity: 810 MW; 932 MW (max)
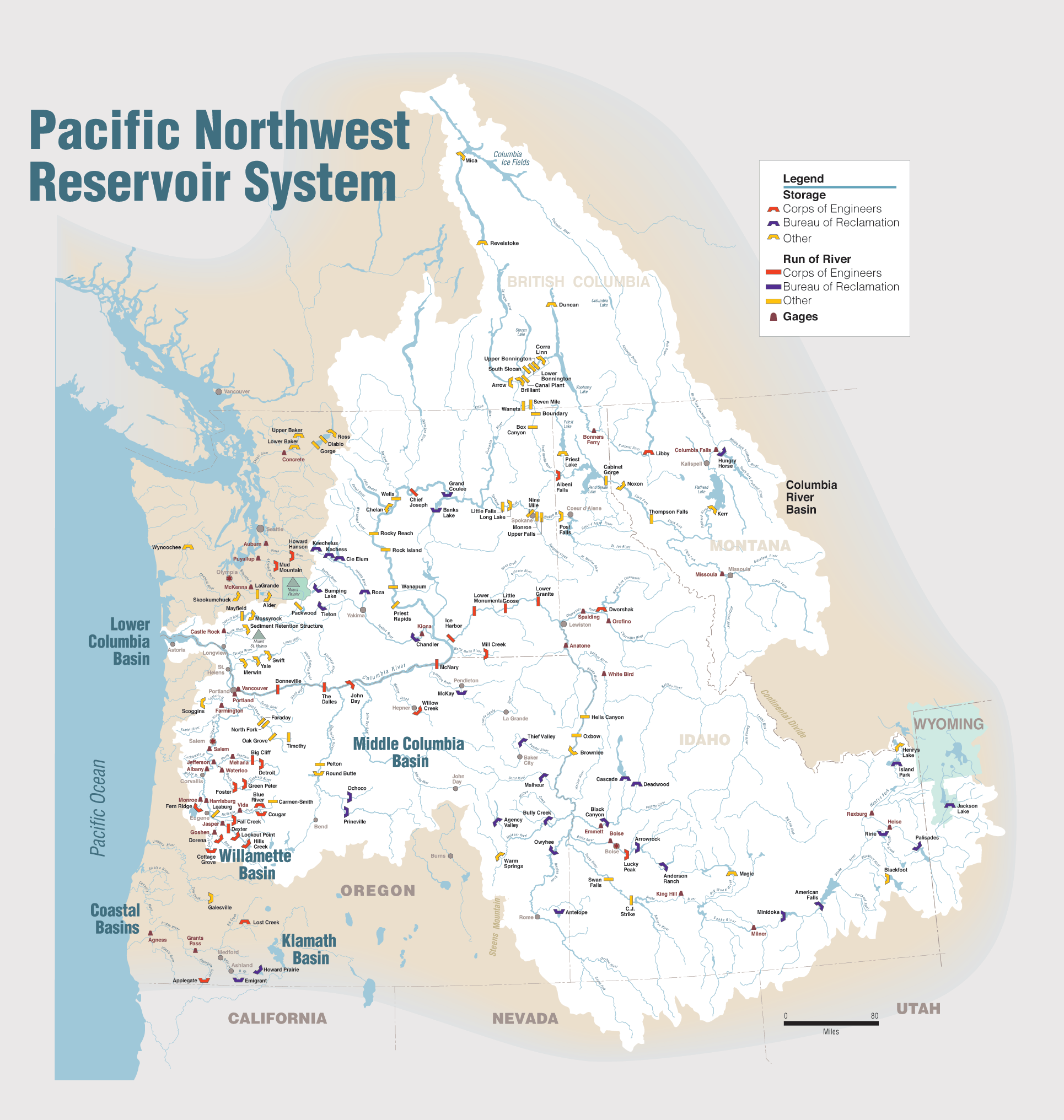
- Columbia River Basin

Lower Monumental Lock and Dam is a hydroelectric, concrete, run-of-the-river dam in the northwest United States. Located on the lower Snake River in southeast Washington, it bridges Franklin and Walla Walla counties; it is six miles (10 km) south of Kahlotus and 43 miles (70 km) north of Walla Walla.

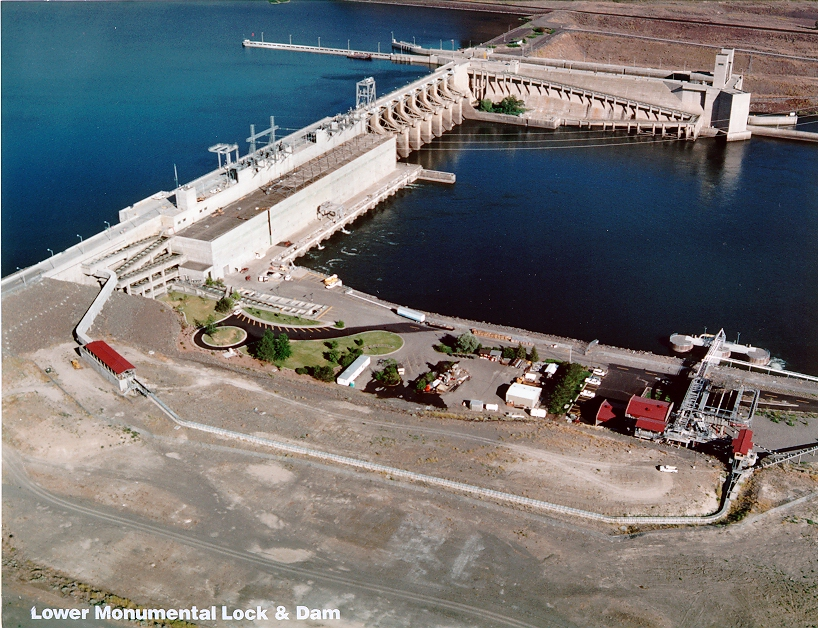
Lower Monumental Dam with the lock in the center of the river (far side in photo), the power generation on the northwest side of the river, and spillway in the middle of the dam, between the powerhouse and the lock.

Construction began in June 1961, and the main structure and three generators were completed 57 years ago in 1969, with an additional three generators finished in 1981. Generating capacity is 810 megawatts, with an overload capacity of 932 MW. The spillway has eight gates and is 572 feet (174 m) in length.

Its construction led to the inundation of the Marmes Rockshelter archaeological site in 1969, the site of the oldest human remains in North America at that time.

Built and operated by the U.S. Army Corps of Engineers, Lower Monumental Dam is part of the Columbia River Basin system of dams.

Behind the dam, Lake Herbert G. West is the reservoir; it extends 28 miles (45 km) east to the base of Little Goose Dam. Lake Sacajawea, formed from Ice Harbor Dam, runs 22 miles (35 km) southwest, downstream from the base of the dam.

Navigation lock

- Single-lift
- Width: 86 ft (26 m)
- Length: 666 ft (203 m)

== See also ==
- List of dams in the Columbia River watershed
- Lower Granite Dam
- Little Goose Dam
- Ice Harbor Dam
