= Little Goose Dam =

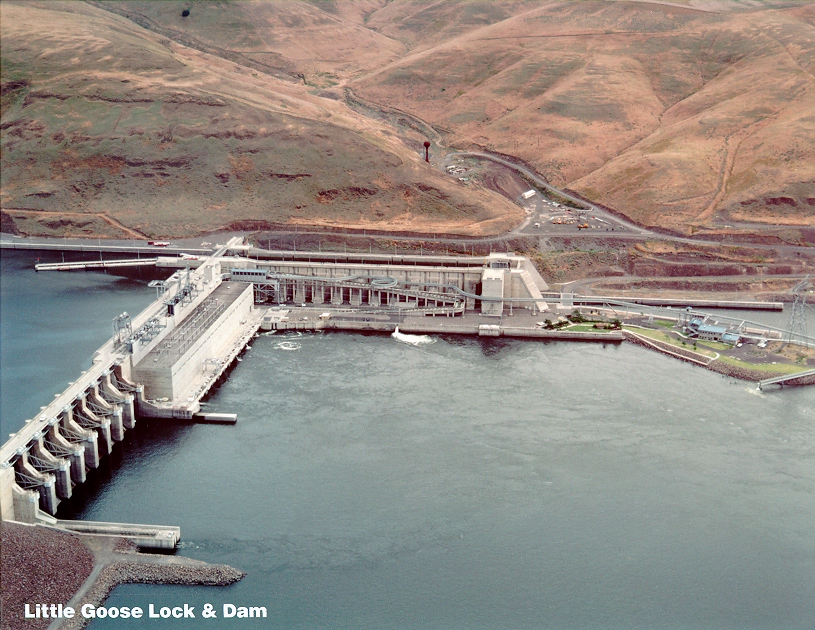
- From the north side of the Snake River

- Location in the United States Location in Washington
- Country: United States
- Location: Columbia / Whitman counties, Washington
- Coordinates: 46.587°N 118.028°W
- Construction began: June 1963
- Opening date: 1970; 56 years ago
- Operators: U.S. Army; Corps of Engineers

Dam and spillways
- Type of dam: Concrete-gravity, run-of-the-river
- Height: 98 ft (30 m)
- Length: 2,655 ft (809 m)
- Elevation at crest: 643 ft (196 m) AMSL
- Spillway type: Service, gate-controlled

Reservoir
- Creates: Lake Bryan
- Total capacity: 516,300 acre⋅ft (0.637 km^{3})
- Surface area: 10,025 acres (40.57 km^{2})

Power Station
- Turbines: 6 units x 135–153 MW (181,000–205,000 hp)
- Installed capacity: 932 MW (1,250,000 hp)
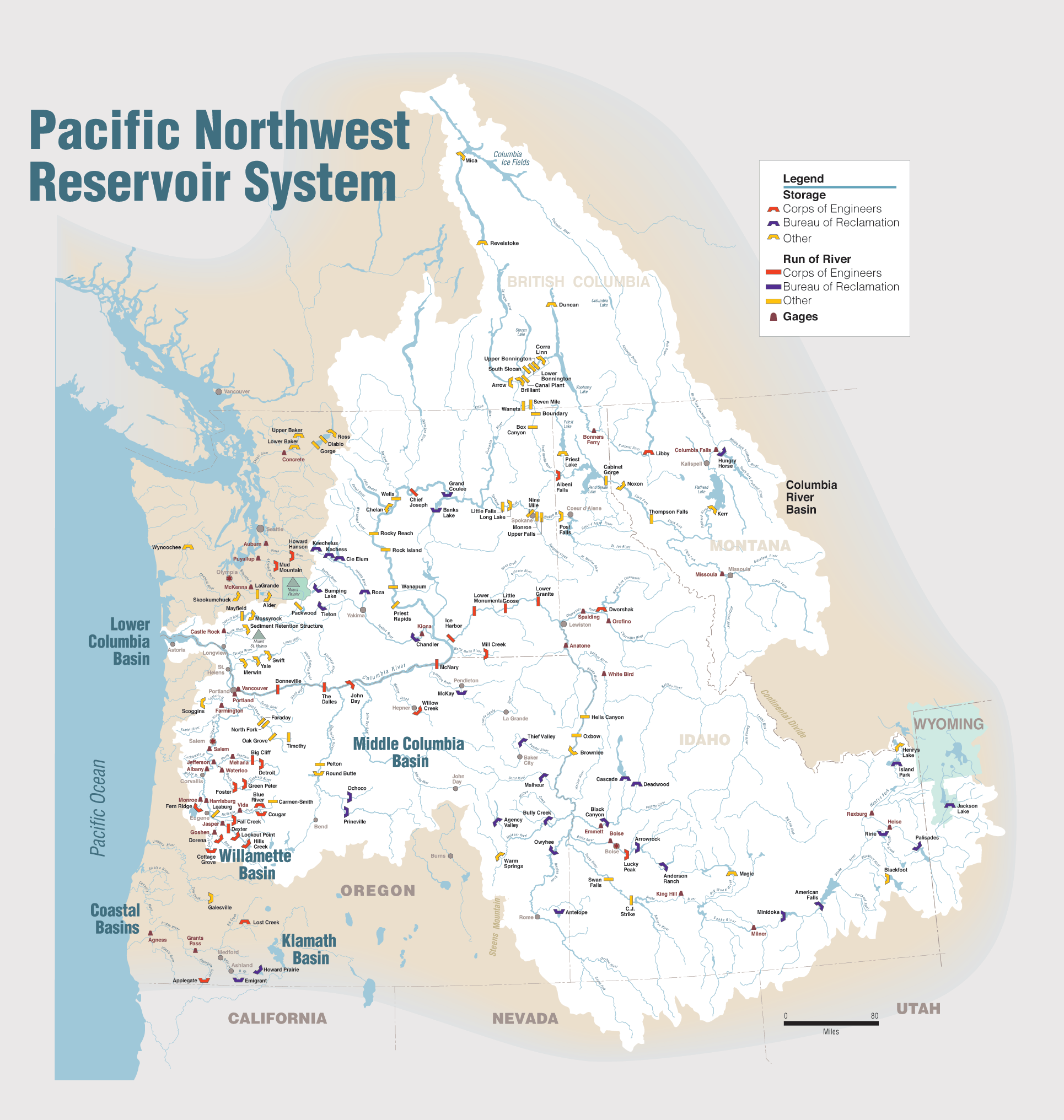
- Columbia River Basin

Little Goose Lock and Dam is a hydroelectric, concrete, run-of-the-river dam in the northwest United States, on the lower Snake River in southeast Washington. At the dam, the river is the border between Columbia and Whitman counties; it is nine miles (14 km) northeast of Starbuck and 25 miles (40 km) north of Dayton.

== Description ==
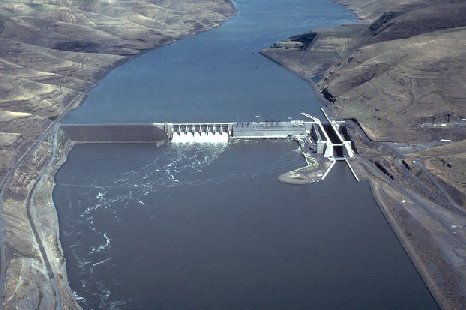
Looking east, Little Goose Dam with lock & fish ladder on the right (south side of the river), spillway in the middle of the dam, and the power generation between the spillway and the lock.

Little Goose Dam is part of the Columbia River Basin system of dams. Lake Bryan, named for Enoch Albert Bryan, is formed behind the dam. The lake stretches to the base of Lower Granite Dam, 37 miles (60 km) upstream. Lake Herbert G. West, formed from Lower Monumental Dam runs 28 miles (45 km) downstream from the base of the dam.

Generating capacity is 810 megawatts (1,090,000 hp), with an overload capacity of 932 megawatts (1,250,000 hp); the spillway has eight gates and is 512 feet (156 m) in length.

Navigation lock

- Single-lift
- 86 feet (26 m) wide
- 668 feet (204 m) long

== History ==
Construction began in June 1963 on what was Little Goose Island. The main structure and three generators were completed 56 years ago in 1970, with an additional three generators finished in 1978.

There have been calls to remove the Little Goose Lock and Dam along with the other Lower Snake River (LSR) dams due to their impact on the salmon population and the fishing rights of local Native American tribes in the region. Those in favor of keeping the dam argue that removing it would cause more reliance on fossil fuel based energy. Some species of salmon native to the Columbia River Basin are protected under the Endangered Species Act, which requires the federal government to come up with a plan to restore their populations. Breaching the Little Goose Dam and the other LSR dams is considered by many environmentalists to be the best option in restoring salmon populations quickly before they completely die out.

In 1855 and 1856, the federal government negotiated treaties with local Columbia River Basin tribes that guaranteed them the right to fish for salmon in areas where people had started to colonize in exchange for several million acres of land. Tribes are arguing now that they can’t fish for salmon on ancestral lands anymore because the populations have declined so dramatically as a result of the dams. The Nez Perce Tribe, located in the area nearest to the Little Goose Lock and Dam, is one of the many Pacific Northwest (PNW) Tribes fighting for the LSR dams to be breached. Salmon and the acts of hunting and fishing are culturally significant to the tribes living in the Columbia River Basin. Salmon fishing is not only a major source of subsistence, but a spiritual tether to the land.

The dams have altered the landscape where tribes have historically carried out their ways of life. It’s estimated that nearly 34,000 acres of land and 150 miles of riverside would be restored if the dams were breached, allowing tribal hunting and fishing to be revitalized in areas that have been flooded and/or engineered for decades. Breaching the dams would also provide PNW tribes along the Columbia River Basin the chance to care for and reconnect with places that are considered sacred or used for ceremonial purposes. Tribes argue the dams have significantly reduced tribal wealth and well-being; tearing them down would not only help restore the salmon population but also provide justice to PNW tribes.

The Little Goose Dam alone generates 810 megawatts (MW) of electricity. The combined generated electricity of the 4 LSR dams is about 3000 MWs, or enough electricity to light 50 million light bulbs. Some argue breaching the dams would lead to fossil fuel reliance in the region. The Washington State Government has a goal of reaching net-zero carbon emissions by 2050 and are highly considering solar and wind power to be the replacement energy sources for the dam.

== See also ==
- List of dams in the Columbia River watershed
- Ice Harbor Dam
- Little Goose Dam in Grand Forks County, North Dakota
