= Hunter Creek (Columbia River tributary) =

Stream in Washington state, U.S.

Coordinates: 48°06′46″N 118°13′38″W

Hunter Creek is a stream in the U.S. state of Washington. It is a tributary of the Columbia River.

Hunter Creek James Hunter, a pioneer settler.

== See also ==
- List of rivers of Washington (state)
