= Lower Granite Dam =

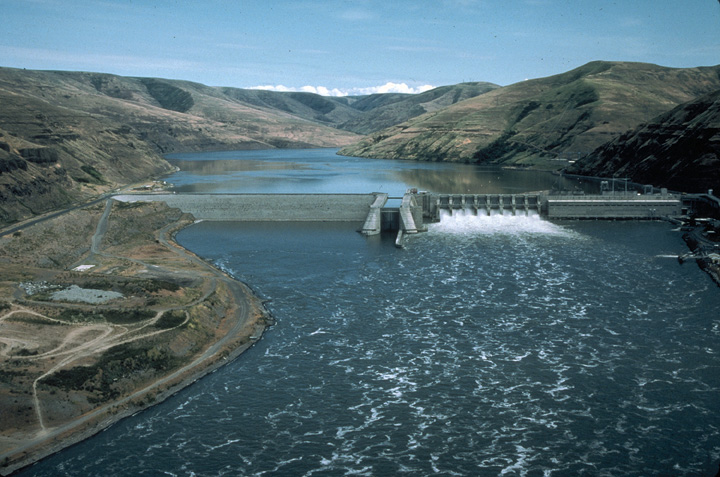
- View from the northwest

- Location in the United States Location in Washington
- Country: United States
- Location: Garfield and Whitman counties, Washington
- Coordinates: 46°39′38″N 117°25′41″W
- Construction began: July 1965
- Opening date: June 1975; 51 years ago
- Construction cost: $624,098,663 ($3.53 billion in 2025)
- Operators: U.S. Army; Corps of Engineers

Dam and spillways
- Type of dam: Gravity dam
- Impounds: Snake River
- Height: 100 ft (30 m)
- Length: 3,200 ft (980 m)
- Spillway type: Service, gate-controlled
- Spillway capacity: 850,000 cu ft/s (24,000 m^{3}/s)

Reservoir
- Creates: Lower Granite Lake
- Total capacity: 440,200 acre⋅ft (0.543 km^{3})
- Surface area: 8,900 acres (36.0 km^{2})
- Normal elevation: 741 ft (226 m)

Power Station
- Type: Run-of-the-river
- Turbines: 6 × 135-155 MW units
- Installed capacity: 810 MW
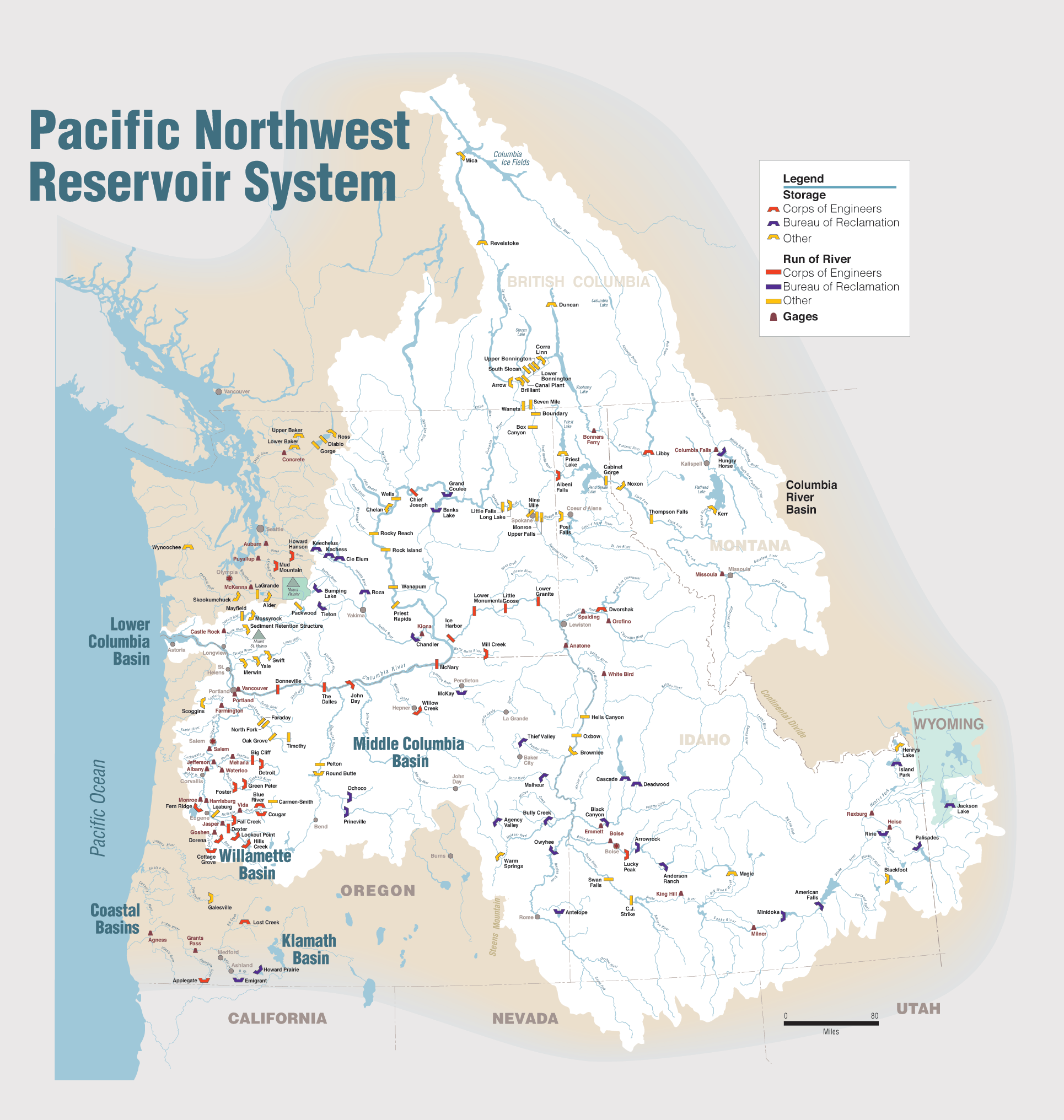
- Columbia River Basin

Lower Granite Lock and Dam is a concrete gravity run-of-the-river dam in southeastern Washington in the United States. On the lower Snake River, it bridges Whitman and Garfield counties. Opened 51 years ago in 1975, the dam is located 22 miles (35 km) south of Colfax and 35 miles (56 km) north of Pomeroy.

Lower Granite Dam is part of the Columbia River Basin system of dams, built and operated by the U.S. Army Corps of Engineers; power generated is distributed by the Bonneville Power Administration (BPA).

Behind the dam, Lower Granite Lake extends 39 miles (63 km) east to the confluence with the Clearwater River at Lewiston, Idaho, and allowed the city to become a port. The first barge to Portland on the 374-mile (602 km) navigation route was loaded with wheat and departed Lewiston on August 9, 1975.

Lake Bryan, formed from Little Goose Dam, runs 37 miles (60 km) downstream from the base of the dam.

== Construction ==
Construction began in July 1965, but was halted less than two years later due to lack of funding. Work restarted in 1970, concrete was first poured in 1971, and the main structure and three generators were completed in 1975, with dedication ceremonies on June 19. An additional three generators were finished in May 1978, bringing the generating capacity to 810 megawatts, with an overload capacity of 932 MW.

The spillway has eight gates and is 512 feet (156 m) in length. An 86-by-674-foot (26 by 205 m) navigation lock was also included in construction.

Just downstream (northwest) of the dam on the east bank, Boyer Park was constructed by the Corps of Engineers and opened in April 1973.

== Fishery ==
Lower Granite Dam is the most upstream dam in the Snake River system that has a fish ladder to allow adult salmon and steelhead to migrate upstream. The Columbia River treaty tribes, along with some environmental groups, have recommended that this dam along with the other three lower Snake River dams be decommissioned and/or removed because of their impact on threatened and endangered chinook (threatened) and sockeye salmon (endangered) and steelhead (threatened) populations., The Corps of Engineers recognized in 1971 that the dam would have a detrimental impact on wildlife.

A significant increase in the sockeye salmon return to the Columbia River in 2008 proved a pleasant surprise and raised hopes for increased salmon runs across the Lower Granite. Wildlife officials were not certain of the reason for the increased salmon return (Idaho Statesman, June 28, 2008). The Corps of Engineers has installed new devices, such as removable spillway weirs, in an attempt to make the dam less harmful to juvenile salmon.

There is also a juvenile bypass/collection facility that collects juvenile migrating salmon and steelhead so they can be transported downstream by barge.

=== Navigation lock ===
- Single-lift
- Width: 86 feet (26 m)
- Length: 674 feet (205 m)

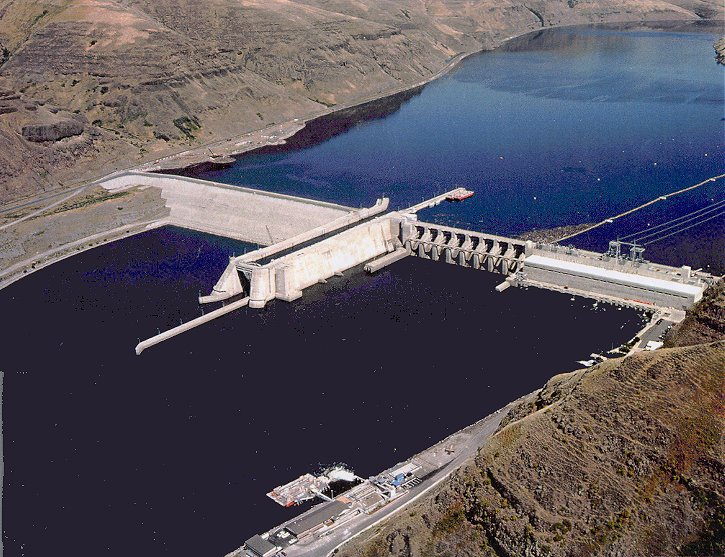
Lower Granite Dam with the lock in the center, the power generation on the south side of the river (right side of the photo), and spillway in the middle of the dam, between the powerhouse and the lock.

== Asotin Dam ==
Authorized by Congress in 1962, a fifth dam on the lower Snake River was proposed several miles upstream (south) of Lewiston. Concerns over its environmental and recreational impact stalled the Asotin Dam project, and it was ultimately canceled in 1980. The Asotin County public utilities district attempted to revive the project in 1988, but it was quickly blocked by Congress, and a law banning future dams was signed into law by President Reagan on November 17.

Other proposed dams further upstream were not built either: the High Mountain Sheep Dam above the confluence with the Salmon River, and the Nez Perce Dam, just below it.

== Road closed ==
Following the September 11 attacks in 2001, the road across the Lower Granite Dam was closed for over six years; it reopened for weekend traffic in May 2008. The sand dune area downstream on the south shore (46.696°N 117.48°W), accessed over the dam, was popular with local college students from Washington State University and the University of Idaho.

== See also ==
- List of dams in the Columbia River watershed
- Ice Harbor Dam
- Little Goose Dam
- Lower Monumental Dam
