= Ice Harbor Dam =

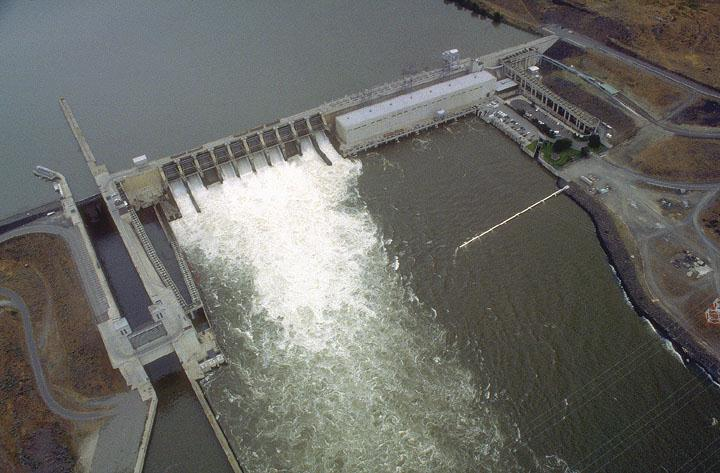
- Aerial view from northwest

- Location in the United States Location in Washington
- Country: United States
- Location: Franklin and Walla Walla counties, Washington
- Coordinates: 46.25°N 118.88°W
- Construction began: June 1955
- Opening date: 1962; 64 years ago
- Owners: U.S. Army; Corps of Engineers

Dam and spillways
- Type of dam: Concrete gravity
- Impounds: Snake River
- Height: 100 feet (30 m)
- Length: 2,822 feet (860 m)
- Spillway type: Service, gate-controlled

Reservoir
- Creates: Lake Sacajawea
- Total capacity: 249,000 acre⋅ft (0.307 km^{3})
- Surface area: 8,375 acres (33.89 km^{2})
- Normal elevation: 443 feet (135 m) AMSL

Power Station
- Type: Run-of-the-river
- Turbines: 3x 90 MW units; 3x 111 MW units
- Installed capacity: 603 MW
- Annual generation: 1,340.864 GWh
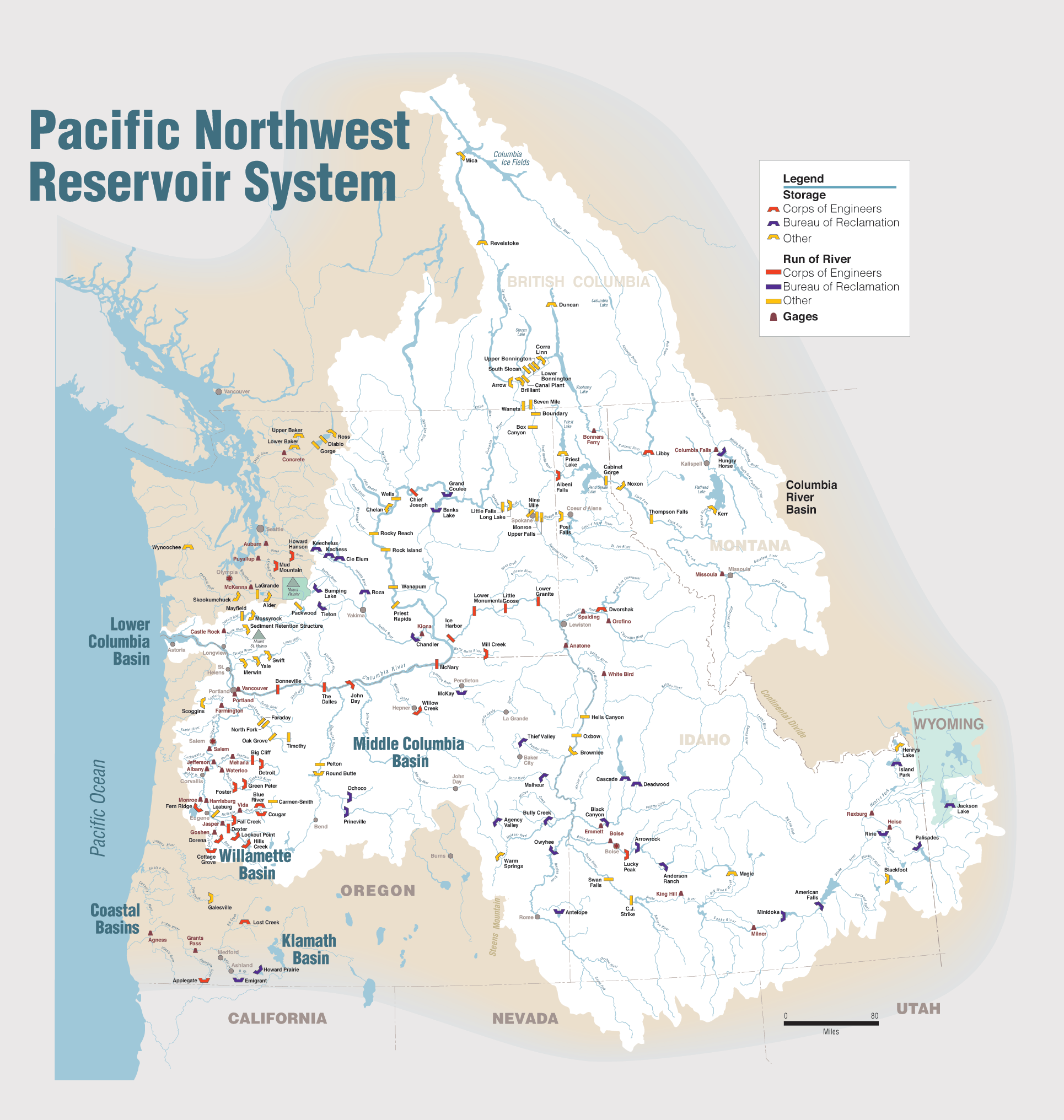
- Columbia River Basin

Ice Harbor Lock and Dam is a hydroelectric, concrete gravity run-of-the-river dam in the northwest United States. On the lower Snake River in southeastern Washington, it bridges Walla Walla and Franklin counties. Located eight miles (13 km) northeast of Burbank and twelve miles (19 km) east of Pasco, river mile 9.7, the dam's name comes from a tiny bay in the river where boats once tied up to wait for upstream ice-jams to break up.

Construction began in June 1955; the main structure and three generators were completed 65 years ago in 1961, with an additional three generators finished in 1976. Generating capacity is 603 megawatts, with an overload capacity of 693 MW. The spillway has ten gates and is 590 feet (180 m) in length.

== Dam system ==
Built and operated by the U.S. Army Corps of Engineers, Ice Harbor Dam is part of the Columbia River Basin system of dams.

== Visitor center ==
Inside the dam on the south side of the river is a large visitor center that has been recently updated to include a new film "The Snake - River of Life" and a new modern interactive touch screen kiosk with information on the dam and recreational opportunities in the area. The visitor center also has a fish ladder viewing room which offers an excellent view of migrating salmon, steelhead, and shad. Due to security, visitors must pass through the security gate to gain access.

== Surrounding water bodies ==
Lake Sacajawea, named for Sacajawea, is formed behind the dam. The lake stretches to the base of Lower Monumental Dam, 32 miles (51 km) upstream. The Wallula Channel, formed from the backup of Snake River entering the Columbia River just southeast of Pasco, runs ten miles (16 km) downstream from the base of the dam.

Navigation lock

- Single-lift
- 86 feet (26 m) wide
- 675 feet (206 m) long

== Hydroelectric power capacity ==
Generator	Nameplate Capacity (MW)
1	90.0
2	90.0
3	90.0
4	111.0
5	111.0
6	111.0
Total	603.0

== Climate ==
The record for the highest temperature in Washington state, at 118 °F (47.8 °C), was tied at Ice Harbor Dam on August 5, 1961. The record, which was shared with Wahluke (118 °F (47.8 °C) in 1928), was eventually surpassed on June 29, 2021, when Hanford reached 120 °F (48.9 °C).

Climate data for Ice Harbor Dam, WA
Month	Jan	Feb	Mar	Apr	May	Jun	Jul	Aug	Sep	Oct	Nov	Dec	Year
Record high °F (°C)	67 (19)	74 (23)	81 (27)	94 (34)	100 (38)	110 (43)	112 (44)	118 (48)	100 (38)	89 (32)	78 (26)	68 (20)	118 (48)
Mean daily maximum °F (°C)	41.2 (5.1)	48.4 (9.1)	57.5 (14.2)	65.1 (18.4)	73.3 (22.9)	81.0 (27.2)	89.2 (31.8)	88.4 (31.3)	79.8 (26.6)	66.3 (19.1)	51.3 (10.7)	41.7 (5.4)	65.3 (18.5)
Mean daily minimum °F (°C)	27.4 (−2.6)	30.2 (−1.0)	34.8 (1.6)	40.5 (4.7)	47.5 (8.6)	54.2 (12.3)	59.9 (15.5)	59.2 (15.1)	50.8 (10.4)	41.3 (5.2)	34.4 (1.3)	28.5 (−1.9)	42.4 (5.8)
Record low °F (°C)	−14 (−26)	−14 (−26)	13 (−11)	22 (−6)	28 (−2)	38 (3)	44 (7)	38 (3)	27 (−3)	17 (−8)	6 (−14)	−14 (−26)	−14 (−26)
Average precipitation inches (mm)	1.26 (32)	0.92 (23)	0.98 (25)	0.80 (20)	0.95 (24)	0.79 (20)	0.24 (6.1)	0.41 (10)	0.45 (11)	0.82 (21)	1.33 (34)	1.42 (36)	10.37 (262.1)
Average snowfall inches (cm)	2.5 (6.4)	0.9 (2.3)	0.1 (0.25)	0 (0)	0 (0)	0 (0)	0 (0)	0 (0)	0 (0)	0 (0)	0.2 (0.51)	1.6 (4.1)	5.3 (13.56)
Source: https://wrcc.dri.edu/cgi-bin/cliMAIN.pl?wa3883

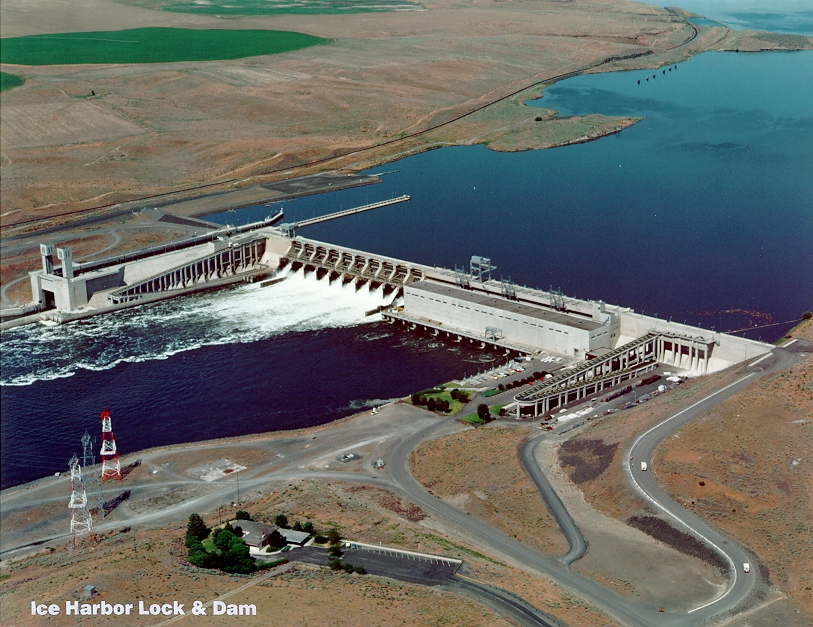
Looking north, Ice Harbor Dam with lock and one fish ladder on the left (north side of the river), spillway in the middle of the dam, and the power generation station and another fish ladder on the south side (right) of the river.

== Northwest Infrastructure Proposal ==
Since 2019 Representative Mike Simpson (R), representing central and eastern Idaho, has been working on and presenting the $33 billion Columbia Basin Fund, as a way to restore the endangered Columbia-Snake basin salmon, including the Snake River sockeye salmon, and steelhead. The plan was released in February 2021. The ultimate goal of the plan is to remove or breach (partial removal) four dams on the lower Snake River. This would involve the Ice Harbor, Lower Granite Dam, Little Goose Dam, and the Lower Monumental Dam beginning with the farthest inland or Lower Granite Dam. The fund would include creating alternate energy plans that would have to be implemented and finished first before any dam removal. The plan has brought together an extensive coalition of organizations, local, state, national and international, as well as the Yakama Nation, Confederated Tribes of the Umatilla Indian Reservation, Shoshone-Bannock Tribe, and the Nez Perce Tribe, in a proposed Northwest State and Tribal Fish and Wildlife Council, in support of the plan.

The Bonneville Power Administration advocates for keeping the dams even though the power from the four dams are considered surplus. and others oppose as written. Opposition from 17 environmental groups is the proposed license extension to 35 years for the other dams in the Columbia Basin as well as a moratorium on salmon-related lawsuits.

Washington Governor Jay Inslee and Senator Patty Murray are in opposition stating that any proposal needs a "science-based," "community-driven" approach. The Whitehouse, through the White House Council on Environmental Quality, released two reports that looks at the possibility of dam removal. U.S. Representatives. Dan Newhouse, Cathy McMorris Rodgers, and Jaime Herrera Beutler, all from Washington, Cliff Bentz of Oregon, Russ Fulcher of Idaho, and Matt Rosendale of Montana, referred to the report as biased. More than $17 billion has been spent on the recovery of the fish since they were classified as endangered species in 1991 but the efforts to reach sustainable levels has been called a failure.

An association of river commercial groups commissioned a study concluded that dam removal would jeopardize already fragile local and regional economies and that the needed train and trucking increase would require up to $2 billion in road and rail improvements.

== See also ==
- List of dams in the Columbia River watershed
- Lower Granite Dam
- Little Goose Dam
- Lower Monumental Dam
