= List of dams and reservoirs in Idaho =

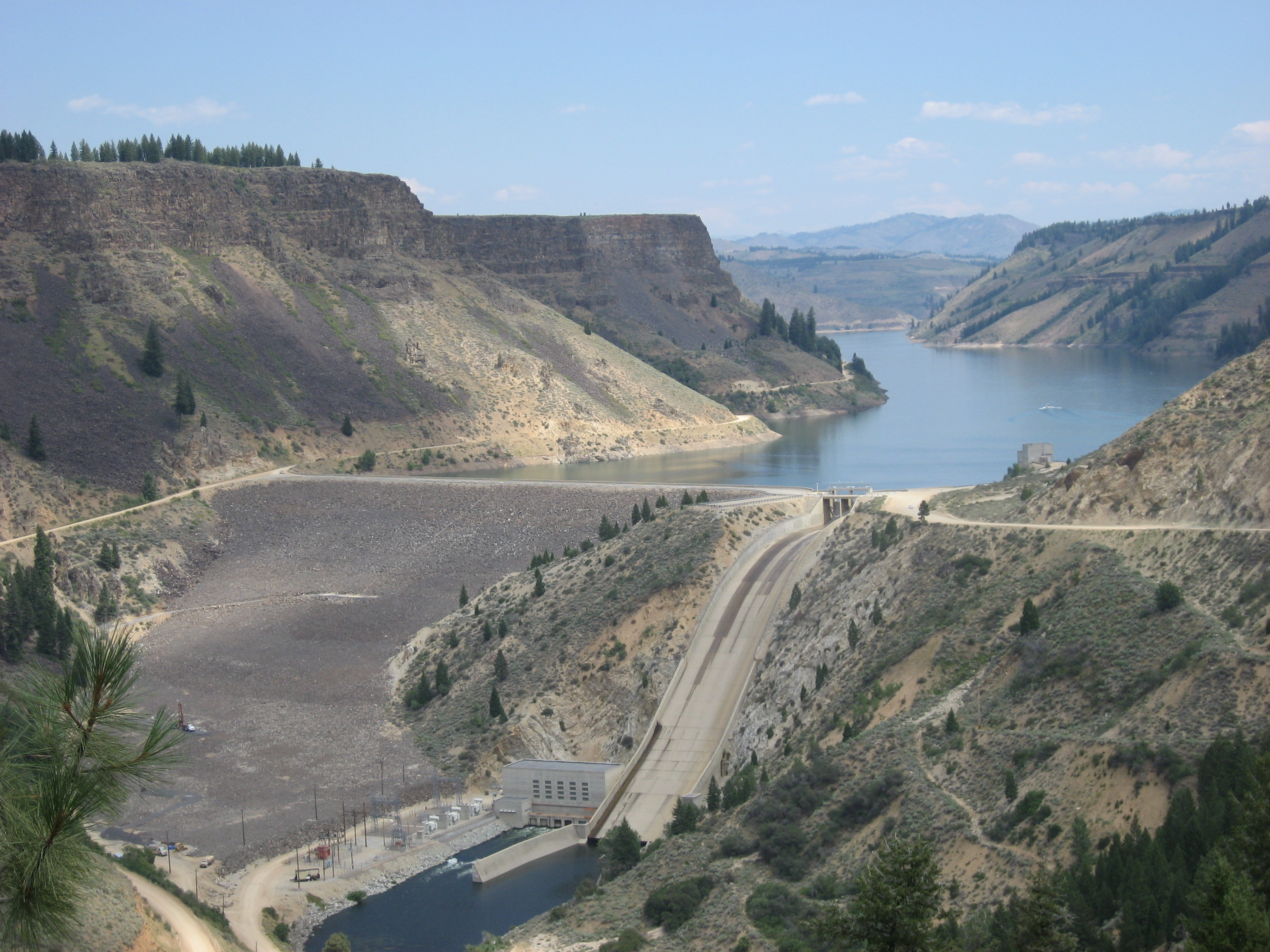
Anderson Ranch Dam, the 2nd highest dam in Idaho

This is a list of dams and reservoirs in the U.S. state of Idaho.

Key
†Located on state border	S=State of Idaho	USACE=U.S. Army Corps of Engineers	USBR=U.S. Bureau of Reclamation

Name	River	Type	Height		Reservoir	Capacity		Capacity	Owner	Built
			Ft	m		acre.ft	km^{3}	MW		
Albeni Falls Dam	Pend Oreille River	Concrete gravity	90	27	Lake Pend Oreille	1,153,000	1.422	?	USACE	1955
Alexander Dam	Bear River	Concrete gravity	94	29	Alexander Reservoir	15,760	0.01944	14	PacifiCorp	1925
American Falls Dam	Snake River	Concrete gravity	94	29	American Falls Reservoir	1,671,300	2.0615	112	USBR	1978
Anderson Ranch Dam	South Fork Boise River	Earthfill	456	139	Anderson Ranch Reservoir	503,500	0.6211	40	USBR	1950
Black Canyon Diversion Dam	Payette River	Concrete gravity	183	56	Black Canyon Reservoir	31,200	0.0385	10	USBR	1924
Arrowrock Dam	Boise River	Concrete arch	350	110	Arrowrock Reservoir	300,850	0.37109	0	USBR	1915
Blackfoot Dam	Blackfoot River	Earthfill	55	17	Blackfoot Reservoir	417,000	0.514	0	Idaho Bureau of Indian Affairs	1911
Bliss Dam	Snake River	Concrete gravity	70	21	Bliss Reservoir	11,000	0.014	75	Idaho Power	1950
Brownlee Dam†	Snake River	Earthfill	420	130	Brownlee Reservoir	1,426,700	1.7598	585.4	Idaho Power	1958
C. J. Strike Dam	Snake River	Earthfill	115	35	C. J. Strike Reservoir	247,000	0.305	82.8	Idaho Power	1952
Cabinet Gorge Dam	Clark Fork	Concrete arch	111	34	Cabinet Gorge Reservoir	106,000	0.131	231	Avista Utilities	1953
Cascade Dam	North Fork Payette River	Earthfill	107	33	Lake Cascade	693,100	0.8549	12.4	USBR	1948
Cedar Creek Dam	Cedar Creek	Earthfill	84	26	Cedar Creek Reservoir	30,000	0.037	0	Cedar Mesa Canal & Reservoir Co.	1920
Crane Creek Dam	Crane Creek	Earthfill	55	17	Crane Creek Reservoir	56,800	0.0701	?	Crane Creek Reservoir Administrative Board	1912
Deadwood Dam	Deadwood River	Concrete arch	165	50	Deadwood Reservoir	154,000	0.190	0	USBR	1931
Dworshak Dam	North Fork Clearwater River	Concrete gravity	717	219	Dworshak Reservoir	3,468,000	4.278	460	USACE	1973
Fish Creek Dam	Fish Creek	Concrete multiple arch	88	27	Fish Creek Reservoir	12,743	0.015718	0	Carey Valley Reservoir Co.	1923
Hells Canyon Dam†	Snake River	Concrete gravity	330	100	Hells Canyon Reservoir	188,000	0.232	391	Idaho Power	1967
Island Park Dam	Henrys Fork	Earthfill	94	29	Island Park Reservoir	135,205	0.166773	0	USBR	1939
Little Camas Dam	Little Camas Creek	Earthfill	44	13	Little Camas Reservoir	18,400	0.0227	0	Mountain Home Irrigation District	1912
Little Wood River Dam	Little Wood River	Earthfill	169	52	Little Wood River Reservoir	33,300	0.0411	3	USBR	1939
Lucky Peak Dam	Boise River	Earthfill	340	100	Lucky Peak Lake	307,000	0.379	101	USACE	1955
Mackay Dam	Big Lost River	Earthfill	67	20	Mackay Reservoir	45,000	0.056	0	Big Lost River Irrigation District	1918
Magic Dam	Big Wood River	Earthfill	128	39	Magic Reservoir	195,000	0.241	9	Magic Reservoir Hydroelectric, Inc.	1910
McArthur Lake	Deep Creek	Earthfill			McArthur Lake				Idaho Fish and Game	1942
Milner Dam	Snake River	Rockfill	73	22	Milner Lake	36,300	0.0448	58.3	Milner Dam, Inc.	1905
Minidoka Dam	Snake River	Earthfill/concrete	86	26	Lake Walcott	210,200	0.2593	28	USBR	1906
Mormon Dam	McKinney Creek	Earthfill	23	7.0	Mormon Reservoir	19,280	0.02378	0	Twin Lakes Reservoir & Irrigation Co.	1908
Oakley Dam	Goose Creek	Earthfill	139	42	Lower Goose Creek Reservoir	76,000	0.094	0	Oakley Canal Co.	1916
Oneida Dam	Bear River	Concrete gravity	102	31	Oneida Narrows Reservoir	11,400	0.0141	30	PacifiCorp	1913
Paddock Valley Dam	Little Willow Creek	Earthfill	43	13	Paddock Valley Reservoir	36,400	0.0449	0	Little Willow Irrigation District	1949
Ririe Dam	Willow Creek	Earthfill	253	77	Ririe Reservoir	100,500	0.1240	0	USBR	1977
Oxbow Dam†	Snake River	Rockfill	175	53	Oxbow Reservoir	58,200	0.0718	190	Idaho Power	1961
Palisades Dam	Snake River	Earthfill	270	82	Palisades Reservoir	1,200,000	1.5	176.5	USBR	1957
Post Falls Dam	Spokane River	Concrete gravity	57.8	17.6	Coeur d'Alene Lake	225,000	0.278	14.75	Avista Utilities	1906
Priest Lake Dam	Priest River	Concrete gravity	8	2.4	Priest Lake	143,000	0.176	?	Idaho Department of Water Resources	1978
Sage Hen Dam	Sage Hen Creek	Earthfill	38	12	Sage Hen Reservoir	5,210	0.00643	0	Squaw Creek Irrigation Company	1938
Salmon Falls Dam	Salmon Falls Creek	Concrete arch	217	66	Salmon Falls Creek Reservoir	230,650	0.28450	0	Salmon River Canal Co.	1911

== See also ==
- List of lakes of Idaho
- List of dams in the Columbia River watershed
- List of dam removals in Idaho
