= Blackfoot (disambiguation) =

The Blackfoot Confederacy is a confederacy of indigenous peoples in Canada and the United States.

Blackfoot or Blackfeet may also refer to:

== Places ==
=== Canada ===
- Blackfoot, Alberta
- Blackfoot diatreme, a volcanic pipe in British Columbia, Canada

=== United States ===
- Blackfoot, Idaho
- Blackfoot, Montana
- Blackfoot, Texas
- Blackfoot Creek, a stream in South Dakota
- Blackfoot Glacier, in Montana
- Blackfoot Mountain, in Montana
- Blackfoot Mountains, in Idaho
- Blackfoot River (disambiguation)
- Blackfoot Dam

== Other uses ==
- Blackfoot language, an Algonquian language spoken by the Blackfoot people
- Blackfeet Nation, a Native American tribe in Montana
- Blackfoot Sioux, or Sihasapa, a people unrelated to the Blackfoot Confederacy
- Blackfoot (band), an American rock band
- Black foot disease of grapevine, a plant disease
- Blackfoot, a fictional character in the Warriors novel series
- J. Blackfoot (1946–2011), American soul singer
- J. D. Blackfoot (born 1944), an American rock musician
- Melampodium, or blackfoots, a genus of flowering plants in the sunflower family
- Pied-Noir ('Black Feet'), people of French or European origin born in Algeria during French rule 1830–1962
- Tamiya Blackfoot, a radio-controlled model truck

== See also ==
- Gangrene, a type of tissue death that may change skin black
