= McArthur Lake Wildlife Management Area =

Protected area in Idaho, United States

- IUCN category IV (habitat/species management area)
- Location within Idaho
- Location: Bonner and Boundary counties, Idaho, United States
- Nearest city: Sandpoint, ID
- Coordinates: 48°30′49″N 116°26′59″W
- Area: 1,207 acres (4.9 km^{2})
- Established: 1942
- Governing body: Idaho Department of Fish and Game
- Website: fishandgame.idaho.gov/IFWIS/ibt/site.aspx?id=N7

McArthur Lake Wildlife Management Area at 1,207 acres (4.88 km^{2}) is an Idaho wildlife management area in Bonner and Boundary counties located between Sandpoint and Bonners Ferry. It was established in 1942 to protect and enhance waterfowl habitat. It lies within the McArthur Lake Wildlife Corridor.

The WMA includes the riparian zones around McArthur Lake that provide a variety of wildlife, including moose, elk, beaver, and river otters with habitat and food. White-tailed deer and Canada geese are abundant, and hunting is permitted.
