= Little Wood Dam =

Dam on the Little Wood River in Blaine County, Idaho, United States

Coordinates: 43°25′35″N 114°01′36″W

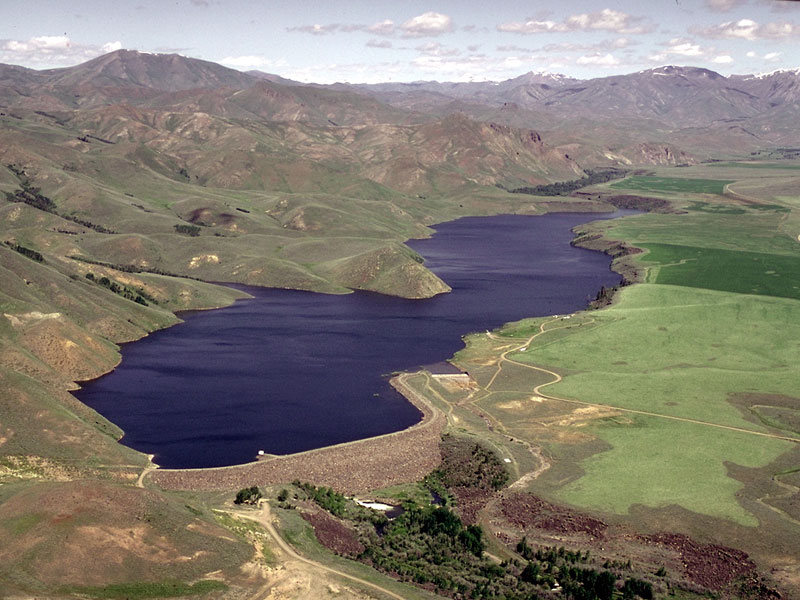
Little Wood River Dam, January 2010

Little Wood Dam (National Inventory of Dams ID ID00041), also known as the Little Wood River Dam, is a dam on the Little Wood River in central Blaine County, Idaho, United States, about 10 miles (16 km) miles northwest of Carey.

== Description ==
The earthen dam was originally constructed from 1936 to 1939 by the United States Bureau of Reclamation as a flood control and irrigation storage project, then modified in 1960. The dam impounds the Little Wood River, is 129 feet (39 m) tall, and is 3,100 feet (940 m) long at its crest. The 1960 modification included the installation of a one-unit hydroelectric power plant that generates three megawatts. The dam is owned by the Bureau and is operated by the local Little Wood River Irrigation District. The reservoir it creates, Little Wood River Reservoir, has a maximum capacity of 30,000 acre-feet (37,000,000 m^{3}) and about 9 miles (14 km) of shoreline. Recreation includes fishing (for rainbow, cutthroat, and brook trout), hunting, boating, camping and hiking.

== See also ==
- List of dams and reservoirs in Idaho
