= Rogerson, Idaho =

Unincorporated community in the state of Idaho, United States

- Unincorporated community
- Location within the state of Idaho Location within the United States
- Coordinates: 42°13′05″N 114°35′39″W
- Country: United States
- State: Idaho
- County: Twin Falls
- Elevation: 4,899 ft (1,493 m)
- Time zone: UTC-7 (Mountain (MST))
  - Summer (DST): UTC-6 (MDT)
- GNIS feature ID: 374764

Rogerson is an unincorporated community in Twin Falls County, Idaho, United States. It is located approximately 18 miles (30 kilometers) north of the Nevada border on U.S. Route 93, about seven miles (11.3 km) east of Salmon Falls Dam. Rogerson had a post office 1910-1961.

Rogerson is part of the Twin Falls, Idaho Metropolitan Statistical Area.
