= Blackfoot River =

Blackfoot River can refer to:

- Blackfoot River (Idaho)
- Blackfoot River (Montana)
- Little Blackfoot River, also in Montana
