= Salmon Falls Dam =

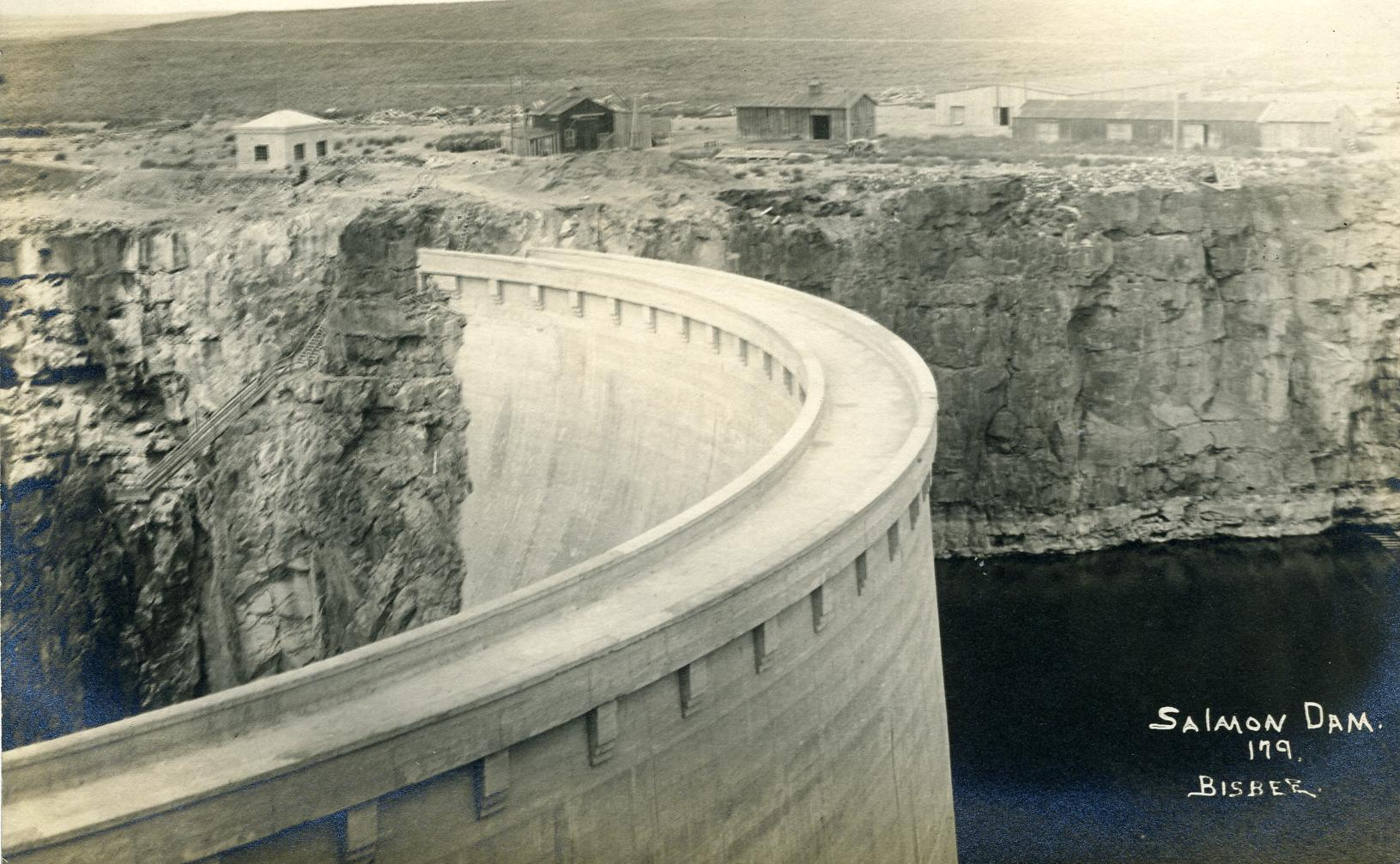
- Salmon Falls Dam shortly after completion in 1910

- Location in Idaho Location in United States
- Country: United States
- Location: Twin Falls County, Idaho
- Coordinates: 42°12′43″N 114°44′04″W
- Purpose: Irrigation
- Opening date: 1910
- Owner: Salmon River Canal Company

Dam and spillways
- Type of dam: Concrete gravity arch
- Impounds: Salmon Falls Creek
- Height: 217 ft (66 m)
- Length: 450 ft (140 m)

Reservoir
- Creates: Salmon Falls Creek Reservoir
- Total capacity: 230,650 acre⋅ft (284,500 dam^{3})
- Catchment area: 1,610 mi^{2} (4,200 km^{2})
- Surface area: 3,400 acres (1,400 ha)
- Maximum length: 14 mi (23 km)
- Normal elevation: 5,010 ft (1,527 m)

Salmon Falls Dam is a dam constructed across Salmon Falls Creek in Twin Falls County, Idaho, in the United States. Located about 28 miles (45 km) southwest of Twin Falls, the concrete arch dam is 217 feet (66 m) high and 450 feet (140 m) long, impounding up to 230,650 acre-feet (0.28450 km^{3}) of water in Salmon Falls Creek Reservoir. When full, the reservoir extends for 17 miles (27 km) upstream, encompassing 3,400 acres (1,400 ha). The dam and reservoir control runoff from a drainage basin of 1,610 mi^{2} (4,200 km^{2}).

The dam was built in 1910 to provide irrigation water storage, and is owned and operated by the Salmon River Canal Company. A secondary purpose is flood control: the dam has spilled floodwaters twice, in 1984 and 2017. Salmon Falls Creek Reservoir is also a popular recreational lake, and is considered one of the best fisheries in southern Idaho.

The dam was the third-largest dam in the world at the time of its construction. It was part of a major reclamation effort which partly failed due to less water being available than planned, and partly due to unexpected leakage of water through the lava rock used in the dam's construction.

The Salmon Falls Tract, the associated reclamation project, was originally termed the Salmon River Tract, and the dam was named the Salmon Dam. That naming "was chosen over Salmon Falls because the project promoters believed it had more appeal, although the dam’s name was changed back to Salmon Falls".

== Historic site ==
- Salmon Falls Dam
- U.S. National Register of Historic Places
- Nearest city: Rogerson, Idaho
- Area: 10 acres (4.0 ha)
- Built: 1908–1910
- Engineer: Andrew J. Wiley
- Architectural style: Concrete Arch Dam
- NRHP reference No.: 09000328
- Added to NRHP: May 15, 2009

The Salmon Falls Dam was listed on the National Register of Historic Places in 2009. The listing included a contributing building and six contributing structures in addition to the dam itself, on 10 acres (4.0 ha). The dam's engineer was Andrew J. Wiley. The historic listing includes the dam, one building, and seven other structures.

== Gallery ==
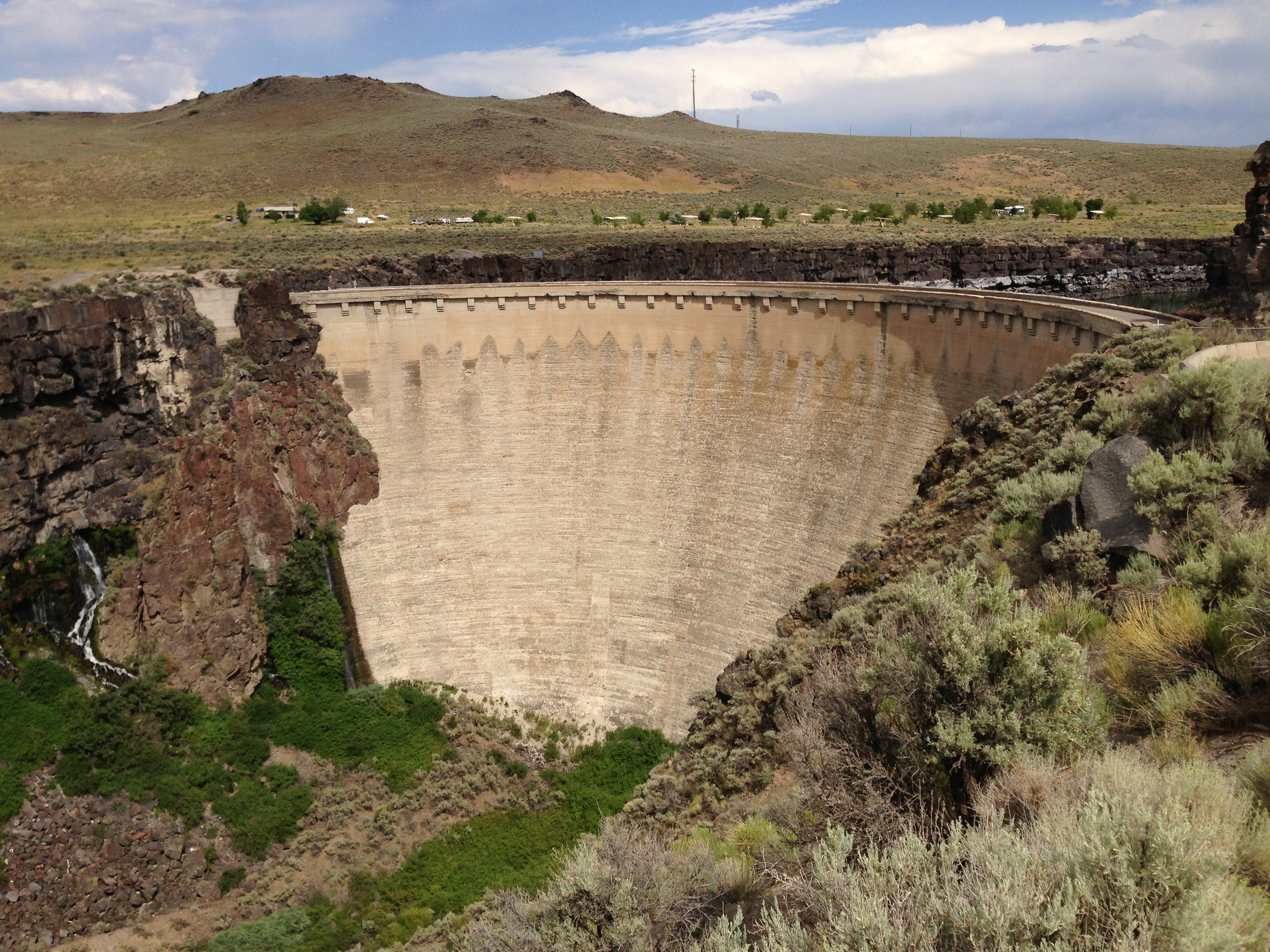
Salmon Falls Creek Dam viewed from the west

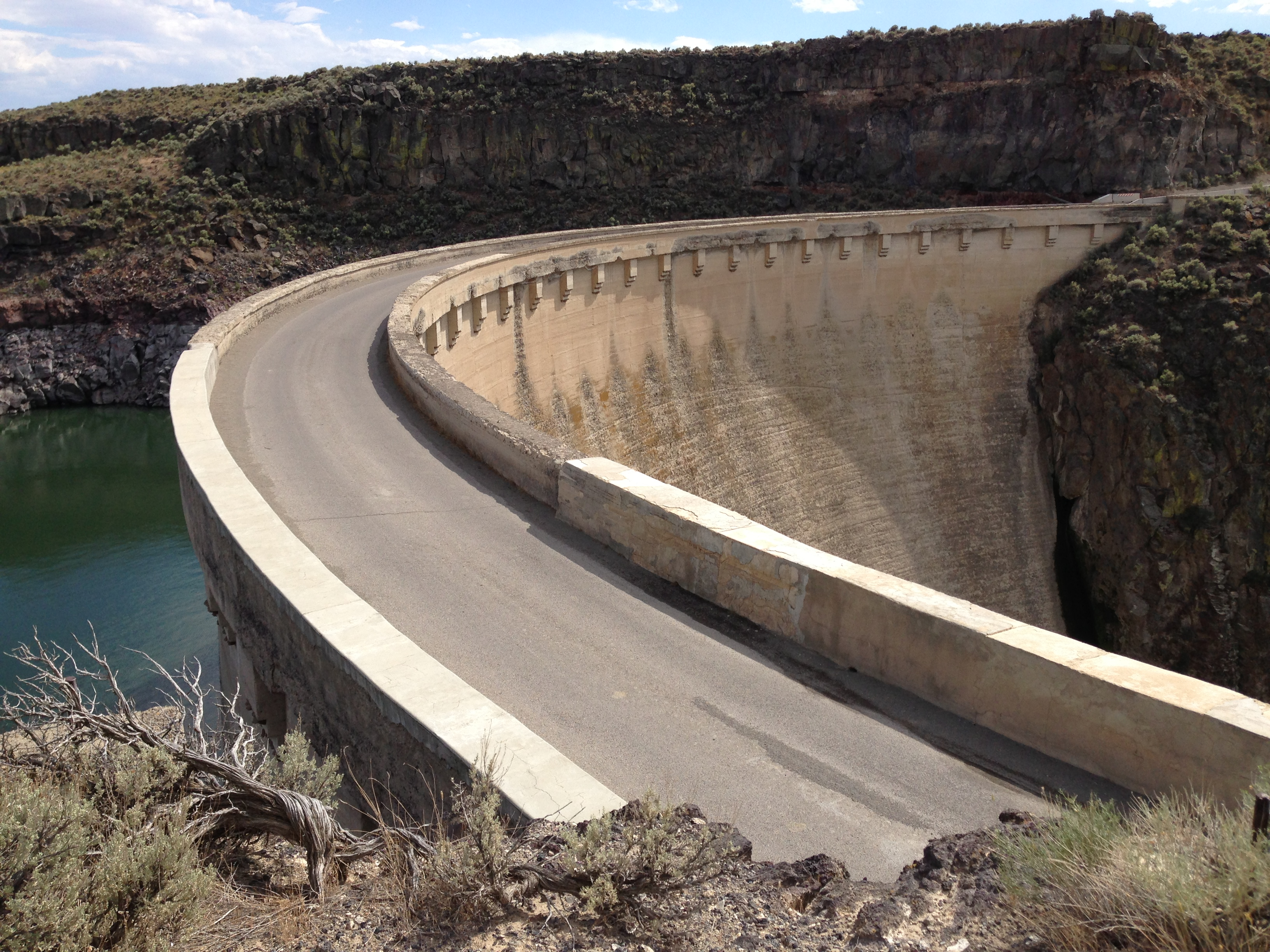
Salmon Falls Creek Dam viewed from the east

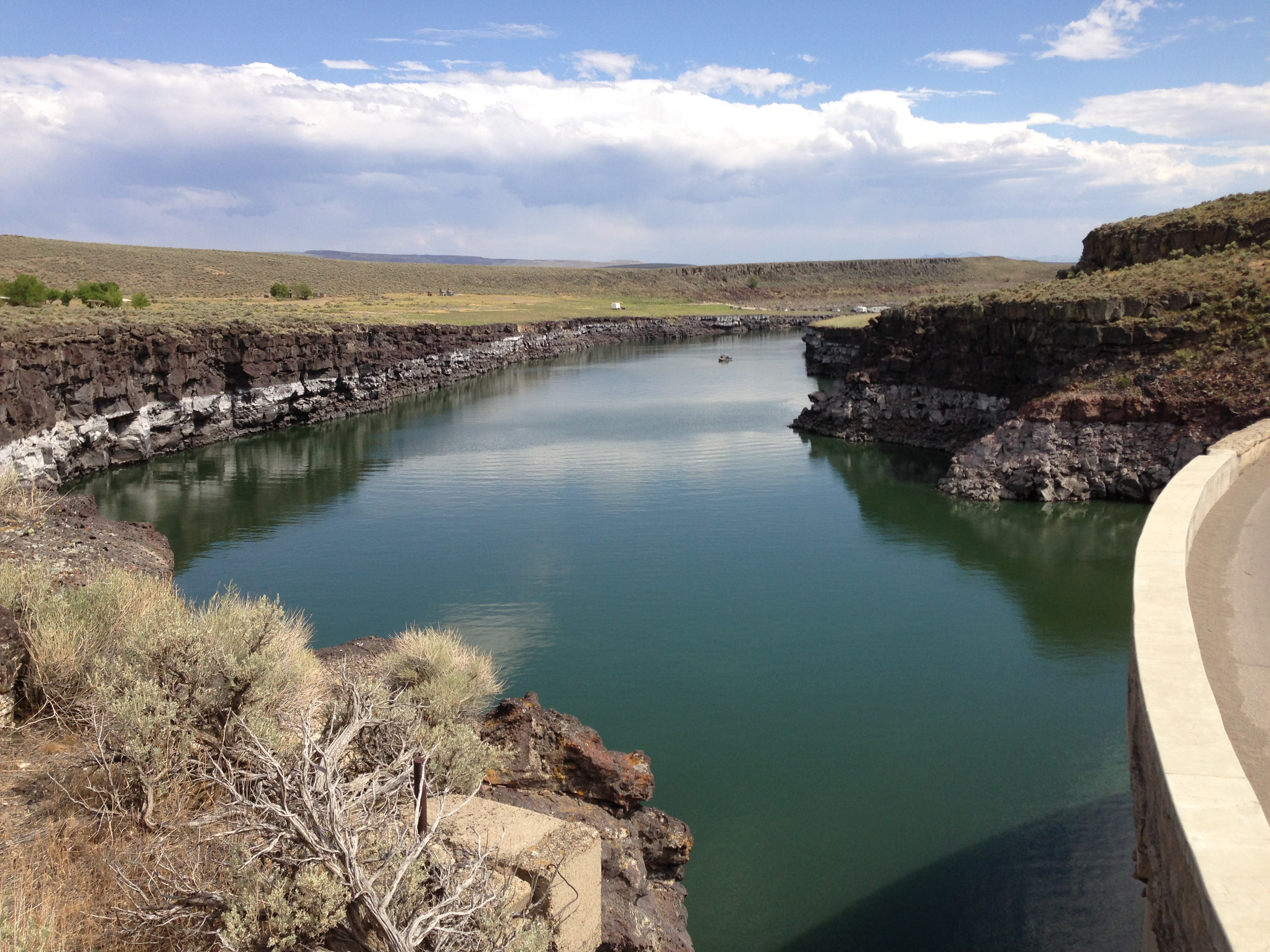
View south up the Salmon Falls Creek Reservoir from the east end of the Salmon Falls Creek Dam

== See also ==
- List of dams and reservoirs in Idaho
