= Diatreme =

Volcanic pipe associated with a gaseous explosion

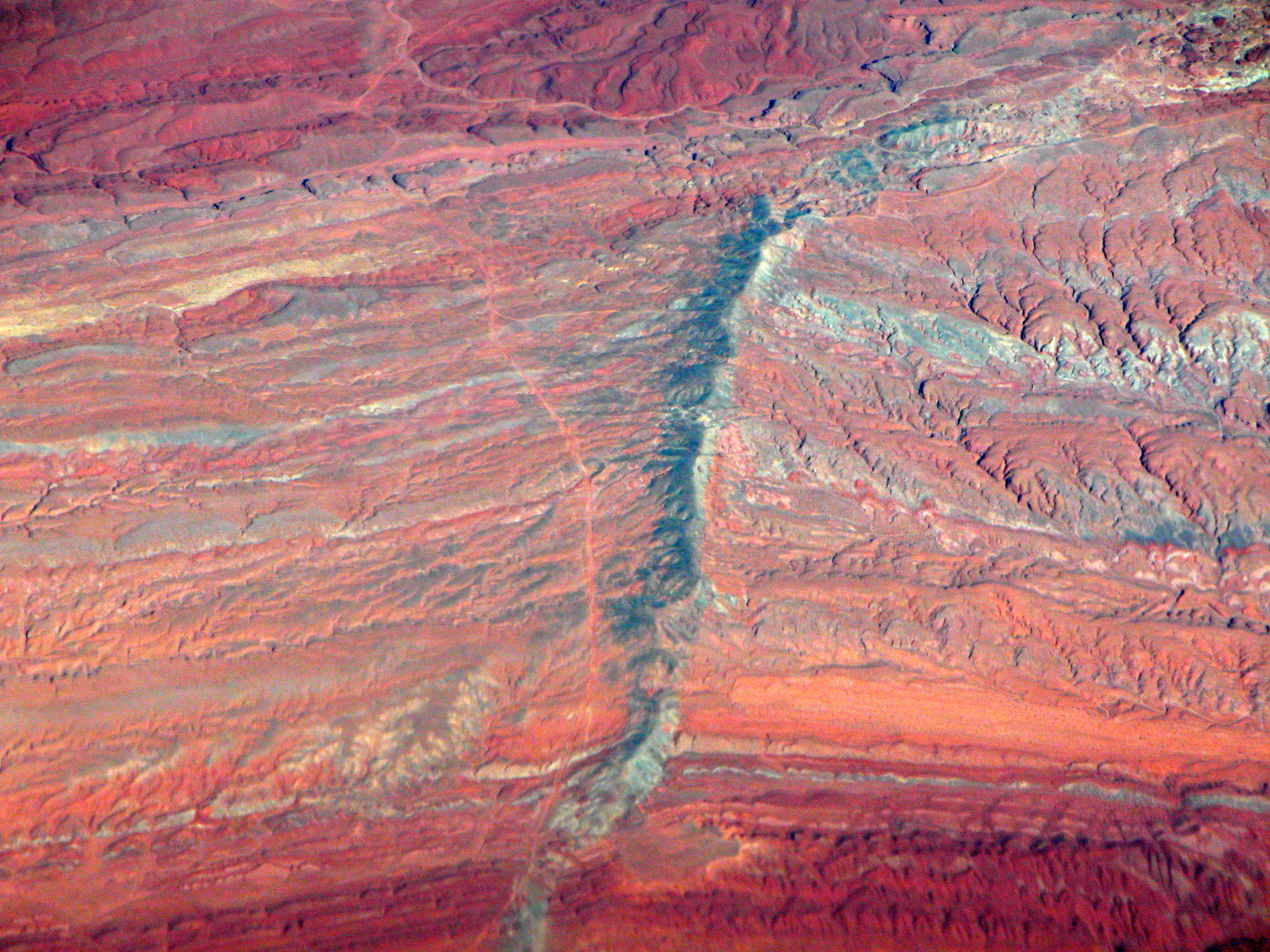
Aerial view of the Moses Rock Dike diatreme in San Juan County, Utah

A diatreme, sometimes known as a maar-diatreme volcano, is a volcanic pipe associated with a gaseous explosion. When magma rises up through a crack in Earth's crust and makes contact with a shallow body of groundwater, rapid expansion of heated water vapor and volcanic gases can cause a series of explosions. A relatively shallow crater (known as a maar) is left, and a rock-filled fracture (the actual diatreme) in the crust. Where diatremes breach the surface they produce a steep, inverted cone shape.

== Etymology and geology ==
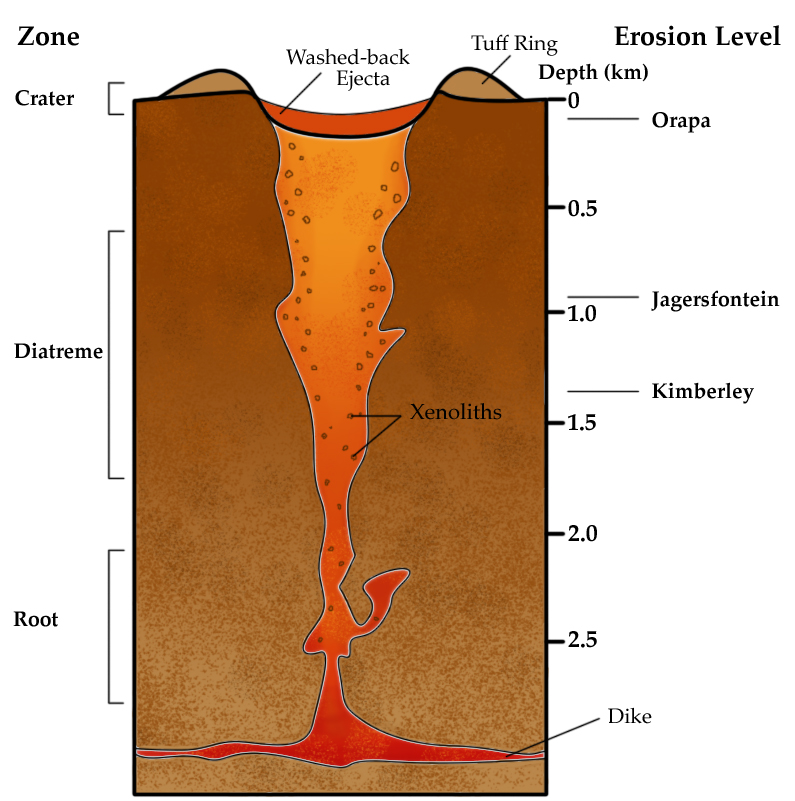
An illustration using a mix of common and geological terms of a diatreme. The crater and tuff terms are usually combined into the term maar, and maar is often combined into the term diatreme (see text for definitions) rather than diatreme excluding the maar.

The word comes from Ancient Greek δία- (dia-) 'through, across, over' and τρῆμα (trêma) 'hole, aperture'. The term diatreme has been applied more generally to any concave body of broken rock formed by explosive or hydrostatic forces, whether or not it is related to volcanism. Even within volcanology, the term has been used more generally by some than others, and in kimberlite terminology continues to be contentious. A current geological understanding is that diatreme describes the overall structure cut into the substrate (some have used the term “pipe” for this hence the common term volcanic pipe). In a simple diatreme, the structure narrows fairly regularly with depth and eventually terminates in the dike (dyke), or part of a dike, that fed the eruption. The transition from diatreme to dike occurs in a “root zone” that is the lowest part of the diatreme structure, immediately above the dike, which comprises coherent igneous rock. Maar-diatreme volcanoes are volcanoes produced by explosive eruptions that cut deeply into the country rock, with the maar being "the crater cut into the ground and surrounded by an ejecta ring".

== Global distribution ==
Maar-diatreme volcanoes are not uncommon, reported as the second most common type of volcano on continents and islands. At the surface they may be hard to recognise if shallow and dry or eroded and can be up to 3 kilometres (1.9 mi) wide, but are often much smaller.

Igneous extrusions cause the formation of a diatreme only in the specific setting where groundwater exists; thus most igneous intrusions do not produce diatremes as they do not reach the surface so as to become extrusions, and further do not also intercept significant amount of groundwater when they become extrusions.

Examples of diatremes include the Blackfoot diatreme and Cross diatreme in British Columbia, Canada.

== Economic importance ==
Diatremes are sometimes associated with deposition of economically significant mineral deposits such as kimberlite magma, which originates in the upper mantle. When a diatreme is formed due to a kimberlite intrusion, there is a possibility that diamonds may be brought up, as diamonds are formed in the upper mantle at depths of 150-200 kilometers. Kimberlite magmas can sometimes include chunks of diamond as xenoliths, making them economically significant.
