= Bone, Idaho =

Unincorporated community in the state of Idaho, United States

- Unincorporated community
- Location within Idaho Location within the United States
- Coordinates: 43°18′45″N 111°47′43″W
- Country: United States
- State: Idaho
- County: Bonneville
- Elevation: 6,073 ft (1,851 m)

Population (2006)
  - Total: 2
- Time zone: UTC-7 (Mountain (MST))
  - Summer (DST): UTC-6 (MDT)
- Area codes: 208, 986
- GNIS feature ID: 396161

Bone is an unincorporated community in Bonneville County, Idaho, United States. Bone is located near the Bingham County line and Willow Creek 17 miles (27 km) southeast of Idaho Falls. As of 2006, the community had two permanent residents and one business, the Bone Store; its population increases during ranching season. The store closed in 2017, but opened in 2020 under new management and a new name.

== History ==
Bone was founded by Orion Yost Bone, who opened the first Bone Store in the early 1900s. The original store burned down in 1945 and was rebuilt by Max Rockwood (long time Bone resident and rancher) and relocated approximately 150 yds to the north. Bone was the last community in Idaho to receive telephone service, which it did not get until 1982.

== Climate ==
Idaho Falls 16 SE is a nearby weather station 2.4 miles (3.9 km) north of Bone.

Climate data for Idaho Falls 16 SE, Idaho, 1991–2020 normals, 1960-2020 extremes: 5828ft (1776m)
Month	Jan	Feb	Mar	Apr	May	Jun	Jul	Aug	Sep	Oct	Nov	Dec	Year
Record high °F (°C)	52 (11)	60 (16)	68 (20)	80 (27)	90 (32)	97 (36)	100 (38)	99 (37)	92 (33)	82 (28)	70 (21)	56 (13)	100 (38)
Mean maximum °F (°C)	43.1 (6.2)	46.6 (8.1)	58.2 (14.6)	70.5 (21.4)	78.7 (25.9)	85.9 (29.9)	90.4 (32.4)	90.4 (32.4)	84.6 (29.2)	74.1 (23.4)	59.5 (15.3)	46.3 (7.9)	92.1 (33.4)
Mean daily maximum °F (°C)	30.7 (−0.7)	33.9 (1.1)	42.3 (5.7)	51.2 (10.7)	61.8 (16.6)	70.7 (21.5)	80.9 (27.2)	79.4 (26.3)	69.6 (20.9)	55.5 (13.1)	41.1 (5.1)	30.3 (−0.9)	54.0 (12.2)
Daily mean °F (°C)	22.3 (−5.4)	24.6 (−4.1)	32.9 (0.5)	40.2 (4.6)	49.2 (9.6)	56.8 (13.8)	65.2 (18.4)	63.5 (17.5)	54.9 (12.7)	42.9 (6.1)	31.1 (−0.5)	21.7 (−5.7)	42.1 (5.6)
Mean daily minimum °F (°C)	13.9 (−10.1)	15.2 (−9.3)	23.6 (−4.7)	29.2 (−1.6)	36.7 (2.6)	42.9 (6.1)	49.5 (9.7)	47.7 (8.7)	40.1 (4.5)	30.3 (−0.9)	21.1 (−6.1)	13.2 (−10.4)	30.3 (−1.0)
Mean minimum °F (°C)	−11.1 (−23.9)	−9.8 (−23.2)	1.7 (−16.8)	13.1 (−10.5)	21.6 (−5.8)	30.0 (−1.1)	38.5 (3.6)	35.0 (1.7)	23.5 (−4.7)	10.5 (−11.9)	−1.7 (−18.7)	−12.8 (−24.9)	−18.7 (−28.2)
Record low °F (°C)	−51 (−46)	−40 (−40)	−24 (−31)	0 (−18)	7 (−14)	21 (−6)	28 (−2)	19 (−7)	7 (−14)	−19 (−28)	−25 (−32)	−42 (−41)	−51 (−46)
Average precipitation inches (mm)	1.78 (45)	1.16 (29)	1.39 (35)	1.64 (42)	2.17 (55)	1.37 (35)	0.85 (22)	0.89 (23)	1.38 (35)	1.41 (36)	1.40 (36)	1.88 (48)	17.32 (441)
Average snowfall inches (cm)	17.00 (43.2)	11.80 (30.0)	7.60 (19.3)	2.90 (7.4)	0.90 (2.3)	0.20 (0.51)	0.00 (0.00)	0.00 (0.00)	0.00 (0.00)	1.70 (4.3)	7.60 (19.3)	16.00 (40.6)	65.7 (166.91)
Source 1: NOAA
Source 2: XMACIS2 (records & monthly max/mins)
