= Willow Creek (Snake River tributary) =

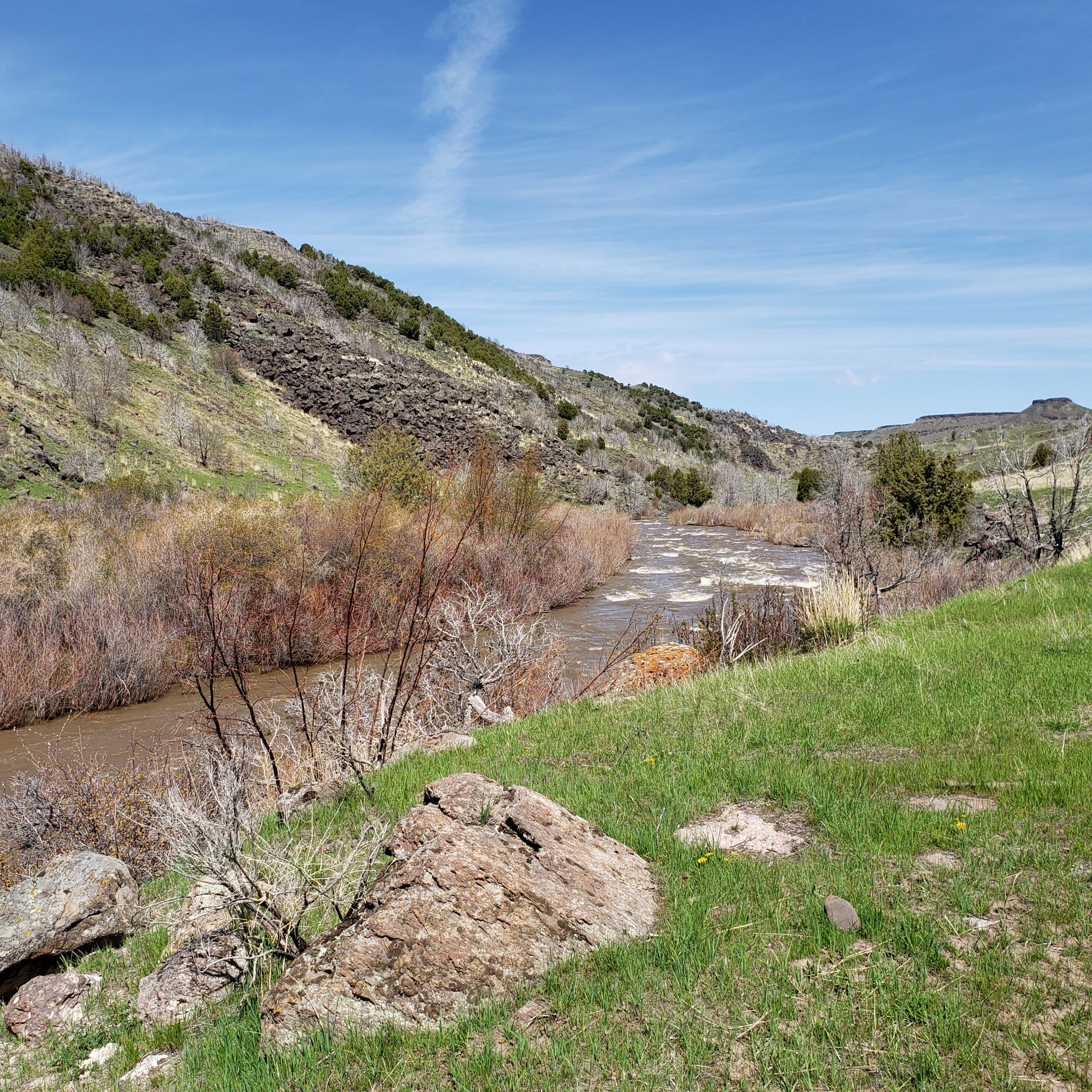
- Willow Creek, Bonneville County, Idaho, USA

- Location of the mouth of Willow Creek in Idaho

Location
- Country: United States
- State: Idaho
- Counties: Bonneville County, Idaho, Bingham County, Idaho

Physical characteristics
- Source
  - location: east of the Blackfoot Mountains, Bingham County, Idaho
  - coordinates: 43°05′40″N 111°42′52″W
  - elevation: 6,568 ft (2,002 m)
- Mouth: Snake River
  - location: north of Idaho Falls, Bonneville County, Idaho
  - coordinates: 43°33′10″N 111°59′17″W
  - elevation: 4,777 ft (1,456 m)
- Length: 84 mi (135 km)

Willow Creek is a 84-mile (135 km) long tributary of the Snake River in the U.S. state of Idaho. Beginning at an elevation of 6,568 feet (2,002 m) east of the Blackfoot Mountains in southeastern Bingham County, it flows generally north into Bonneville County and past Bone. South of the town of Ririe, the creek is impounded by Ririe Dam, forming Ririe Reservoir. It then turns southwest, passing between Iona and Ucon, before bifurcating into two distributaries, North Fork Willow Creek and South Fork Willow Creek, at an elevation of 4,777 feet (1,456 m). Both forks reach the Snake River north of Idaho Falls.

Willow Creek has significant populations of brown trout.

== See also ==
- List of rivers of Idaho
- List of longest streams of Idaho
