= Soda Dam =

- Location in Idaho Location in United States
- Country: United States
- Location: Caribou County, Idaho
- Coordinates: 42°38′41″N 111°41′47″W
- Purpose: hydroelectric power
- Opening date: 1925
- Operator: PacifiCorp

Dam and spillways
- Impounds: Bear River
- Height: 94 ft (29 m)
- Length: 492 ft (150 m)

Reservoir
- Creates: Alexander Reservoir
- Total capacity: 15,760 acre⋅ft (0.01944 km^{3})
- Active capacity: 15,200 acre⋅ft (0.0187 km^{3})
- Surface area: 1.9 sq mi (4.9 km^{2})
- Normal elevation: 5,722 ft (1,744 m)

Soda Dam, also known as Alexander Dam (National Inventory of Dams ID ID00060), is a dam in Caribou County, Idaho, directly west of the town of Soda Springs.

The concrete dam was originally constructed in 1925, with a current height of 94 feet (29 m) and a length of 492 feet (150 m) at its crest, since a 1991 re-construction. It impounds Bear River for hydroelectric power, one of the hydropower facilities owned and operated by the electric utility PacifiCorp.

The reservoir it creates, Alexander Reservoir, has a normal water surface of 1.9 square miles (4.9 km^{2}), a maximum capacity of 15,760 acre-feet, and a normal capacity of 15,200 acre-feet. Recreation includes fishing, canoeing, and birdwatching.
