= Black Canyon Diversion Dam =

Dam in Gem County, Idaho, US

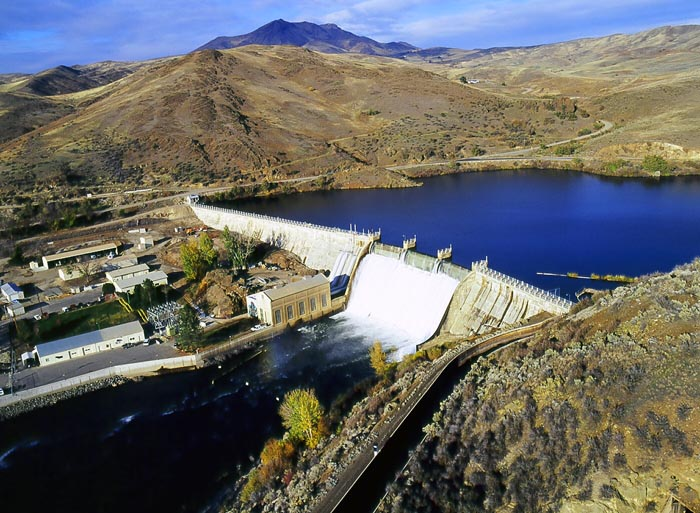

- Location within Idaho
- Country: United States
- Coordinates: 43°55′50″N 116°26′11″W
- Purpose: Power
- Status: Operational
- Construction began: 1922
- Opening date: 1924
- Built by: United States Bureau of Reclamation
- Owner: Bureau of Reclamation
- Operator: Bureau of Reclamation

Dam and spillways
- Type of dam: Gravity dam
- Impounds: Payette River
- Height (foundation): 183 feet (56 m)
- Height (thalweg): 112 feet (34 m)
- Length: 1,902 feet (580 m)
- Elevation at crest: 2,500 feet (760 m)
- Dam volume: 81,200 cubic yards (62,100 m^{3})
- Spillway type: Ogee crest controlled by three 64-foot-long steel drum gates
- Spillway capacity: 41,240 cubic feet per second (1,168 m^{3}/s)

Reservoir
- Creates: Black Canyon Reservoir
- Total capacity: 31,200 acre-feet (38,500,000 m^{3})
- Surface area: 1.7 square miles (4.4 km^{2})

Power Station
- Type: Conventional
- Turbines: 2 Francis turbines
- Installed capacity: 10.2 MW
- Capacity factor: 70.8

Black Canyon Diversion Dam (National Inventory of Dams ID ID00282) is a dam in Gem County, Idaho.

The concrete dam was originally completed in 1924, then re-constructed between 1951 and 1955, by the United States Bureau of Reclamation. Its structure has a height of 183 feet (56 m), and a length of 1,902 feet (580 m) at its crest. It impounds the Payette River for the diversion of water into the Black Canyon and North Side Main irrigation canals, and the generation of about 2 megawatts of hydroelectric power, part of the Bureau's larger Boise Project. The dam is owned and operated by the Bureau.

The riverine reservoir it creates, the Black Canyon Reservoir, has a normal water surface of 1.7 square miles (4.4 km^{2}), about twelve miles of shoreline, and an original maximum capacity of 44,700 acre-feet, reduced by siltation to about 31,200 acre-feet. Recreation includes boating and fishing. The installation of a third hydropower generating unit has been funded by Bonneville Power Administration for completion in 2013.
