= Cross diatreme =

Diatreme in southeastern British Columbia, Canada

Highest point
- Elevation: 2,200 m (7,200 ft)
- Coordinates: 50°5′25″N 114°49′30″W

Geography
- Location: British Columbia, Canada
- Parent range: Canadian Rockies

Geology
- Mountain type: Diatreme

The Cross diatreme is a diatreme in southeastern British Columbia, Canada, located 60 km (37 mi) east of the Rocky Mountain Trench and 8 km (5 mi) northeast of Elkford.

== See also ==
- Volcanism in Canada
- List of volcanoes in Canada
