= Mackay Reservoir (Idaho) =

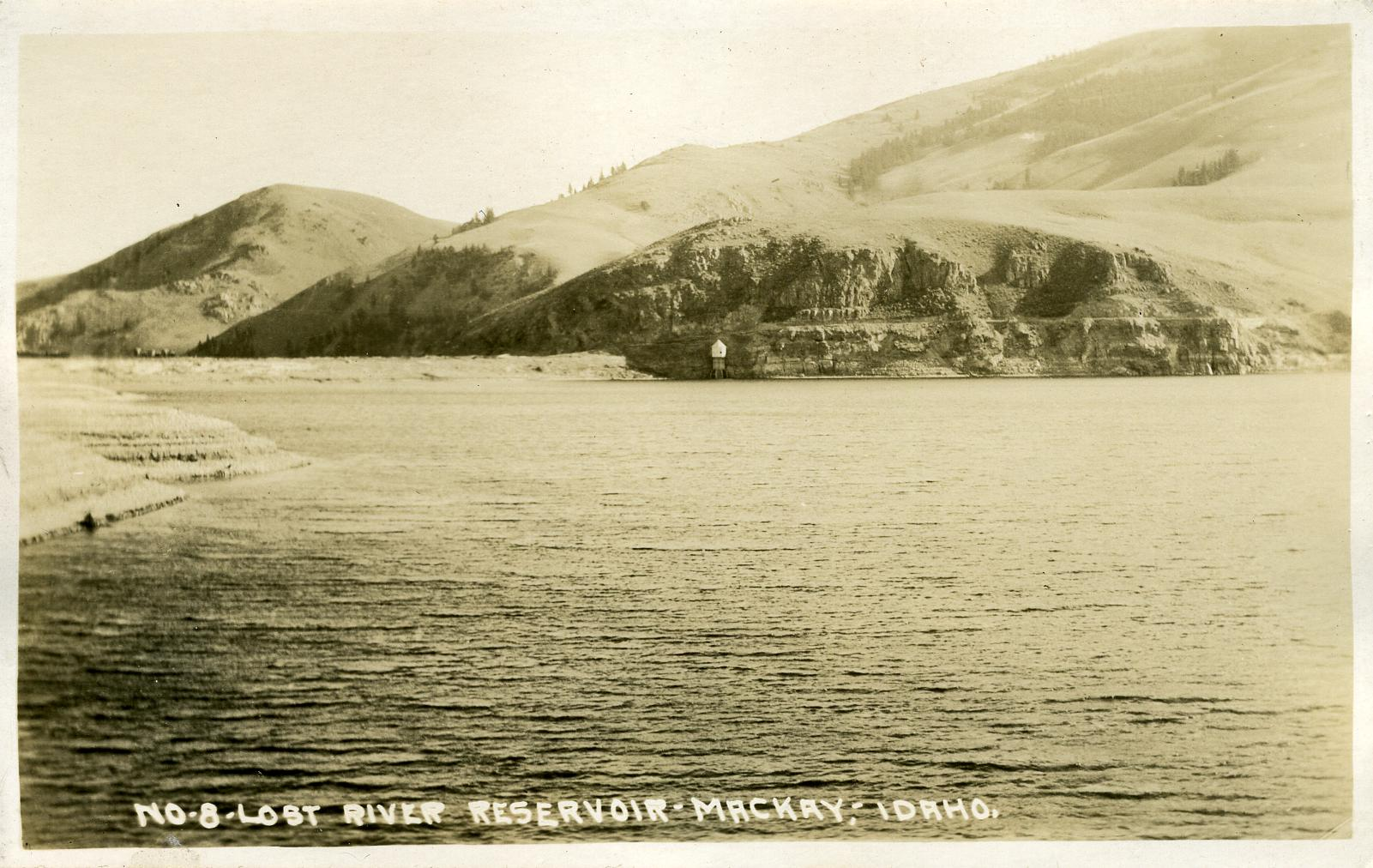
- Mackay Reservoir, c. 1920

- Location within Idaho Location within the United States
- Location: Custer County, Idaho; United States
- Coordinates: 43°57′11″N 113°40′27″W
- Type: reservoir
- Primary inflows: Big Lost River
- Primary outflows: Big Lost River
- Basin countries: United States
- Built: 1918
- Water volume: 45,000 acre-feet (56,000,000 m^{3})
- Surface elevation: 6,060 feet (1,850 m)

Mackay Reservoir is a reservoir on the Big Lost River in Custer County, Idaho, United States.

== Description ==
The reservoir is located in the Lost River Valley below the Lost River Range about 4 miles (6.4 km) northwest of Mackay. The land surrounding the reservoir offers opportunities for boating, fishing, camping, and hunting, among other activities. The reservoir is impounded by Mackay Dam, which was built in 1918 by the Big Lost River Irrigation District. U.S. Route 93 travel along the eastern side of the reservoir. The towns of Mackay and Arco put on a Fourth of July fireworks show at the reservoir every year.

== Details ==
The dam face is 67 feet (20 m) high. The reservoir covers 1,392 acres (563 ha) and has a storage capacity of 45,050 acre-feet (0.05557 km^{3}; 14.68×10^{9} US gal) of water. It is stocked annually with fish by the Idaho Department of Fish and Game. The reservoir sits between the Pioneer Mountains and the Lost River Range at the base of Mt. McCaleb.

== History ==
The dam was completed in 1918 by the Utah Construction Company. It served irrigation canals in the Lost River Valley. In June 1933, the control tower and diversions were attacked by "unknown persons" using dynamite. At the time, it was suspected that these residents and farmers were desperate for more water during the drought and thought the dam was to blame. The primary dam structure was undamaged. This prompted the owners, the Utah Construction Company, to drop its selling price on the dam, and in 1936, the town of Mackay purchased it under the Lost River Irrigation District. Since that time, Mackay has hosted an annual barbecue in the fall to celebrate the purchase of the reservoir, which residents fondly call "The Res". Mackay Reservoir survived the 1983 Borah Peak earthquake, despite extensive damage to the nearby towns of Mackay and Challis.

== Safety ==
In 2011 several environmentalist groups submitted a request for preventative action to Idaho Gov. Butch Otter regarding the Mackay Reservoir. In their letter, they cite reasons for possible dam failure, including the age of the dam, proximity to a fault, inadequate monitoring of dam conditions, lack of warning system for residents, and failure to follow inspector recommendations. This was following a 2009 inspection report which stated, “Much about this dam is not known due to poor documentation during initial construction and subsequent modifications. The amount of leakage observed at the right-center toe of the dam is cause for concern despite claims by the owner that ‘it has always leaked like that’”.

== See also ==
- List of dams and reservoirs in Idaho
