= Tamiya Blackfoot =

The Tamiya Blackfoot was a 1/10-scale, electric radio controlled model monster truck produced by the Tamiya Corporation of Japan. It was released October 8, 1986 and produced through 1993.

== Importance ==
The Blackfoot was sold as a kit without radio equipment, a battery pack, or a charger. It formed part of the growing radio controlled model car hobby and was supported by a range of factory and aftermarket parts for maintenance and modification.

== Basis and variations ==
The model's space frame chassis was molded from ABS engineering resin and was identical other than color to the Tamiya R/C dune buggy on which the Blackfoot was based, "The Frog." The Frog's main chassis parts are grey while the Blackfoot's are bright red, presumably since the chassis was far more visible on the Blackfoot. The highly detailed styrene body was that of a Ford F-150 Flareside pickup, itself a carryover from an earlier Tamiya Ford F-150 model based on the SRB-chassis (Special Racing Buggy). Two other similar early releases were given the "monster treatment" as well. The "Monster Beetle" was topped with a replica of a Volkswagen "Baja Bug" while the "Mud Blaster" was a Subaru BRAT sport truck. Mechanically identical to the Blackfoot, the only other differences in these two models besides the bodies and body mounts were plastic wheels vacuum-plated in a golden finish, the inclusion of rubber-spiked tires for slightly improved off-road traction, a metal bracket to support the servo saver and oil-filled, coilover shock absorbers. Also, the Monster Beetle included a combined gearbox skid plate and rear bumper, as well as 2 ball bearings at the differential output points. The retail price of the Monster Beetle and Mud Blaster was about twenty percent higher than that of the Blackfoot, mostly due to the improved shocks. The Blackfoot's inclusion of simple coilover "shocks" less the benefit of oil dampening kept the initial cost of the kit down. Since the oil-filled units were available separately in kit form, Blackfoot owners could easily upgrade once their budget allowed.

== Problems and solutions ==
As rugged as the Blackfoot and its variants were, the design suffered from a number of problems with its drivetrain. Its hexagonal-shaped "dogbone" axles, while allowing for an independent rear suspension, were extremely prone to wear because of the oversized wheels and tires as was the nylon and pot metal-geared differential. The Re-release versions of the newer ORV chassis cars received updated axles and area a huge improvement. The re-release Frog got dogbone style axles, and the Monster Beetle, and Blackfoot re-releases got a CVD style axle. The pot metal parts generally wore out before the nylon parts did. This was attributed to the soft aluminum side plates of the transmission, allowing the differentials bevel gears to flex outwards under load, minimizing gear tooth contact with the differentials spider gears, resulting in the dreaded differential "Clicking" as the gears would skip teeth under load. This was commonly patched by installing 5mm I.D. shims between the bevel gears and differential output bearings (The Monster Beetle had differential bearings stock, The Blackfoot had to be upgraded to ball bearings to do this modification, as side loaded bushings would just get destroyed in a short period). The best known to date upgrade to fix the differential problems is solved by using the "MIP Ball Differential Kit" (MIP Part# 16210), note that is must be used with the re-release axles, and not the original hex drive axles. Miniature ball bearings were an extra cost option to replace the nylon bushings packed with the model for both the transmission and wheels, but were a necessity since rapid wear of the bushings meant a complete overhaul of the transmission and partial disassembly of the rear suspension unless the kit was assembled with bearings from the outset. The expensive, heavy plastic bodies (with a replacement cost roughly half the price of an entire kit) made the model prone to rollover, eventually resulting in a badly scratched, unattractive replica. The tires themselves, even the spiked ones, were basically unsuitable for the off-road situations that the kit was intended for. Several R/C companies rose to the challenge, especially four Southern California companies: MRP, Pro-Line, Thorp Corporation and Robinson Racing. MRP specialized in heavy-duty modified parts, Pro-Line was (and is) a highly regarded manufacturer of R/C wheels, tires and bodies while Thorp and Robinson engineered expensive but rugged differentials and axles, allowing the use of much more powerful, R/C-specific motors than the Mabuchi RS-540 shipped with the kit; this motor was originally designed for use in heavy-duty computer printers. A North Royalton, Ohio-based company, Parma Corporation, made a series of replacement bodies vacuum-formed in lightweight, clear polycarbonate plastic including a direct replacement whose tooling was made from an original styrene body.

== The Blackfoot today ==
Tamiya has marketed several updated version of the Blackfoot. The Super Blackfoot was based on the same basic space frame chassis, with the most important improvements being a better gearbox and double wishbone rear suspension with dogbone driveshafts instead of the original's vulnerable and quickly wearing ORV-type gearbox, trailing arm suspension and hex type drive shafts and sockets. The body was basically the same as that of the Blackfoot, but with a different grill design and new decals. Later, the Super Blackfoot was replaced by the King Blackfoot, this time with an improved front suspension with longer suspension arms. The styrene body for the King Blackfoot was still clearly derived from a Ford design, but no longer identified as being a Ford by Tamiya and a totally new development. Tamiya currently (2005) markets a completely updated model called the "Blackfoot Xtreme." The "Xtreme" has a totally different chassis design than previous versions, but retains the body of the King Blackfoot, just mildly modified with a hood scoop, a modernized grill and new decals. The BX is the final incarnation of the Blackfoot name. The "Xtreme" can even be modified for 4WD with the addition of a front gearbox and a second motor. As a matter of fact, Tamiya markets the 4WD "Wild Dagger", 4WD "Twin Detonator", and the 4WD "Double Blaze" all based on the same basic chassis as the "Xtreme".

The original Blackfoot is out of production, but its parts and aftermarket accessories remain popular with collectors. As for the aftermarket manufacturers, Robinson, Parma and Pro-Line are still in business producing R/C parts; MRP is focused on the production of R/C powerboats and Thorp, who had changed their focus to the production of emergency medical equipment, appear to be out of business.

In 1987 Tamiya released a WILD Mini 4WD version of the Blackfoot, called "Blackfoot Jr." It was the second model in the WILD Mini 4WD series. It has long since been discontinued.

In 2012 Tamiya Released a new version of the Blackfoot called the Blackfoot III, it shares no parts with the older "ORV" chassis but the body is an original reproduction with some updates.

In May 2016 Tamiya announced they will Re-Release the original 1986 Blackfoot with some minor changes to the body and drivetrain.
