= Salmon Falls Creek =

River in Nevada and Idaho, United States

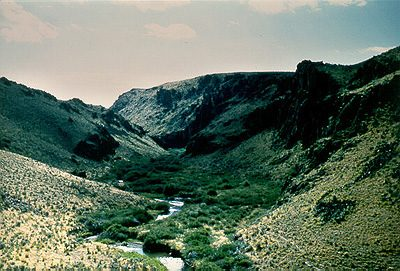
- Looking upstream along Salmon Falls Creek Canyon

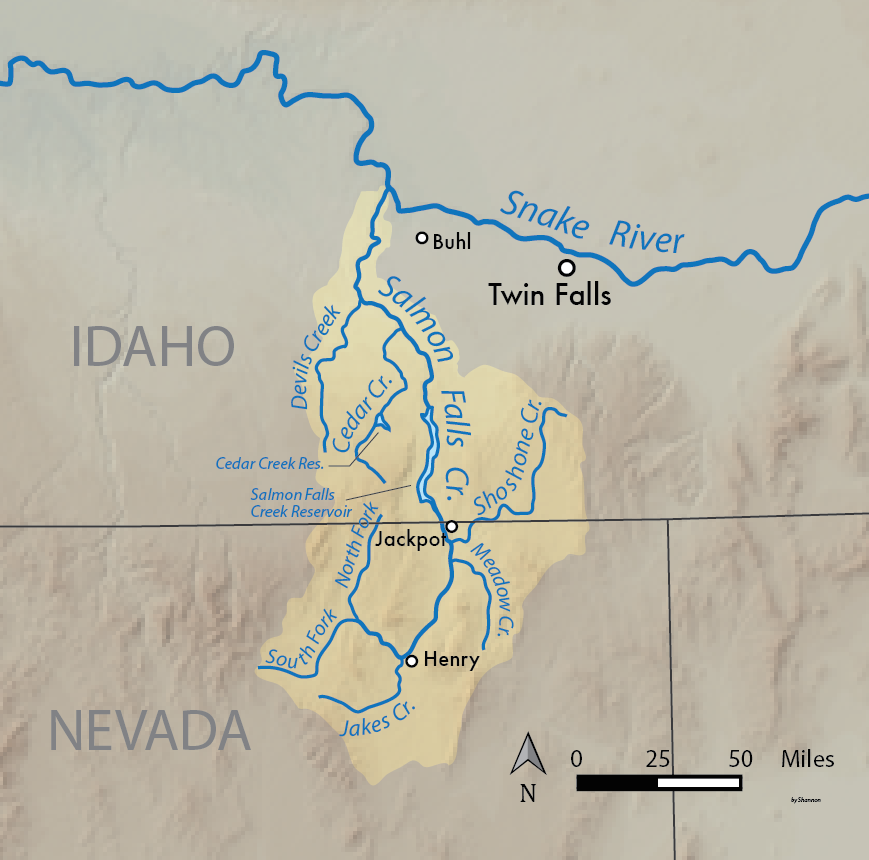
- Map of Salmon Falls Creek

Location
- Country: United States
- State: Nevada, Idaho
- Cities: Jackpot, Nevada, Hollister, Idaho

Physical characteristics
- Source: Confluence of North and South Forks Salmon Creek
  - location: Jarbidge Mountains, Nevada
  - coordinates: 41°47′22″N 114°57′43″W
  - elevation: 5,643 ft (1,720 m)
- Mouth: Snake River
  - location: Near Hagerman, Snake River Plain, Idaho
  - coordinates: 42°42′55″N 114°51′12″W
  - elevation: 3,431 ft (1,046 m)
- Length: 121 mi (195 km)
- Basin size: 2,103 sq mi (5,450 km^{2})
- Discharge
  - location: Snake River
  - average: 345 cu ft/s (9.8 m^{3}/s)
  - minimum: 0 cu ft/s (0 m^{3}/s)
  - maximum: 7,500 cu ft/s (210 m^{3}/s)
- Discharge
  - location: Upstream of Salmon Falls Creek Reservoir
  - average: 34.3 cu ft/s (0.97 m^{3}/s)

Basin features
- Tributaries
  - left: North Fork Salmon Falls Creek, Cottonwood Creek, Cedar Creek, Big Creek
  - right: South Fork Salmon Falls Creek, Jakes Creek, Meadow Creek, Trout Creek, Shoshone Creek, China Creek

Salmon Falls Creek is a tributary of the Snake River, flowing from northern Nevada into Idaho in the United States. Formed in high mountains at the northern edge of the Great Basin, Salmon Falls Creek flows northwards 121 miles (195 km), draining an arid and mountainous basin of 2,103 square miles (5,450 km^{2}). The Salmon Falls Creek valley served as a trade route between the Native American groups of the Snake River Plain and Great Basin. Today, most of its water is used for irrigation.

== Course ==
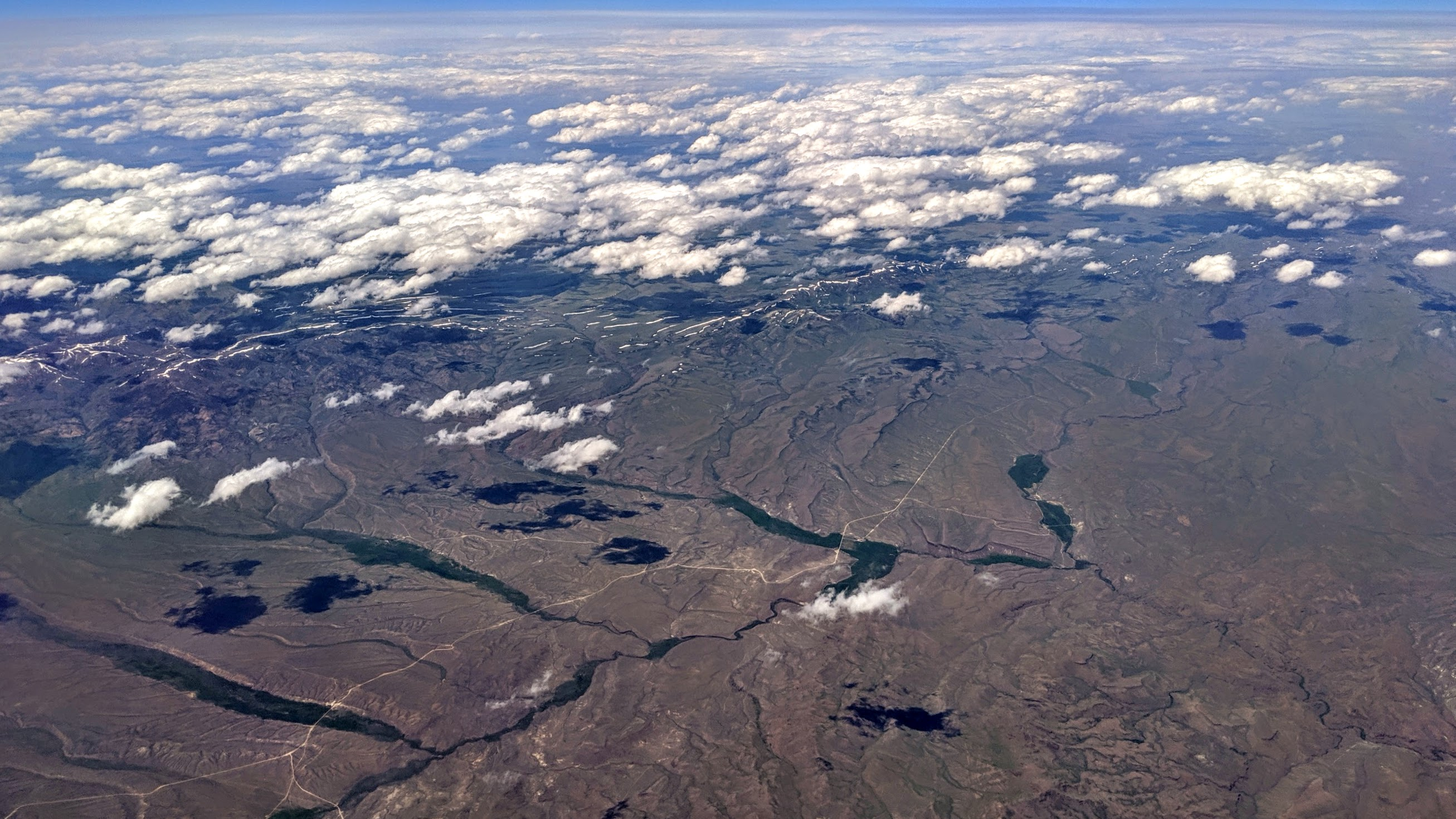
Salmon Falls Creek headwaters area in Nevada, with the confluence of north and south forks and south fork tributary streams

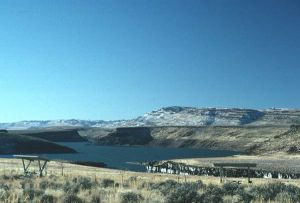
Salmon Falls Creek entering the southern end of Salmon Falls Creek Reservoir

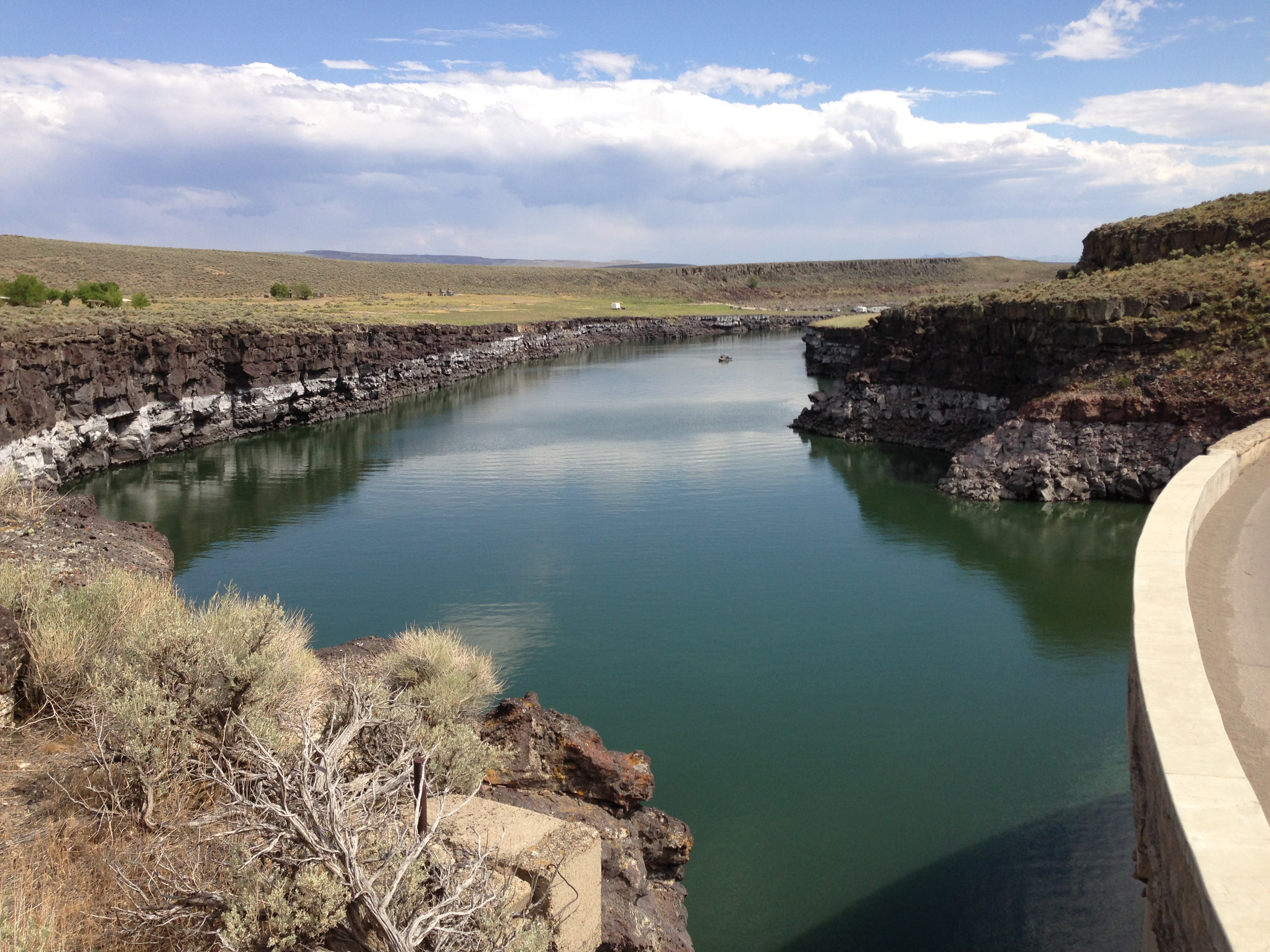
View south down the Salmon Falls Creek Reservoir from the east end of the Salmon Falls Creek Dam

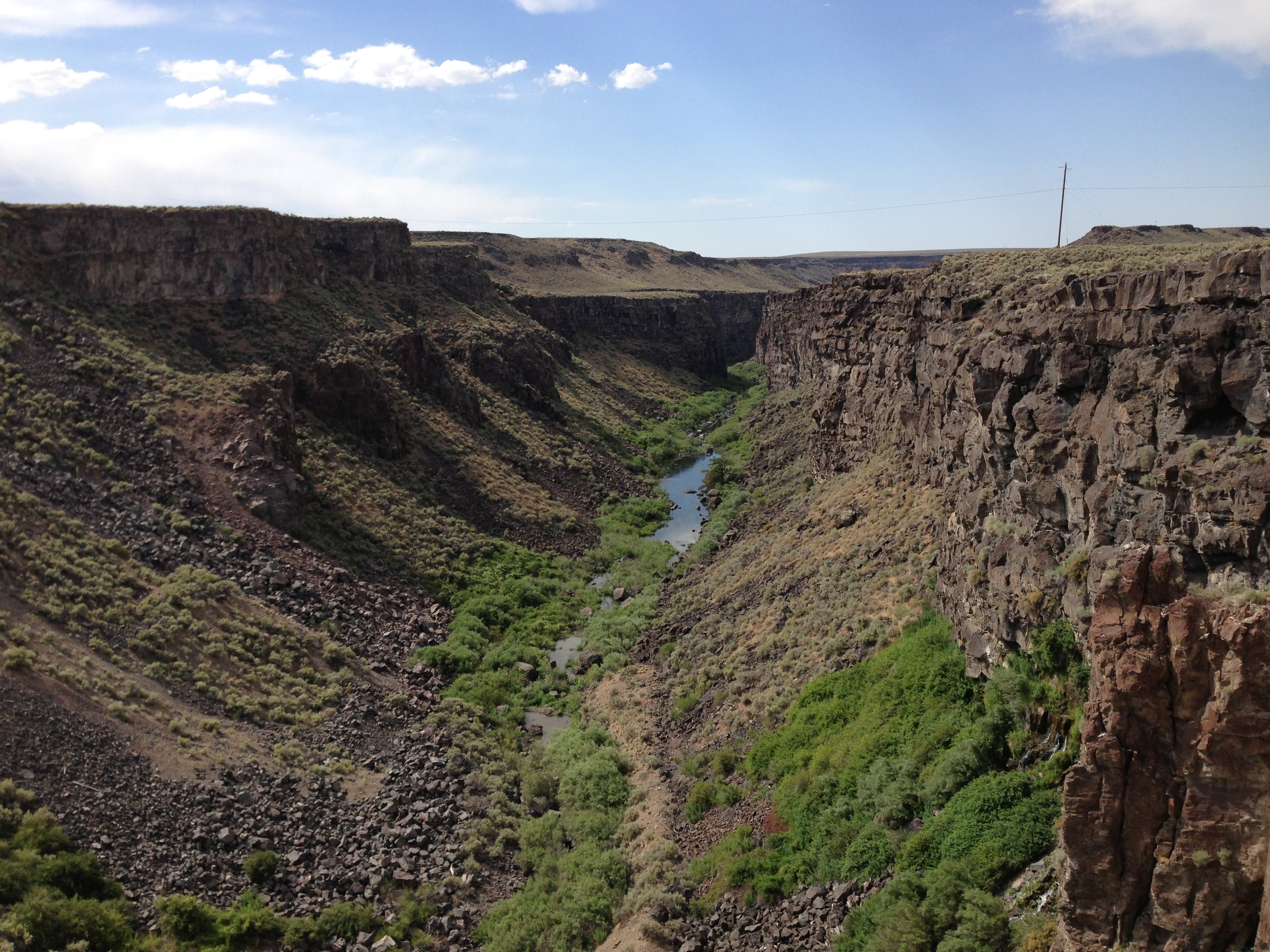
View north down the Salmon Falls Creek Gorge from the Salmon Falls Dam

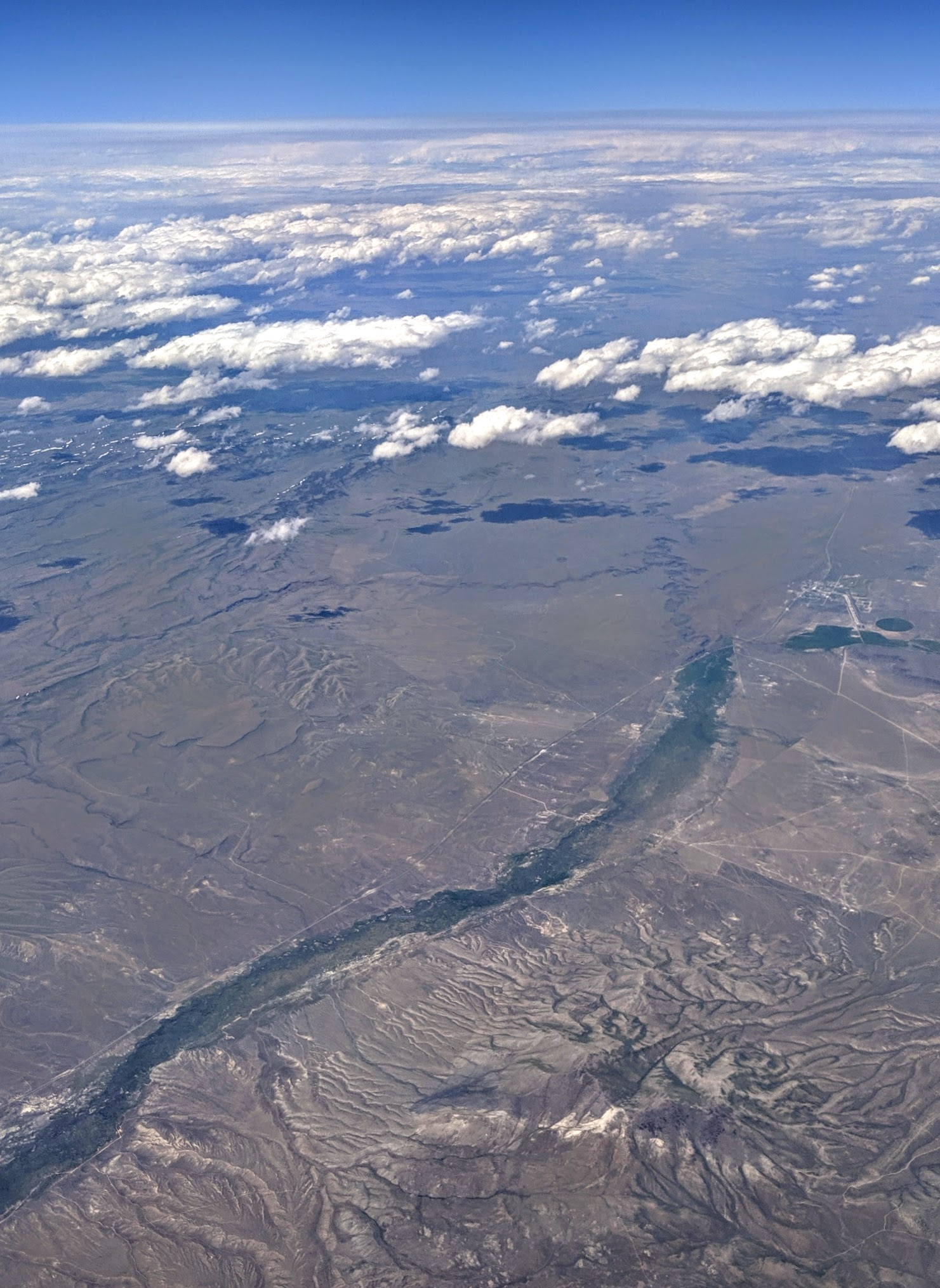
Salmon Falls Creek approaching Jackpot, Nevada, and the confluence with Cottonwood Creek (not the same Cottonwood Creek that is a tributary to the South Fork)

Salmon Falls Creek rises in the arid Jarbidge Mountains of northern Nevada at the confluence of its North and South Forks. The North Fork, sometimes considered the main stem of Salmon Falls Creek, is 24.3 miles (39.1 km) long, and the South Fork 12.1 miles (19.5 km) long. Many of the creek's headwater streams originate in the Humboldt National Forest and converge to form a short canyon. At the confluence with Jakes Creek the creek swings northeast into the O'Neil Basin, a valley along U.S. Highway 93, flowing north 40 miles (64 km), then passes the town of Jackpot and receives Shoshone Creek, its largest tributary, from the right.

From the Shoshone Creek confluence, Salmon Falls Creek enters another canyon that takes it 11 miles (18 km) across the Nevada-Idaho state border, merging with Cottonwood Creek, into Salmon Falls Creek Reservoir which is impounded by the arch concrete Salmon Falls Dam constructed across the creek between 1908 and 1910. After passing through the long and narrow lake, the creek cuts into a deep canyon as it enters the Snake River Plain, receiving Cedar Creek and Big Creek near Castleford. The creek empties into the Snake River 10 miles (16 km) south of Hagerman.

Before irrigation diversions began in the early 20th century, the average flow at the mouth was 345 cubic feet per second (9.8 m^{3}/s). Following the construction of Salmon Falls Creek Reservoir and the diversion of many of its tributaries, the flow at its mouth from 2002 to 2005 averaged 116.5 cubic feet per second (3.30 m^{3}/s). The average discharge upstream of the reservoir was 34.3 cubic feet per second (0.97 m^{3}/s). Much of the flow in the last few miles is provided by four major irrigation drains that carry runoff from the extensive agricultural areas surrounding lower Salmon Falls Creek, because all the water released from Salmon Falls Creek Reservoir is diverted shortly below the dam. Work has been done to reduce pollutants flowing into the lower creek from these drains, including excess nitrogen, phosphorus and fecal coliforms.

== Watershed ==
Spread across approximately 2,103 square miles (5,450 km^{2}) with 871 square miles (2,260 km^{2}) in the state of Idaho, the Salmon Falls Creek basin drains portions of Elko County in Nevada and Owyhee and Twin Falls County in Idaho. Much of the southern portion of the watershed is part of the Basin and Range Province of northern Nevada, while the lower watershed is characterized by the basalt plateau of the Snake River Plain. As a whole, the entire Salmon Falls Creek watershed is very arid. Much of the basin receives less than 10 inches (25 cm) of rain annually, while the mountainous areas may get up to 30 inches (76 cm). Rainfall in the mountains provides most of the perennial flow into Salmon Falls Creek Reservoir, while springs from the Snake River Aquifer also provide some water.

Several major tributary streams provide much of the flow of Salmon Falls Creek as well. The largest tributary is Shoshone Creek, which flows west from the Sawtooth National Forest and enters just upstream of the town of Jackpot. Cottonwood, China, Big, House, Jakes, and Cedar Creeks are some of the other perennial streams in the basin. Since Cedar Creek Reservoir was impounded in 1905, water no longer flows down the creek, whose course is mostly within Idaho. The southern portion of the watershed harbors many springs escaping from the foothills of the mountains, feeding the upper tributary streams. The lower Salmon Falls Creek forms part of the boundary between the Eastern Snake River Plain Aquifer and Western Snake River Plain Aquifer. Most of the southern basin lies between the Jarbidge Mountains and Granite Range on the west and the Sawtooth Mountains on the east, with many peaks rising to 10,000 feet (3,000 m) or more.

The basin and range topography of northern Nevada and the extensive and flat Snake River Plain characterize the geologically young Salmon Falls Creek basin. The Basin and Range area was created by crustal stretching along an area dense in faults running north to south, with valleys forming along the fault lines. Sediments deposited by streams and lakes in the Pliocene and Miocene filled much of the present-day main stem valley. Lower on the creek, basalt rocks of volcanic origin and thick deposits of loess soil compose the primary surface geology. Beginning about 12 million years ago, the North American Plate slowly passed over a large volcanic hotspot, which formed and caused frequent volcanic activity throughout the Snake River Plain. The hotspot, which now lies beneath Yellowstone National Park, deposited massive lava flows throughout the plain. About 14,500 years ago, the Bonneville Flood rushed through the Snake River Plain, carving out and extending many canyons including lower Salmon Falls Creek Canyon. The extent of the floods was so great that most of lower Salmon Falls Creek pooled up into a temporary lake as miles of land were submerged on both sides of the Snake. Wind-blown soil and sediment deposited by the floods have covered most of the basalt, which is still exposed in areas such as Salmon Falls Creek Canyon.

Pollution from agricultural runoff and overtaxing of water resources is a prevailing issue in the Salmon Falls Creek watershed. With heavy groundwater withdrawal, many of the springs feeding the lower Salmon Falls Creek have decreased in volume. Because the 220-foot (67 m)-high Salmon Falls Dam has not released any water (except for that needed for irrigation) since the floods of 1984, the lower creek depends almost entirely on irrigation runoff drainage to sustain its flow. Pollutants in the runoff have, as a result, hurt the vegetation corridor in the lower canyon. Several tributaries flowing from northern Nevada into southern Idaho have been diverted, leaving even less water to replenish the lower creek.

== History ==
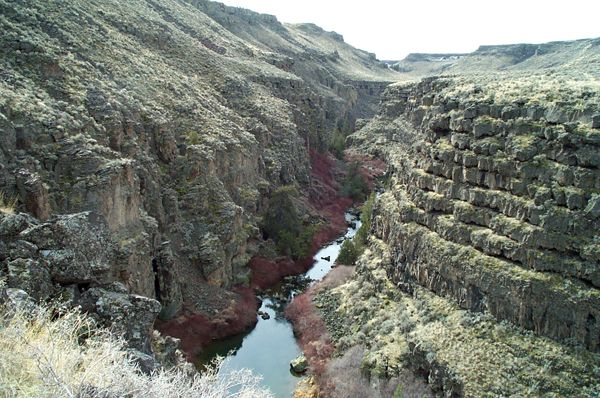
Salmon Falls Creek Canyon in Idaho

Salmon Falls Creek is probably named for Salmon Falls, a large cataract and historical Native American fishing spot on the Snake River upstream of their confluence. A short distance further upstream is Shoshone Falls, the natural upriver limit of migrating salmon on the Snake River. The stretch of the Snake River below Shoshone Falls was once known for its huge runs of spawning salmon, which were an important food source for the local Shoshone and Bannock peoples. The construction of many dams in the 20th century have since prevented the salmon from reaching this part of the river. Other names for the creek have included Holmes Creek, Salmon Creek, Salmon Falls River, and the Salmon River. Historically the creek was more of a river, fed by springs in the extensive Snake River Aquifer and snowmelt from the Jarbidge Mountains.

The Salmon Falls Creek valley was an important trading route through which the Shoshone Indians in the Snake River Plain and the Paiute in the Great Basin interacted. The first Europeans to see the creek were likely fur trappers from the British Hudson's Bay Company traveling through the area in the early 19th century. In the early 1900s a canal system was built to supply irrigation water to Idaho's Magic Valley and the city of Twin Falls was incorporated in 1905. The first proposal to dam the nearby Salmon Falls Creek for irrigation was in 1909, and surmised that an additional 130,000 acres (530 km^{2}) of farm land could thusly be brought into production. The Salmon Falls Dam was completed in 1910 and raised in 1934. However, the water supply was less than originally expected, and only 35,000 acres (140 km^{2}) ended up being developed.

== Biology and fish ==
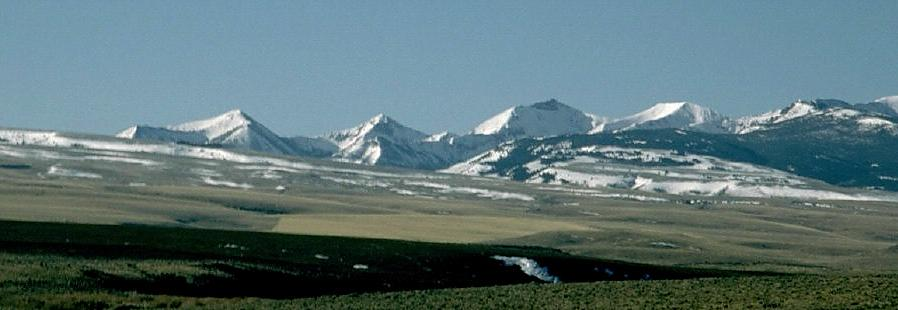
The Jarbidge Range from the O'Neil Basin of Salmon Falls Creek

The Salmon Falls Creek watershed varies widely in terms of different habitats. Along the lower section of the creek, plentiful water flow and numerous springs create a rich riparian environment compared to an oasis, lined with coyote willow, dogwood, golden currant, cattail, mint and poison ivy. The upper section is a slow-moving waterway that supports a small wetland and extensive meadows. In contrast, the vast majority of the upper undeveloped watershed is a shrub-steppe sagebrush grassland, much of which is used for grazing. Many bird species use the Salmon Falls Creek canyon, including white-throated swift, canyon and rock wrens, cliff swallow, violet-green swallow, barn swallow, screech owl, long-eared owl, great horned owl, kestrel, red-tailed hawk, golden eagles and prairie falcon. Mule deer also inhabit areas of the middle and upper Salmon Falls Creek basin.

Although the namesake Pacific salmon are no longer present in the creek, many fish inhabit the main stem and its tributaries throughout, but especially in Salmon Falls Creek Reservoir. Many fish are stocked in the reservoir including brown trout, Chinook salmon, kokanee salmon (landlocked sockeye), yellow perch, black crappie, channel catfish, smallmouth bass, and especially abundant is walleye. The Salmon Falls Creek reservoir is said to be one of the most plentiful fisheries in southern Idaho.

== See also ==
- List of rivers of Idaho
- List of longest streams of Idaho
- List of rivers of Nevada
- List of tributaries of the Columbia River
- Bruneau River
- Hagerman Fossil Beds National Monument
- Lost streams of Idaho
- Snake River Canyon (Idaho)
