= Blackfoot Creek =

Stream in South Dakota, U.S.

Coordinates: 45°56′32″N 100°31′17″W

Blackfoot Creek is a stream in the U.S. state of South Dakota.

Blackfoot Creek was named after the Blackfoot Sioux.

== See also ==
- List of rivers of South Dakota
