= Ririe Reservoir =

Dam in Idaho, United States

Ririe Dam
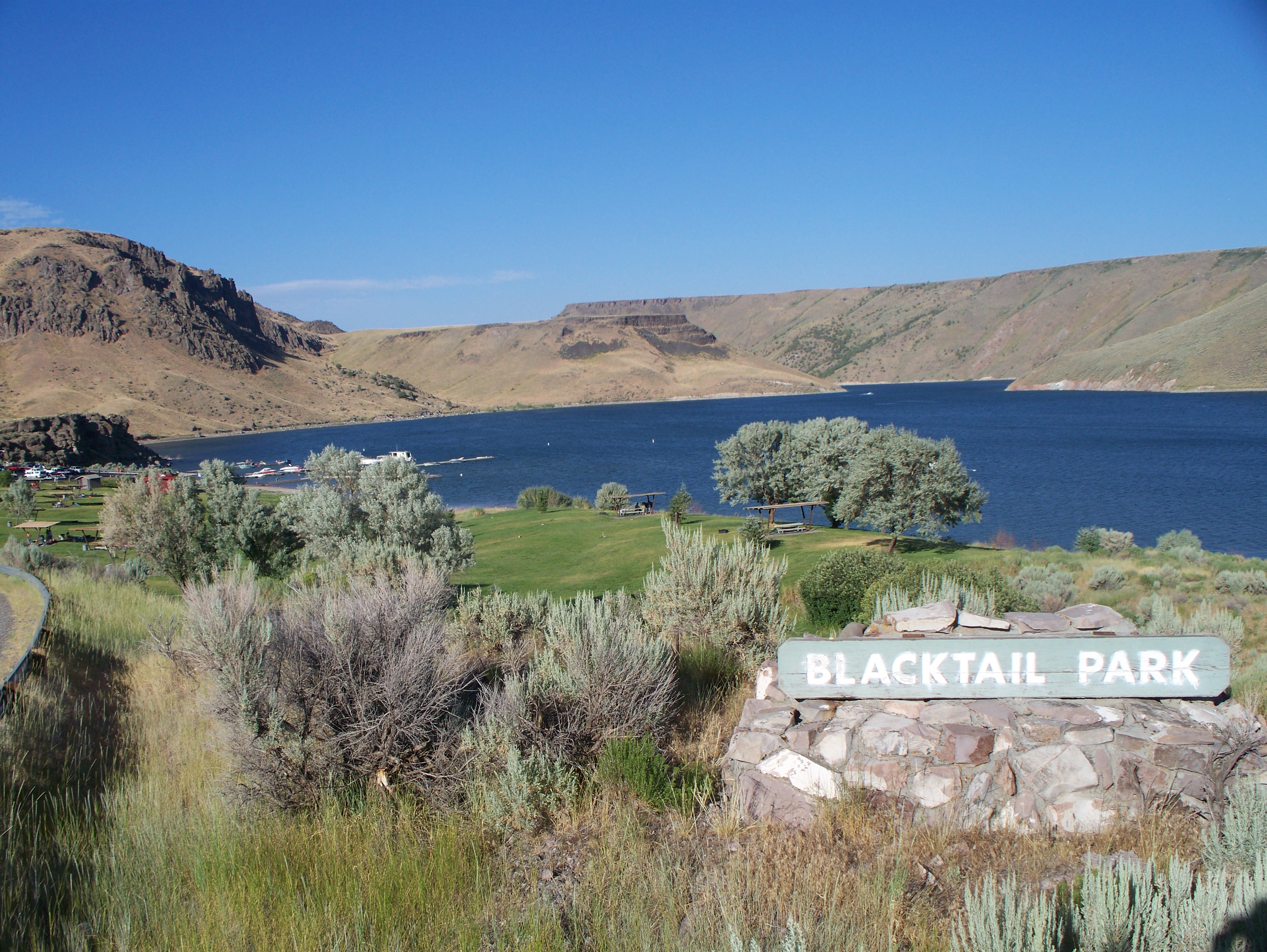
- Blacktail Park, on the shore of the reservoir
- Official name: Ririe Dam
- Location: Upper Snake River Basin, Bonneville County, Idaho, USA
- Coordinates: 43°34′54″N 111°44′30″W
- Construction began: January 1970
- Opening date: February 1978
- Operator(s): Bonneville County Parks & Recreation Department

Dam and spillways
- Impounds: Willow Creek
- Height: 77.11 meters
- Length: 326.14 meters
- Width (base): 15 meters

Reservoir
- Creates: Ririe Reservoir
- Total capacity: 124,000 megaliters
- Surface area: 6.1 km^{2}
- Normal elevation: 5,125 ft (1,562 m)

The Ririe Reservoir is a reservoir located near Ririe, Idaho. It allows for irrigation, flood control, and provides recreational opportunities.

In 1972 the Ririe Dam, built on Willow Creek by the United States Army Corps of Engineers, was the site of the first practical application of steel fibrous shotcrete, which was used to build a tunnel adit. The dam's total capacity is more than 100,000 acre-feet of water. On October 14, 1976, the Corps of Engineers formally transferred control of the dam to the United States Bureau of Reclamation.

== Ecology ==
The area surrounding the dam is hilly shrub-stepped and features the sagebrush and bunch grass typical of the area. The reservoir itself contains rainbow trout, kokanee salmon, cutthroat trout, smallmouth bass, and yellow perch.

== Possibility of failure ==
If the Ririe Dam failed catastrophically, either from a natural disaster or a human initiated event, it would reach the first population center, the City of Ucon, in 108 minutes; it would reach the City of Idaho Falls, the major population center of Bonneville County, in 187 minutes. The Dam is not staffed 24 hours a day and therefore, it is anticipated that there would be at least a fifteen (15) minute lag between event initiation and the commencement of the notification to residents.
