= McArthur Lake (Idaho) =

Reservoir in Boundary County, Idaho, U.S.

- Location in Idaho
- Location: Boundary County, Idaho, USA
- Coordinates: 48°30′50″N 116°26′59″W
- Basin countries: United States
- Surface area: 600 acres (240 ha)
- Surface elevation: 2,090 ft (637 m)

McArthur Lake is a reservoir in Boundary County, Idaho, USA. It gives its name to the McArthur Lake Wildlife Corridor, which provides a bridge for wildlife to migrate between two mountainous areas. The reservoir and surrounding wetlands are rich in bird life, and are protected by the McArthur Lake Wildlife Management Area. There has been discussion about removing the dam that impounds the reservoir, which would improve the wetlands so they would support larger numbers of game birds, and would also improve the quality of water downstream.

== Location ==
McArthur Lake is a reservoir in Boundary County, Idaho. It covers about 600 acres (240 ha). The area is popular for activities such as hunting, fishing and hiking. The lake is in the McArthur Lake Wildlife Corridor, which forms a route between the Selkirk and Cabinet mountains, and is used by species such as grizzly bear, elk and wolverine to reach the Idaho Panhandle and the Kootenai National Forest. The corridor connects the Selkirk and Cabinet-Yaak grizzly bear recovery zones.

The reservoir is about 18 miles (29 km) north of Sandpoint and 13 miles (21 km) south of Bonners Ferry. Highway 2/95 from Sandpoint to Bonners Ferry runs past the east shore. As of 2009 about 6,600 vehicles crossed the wildlife corridor daily on the highway. It was the top place for wildlife collisions in the state, with 34 collisions in 2007.

== Hydrology ==
The reservoir impounds Deep Creek, which enters at the southwest end and leaves from the northeast, and is also fed from the northwest by Dodge Creek. The dam is an earthen berm about 500 feet (150 m) long with a 50 feet (15 m) concrete spillway roughly in the middle. The spillway includes a fish ladder, which helps preserve the fish population for recreational fishing on the reservoir. The fish ladder includes a sloping channel beside the spillway, with a series of low steps above it leading to the dam.

Surrounding area

Deep Creek rises east of White Mountain (Note: White Mountain in Boundary County is at 48.5202076°N 116.5315869°W and has an elevation of 5,003 feet (1,525 m) above sea level. It should not be confused with the much higher White Mountain (Idaho) at 44.57476°N 114.49565°W with an elevation of 10,442 feet (3,183 m).) and has a watershed area of about 480 square kilometres (190 sq mi). McArthur Lake is about 10 kilometres (6.2 mi) from its headwaters. The creek flows about 33 kilometres (21 mi) north from the reservoir until it meets the Kootenay River, which in turn is a tributary of the Columbia River. The impoundment has seriously affected the creek's water quality. Idaho’s Clean Water Act Section 303(d) includes the creek on the list of impaired waters due to excessive sediment and elevated temperatures. In 2017 Idaho Fish & Game (IDFG) stated that no decision had been made to remove the dam, but this was being considered as a way to both improve the wetlands so more waterfowl would be available for hunting, and to improve Deep Creek water quality.

== Fish ==
McArthur Lake is shallow, with warm waters. Recreational fishing is mainly limited to warm water species: perch, largemouth bass and pumpkinseed. Tributaries above the dam are used for spawning by wild adfluvial redband trout from Kootenay Lake, British Columbia. The warm water of the reservoir may raise the mortality levels of juvenile fish migrating downstream. There are restrictions on boating with the purpose of protecting aquatic vegetation and nesting birds. This limits access to anglers. The reservoir is drained periodically so that vegetation can be controlled and waterfowl production improved. Drainage of the reservoir reduces the population of perch, but allows the surviving fish to grow larger.

== Wildlife management area ==
The McArthur Lake Wildlife Management Area covers 1,207 acres (488 ha), including the reservoir. Observed wildlife include 22 species of fish, 7 species of amphibians, 6 species of reptiles, 45 species of mammals, and more than 223 species of birds. Birds include raptors, shorebirds, songbirds, upland birds, waterbirds and waterfowl. In the spring and fall it is a resting place for Canada geese, American wigeon, mallard, green-winged teal, lesser scaup, common goldeneye and bufflehead. In late summer the site is home to American white pelican and shorebirds such as killdeer, Wilson's snipe, greater yellowlegs, long-billed dowitcher, western sandpiper, spotted sandpiper and solitary sandpiper. Nesting birds include veery, Swainson's thrush, Vaux's swift and bald eagle.

== Sources ==
- Albers, Gwen (22 January 2009), "Mcarthur Lake Idaho's Top Spot For Wildlife Collisions", Bonners Ferry Herald
- Beard, Zachary S.; Quist, Michael C.; Hardy, Ryan S.; Ross, Tyler J. (2017), "Habitat Associations of Juvenile Burbot in a Tributary of the Kootenai River", Transactions of the American Fisheries Society, 146 (5): 1008–1015, doi:10.1080/00028487.2017.1334702
- Fisheries Management Plan 2007 - 2012 (PDF), Idaho Department of Fish and Game
- Kellar, C. (6 May 2011), McArthur Lake Wildlife Corridor Project - Phase II (PDF), The Trust for Public Land
- Kootenai Valley Resource Initiative Board Meeting (PDF), 15 May 2017
- McArthur Lake Dam Fish Ladder, Groundspeak, Inc., 21 July 2014
- McArthur Lake in Boundary County ID, HTL
- "McArthur Lake Reservoir", NorthIdaho.org
- McArthur Lake, The Trust for Public Land
- McArthur Lake Wildlife Management Area, Idaho Fish and Game Watchable Wildlife Program
- Retallic, Ken; Barker, Rocky (July 2008), Wingshooter's Guide to Idaho: Upland Birds and Waterfowl, Wilderness Adventures Press, ISBN 978-1-932098-56-3
- USGS Place Name: White Mountain, MyTopo, A Trimble Company
- "White Mountain (ID)", SummitPost.org
