= Blackfoot Mountains =

Mountain range in Idaho, United States

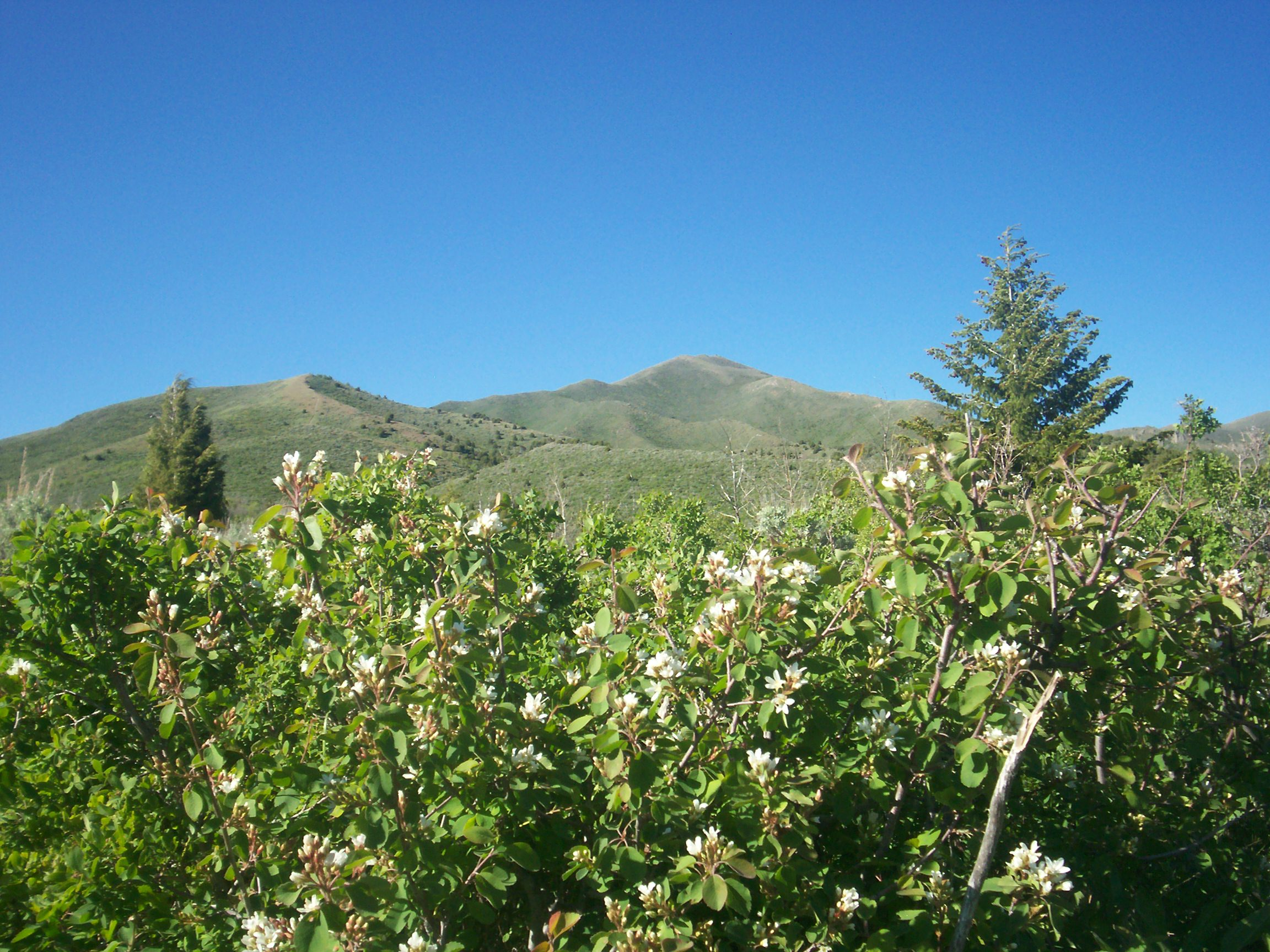
- Taylor Mountain (Bingham County, Idaho)

Highest point
- Peak: Taylor Mountain (Bingham County, Idaho)
- Elevation: 2,220 m (7,280 ft)
- Coordinates: 43°18′19″N 111°55′18″W

Geography
- Location within Idaho
- Country: United States
- States: Idaho
- Range coordinates: 43°11′N 111°50′W
- Parent range: Rocky Mountains

The Blackfoot Mountains, also called the Blackfoot Range, is a small range of mountains located east of Blackfoot, Idaho. Most of the area is private property, including the range's tallest mountain, Taylor Mountain. This mountain was named after Sam Taylor, an early settler of Idaho and brother of Matt Taylor. The Blackfoot River carves through the region. Within this range is Wolverine Canyon, a public area that features sites for hiking, camping, kayaking, rock climbing and other recreational pursuits.

== Ecology ==
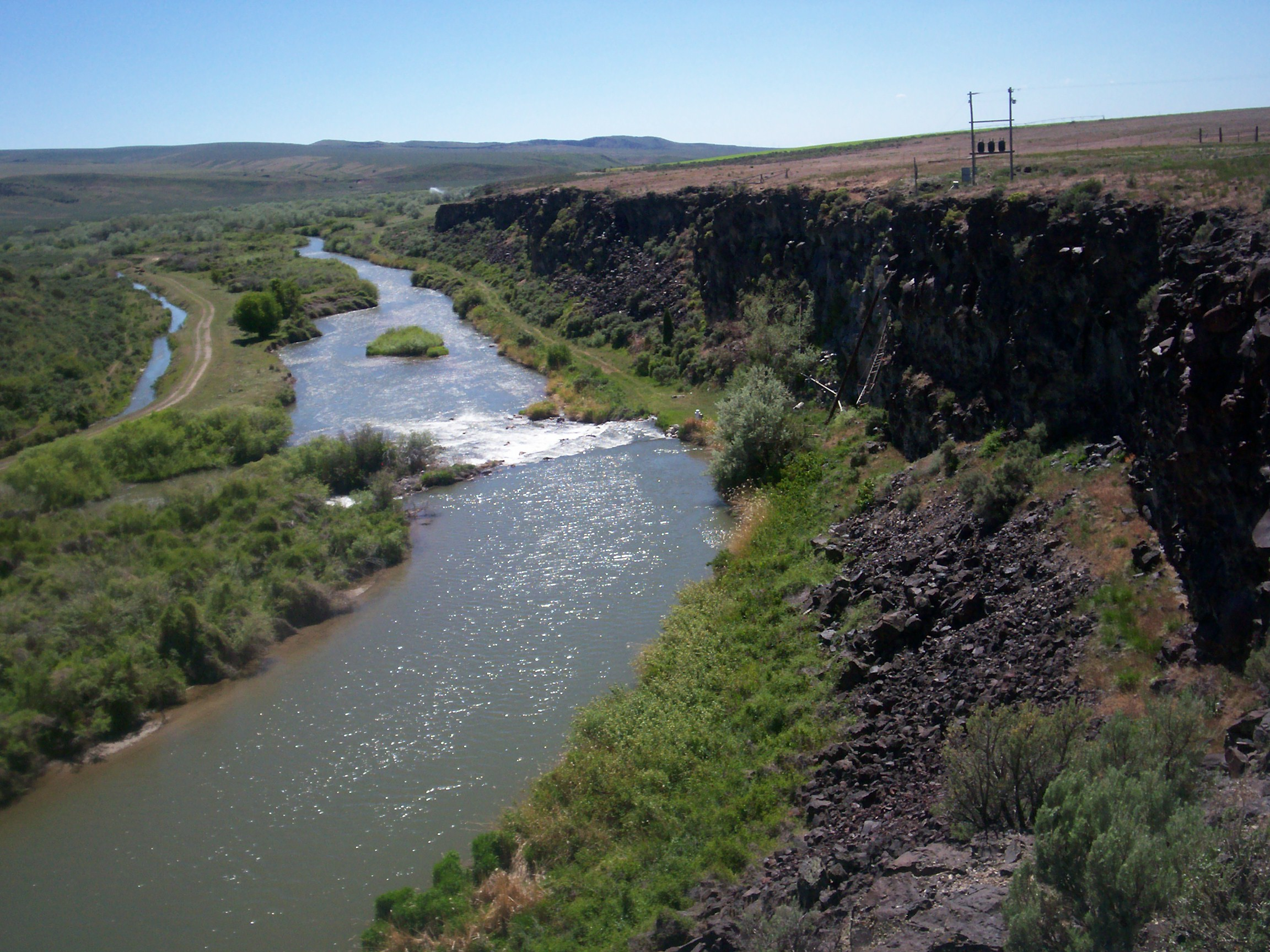
Wolverine Canyon is the result of Wolverine Creek eroding the mainly black basalt of the Blackfoot Mountains.

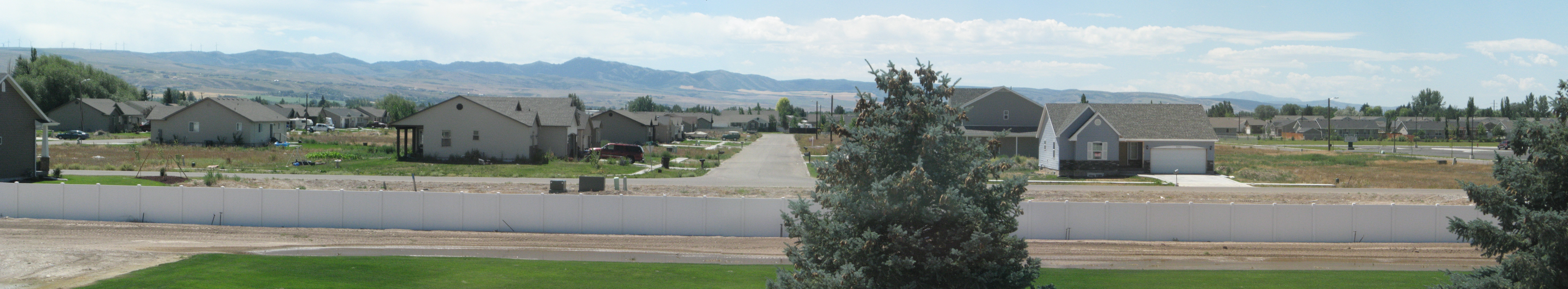
The Blackfoot Mountains as seen from near Iona, Idaho

This area is mainly a hilly shrub-steppe, covered in sagebrush and juniper. However, there are many springs and small streams which form microclimates with more water-loving plants. The mountains themselves are mainly basalt.
