= Blackfoot Dam =

- Location within Idaho
- Location: Caribou County, Idaho
- Coordinates: 43°00′14″N 111°42′59″W
- Purpose: Flood control, irrigation
- Status: Operational
- Opening date: 1911
- Operator: Bureau of Indian Affairs

Dam and spillways
- Type of dam: Earth fill dam
- Impounds: Blackfoot River
- Height (foundation): 55 feet (17 m)
- Length: 304 feet (93 m)

Reservoir
- Creates: Blackfoot Reservoir
- Total capacity: 413,000 acre-feet (509,000 ML)
- Surface area: 18,000 acres (7,300 ha)

Blackfoot Dam (National Inventory of Dams ID ID00204) is a dam in Caribou County, Idaho, in the eastern part of the state. The earthen dam was completed in 1911 by the United States Bureau of Indian Affairs, with a height of 55 feet (17 m) and 304 feet (93 m) long at its crest. It impounds the Blackfoot River of Idaho for flood control and irrigation water storage primarily for the Fort Hall Indian Reservation. The dam is owned and operated by the Bureau. Its construction came eight years before the 1919 formation of Caribou County.

The reservoir it creates, Blackfoot Reservoir, has a water surface of 18,000 acres (7,300 ha), and a maximum capacity of 413,000 acre-feet (509,000,000 m^{3}). Blackfoot Dam impounds the river at the northwestern end of the reservoir; the China Hat Dam towards the southwest of the reservoir was constructed in 1923 to resolve seepage problems. Recreation includes fishing for rainbow and cutthroat trout, as well as carp.
