= Blackfoot diatreme =

Diatreme in southeastern British Columbia, Canada

The Blackfoot diatreme is a diatreme in southeastern British Columbia, Canada, located 60 km (37 mi) northeast of Cranbrook. It is 1,000 m (3,281 ft) in length with a maximum width of 400 m (1,312 ft). The diatreme is elongate in shape, and outcrops east of Blackfoot Creek.

== See also ==
- Volcanism in Canada
- List of volcanoes in Canada
