= McArthur Lake Wildlife Corridor =

Wildlife corridor in Idaho, U.S.

- Sketch map

- Location within the United States
- Coordinates: 48.510°N 116.434°W
- Designation: Wildlife corridor
- Administrator: The Nature Conservancy, Idaho Department of Lands

The McArthur Lake Wildlife Corridor (MLWC) is a wildlife corridor in northern Idaho, United States. It links the wilderness areas of the Selkirk and Cabinet mountains, and is used by species such as grizzly bears that move between these areas. It also provides a wintering area for deer and other ungulates. A highway and two railway lines run through the corridor, with a strip of side roads, buildings and fences along the highway. The highway section running through the corridor has high rates of vehicle collisions with wildlife. There is limited opportunity for creating safe wildlife crossings due to the difficult terrain. Conservation groups have been active in obtaining easements on timber land to prevent further development in the corridor while allowing sustainable forestry.

== Location ==
The McArthur Lake Wildlife Corridor forms a route between the Selkirk and Cabinet mountains, and is used by species such as grizzly bear, elk and wolverine to reach the Idaho Panhandle and the Kootenai National Forest. The corridor connects the Selkirk and Cabinet-Yaak grizzly bear recovery zones. It takes its name from McArthur Lake, which lies in the center of the corridor.

Highway 2/95 from Sandpoint to Bonners Ferry runs through the corridor. The corridor is also crossed by the Union Pacific Railroad and the Burlington Northern Santa Fe Railway. The corridor's concentration area extends along the highway for approximately 11 miles (18 km). Development for about 1 mile (1.6 km) on each side of the highway includes buildings, fences, roads and driveways. The many access roads along this stretch of the highway make fencing difficult.

== Environment ==
McArthur Lake Wildlife Corridor is in a scenic area of Idaho. It contains conifer forests, forested or shrub wetlands and swamps, streams and rivers. The high-quality cold water streams are home to the only populations of interior redband trout known in Idaho, and are key to recovery of the threatened bull trout. Animals that migrate through the corridor include American black bear (Ursus americanus), Canada lynx (Lynx canadensis), elk (Cervus canadensis), gray wolf (Canis lupus), grizzly bear (Ursus arctos horribilis), moose (Alces americanus), white-tailed deer (Odocoileus virginianus) and wolverine (Gulo gulo). The corridor supports six species that are federally listed or candidates to be considered threatened or endangered, and many others that are rare and sensitive.

As well as being a linkage area between the Selkirk and Cabinet Mountains the MLWC provides a winter range for moose and white-tailed deer. In the spring and early summer it is a natal area for several species of ungulate, who are at risk as they move around and cross the highway. In the summer it is more important for grizzlies. In fall and winter it is a residence area for ungulates. The corridor is known as an excellent area for hunting and fishing. Hunters target elk, mule deer, moose, white-tailed deer, black bear, mountain lion, waterfowl and upland game birds. The public also uses the corridor for hiking and berry picking.

== Vehicle collisions ==
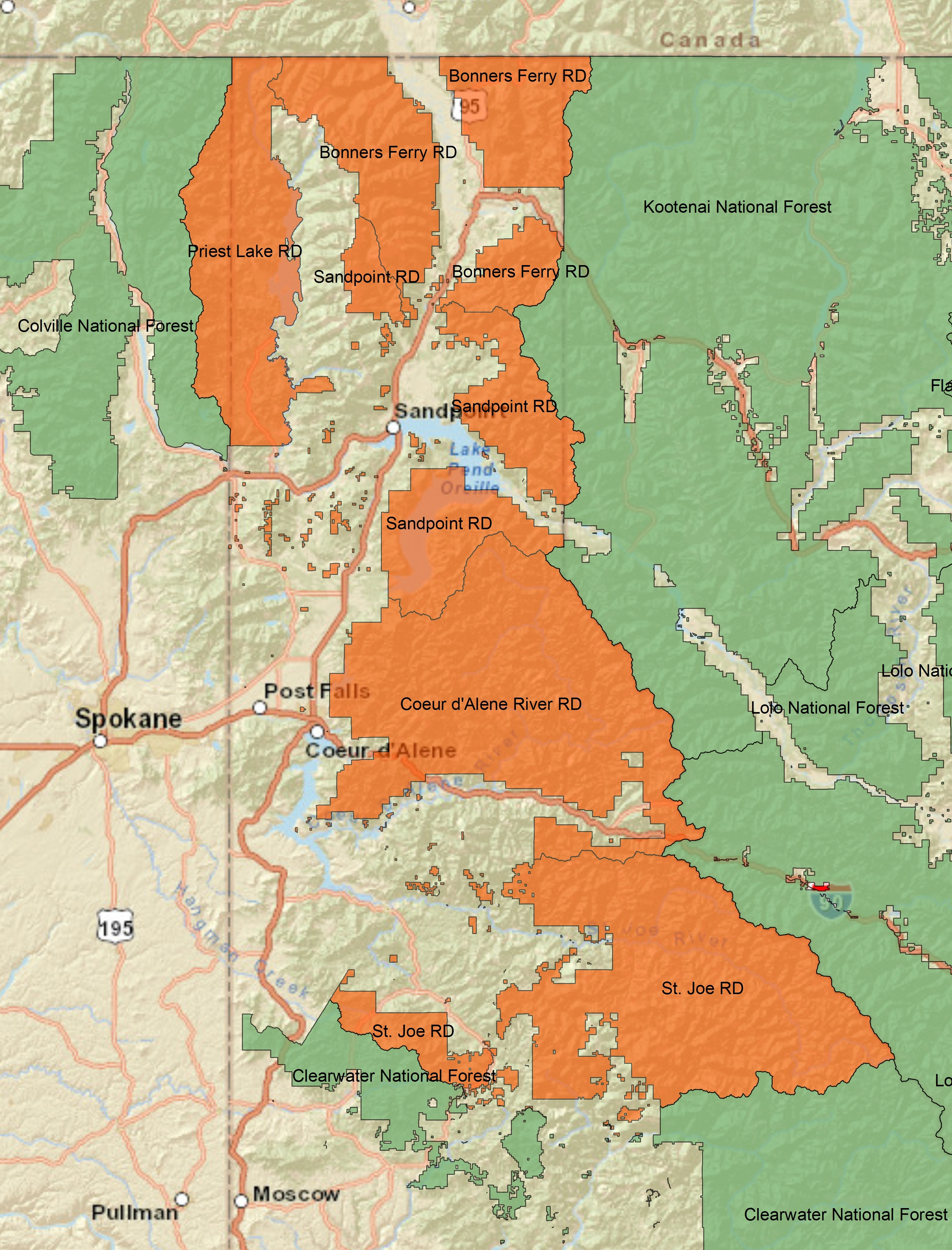
Idaho panhandle. The corridor is in the north at the narrowest point between the orange forest areas to the east and west of the highway.

The area has the greatest number of collisions with wildlife in Idaho. The animals move down to lower land in the winter, taking them to the Highway 95 area, called the "McArthur Killing Fields" by an employee of the Idaho Department of Transportation. In the winter of 1996 northern Idaho received an exceptional 19 feet (5.8 m) of snow, which forced deer, elk and moose to move down to the area around Route 95. The animals could easily cross the 2 feet (0.61 m) snow banks, but became confused and vulnerable on the icy highway. At least 200 deer were killed by collisions with cars that winter, as well as a few moose and elk. As of 2009 about 6,600 vehicles crossed the wildlife corridor daily on the highway. It was the top place for wildlife collisions in the state, with 34 collisions in 2007. Animals other than birds killed by vehicles are, in order of frequency, white-tailed deer, turtles, otter, moose, elk and wolverine.

At one stage there was funding for an underpass in the concentration area of the corridor, but for various reasons this was lost. When the culvert at the McArthur Lake Dam on Deep Creek is replaced by a bridge, that would be used to provide a passageway for wildlife. To the south of the culvert the topography and high water table make it difficult to install structures for wildlife crossings.

The National Fish and Wildlife Foundation (NFWF) under its Cabinet Yaak Wildlife Corridors program has given funding to The Nature Conservancy to provide safer passage of people and wildlife in the corridor. In January 2012 the NWFW granted $99,268 towards the McArthur Lake Wildlife Safety Project, which would attempt to reduce collisions between wildlife and vehicles on Highway 95 near Bonners Ferry. The Nature Conservancy was to match the Foundation funds, and to work with the Kootenai Valley Resource Initiative to implement the improvements, which would be selected based on cost-benefit analysis. These could include wildlife fencing and systems to detect animals and alert motorists.

== Protection efforts ==
In December 2010 it was reported that Walmart had donated $1 million to The Nature Conservancy to protect two recovery zones for grizzly bears and habitat for over twenty species of high conservation need in the 3,727 acres (1,508 ha) McArthur Lake Wildlife Corridor. On 11 July 2013 The U.S. Forest Service announced a $4.1 million award to acquire a 6,847 acres (2,771 ha) conservation easement from Stimson Lumber Company within and adjoining the McArthur Lake Wildlife Corridor. The checkerboard forest property was the largest single property in the MLWC to remain unprotected.

In September 2016 about 5,568 acres (2,253 ha) of forest to the east of McArthur Lake between Sandpoint and Bonners Ferry was placed under conservation easements, which compensate landowners for limiting uses such as development and subdivision, but allow sustainable forestry to continue. They would benefit wildlife, help local economies, improve water quality and support recreation. Funding was by Forest Legacy Funds, which come from the Land and Water Conservation Fund. This receives royalties from energy companies in return for permission to drill for oil and gas on the Outer Continental Shelf. The Idaho Department of Lands (IDL) obtained the easements through partnership between the Molpus Woodlands Group, the Idaho Department of Fish and Game, The Nature Conservancy and the United States Forest Service.

In April 2018 it was announced that 5,000 acres (2,000 ha) of forest near Bonners Ferry would be placed under conservation easements. Half of the land was near Hall Mountain and half was in the McArthur Lake Wildlife Corridor east of McArthur Lake. Public access for hunting, hiking and berry picking would still be allowed.

== Sources ==
- 2013 Priority Land Acquisition Projects LWCF and Forest Legacy (PDF), The Wilderness Society
- Albers, Gwen (22 January 2009), "Mcarthur Lake Idaho's Top Spot For Wildlife Collisions", Bonners Ferry Herald
- Cabinet Yaak Wildlife Corridors, NFWF: National Fish and Wildlife Foundation
- Cernansky, Rachel (10 December 2010), "Walmart Adds 218,000 Acres to Wildlife Habitat Protection Program", treehugger.com
- Chilson, Peter (2003), "Right of Way", Audubon (6)
- Crapo, Mike (18 January 2012), Grant Launches McArthur Lake Wildlife Safety Project
- Forest Service Awards $44.2M to Conserve At-Risk Forests, U.S. Forest Service, 11 July 2013
- Francovich, Eli (3 April 2018), "Agreement protects 5,000 acres of North Idaho forestland", The Spokesman Review
- Inghram, Brent J.; Servheen, Gregg; Burak, Greg (2009), "Wildlife Habitat Connectivity – Planning and Design" (PDF), ICOET 2009 Proceedings
- Kellar, C. (6 May 2011), McArthur Lake Wildlife Corridor Project - Phase II: Boundary County and Bonner County, Idaho (PDF) (Map showing easements and other land use), The Trust for Public Land
- McArthur Lake, The Trust for Public Land
- McArthur Lake Wildlife Management Area, Idaho Fish and Game Watchable Wildlife Program
- "McArthur Lake Wildlife Corridor", Landscope.org, NatureServe
- McArthur Lake Wildlife Safety Project (PDF) (Map showing Wildlife Vehicle Collisions, 2003-2009), The Nature Conservancy
- "Nationally recognized North Idaho forests conserved, protected lands located in McArthur Lake Wildlife Corridor", Rexburg Standard Journal, 4 October 2016
