= Paddock Valley Dam =

Dam in Washington County, Idaho, United States

Coordinates: 44°11′54″N 116°35′56″W

Paddock Valley Dam is a dam in Washington County, Idaho.

This earthen dam was constructed in 1949 by the local Little Willow Irrigation District, with a height of 43 feet (13 m) and a length of 300 feet (91 m) long at its crest. It impounds Little Willow Creek for flood control and irrigation water storage, owned and operated by the local district.

The reservoir it creates, Paddock Valley Reservoir, has a normal surface area of 1,300 acres (530 ha) and maximum capacity of 36,400 acre-feet (44,900,000 m^{3}). Recreation includes fishing for Yellow Bullhead, Crappie, Largemouth Bass, Smallmouth Bass, Bluegill, and Punkinseed Sunfish. In 2008 the site was the tentative location of a nuclear power plant planned by MidAmerican Nuclear Energy, which was deemed not cost-effective.
