= Blackfoot River (Idaho) =

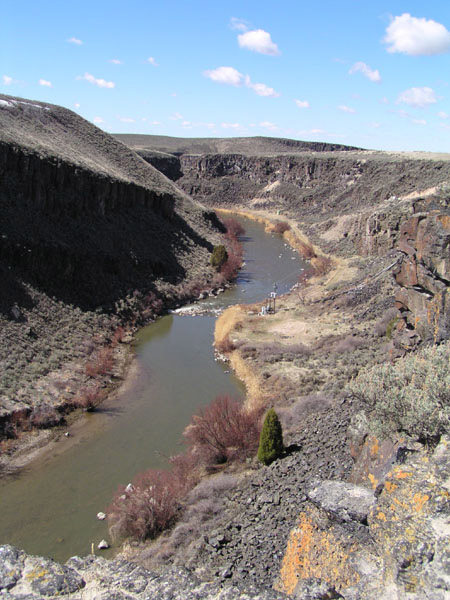
- Blackfoot River

- Location of the mouth of the Blackfoot River in Idaho Blackfoot River (Idaho) (the United States)

Location
- Country: United States
- State: Idaho
- Counties: Caribou County, Idaho, Bingham County, Idaho

Physical characteristics
- Source
  - location: northeast of Soda Springs, Caribou County, Idaho
  - coordinates: 42°50′22″N 111°18′32″W
  - elevation: 6,443 ft (1,964 m)
- Mouth: Snake River
  - location: southwest of Blackfoot, Bingham County, Idaho
  - coordinates: 43°07′38″N 112°30′22″W
  - elevation: 4,413 ft (1,345 m)
- Length: 135 mi (217 km)
- Basin size: 1,097 sq mi (2,840 km^{2})
- Discharge
  - location: near Blackfoot
  - average: 210 cu ft/s (5.9 m^{3}/s)
  - minimum: 0 cu ft/s (0 m^{3}/s)
  - maximum: 2,130 cu ft/s (60 m^{3}/s)

The Blackfoot River is a tributary of the Snake River in the U.S. state of Idaho. Formed by the confluence of Diamond Creek and Lanes Creek, it flows 135 miles (217 km) to its mouth at the Snake River. The river is part of the Columbia River Basin.

The Blackfoot River's drainage basin is approximately 1,097 square miles (2,841 km^{2}) in area. Its mean annual discharge, as measured at by USGS gage 13068501 (Combination Blackfoot River and Bypass Channel near Blackfoot, Idaho), is 210 cubic feet per second (5.95 m^{3}/s), with a maximum daily recorded flow of 2,130 cu ft/s (60.3 m^{3}/s), and a minimum of zero flow.

The river is named for the Blackfoot people even though they never lived in the area. It was first mapped by the Lewis and Clark expedition.

== Course ==
The Blackfoot River is formed by the joining of Diamond and Lanes creeks, in the Caribou-Targhee National Forest in Caribou County near Soda Springs, Idaho. It flows northwest through the Blackfoot Reservoir, which is used for irrigation and flood control, then west to join the Snake River in Bingham County.

The Blackfoot River's headwaters are very close to the headwaters of the Bear River and the Portneuf River. All three begin in a few square miles of relatively flat land near Soda Springs, from which some headwater streams flow north to the Blackfoot River, others south to the Bear River, and others west to the Portneuf River.

== Watershed ==
The region the Blackfoot River flows through is covered in all its lowest portions with flows of basalt which had their origin in the Blackfoot – Gem Valley lava field. The Blackfoot River flows from open marsh and grasslands near its source into the Blackfoot Narrows. The Blackfoot Narrows traverses a desert canyon of primarily sagebrush and juniper habitat: an excellent place to view birds of prey. Fishing for trout is usually good.

== See also ==
- List of rivers of Idaho
- List of longest streams of Idaho
- Tributaries of the Columbia River
