= National Inventory of Dams =

The National Inventory of Dams (NID) is a congressionally authorized database documenting dams in the United States and its territories. It is maintained and published by the US Army Corps of Engineers. It contains information about each dam's location, size, purpose, type, last inspection, regulatory facts, and factors affecting dam robustness and flood hazard potential such as reservoir capacity, construction type, and maximum expected flood event flows. The database contains some encoded values which require a key to interpret which may be found at the U.S. Department of Transportation website in xlsx format.
