= Boise National Forest =

National forest in the US state of Idaho

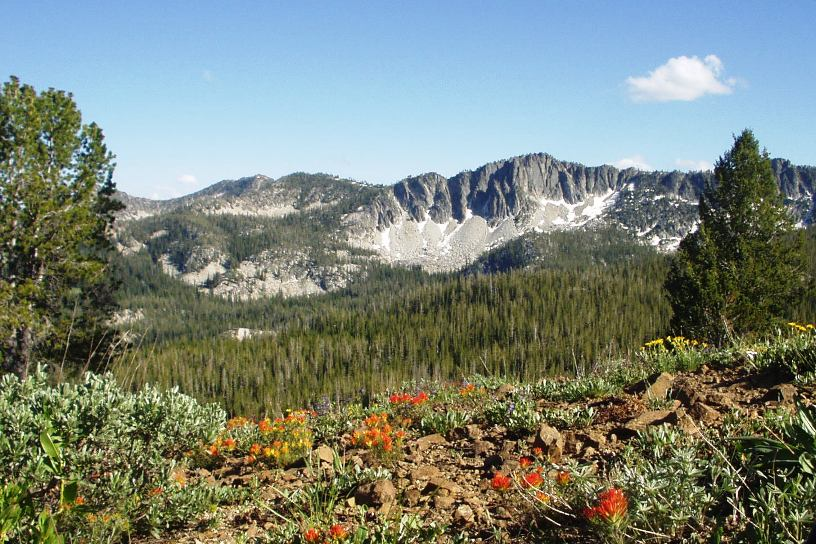
- Trinity Mountains in Boise National Forest

- Location within Idaho Location within the United States
- Location: Ada, Boise, Elmore, Gem, Valley, and Washington counties, Idaho, United States
- Nearest city: Boise, Idaho
- Coordinates: 43°48′45″N 115°33′45″W
- Area: 2,203,703 acres (8,918.07 km^{2}) (proclaimed)
- Established: July 1, 1908; 118 years ago
- Visitors: 1,180,000 (in 2009)
- Governing body: U.S. Forest Service
- Website: www.fs.usda.gov/boise

Boise National Forest is a National Forest covering 2,203,703 acres (8,918.07 km^{2}) of the U.S. state of Idaho. Created on July 1, 1908, from part of Sawtooth National Forest, it is managed by the U.S. Forest Service as five units: the Cascade, Emmett, Idaho City, Lowman, and Mountain Home ranger districts.

The Idaho Batholith underlies most of Boise National Forest, forming the forest's Boise, Salmon River, and West mountain ranges; the forest reaches a maximum elevation of 9,730 feet (2,970 m) on Steel Mountain. Common land cover includes sagebrush steppe and spruce-fir forests; there are 9,600 miles (15,400 km) of streams and rivers and 15,400 acres (62 km^{2}) of lakes and reservoirs. Boise National Forest contains 75 percent of the known populations of Sacajawea's bitterroot, a flowering plant endemic to Idaho.

The Shoshone people occupied the forest before European settlers arrived in the early 19th century. Many of the early settlers were trappers and prospectors before gold was discovered in 1862. After the 1860s Boise Basin gold rush ended, mining of tungsten, silver, antimony, and gold continued in the forest until the mid-twentieth century. Recreation facilities include over 70 campgrounds, whitewater and flatwater boating, cabin rentals, and 1,300 miles (2,100 km) of trails for hiking, biking, horseback riding, and motorized off-road vehicle use. The Forest Service has an objective to maintain timber, range, water, recreation, and wildlife for multiple use and sustained yield of its resources.

== History ==
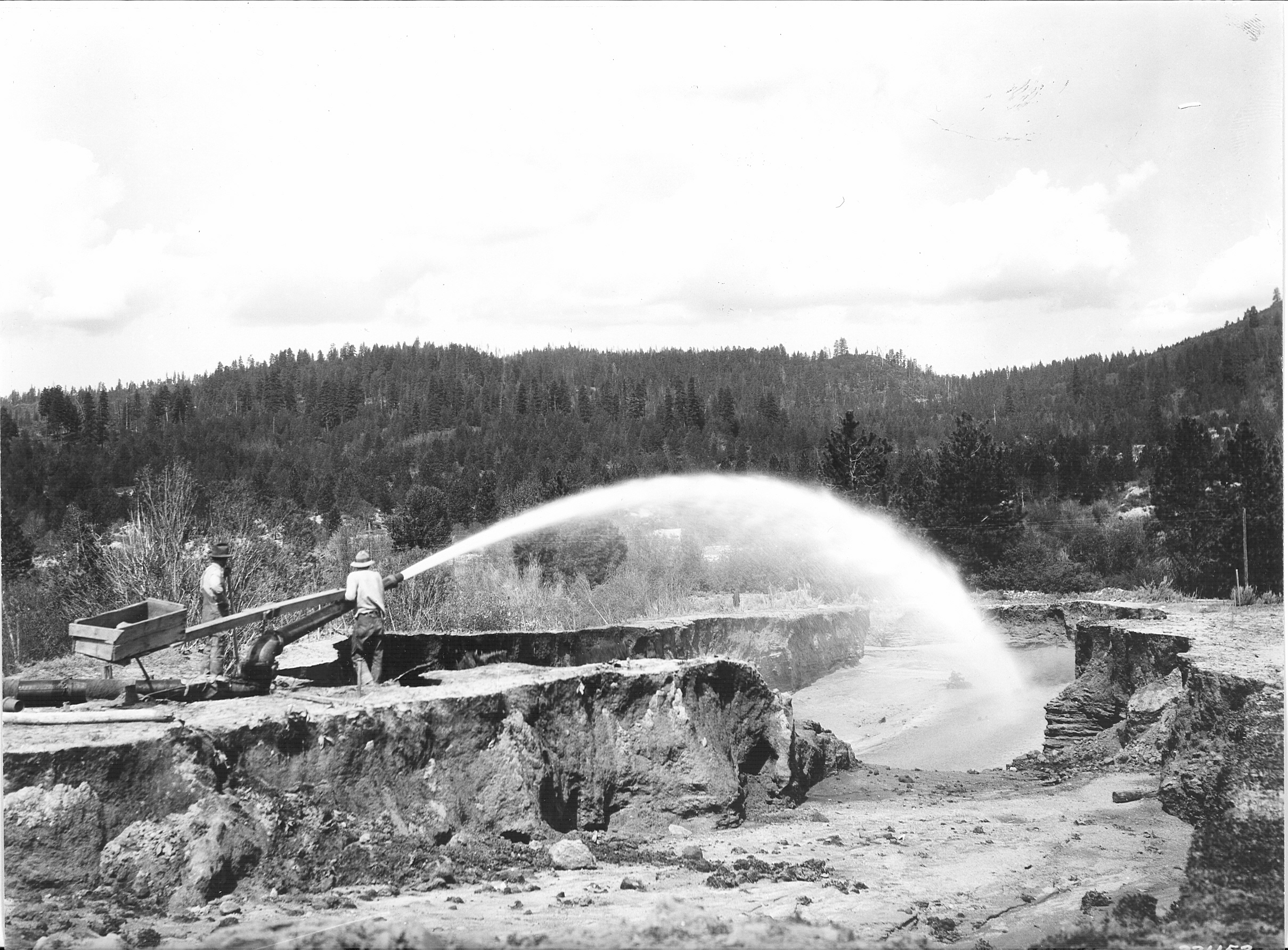
A hydraulic jet being used to mine placers in the Boise Basin in 1929

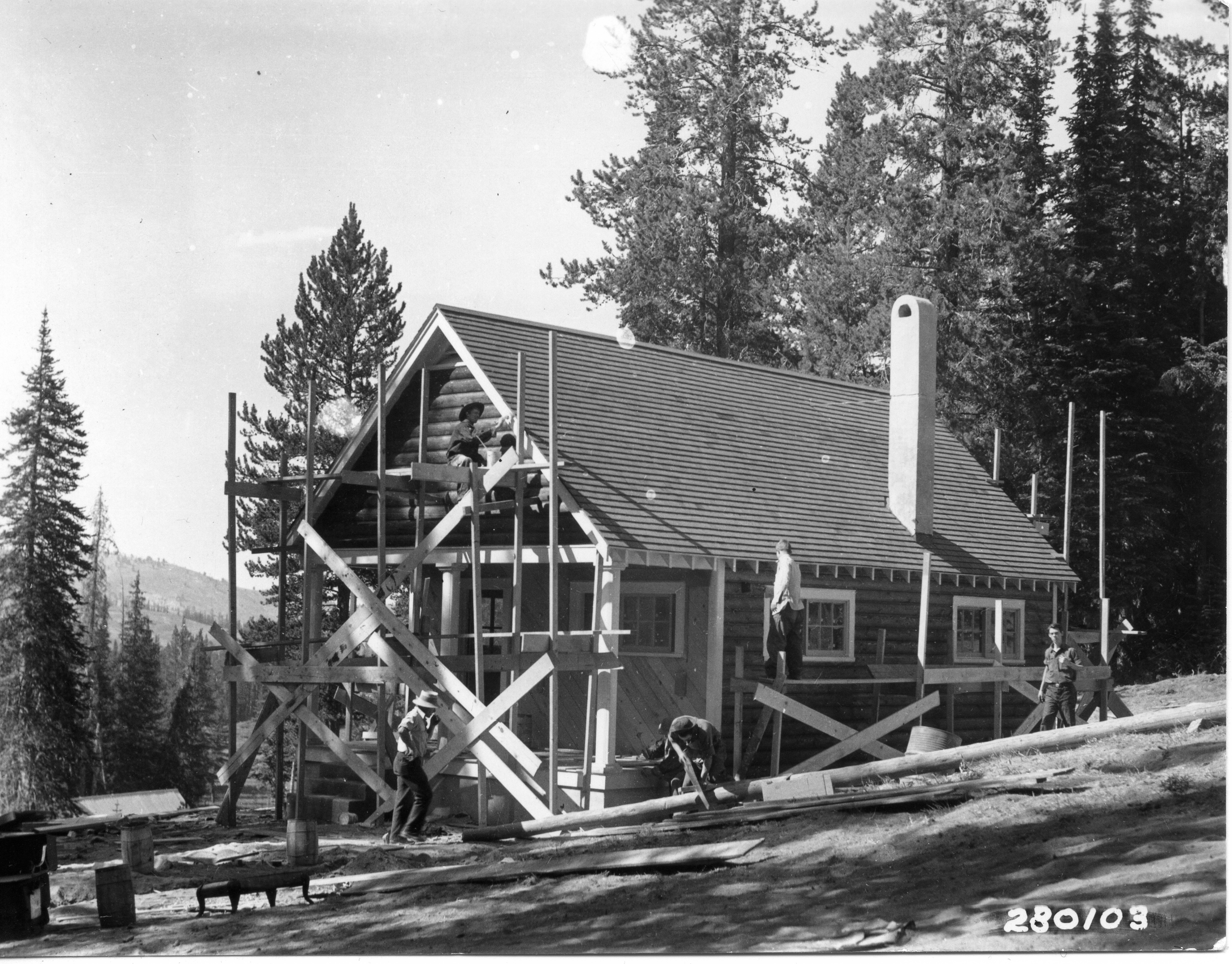
The CCC constructed many structures throughout the forest from 1933 until 1942, including this guard station in 1933.

Archaeological evidence indicates that human habitation in Idaho began towards the end of the last ice age: bone fragments about 10,000 years old have been found in Wilson Butte Cave, an inflationary cave on the Snake River Plain believed to have been occupied by indigenous people until as recently as the 17th century. A change of climate around 7000 years ago dried up much of the Great Basin, forcing the Shoshone people northward into the mountainous areas of central Idaho. Most of what is now Boise National Forest was sparsely inhabited by Native Americans, and several archaeological sites, including campsites, rock shelters, burial grounds, and pictographs have been found along rivers in the area. Trappers and fur traders of European descent first arrived in the area in the early 1800s, starting with John Jacob Astor's Pacific Fur Company in October 1811. Donald Mackenzie and Francois Payette trapped in the area of Boise National Forest in 1819. By 1840, the fur trade was coming to an end, but the westward migration on the Oregon Trail, which passed south of the forest, was beginning. The first settlers moved into the mountains in the 1860s after gold was discovered in Idaho, which forced many of the Shoshone out and led to conflicts throughout the state, including the Bannock War in southern Idaho.

Prospectors George Grimes and Moses Splawn were the first to discover gold in the forest at the eponymous Grimes Creek on August 2, 1862. Subsequent gold discoveries at Rocky Bar in 1863 and Atlanta in 1864 increased the rush of people to Idaho, and in 1863 Idaho City, with a population of 6,267, surpassed Portland, Oregon as the largest city in the Pacific Northwest. The Idaho gold rush was largely over by 1870, and the population of the Boise Basin fell from 16,000 to 3,500. In 1898 the forest's first gold dredge was built in Placerville and followed by several others. By 1951, when the last dredges shut down, at least 2.3 million ounces (65.2 million grams) of gold had been produced from the Boise Basin area. Silver was mined along the Crooked River from 1882 until 1921, but a silver mine at Silver Mountain proved unsuccessful. Following a shortage of mercury during World War II, mines in the Stibnite area became the country's largest producer of tungsten and second largest source of mercury. The most important known placer deposit of niobium and tantalum in the United States is located in Bear Valley. From 1953 until 1959, dredges there produced $12.5 million ($138 million today) in niobium, tantalum, and uranium. Other minerals mined in the forest include antimony and molybdenum.

=== U.S. Forest Service ===
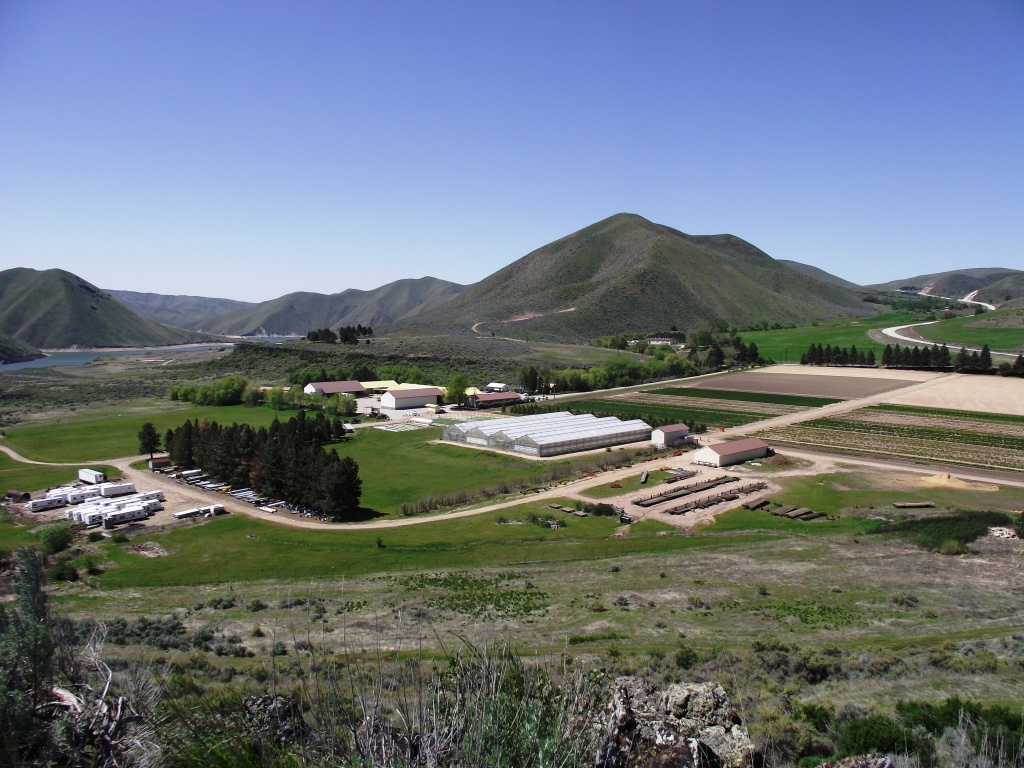
Lucky Peak Nursery grows trees for restoration projects throughout the Intermountain region.

Boise National Forest was created on July 1, 1908, from part of Sawtooth National Forest, and originally covered 1,147,360 acres (4,643.2 km^{2}). By the Forest Reserve Act of 1891, the U.S. Congress granted the U.S. President the authority to establish forest reserves out of Public Domain Lands that were subject to disposal (homesteads, sales, etc.) administered by the United States General Land Office, which had been placed under the authority of the U.S. Department of the Interior in 1849. With the passage of the Transfer Act of 1905, forest reserves were transferred to the U.S. Department of Agriculture in the newly created U.S. Forest Service. Present-day Boise National Forest was first protected as part of two forest reserves by proclamations issued by President Theodore Roosevelt: Sawtooth Forest Reserve (created on May 29, 1905, and expanded on November 6, 1906) and Payette Forest Reserve (created on June 3, 1905). After forest reserves were renamed national forests in 1908, Boise National Forest was split from Sawtooth National Forest into an independent national forest. Emile Grandjean was the forest's first supervisor, serving from 1908 to 1922. On April 1, 1944, the entirety of what was then Payette National Forest was transferred to Boise National Forest, and simultaneously Weiser and Idaho national forests were combined to reestablish the present-day Payette National Forest, which is to the north of Boise National Forest. In 1933 the Boise Basin Experimental Forest was created on 8,740 acres (35.4 km^{2}) of the forest near Idaho City to study the management of ponderosa pine. The Lucky Peak Nursery was established in 1959 to produce trees for planting on burned or logged lands on the national forests of the Intermountain region.

After the creation of the Civilian Conservation Corps (CCC) in 1933, nine camps and eight subcamps were set up in Boise National Forest, but the number of camps was reduced from 1934 until the program was closed in 1942. Work conducted by the CCC included fire suppression, fish habitat improvement, and construction of guard houses, fire lookouts, campgrounds, roads, and trails, among other facilities.

== Management ==
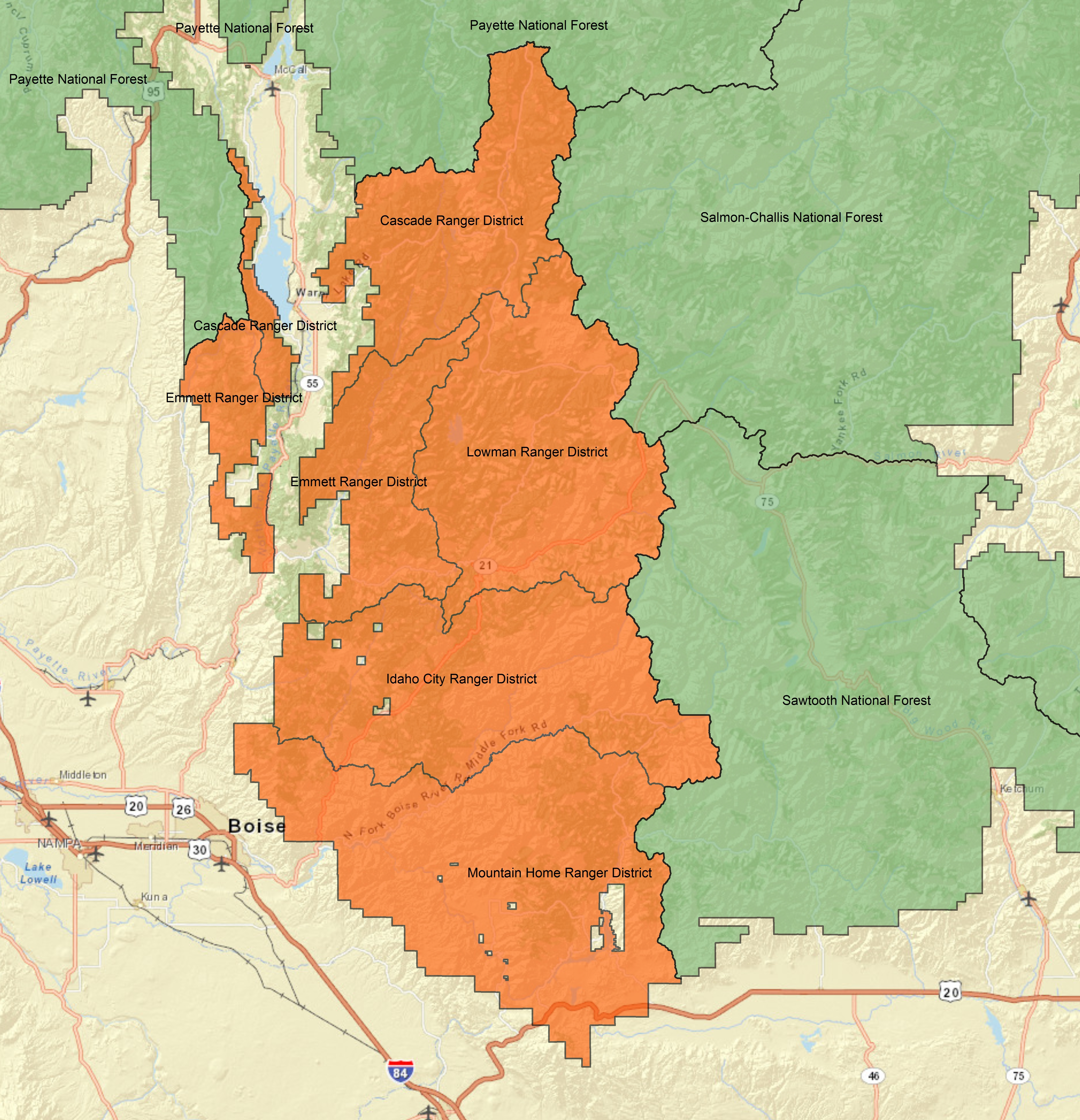
Map of Boise (orange) and surrounding national forests (green)

Boise National Forest is managed by the U.S. Forest Service, an agency within the Department of Agriculture, as five units called ranger districts. The ranger districts are Cascade (400,000 acres or 1,600 square kilometers), Emmett (350,000 acres or 1,400 square kilometers), Idaho City (400,000 acres), Lowman (400,000 acres), and Mountain Home (650,000 acres or 2,600 square kilometers); each has an office in their respective cities and is managed by a district ranger, while forest headquarters are located in the city of Boise. Congress proclaimed 2,648,273 acres (10,717.18 km^{2}) of Idaho part of Boise National Forest, but the forest manages only 2,203,703 acres (8,918.07 km^{2}). The proclaimed boundary is set and can only be changed by Congress whereas the administered boundary can be shifted among adjacent national forests without congressional approval. For management (and from the visitor's perspective) the forest's boundaries are its administered area.

Land areas of Boise National Forest administered by or proclaimed part of another national forest
National forest		Location
Administered by	Proclaimed part of	
Boise	Payette	East of Council
Boise	Sawtooth	Between Mountain Home and Fairfield
Boise/Salmon-Challis (joint)	Boise	Southwest corner of the Frank Church–River of No Return Wilderness
Payette	Boise	Stibnite region of the upper East Fork South Fork Salmon River drainage
Salmon-Challis	Boise	Indian, Pistol, and Elkhorn creek drainages of the Frank Church–River of No Return Wilderness
Sawtooth	Boise	Sawtooth Wilderness in Sawtooth National Recreation Area (150,071 acres or 607.32 km^{2})

== Geography and geology ==
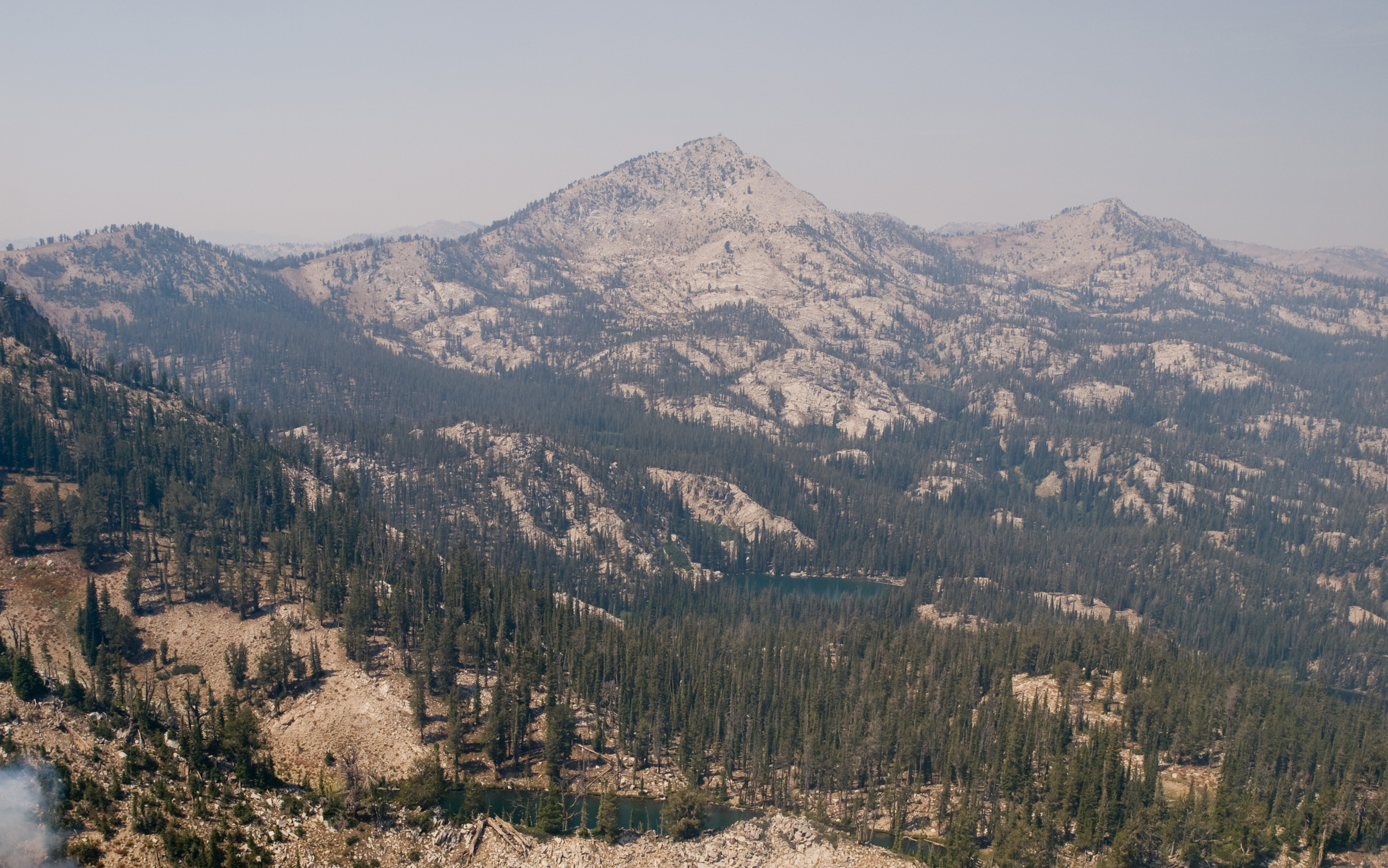
Trinity Mountain is the second highest point in the forest.

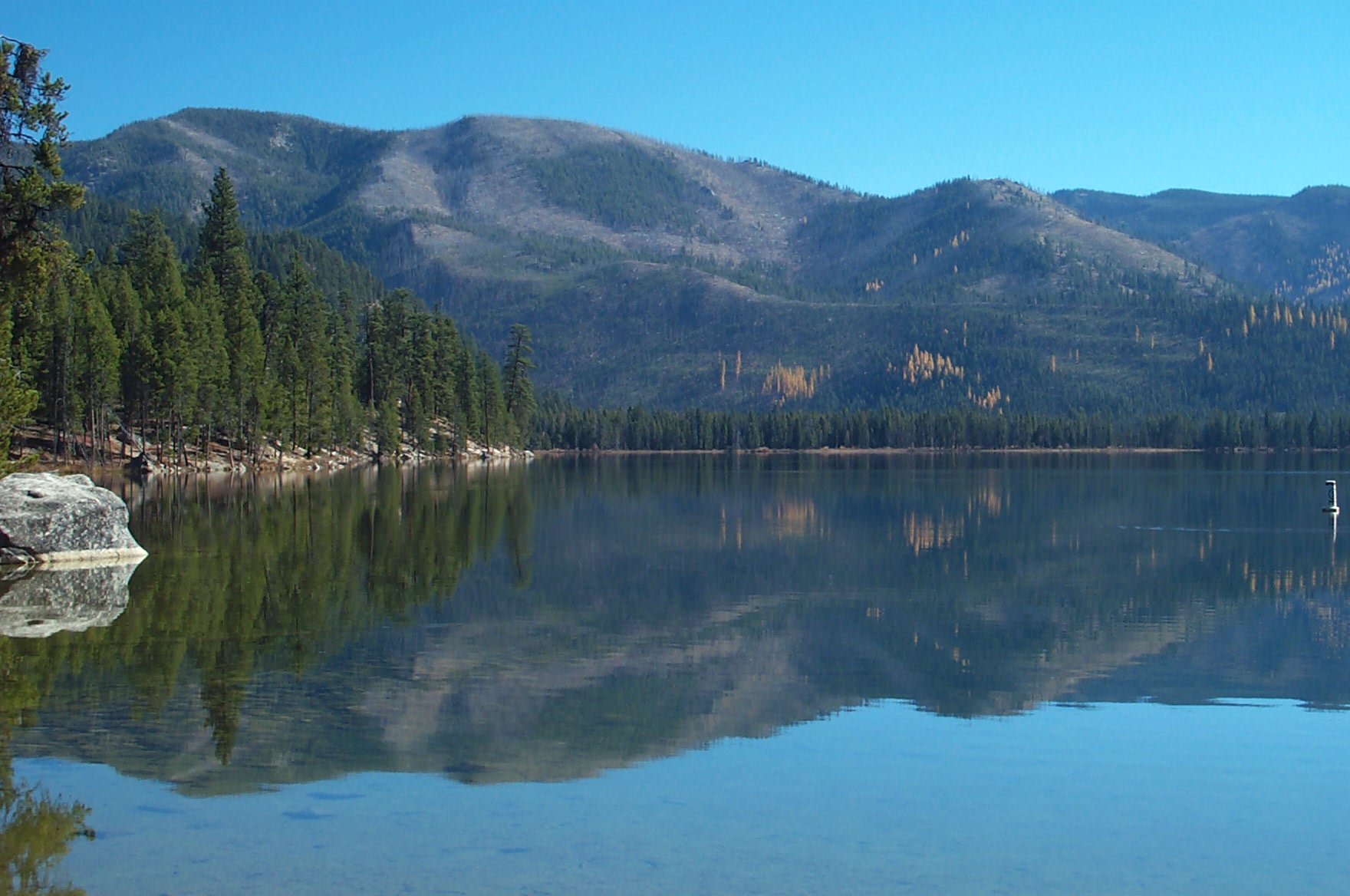
Warm Lake is the largest natural lake in Boise National Forest.

Elevations in the forest range from 2,800 feet (850 m) in the North Fork Payette River Canyon to 9,730 feet (2,970 m) at the top of Steel Mountain, a gain of 6,930 feet (2,110 m). The forest contains several subranges of the Rocky Mountains, including the Boise, Salmon River, and West mountain ranges. Much of the forest is underlain by the Idaho Batholith, and the forest is dominated by granitic rock, but intrusions of basalt can be found to the west and other volcanic rocks to the south.

North of the South Fork Payette River and east of the North Fork Payette River, the forest is part of the Salmon River Mountains, which extend north and east outside the forest's boundaries. The South Fork Salmon River Range and the North Fork Range are subranges of the Salmon River Mountains within Boise National Forest. The Boise Mountains cover much of the southern portion of the forest and contain the forest's highest point, Steel Mountain, but the range's highest point, Two Point Mountain, lies outside of the forest's boundary. The Trinity Mountains are a subrange in southeastern part of the Boise Mountains that reach their peak at 9,451 feet (2,881 m) on Trinity Mountain. The westernmost portion of the forest south and west of Lake Cascade are part of the West Mountains, which reach their highest point at 8,320 feet (2,540 m) on Snowbank Mountain. The Danskin Mountains are a smaller range on the forest's southern border that run northwest to southeast.

=== Waterways ===
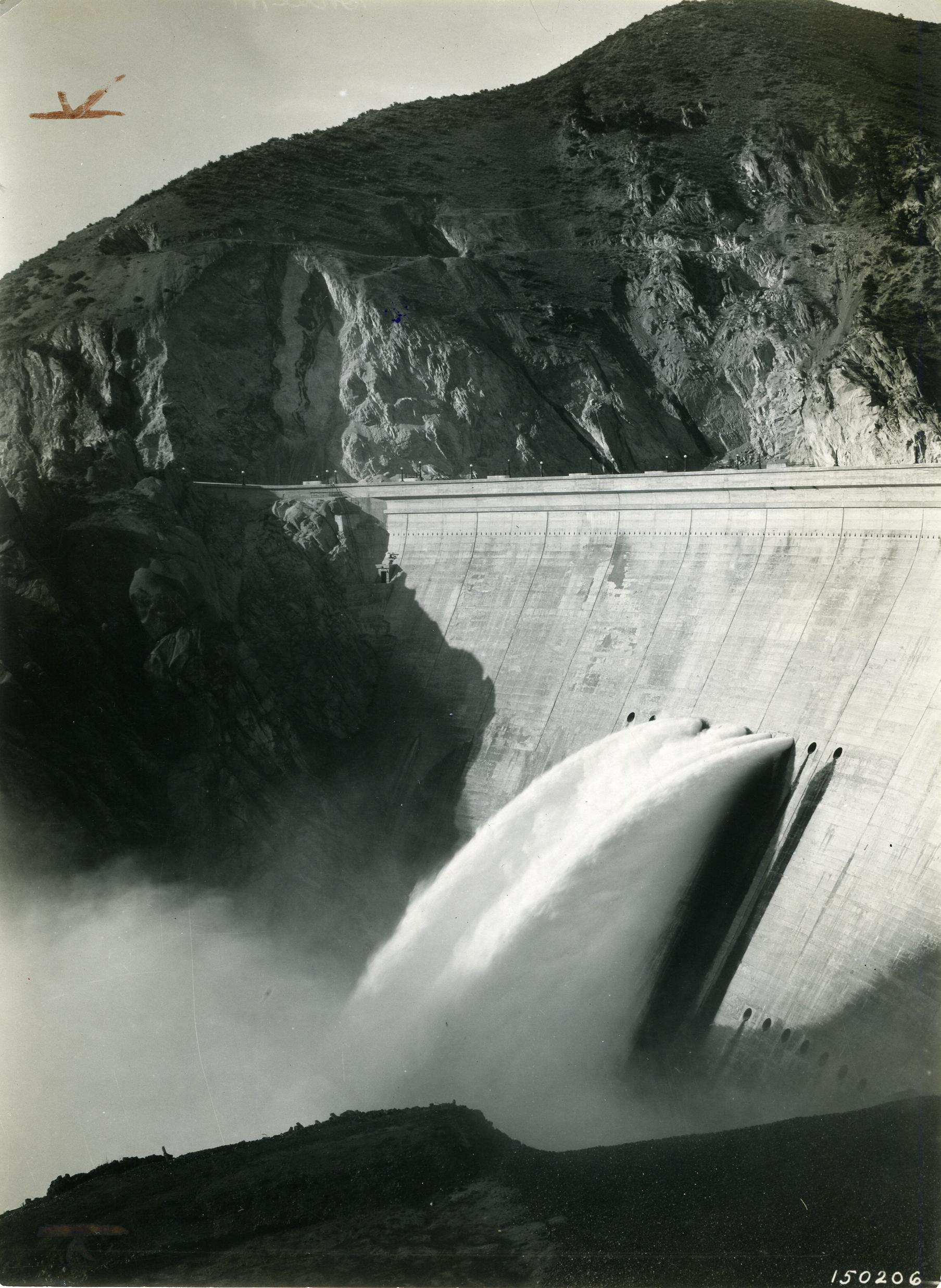
The Arrowrock Dam, pictured in 1938, was the tallest dam in the world from 1915 until 1924.

There are an estimated 9,600 miles (15,400 km) of perennial and intermittent streams and 15,400 acres (62 km^{2}) of lakes and reservoirs in the forest. The Forest Service provides access to and recreation opportunities at the seven reservoirs it borders, although it does not own or manage them. There are numerous natural lakes in the forest, most of which are tarns created by alpine glaciers during the Pleistocene. The largest, Warm Lake, is 26 miles (42 km) east of Cascade in Valley County; many of the smaller lakes are in the Trinity and West mountains. Annual water yield on the forest is estimated at 4.1 million acre-feet (5.1 billion cubic meters). The southern portion of the forest is drained by the Boise River, the central and western portions by the Payette River, northeastern portion by the Salmon River, and far western portions of the Emmett Ranger District by the Weiser River. All four rivers are tributaries of the Snake River, which itself is a tributary of the Columbia River in the Pacific basin.

Dams and reservoirs of Boise National Forest
Dam	River	Type	Height		Reservoir	Volume		Generating capacity	Owner	Built
			feet	meters		acre-feet	km^{3}	MW		
Anderson Ranch Dam	South Fork Boise River	Earthfill	456	139	Anderson Ranch Reservoir	503,500	0.6211	40	U.S. Bureau of Reclamation	1950
Arrowrock Dam	Boise River	Concrete arch	350	110	Arrowrock Reservoir	300,850	0.37109	0	U.S. Bureau of Reclamation	1915
Cascade Dam	North Fork Payette River	Earthfill	107	33	Lake Cascade	693,100	0.8549	12.4	U.S. Bureau of Reclamation	1948
Deadwood Dam	Deadwood River	Concrete arch	165	50	Deadwood Reservoir	154,000	0.190	0	U.S. Bureau of Reclamation	1931
Little Camas Dam	Little Camas Creek	Earthfill	44	13	Little Camas Reservoir	18,400	0.0227	0	Mountain Home Irrigation District	1912
Lucky Peak Dam	Boise River	Earthfill	340	100	Lucky Peak Lake	307,000	0.379	101	U.S. Army Corps of Engineers	1955
Sage Hen Dam	Sage Hen Creek	Earthfill	38	12	Sage Hen Reservoir	5,210	0.00643	0	Squaw Creek Irrigation Company	1938

== Climate ==
Daily high temperatures range from 9 to 29 °F (−13 to −2 °C) in winter to 80 to 90 °F (27 to 32 °C) in summer, while lower elevations can experience conditions over 100 °F (38 °C). Idaho's mountain ranges can block Arctic air in the winter, but when cold air masses do enter the area, they sometimes stagnate in the Snake and Salmon river valleys, causing very cold temperatures to persist. Summer and fall are generally dry, while intense short-duration thunderstorms can occur in late spring and early summer as atmospheric moisture interacts with warm temperatures and steep topography via orographic lifting. During winter, warm, moist air from the Pacific Ocean often brings rain at lower elevations in addition to snowfall throughout the forest. The influence of these Pacific maritime air masses increases as latitude increases in the forest. Average annual snowfall ranges from 55 inches (140 cm) in drier areas and at lower elevations to 70 inches (180 cm) in wetter locations and higher elevations. The growing season within the forest ranges from over 150 days in lower elevations to less than 30 days in alpine areas.

== Natural resources ==
Boise National Forest is within the Idaho Batholith ecoregion, which is a level III ecoregion in the larger level I Northwestern Forested Mountains. In addition to species listed or proposed for listing as threatened or endangered under the Endangered Species Act, the Forest Service maintains an independent listing of sensitive species for which it is directed to "develop and implement management practices to ensure that species do not become threatened or endangered because of Forest Service actions." As of February 2013 there were 27 species in Boise National Forest listed as sensitive species: 6 mammals, 1 amphibian, 1 fish, 13 birds, and 6 plants.

=== Flora ===
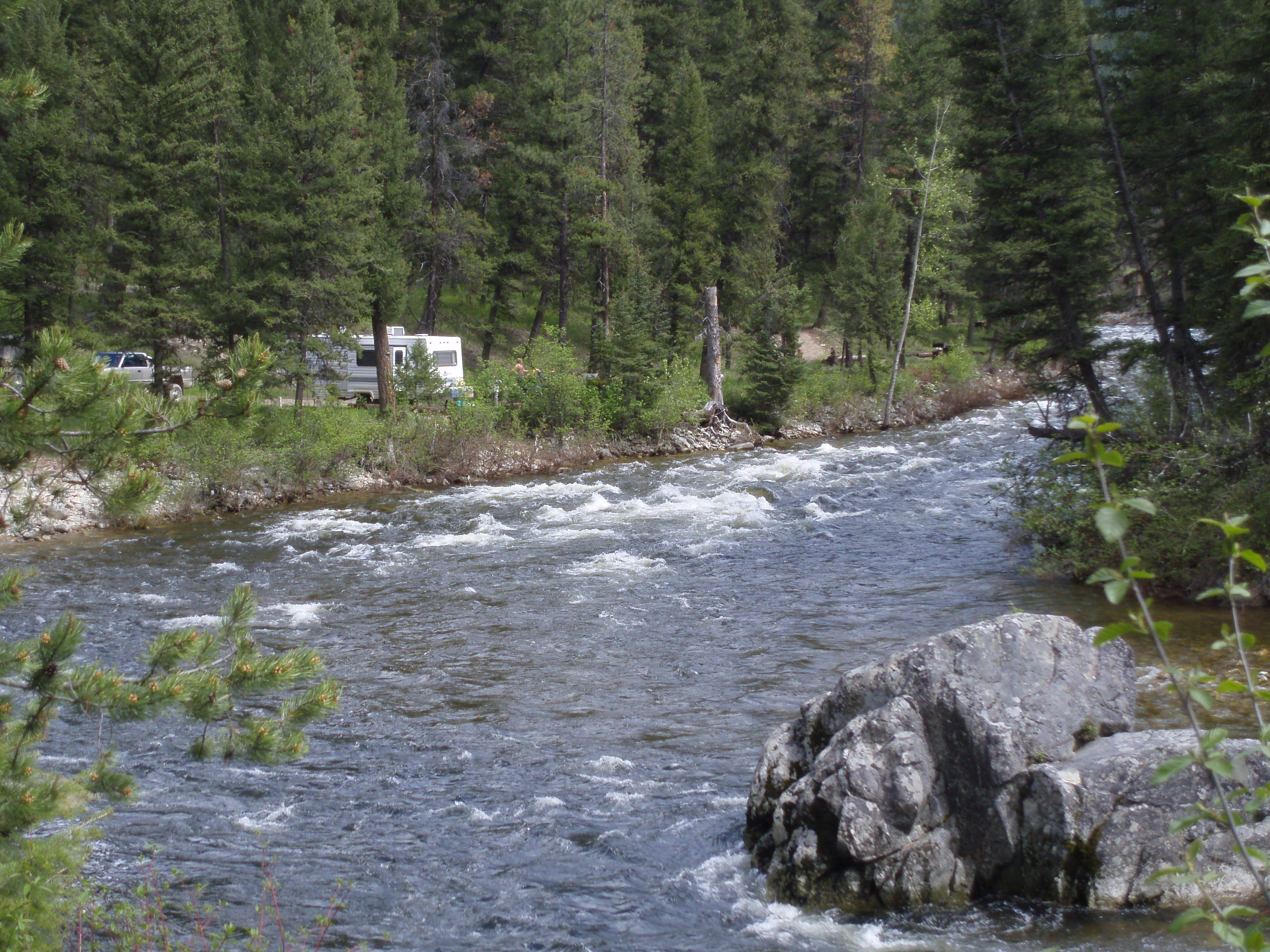
The riparian zone along rivers can be quite narrow, quickly transitioning to drier Douglas fir and ponderosa pine forests.

An estimated 76 percent of Boise National Forest is forest, which according to the Forest Service is considered land capable of supporting trees on at least 50 percent of its area. The forests are primarily coniferous evergreens, dominated by Douglas fir and ponderosa and lodgepole pines at lower elevations and Engelmann spruce, subalpine fir, and whitebark pine at higher elevations. Grand fir and western larch (a coniferous deciduous tree) grow in the northern part of the forest where there are moister conditions. Quaking aspen, a broadleaf deciduous tree, grows both in stands among conifers and in monotypic stands throughout the forest at elevations above 5,000 feet (1,500 m). Non-forested areas occupy 23 percent of the forest, primarily on south-facing slopes, lower elevations in the forest's southern latitudes, or high-elevation areas and are dominated by grasses, forbs, or shrubs.

Sacajawea's bitterroot is a plant species endemic to central Idaho, including parts of Boise National Forest, being found nowhere else in the world. Only about two dozen populations of the plant are known to exist, and three-quarters of these are in Boise National Forest. It is usually found at elevations ranging from 5,000 feet (1,500 m) to 9,500 feet (2,900 m) above sea level and produces white flowers shortly after snowmelt.

Boise National Forest is directed by the U.S. Forest Service to "control the establishment, spread, or invasion of non-indigenous plant species in otherwise healthy native vegetative ecosystems." The forest's plan addresses the need to control invasive plants, and management efforts include chemical, mechanical, and biological control methods. Invasive plants that are of particular concern in Boise National Forest include spotted knapweed, yellow star-thistle, rush skeletonweed, and leafy spurge, among others.

=== Vegetation communities ===
The warmest, driest forested areas occur on south-facing slopes from 3,000 feet (910 m) to 6,500 feet (2,000 m). Due to the occurrence of frequent non-lethal fires, ponderosa pine dominates these forests alongside Douglas fir. The understory consists of bluebunch wheatgrass, Idaho fescue, mountain snowberry, and bitterbrush in drier areas and elk sedge, pinegrass, white spirea, mallow ninebark, and common snowberry at higher elevations.

In cool, moist areas ranging from 4,800 feet (1,500 m) to 6,800 feet (2,100 m), Douglas fir is predominant. Lodgepole pine and quaking aspen may be found alongside Douglas fir in cooler areas, both moist and dry, but particularly where frost pockets form. Understories in this forest type are dominated by mountain maple, mountain ash, and blue huckleberry in moister areas and white spirea, common snowberry, elk sedge, and pinegrass in drier areas. Between 3,400 feet (1,000 m) and 6,500 feet (2,000 m) in the moist northern parts of the forest, grand fir is predominant and western larch is one of the first trees to become established during ecological succession following disturbances, whereas understories consist of mountain maple, mountain ash, blue huckleberry, and mallow ninebark. Subalpine fir dominates from 4,800 feet (1,500 m) to 7,500 feet (2,300 m) along with mountain maple, serviceberry, Scouler's willow, Sitka alder, menziesia, Utah honeysuckle, and mountain ash.

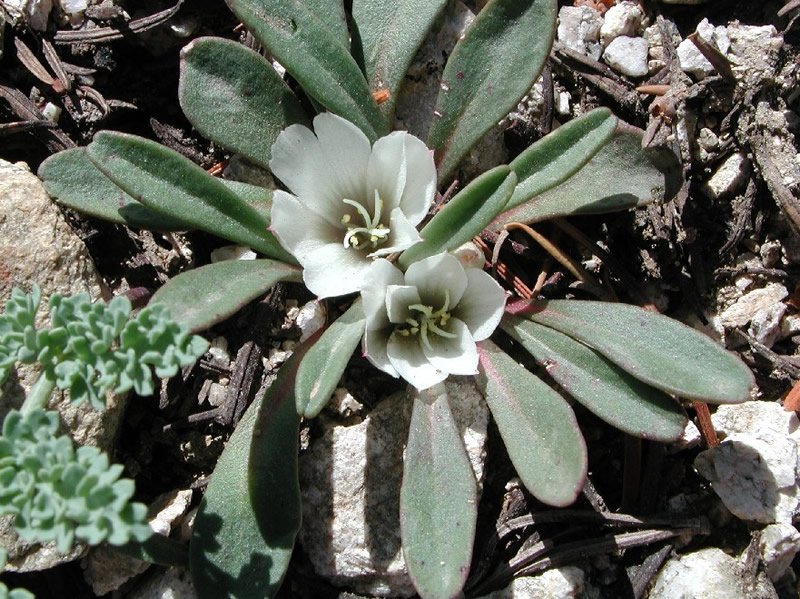
Sacajawea's bitterroot is a small plant that grows to be 1.2 to 2.75 inches (30 to 70 mm) tall.

Lodgepole pine dominates in cold, dry areas from 5,200 feet (1,600 m) to 9,200 feet (2,800 m). The understory in lodgepole pine forests can be sparse but includes grasses, forbs, huckleberries, and grouse whortleberry, although fires in these forests are typically lethal to trees and understories alike. At the highest elevations, forests consist of subalpine fir alongside whitebark pine and Engelmann spruce. Grasses and forbs tolerant to freezing throughout the growing season occupy the understory.

Sagebrush typically dominates drier, non-forested areas at lower elevations. Species that commonly occur with sagebrush include Sandberg bluegrass, wild onion, milk vetches, bluebunch wheatgrass, bitterbrush, gray horsebrush, green rabbitbrush, and others. In riparian areas below 5,500 feet (1,700 m), trees such as black cottonwood, narrowleaf cottonwood, thinleaf alder, water birch, and mountain maple grow with shrubs including chokeberry and willows. Riparian areas in largely treeless habitats such as sagebrush steppe primarily consist of willows along with thinleaf alder, chokecherry, mountain maple, shrubby cinquefoil, fireweed, saxifrage, and grasses.

=== Fauna ===
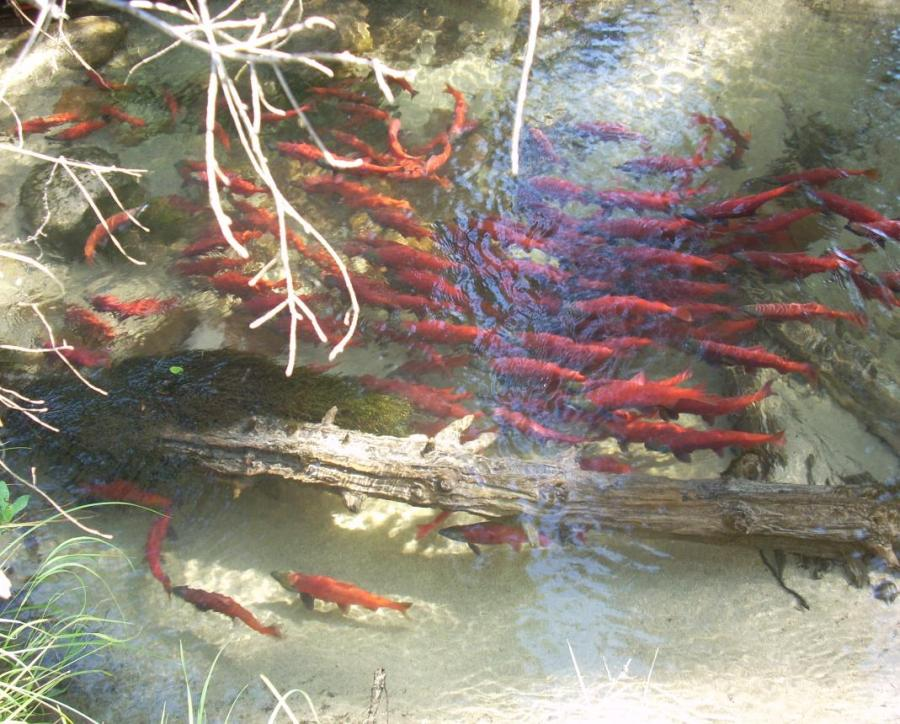
Kokanee salmon in their red spawning coloration

Habitats in Boise National Forest support nearly 300 terrestrial vertebrate species and 28 fish species. The most common large animals are mule deer and elk, but other mammals present include moose, black bears, cougar, coyote, yellow-bellied marmot, beaver, porcupine, Canadian lynx, mountain goat, pika, river otter, muskrat, pronghorn, mink, bobcat, marten, and timber wolves.

Timber wolves are top predators that were reintroduced amidst controversy to central Idaho in the mid-1990s to restore ecosystem stability. The wolves have since expanded their range and established packs in most of Boise National Forest. Wolves and mountain lions are the forest's top large mammal predators and have no predators of their own except humans. Most of the forest's native mammal species are present in the forest, with the exception of grizzly bears, which have become locally extinct, and plans for their reintroduction to central Idaho have been proposed since the 1990s but have not progressed.

Of the 28 fish species present in the forest, 11 are not native and have been introduced by humans. Rainbow trout, chinook salmon, westslope cutthroat trout, bull trout, and mountain whitefish are all native to some of the forest's waterways, while brook trout are a common invasive species that compete with the forest's salmonids. The forest's management indicator species is bull trout because they are sensitive to habitat changes and depend on specific habitat conditions. Sockeye salmon are native to the Salmon River watershed in the northern part of the forest, but dam construction on the Columbia and Snake rivers has hampered the migration of this anadromous fish and caused its population to collapse. Warm Lake supports the forest's only native population of Kokanee salmon, the resident (non-migratory) form of sockeye salmon. However, due to introductions by humans, Anderson Ranch, Arrowrock, Lucky Peak, and Deadwood reservoirs now support populations of Kokanee salmon. To provide additional recreational fishing opportunities, the Idaho Department of Fish and Game stocks several of the forest's waterways with rainbow trout, while reservoirs are also stocked with Kokanee or chinook salmon and Lake Cascade is stocked with coho salmon and steelhead, the anadromous form of rainbow trout.

Over 270 bird species have been observed in central Idaho, including 36 accidental species – those that are not normally found in the region but have been observed on at least one occasion. Golden eagles and greater sage-grouse can be found over sagebrush steppe, whereas bald eagles can be seen along rivers. The Forest Service has listed northern goshawks, flammulated owls, and white-headed woodpeckers as a sensitive species in the forest.

The few amphibians present in the forest include the Rocky Mountain tailed frog, long-toed salamander, and Columbia spotted frog, which has been listed as a sensitive species. Common snakes include bullsnakes, garter snakes, and rubber boas.

=== Fire ecology ===
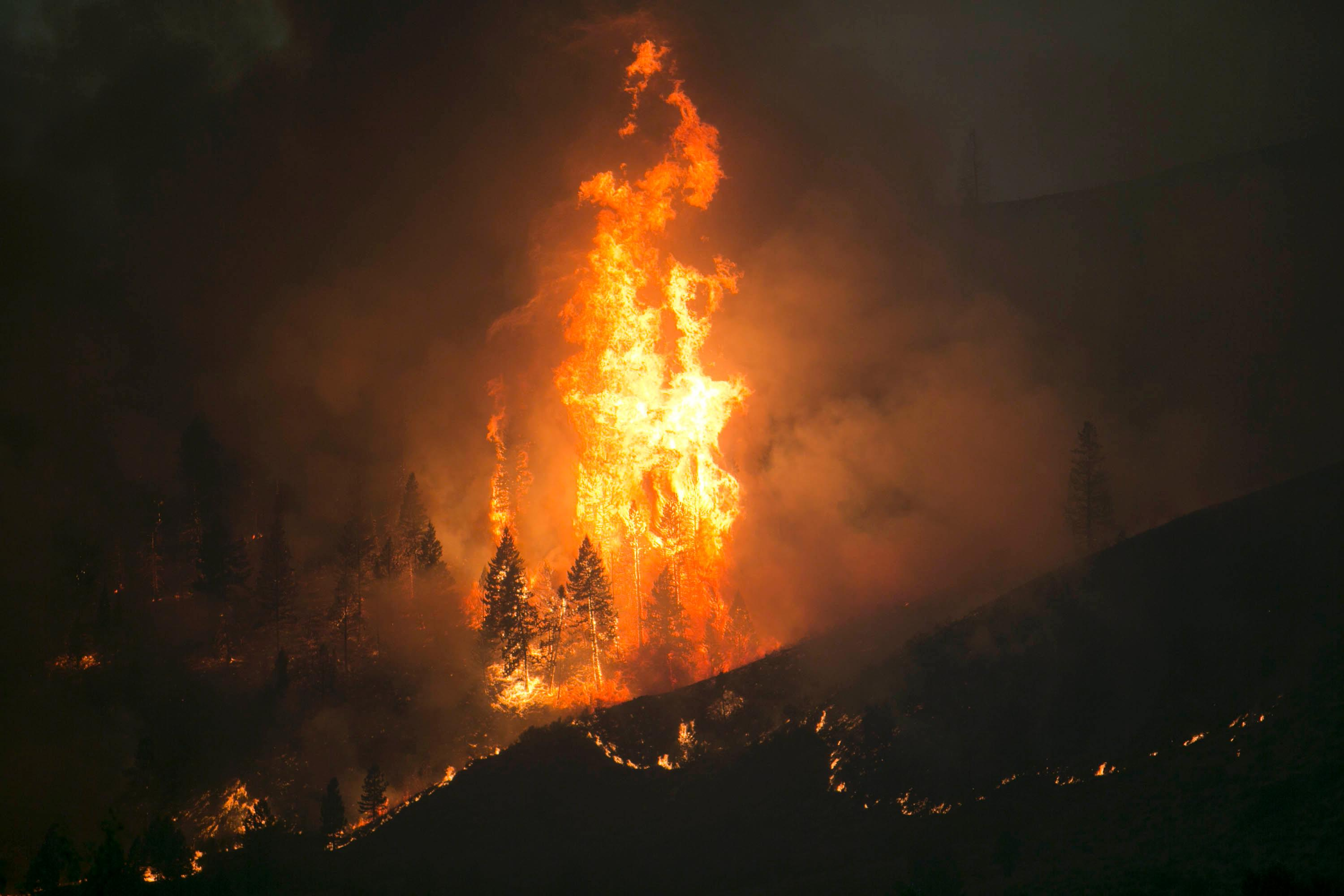
The Elk Complex Fire burned 146,832 acres (594.21 km^{2}) in 2013.

Boise National Forest's 2010 forest plan recognizes that fire and other disturbances play important roles in maintaining the character and function of ecosystems. However, previous management strategies (as recently as the 1990 forest plan) treated fire as an undesirable process, and the Organic Act of 1897 explicitly stated that forests were to be protected from destruction by fire. In historic conditions fires naturally occurred on the landscape; the suppression of fires allowed dead trees to accumulate in excess of historic levels and land cover types to change, such as a shift to higher shrub and tree densities. An estimated 14 percent of the land in Boise National Forest has been affected by fires since the early 1990s, and about 10 percent of the land capable of timber production was burned so severely that land cover shifted from forest to grass and shrubland (as of 2010).

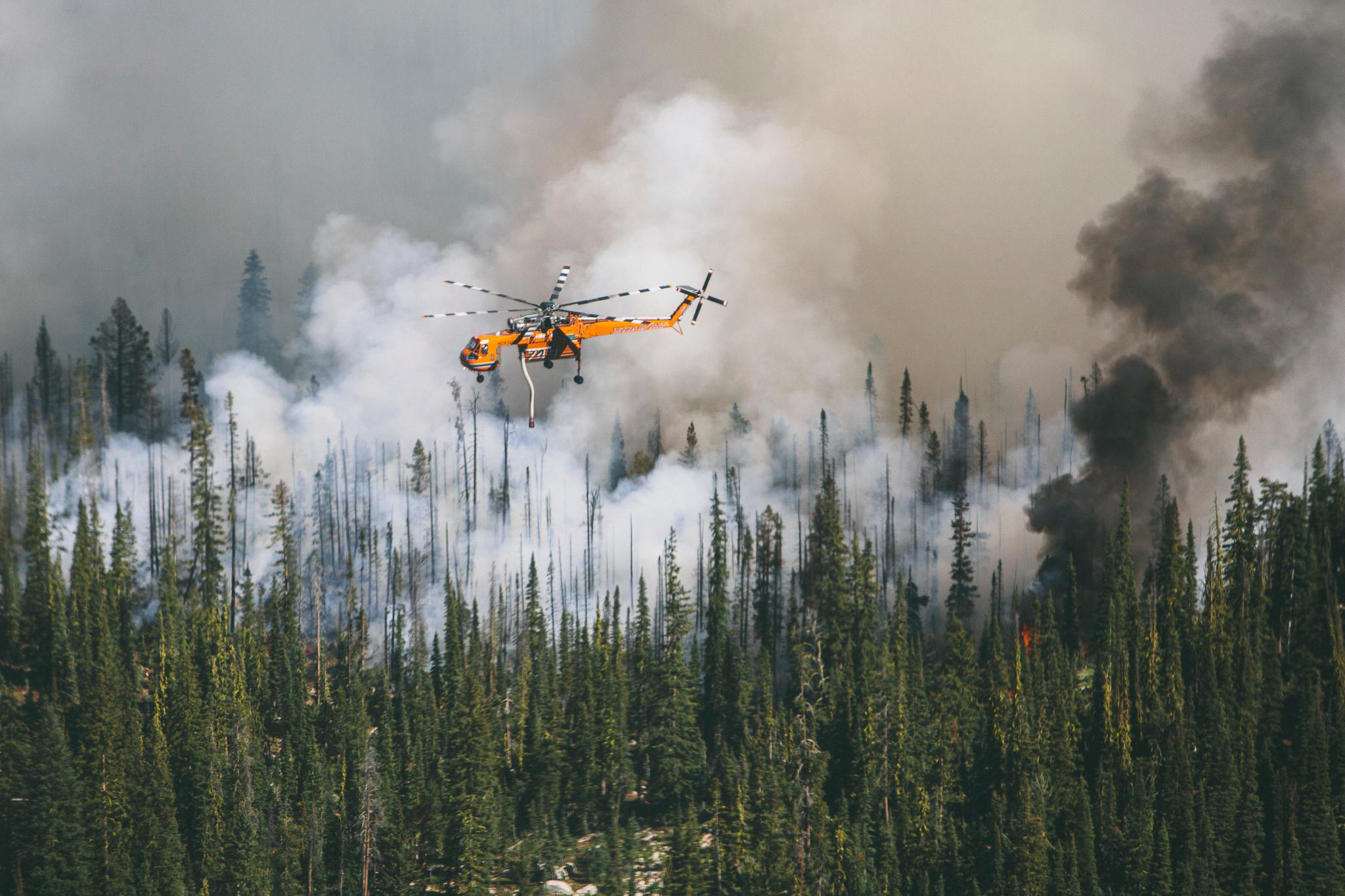
A Sikorsky S-64 Skycrane fighting the Ridge Fire, which burned 5,315 acres (21.51 km^{2}) in 2013

Between 2004 and 2013 an average of 74,325 acres (300.78 km^{2}) were burned by fires per year with a maximum of 346,500 acres (1,402 km^{2}) in 2007 and a minimum of 152 acres (0.62 km^{2}) in 2008. For example, in 2012 there were 26 fires started by people and 109 started by lightning, which together burned a total of 152,000 acres (620 km^{2}). The Trinity Ridge Fire alone burned 146,800 acres (594 km^{2}) over two months, although it was not confined to Boise National Forest lands.

The revised 2010 forest plan recognized the need to develop plans to manage wildfires at the wildland–urban interface, use prescribed fire as a tool to manage ecosystem health, and meet air quality requirements set by the Clean Air Act. The forest operates a fire management plan under federal fire policy that gives fire personnel direction for responding to unintended ignitions. Occasionally, area closures and restrictions on use, such as prohibition of campfires, are implemented to aid in wildfire prevention. Following severe fires, area closures may be put in place to protect the public from risks such as falling trees and landslides. Proactive fire management strategies include prescribed burns and mechanical reduction of fuel levels. For instance, in 2014 Boise National Forest planned to conduct 7,919 acres (32.05 km^{2}) of prescribed burns and 155 acres (0.63 km^{2}) of mechanical treatment. The forest seasonally maintains staff at seven fire lookout towers, while six others remain unstaffed.

== Recreation ==
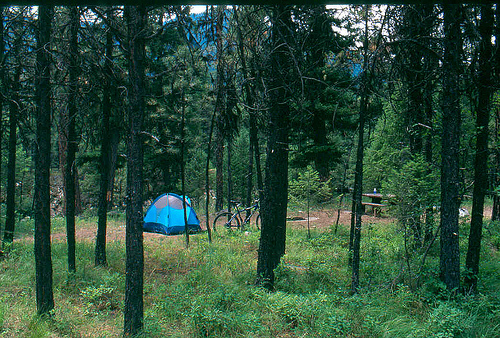
A campsite in Yellow Pine Campground, one of over 70 campgrounds in the forest

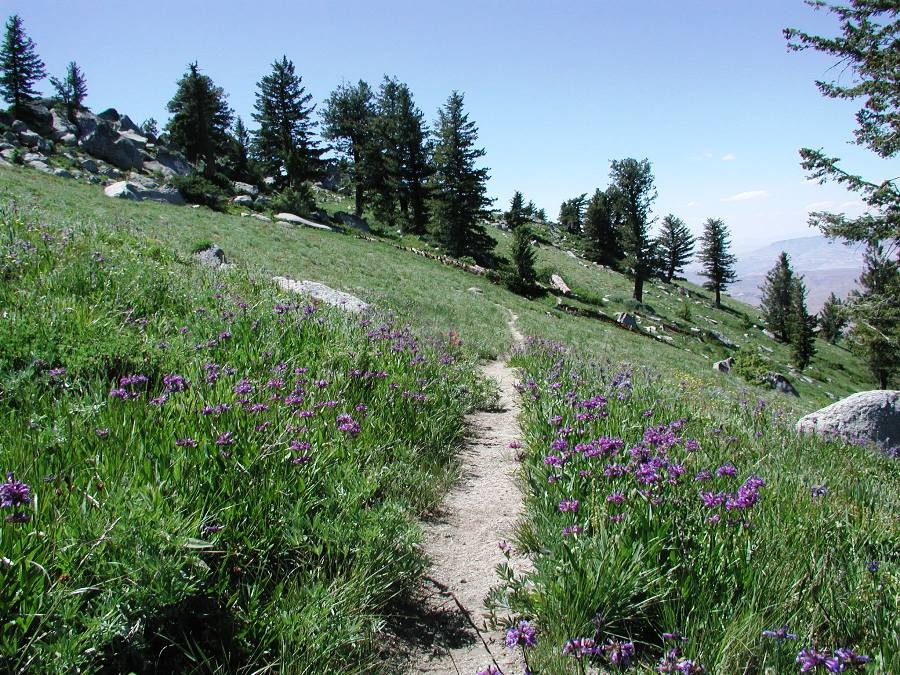
A trail passes through grasses and penstemon on a drier hillside capable of supporting few trees.

There are over 70 campgrounds in Boise National Forest and groups of more developed recreation facilities at the Trinity Mountains, Warm Lake, and Deadwood and Sage Hen reservoirs. As in most national forests, the majority of the land in Boise National Forest is open to dispersed camping (outside of developed campgrounds). One of the forest's fire lookouts, Deadwood Lookout, is now available as a cabin for the public to rent, among other sites. Bicycles are allowed on forest roads and on more than 1,300 miles (2,100 km) of multiple-use trails, whereas over 1,200 miles (1,900 km) of trails are open to motorized recreation. The Danskin Mountains Off-Highway Vehicle Trail System contains 150 miles (240 km) of motorcycle and ATV trails on 60,000 acres (24,000 ha) of land that is generally open from April through November. The forest's Trinity Mountain Recreation Area includes the highest drivable (4-wheel drive recommended) road in Idaho, which ascends to the Trinity Mountain Lookout at an elevation of over 9,400 feet (2,900 m). In 2013 revenues from recreation and special use fees amounted to $454,635, while expenses totaled US$352,550; the difference is allocated to the following season's startup costs.

=== Waterways ===
Rivers in Boise National Forest offer the opportunity for rafting and kayaking through rapids up to class four, with the most difficult sections on the South Fork and main stems of the Payette River. Numerous developed boat launch sites provide access to rivers for whitewater enthusiasts, and Dagger Falls is the primary launching site for visitors to the Middle Fork of the Salmon River and Frank Church River of No Return Wilderness. Motorized boating is permitted on Anderson Ranch Reservoir, Deadwood Reservoir, and Warm Lake.

=== Winter activities ===
During winter, visitors to the forest can participate in activities including snowmobiling, snowshoeing, and downhill and cross-country skiing. The Bogus Basin ski area is located within the forest north of Boise and has 7 chairlifts and 53 runs on 2,600 acres (11 km^{2}) of skiable terrain. There are 137 miles (220 km) of groomed snowmobile trails in the Garden Valley system in the Emmett Ranger District and several Mongolian-style yurts available for rental in winter.

=== Scenic roads ===
Boise National Forest is home to three of Idaho's scenic byways, all of which are paved highways accessible to roadworthy vehicles. The Payette River Scenic Byway is an 80-mile (130 km) route between Eagle and McCall on Idaho State Highway 55. The route follows the Payette River between McCall and Horseshoe Bend, but the majority of the highway does not pass through Boise National Forest; only a small portion north of Horseshoe Bend is in the Emmett Ranger District. Over half of the 35-mile (56 km) Wildlife Canyon Scenic Byway, which travels between highway 55 and Lowman, passes through the forest, parallels the South Fork of the Payette River, and is signed as the Banks-Lowman Road. The Ponderosa Pine Scenic Byway is a 130-mile (210 km) road between Stanley and Boise following Idaho State Highway 21. This route passes over Arrowrock Reservoir and through Idaho City and Lowman, where it connects with the Wildlife Canyon Byway. North and east of Lowman the byway partially follows the South Fork of the Payette River before ascending to the 7,037-foot (2,145 m) Banner Creek Summit at the forest's boundary with Salmon-Challis National Forest.

== See also ==
- List of national forests of the United States
