= Two Point Mountain =

Two Point Mountain refers to one of these mountain peaks:

- Two Point Mountain (Idaho) - highest summit of the Boise Mountains
- Two Point Mountain (Washington)
