= Trinity Mountain (Idaho) =

Mountain in Idaho, United States

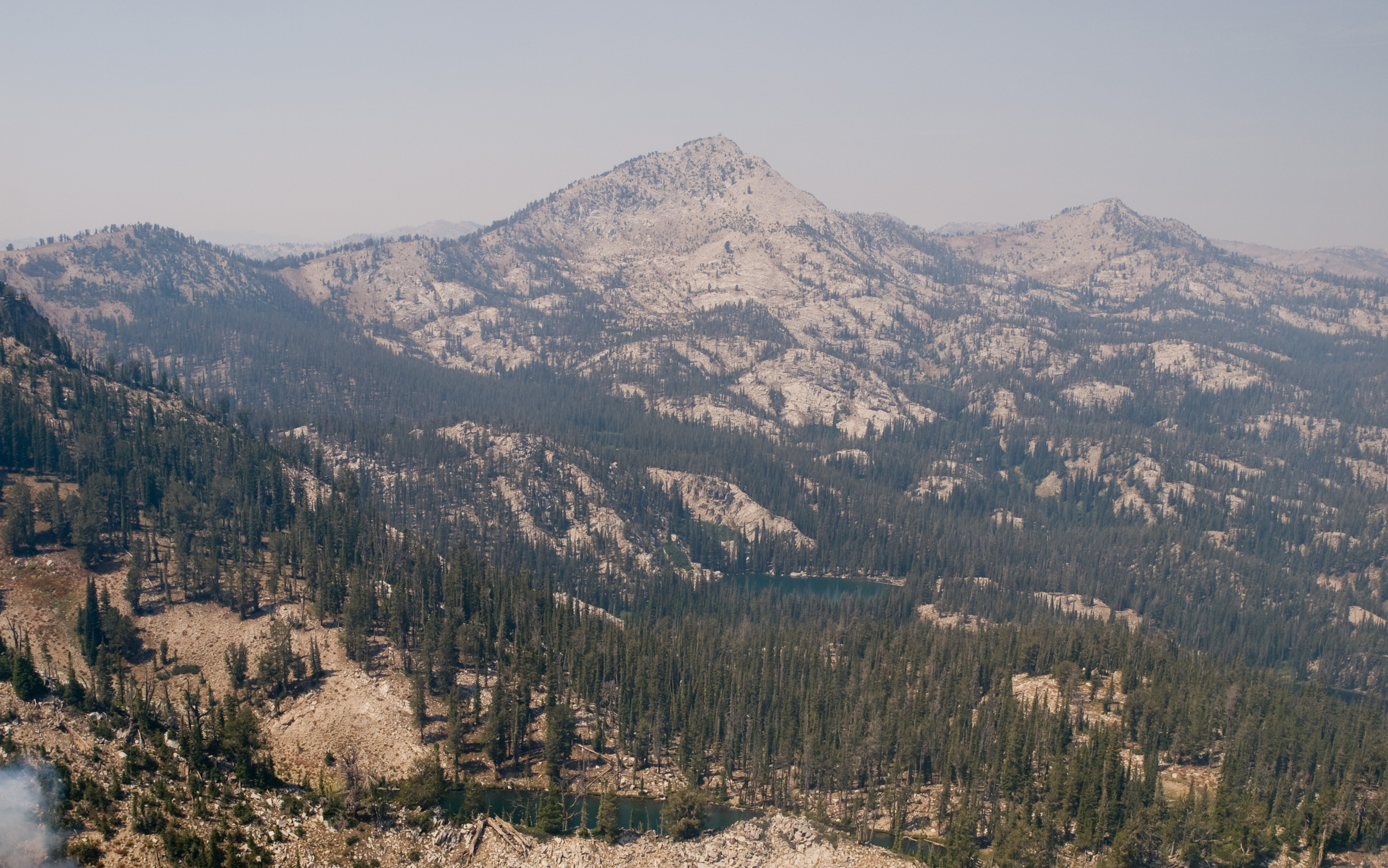
- Trinity Mountain during the Elk Complex Fire

Highest point
- Elevation: 9,451 ft (2,881 m)
- Prominence: 2,371 ft (723 m)
- Isolation: 11.63 mi (18.72 km)
- Coordinates: 43°35′56″N 115°25′44″W

Geography
- Location within Idaho
- Location: Elmore County, Idaho, United States
- Parent range: Boise Mountains
- Topo map: USGS Trinity Mountain

Climbing
- Easiest route: Hiking, class 1

Trinity Mountain is the highest point in the Trinity Mountains, a subrange of the Boise Mountains in Boise National Forest, Idaho with a summit elevation of 9,451 feet (2,881 m). It is located 11.63 miles (18.72 km) from Steel Mountain, its line parent, giving it a prominence of 2,371 feet (723 m). Trinity Mountain is within the watershed of the South Fork Boise River.
