= List of lakes of Valley County, Montana (M–Z) =

There are at least 266 named lakes and reservoirs in Valley County, Montana.

== Lakes ==
- Todd Lakes, 48°18′33″N 105°58′26″W, el. 2,657 feet (810 m)

== Reservoirs ==
- Magruder Reservoir, 47°50′59″N 106°50′52″W, el. 2,516 feet (767 m)
- Mahan and Hoyt Reservoir, 48°11′32″N 106°44′21″W, el. 2,113 feet (644 m)
- Mail Reservoir, 48°35′17″N 106°51′23″W, el. 2,621 feet (799 m)
- Mary Black Reservoir, 48°35′20″N 106°53′46″W, el. 2,503 feet (763 m)
- Maverick Reservoir, 47°53′06″N 106°51′21″W, el. 2,323 feet (708 m)
- Mc Kee Reservoir, 47°53′17″N 107°20′11″W, el. 2,572 feet (784 m)
- McCuin Reservoir, 48°01′33″N 107°19′20″W, el. 2,510 feet (770 m)
- McIntyre Reservoir, 48°03′02″N 106°46′16″W, el. 2,270 feet (690 m)
- Middle Reservoir, 48°27′48″N 106°25′23″W, el. 2,661 feet (811 m)
- Moccasin Reservoir, 48°05′28″N 107°06′29″W, el. 2,362 feet (720 m)
- Mosquito Reservoir, 47°59′54″N 106°58′50″W, el. 2,333 feet (711 m)
- Mud Run Reservoir, 48°00′34″N 106°38′09″W, el. 2,231 feet (680 m)
- Neil Reservoir, 47°53′52″N 106°46′20″W, el. 2,411 feet (735 m)
- Nelsons Reservoir, 48°44′20″N 107°08′17″W, el. 2,500 feet (760 m)
- Newberry Flat Reservoir, 48°34′30″N 106°48′01″W, el. 2,762 feet (842 m)
- Newton Reservoir, 48°01′09″N 106°39′36″W, el. 2,165 feet (660 m)
- North Beaver Reservoir, 48°07′50″N 107°06′42″W, el. 2,362 feet (720 m)
- O'Juel Lake, 48°47′46″N 106°35′57″W, el. 2,926 feet (892 m)
- Ola Reservoir, 48°06′09″N 106°47′14″W, el. 2,323 feet (708 m)
- Old Dog Creek Reservoir, 47°58′51″N 106°45′24″W, el. 2,185 feet (666 m)
- Olson Reservoir, 48°00′37″N 106°46′10″W, el. 2,247 feet (685 m)
- Paul Reservoir, 47°55′04″N 106°40′28″W, el. 2,329 feet (710 m)
- Pearson Reservoir, 47°57′49″N 106°51′16″W, el. 2,274 feet (693 m)
- Pines Reservoir, 47°56′34″N 106°45′25″W, el. 2,254 feet (687 m)
- Pippin Reservoir, 48°12′14″N 107°13′25″W, el. 2,484 feet (757 m)
- Post Reservoir, 47°51′53″N 106°53′57″W, el. 2,356 feet (718 m)
- Prairie Reservoir, 47°51′47″N 106°54′39″W, el. 2,382 feet (726 m)
- Quick Reservoir, 48°59′11″N 107°10′21″W, el. 2,904 feet (885 m)
- Rain Reservoir, 48°00′18″N 106°48′42″W, el. 2,274 feet (693 m)
- Rain Reservoir, 47°56′36″N 106°48′42″W, el. 2,221 feet (677 m)
- Reservoir Number 14, 48°14′12″N 106°59′50″W, el. 2,283 feet (696 m)
- Reservoir Number D-Seven, 48°11′20″N 106°46′45″W, el. 2,152 feet (656 m)
- Reservoir Number Four, 48°28′11″N 106°50′41″W, el. 2,507 feet (764 m)
- Reservoir Number One Hundred Forty-eight, 48°12′00″N 106°55′23″W, el. 2,342 feet (714 m)
- Reservoir Number One Hundred Forty-five, 48°08′52″N 106°47′33″W, el. 2,260 feet (690 m)
- Reservoir Number One Hundred Forty-seven, 48°08′15″N 106°50′15″W, el. 2,333 feet (711 m)
- Reservoir Number One Hundred Sixty-eight, 48°10′02″N 106°48′16″W, el. 2,182 feet (665 m)
- Reservoir Number Twenty-eight, 48°12′06″N 106°51′13″W, el. 2,290 feet (700 m)
- Rinnie Reservoir, 48°02′34″N 107°05′37″W, el. 2,392 feet (729 m)
- Road Reservoir, 48°01′22″N 106°42′39″W, el. 2,152 feet (656 m)
- Robber Reservoir, 47°53′36″N 106°49′56″W, el. 2,313 feet (705 m)
- Robin Reservoir, 48°03′29″N 106°50′38″W, el. 2,260 feet (690 m)
- Ruby Reservoir, 48°16′11″N 107°06′18″W, el. 2,431 feet (741 m)
- Ruins Reservoir, 47°56′22″N 107°13′25″W, el. 2,644 feet (806 m)
- Rustler Reservoir, 47°55′16″N 106°46′43″W, el. 2,280 feet (690 m)
- Sage Hen Reservoir, 48°04′21″N 106°46′29″W, el. 2,254 feet (687 m)
- Sage Hen Reservoir, 48°05′23″N 106°58′03″W, el. 2,277 feet (694 m)
- Sage Hen Reservoir Number Two, 48°06′35″N 106°49′59″W, el. 2,398 feet (731 m)
- Salty Glen Reservoir, 47°57′20″N 106°46′28″W, el. 2,208 feet (673 m)
- Script Reservoir, 48°02′18″N 106°57′40″W, el. 2,313 feet (705 m)
- Seagull Reservoir, 48°05′15″N 106°45′17″W, el. 2,283 feet (696 m)
- Seventeen Reservoir, 47°55′26″N 106°51′19″W, el. 2,251 feet (686 m)
- Seventh Reservoir, 47°53′18″N 106°48′19″W, el. 2,359 feet (719 m)
- Short Creek Reservoir, 47°53′34″N 106°56′47″W, el. 2,303 feet (702 m)
- Short Creek Reservoir, 47°53′48″N 106°57′08″W, el. 2,320 feet (710 m)
- Skeeter Detention Reservoir, 47°56′25″N 106°46′08″W, el. 2,244 feet (684 m)
- Skull Reservoir, 47°56′14″N 106°59′41″W, el. 2,438 feet (743 m)
- Snow Blind Reservoir, 47°54′18″N 106°49′31″W, el. 2,293 feet (699 m)
- Somers Reservoir, 48°06′15″N 107°12′05″W, el. 2,470 feet (750 m)
- Soufly Reservoir, 47°51′18″N 106°54′22″W, el. 2,405 feet (733 m)
- South Beaver Reservoir, 48°01′14″N 106°57′17″W, el. 2,260 feet (690 m)
- Stebley Reservoir, 47°49′57″N 106°47′18″W, el. 2,467 feet (752 m)
- Stockman Reservoir, 47°55′36″N 106°47′52″W, el. 2,280 feet (690 m)
- Structure Number 143 Reservoir, 48°12′36″N 106°00′02″W, el. 2,487 feet (758 m)
- Suburban Reservoir, 47°51′10″N 106°53′25″W, el. 2,461 feet (750 m)
- Sunfish Reservoir, 48°04′05″N 106°45′45″W, el. 2,228 feet (679 m)
- Swift Reservoir, 48°36′35″N 107°03′40″W, el. 2,687 feet (819 m)
- T C Drop Dam Reservoir, 47°59′03″N 106°59′09″W, el. 2,310 feet (700 m)
- Target Detention Reservoir, 47°56′03″N 106°47′16″W, el. 2,251 feet (686 m)
- Target Reservoir, 48°54′28″N 107°09′14″W, el. 2,733 feet (833 m)
- Think Reservoir, 47°52′40″N 106°46′59″W, el. 2,461 feet (750 m)
- Three Trees Reservoir, 47°55′21″N 106°57′05″W, el. 2,352 feet (717 m)
- Thunderhead Pit Reservoir, 48°04′14″N 106°52′25″W, el. 2,241 feet (683 m)
- Tiger Reservoir, 47°52′20″N 106°51′11″W, el. 2,372 feet (723 m)
- Timber Reservoir, 48°59′46″N 107°09′38″W, el. 2,923 feet (891 m)
- Time Reservoir, 48°59′30″N 107°08′40″W, el. 2,920 feet (890 m)
- Tiney Pit Reservoir, 48°02′35″N 106°48′26″W, el. 2,201 feet (671 m)
- Todd Lake, 48°18′30″N 105°58′32″W, el. 2,674 feet (815 m)
- Tomahawk Detention Reservoir, 48°04′40″N 106°52′48″W, el. 2,247 feet (685 m)
- Trail Reservoir, 48°01′35″N 106°56′19″W, el. 2,257 feet (688 m)
- Trailerhouse Reservoir, 48°08′55″N 107°12′22″W, el. 2,438 feet (743 m)
- Trapper Reservoir, 48°36′01″N 106°47′42″W, el. 2,825 feet (861 m)
- Tree Reservoir, 48°02′08″N 106°52′10″W, el. 2,218 feet (676 m)
- Triple Crossing Reservoir, 47°58′47″N 107°07′09″W, el. 2,408 feet (734 m)
- Trish Reservoir, 48°06′08″N 106°50′19″W, el. 2,306 feet (703 m)
- Tuna Reservoir, 47°57′53″N 106°52′34″W, el. 2,293 feet (699 m)
- Twin Forks Reservoir, 47°59′58″N 107°06′10″W, el. 2,398 feet (731 m)
- Two Butte Reservoir, 48°08′22″N 106°56′23″W, el. 2,352 feet (717 m)
- Two Forks Reservoir, 47°51′10″N 106°54′32″W, el. 2,411 feet (735 m)
- Two Reservoir, 47°59′26″N 106°51′24″W, el. 2,313 feet (705 m)
- Two Tree Reservoir, 47°55′13″N 106°56′13″W, el. 2,329 feet (710 m)
- ULT Reservoir, 47°57′10″N 107°09′15″W, el. 2,484 feet (757 m)
- Uphans Reservoir, 48°06′38″N 106°55′08″W, el. 2,342 feet (714 m)
- Upper Lone Tree Reservoir, 48°03′24″N 107°11′38″W, el. 2,552 feet (778 m)
- Valley Reservoir, 47°50′45″N 107°00′49″W, el. 2,444 feet (745 m)
- Vic Reservoir, 47°56′40″N 106°42′30″W, el. 2,379 feet (725 m)
- VR 33 Reservoir, 47°54′47″N 106°37′55″W, el. 2,461 feet (750 m)
- VR 44 Reservoir, 47°54′07″N 106°42′03″W, el. 2,418 feet (737 m)
- VR 78 Reservoir, 47°59′41″N 106°38′10″W, el. 2,388 feet (728 m)
- VR-105 Reservoir, 48°03′37″N 106°44′45″W, el. 2,228 feet (679 m)
- VR-167 Reservoir, 48°06′38″N 106°50′01″W, el. 2,402 feet (732 m)
- VR-2 Reservoir, 48°09′45″N 107°02′41″W, el. 2,323 feet (708 m)
- VR-80 Reservoir, 48°29′32″N 106°57′44″W, el. 2,372 feet (723 m)
- Wagon Top Reservoir, 48°12′52″N 106°58′03″W, el. 2,372 feet (723 m)
- Waste Reservoir, 48°34′13″N 106°54′52″W, el. 2,500 feet (760 m)
- White Rock Reservoir, 47°54′59″N 106°54′58″W, el. 2,326 feet (709 m)
- Whitetail Reservoir, 47°57′22″N 107°07′04″W, el. 2,444 feet (745 m)
- Wilderness Reservoir, 47°58′47″N 106°50′20″W, el. 2,323 feet (708 m)
- Wilderness Reservoir, 48°00′57″N 106°51′30″W, el. 2,382 feet (726 m)
- Willow Bunch Reservoir, 47°59′35″N 107°04′24″W, el. 2,365 feet (721 m)
- Willow Creek Flat Reservoir, 47°58′49″N 106°42′56″W, el. 2,208 feet (673 m)
- Willow Flat Reservoir, 47°59′14″N 106°42′08″W, el. 2,195 feet (669 m)
- Wilson Reservoir, 48°05′39″N 106°48′04″W, el. 2,365 feet (721 m)
- Winter Day Reservoir, 47°59′33″N 106°52′07″W, el. 2,342 feet (714 m)
- York Reservoir, 48°36′56″N 107°05′17″W, el. 2,648 feet (807 m)
- Your Name Reservoir, 47°55′50″N 106°57′23″W, el. 2,369 feet (722 m)

== See also ==
- List of lakes in Montana
