= Steel Mountain =

Mountain in Elmore County, Idaho

- Location within Idaho

Highest point
- Elevation: 9,730 ft (2,970 m)
- Prominence: 2,188 ft (667 m)
- Isolation: 17.08 mi (27.49 km)
- Coordinates: 43°44′49″N 115°19′03″W

Geography
- Location: Elmore County, Idaho, United States
- Parent range: Boise Mountains
- Topo map: USGS Rocky Bar

Climbing
- Easiest route: Simple Scrambling, class 2

Steel Mountain is the highest point in Boise National Forest and the second highest point in the Boise Mountains at an elevation of 9,730 feet (2,970 m). It is located 17.08 miles (27.49 km) from Two Point Mountain, the highest point in the range and its line parent, giving it a prominence of 2,188 feet (667 m).
