= Warm Lake =

Lake in Valley County, Idaho, United States

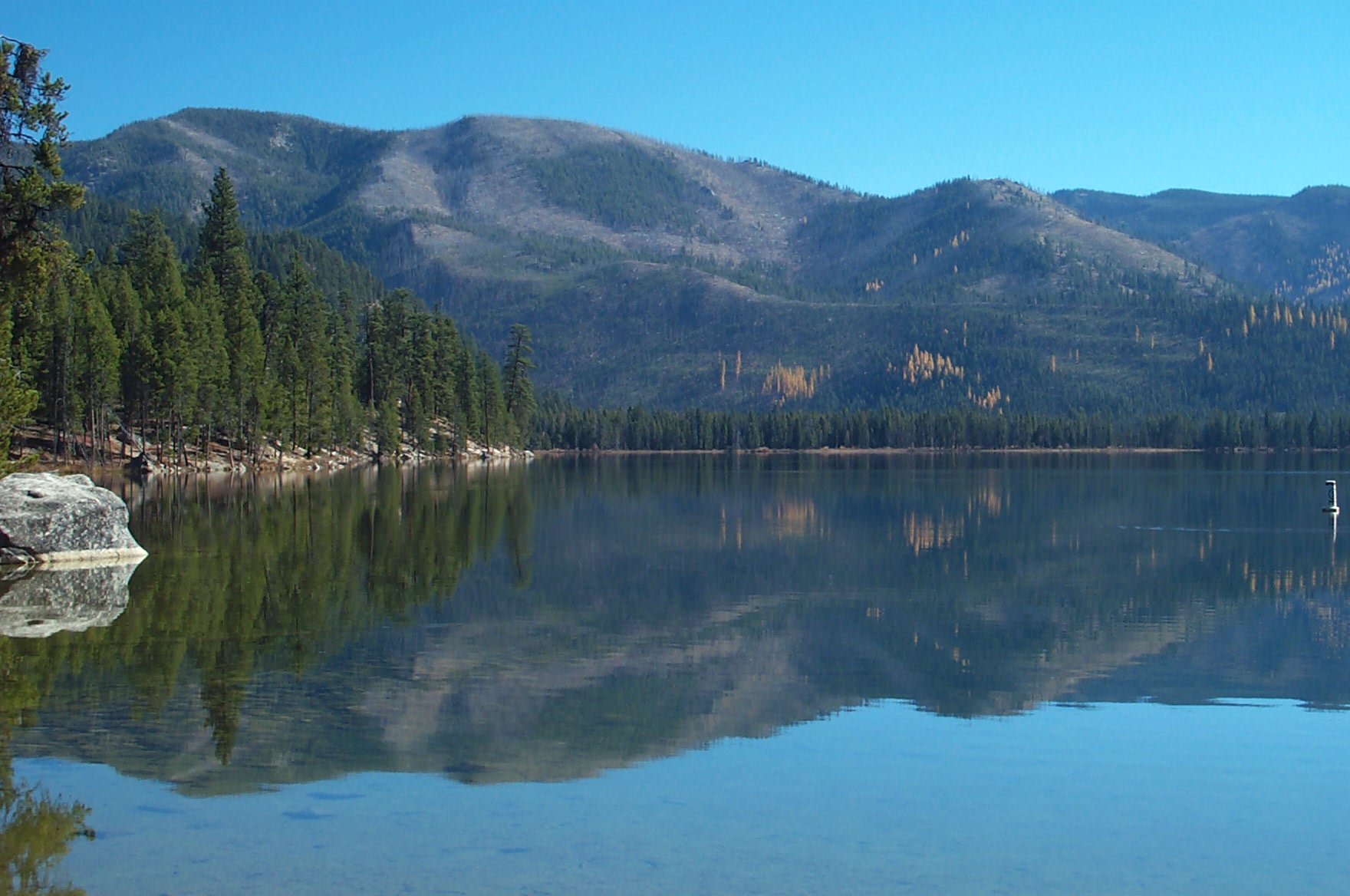

- Location within Idaho Location within the United States
- Location: Valley County, Idaho
- Coordinates: 44.6464°N 115.6689°W
- Primary inflows: Warm Lake Creek
- Primary outflows: Warm Lake Creek
- Basin countries: United States
- Max. length: 1.6 miles (2.6 km)
- Max. width: 0.75 miles (1.21 km)
- Surface area: 640 acres (260 ha)
- Surface elevation: 5,298 ft (1,615 m)

Warm Lake is a 640-acre (260 ha) lake in Idaho, United States. It is located 26 miles (42 km) east of Cascade in Valley County, at 5,298 feet (1,615 m) above sea level. It is the largest natural lake in Boise National Forest.

The lake's abundance of wildlife makes it very popular for camping, fishing, and hunting. Large mammals present in the area include moose, mule deer, black bear, and elk. Large birds present in the area include bald eagles and osprey. The lake contains rainbow, brook, lake, and bull trout as well as mountain whitefish and Kokanee salmon.

There are two lodges at the lake, North Shore Lodge, which was established in 1936, and Warm Lake Lodge, which was established in 1911, and is home to the Banshee Irish Pub, the only medieval Irish Pub in America. The Forest Service operates three campgrounds around the lake.
