= Snowbank Mountain (Idaho) =

Mountain in Idaho, United States

- Location within Idaho

Highest point
- Elevation: 8,320 ft (2,540 m)
- Prominence: 3,080 ft (940 m)
- Isolation: 21.92 mi (35.28 km)
- Coordinates: 44°26′25″N 116°07′35″W

Geography
- Location: Valley County, Idaho, United States
- Parent range: West Mountains
- Topo map: USGS Tripod Peak

Climbing
- Easiest route: Hiking, class 1

Snowbank Mountain is the highest point in the West Mountains, in Boise National Forest, Idaho with a summit elevation of 8,320 feet (2,540 m) above sea level. It is located 21.92 miles (35.28 km) from Nick Peak, its line parent, giving it a prominence of 3,080 feet (940 m). The east side of Snowbank Mountain is drained by the North Fork Payette River, while the west side is drained by Squaw Creek, which is also a tributary of the Payette River.
