= Deadwood Reservoir =

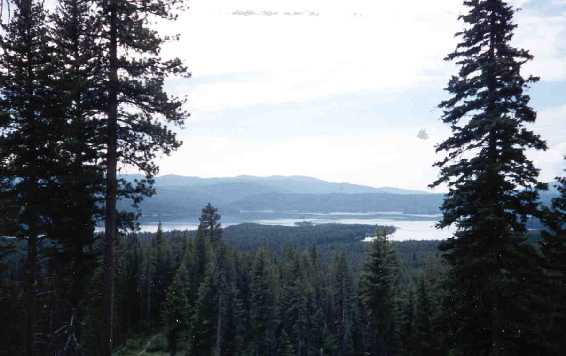

- Location within the United States Location within Idaho
- Location: Valley County, Idaho, U.S.
- Coordinates: 44°17′38″N 115°38′46″W
- Type: reservoir
- Primary inflows: Deadwood River
- Primary outflows: Deadwood River
- Catchment area: 110.7 sq mi (287 km^{2})
- Basin countries: United States
- Surface area: 3,180 acres (12.9 km^{2}; 5.0 sq mi)
- Shore length^{1}: 21 mi (34 km)
- Surface elevation: 5,334 ft (1,626 m) (full pool)
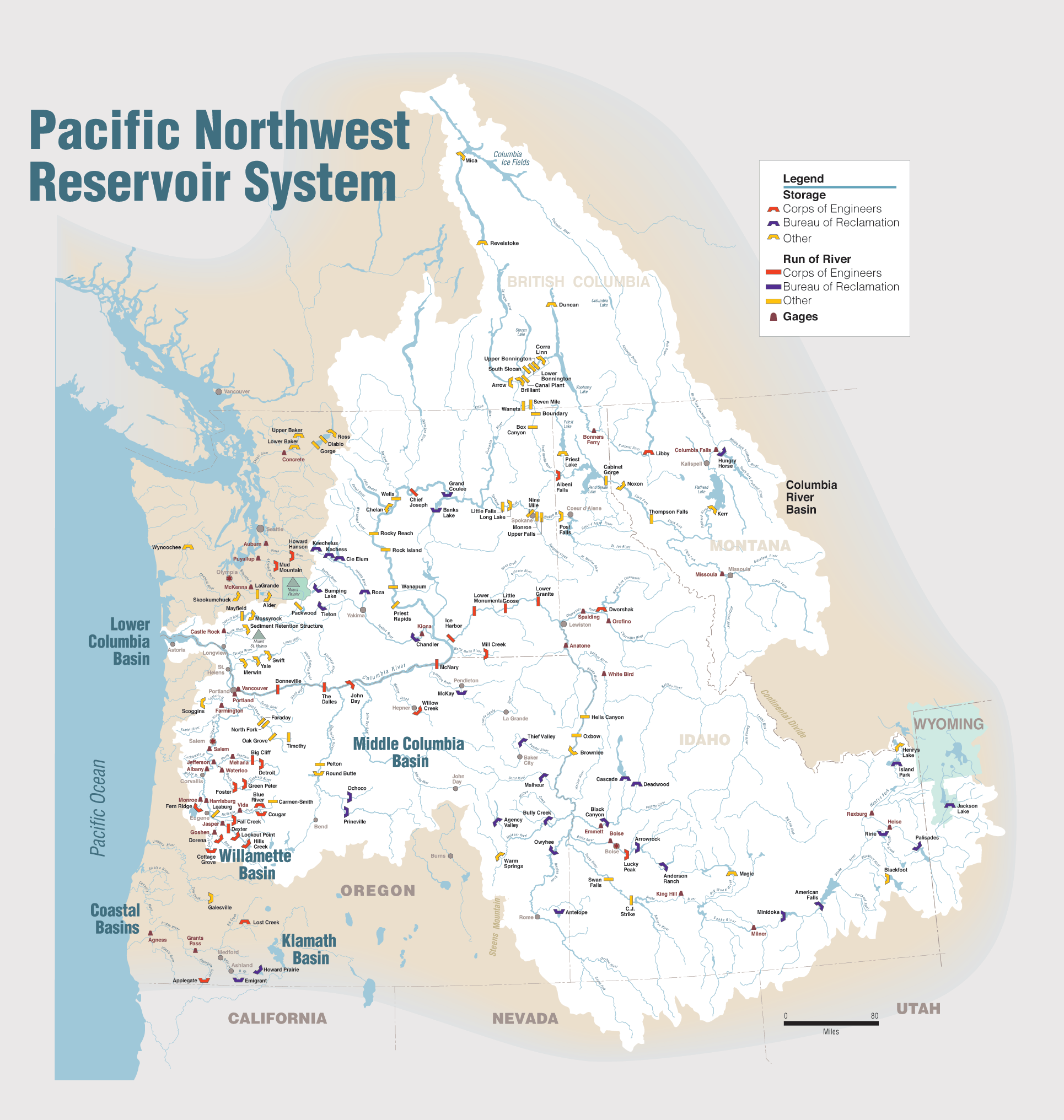
- Columbia River Basin
- ^{1} Shore length is not a well-defined measure.

Deadwood Reservoir is a reservoir in the western United States, in Valley County, Idaho. Located in the mountains of the Boise National Forest about 25 miles (40 km) southeast of Cascade, the 3,000-acre (12 km^{2}) body on the Deadwood River is created by Deadwood Dam. The river flows south from the dam and is a tributary of the South Fork of the Payette River. The reservoir and vicinity is commonly used for camping, water skiing, fishing, canoeing, and other outdoor recreation. The full pool surface elevation is just above a mile-high at 5,334 ft (1,626 m) above sea level.

Approved by President Calvin Coolidge in 1928, the isolated site required substantial road building. Construction of the concrete arch dam began in late 1929 and was completed in March 1931.

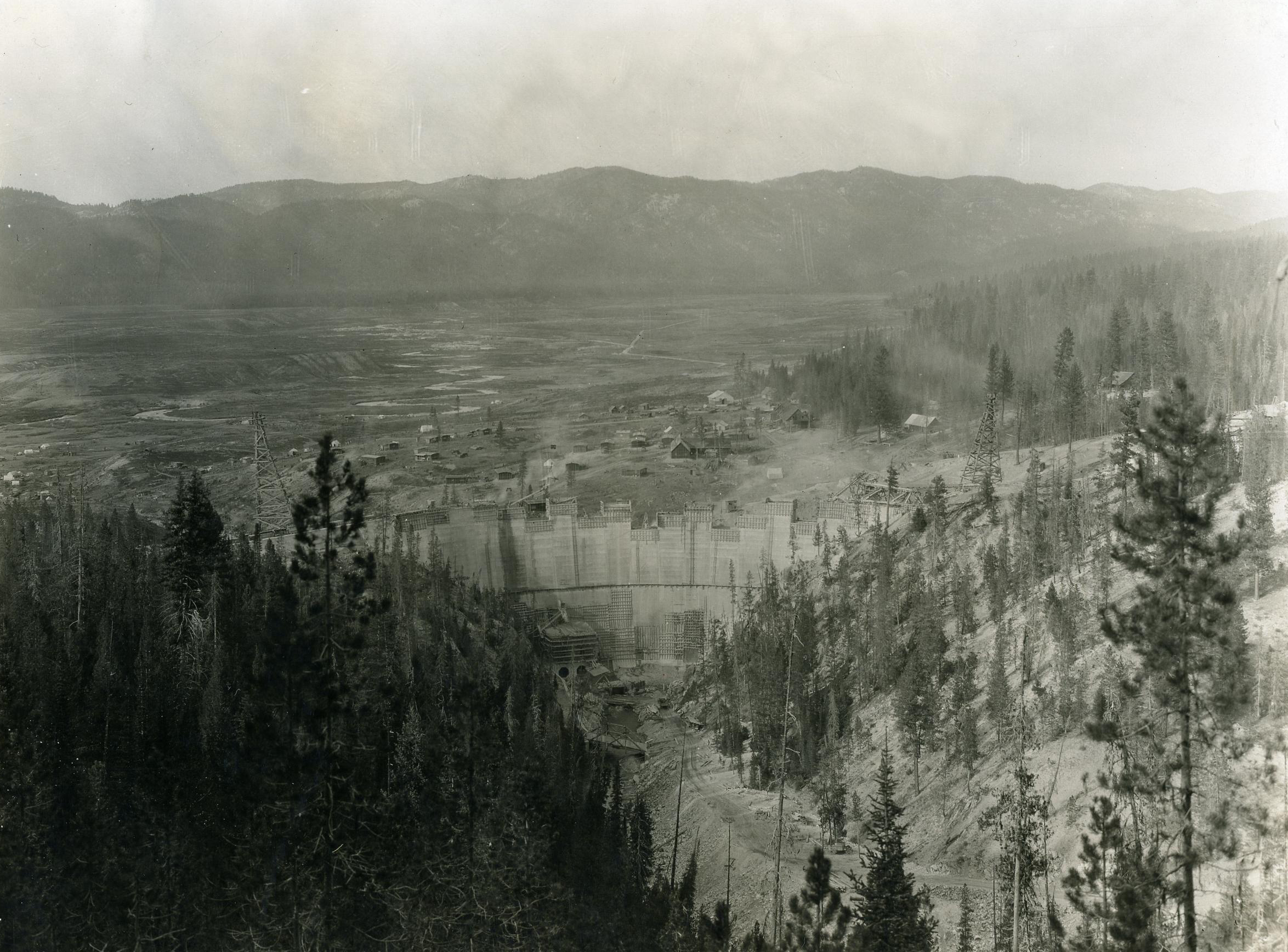
Construction of the dam in 1930

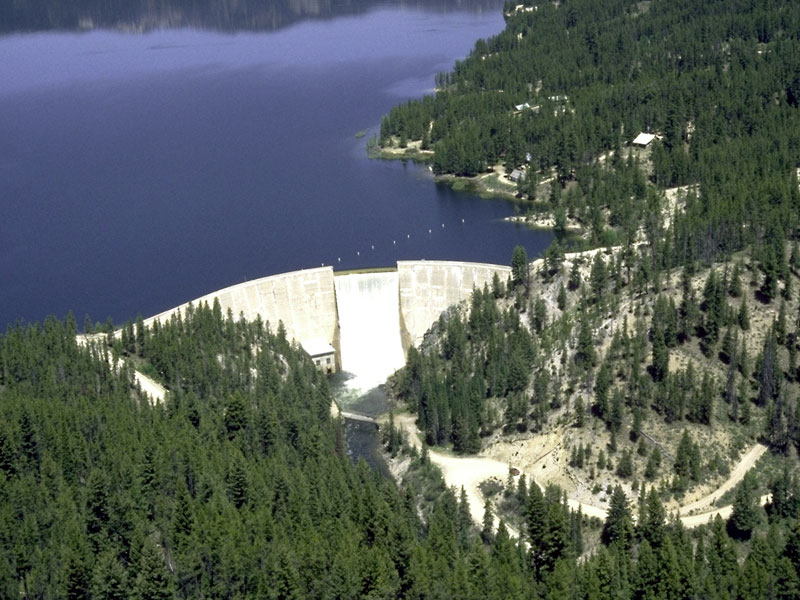
Deadwood Dam in summer 2010

== Climate ==
Deadwood Reservoir has a dry summer humid continental climate (Köppen Dsb), with subarctic climate (Köppen Dfc) characteristics. The temperature can get hot in late July and early August. Rain and wind may frequent the area unpredictably. The climate is much like that of other high-mountain lakes in Idaho.

Climate data for Deadwood Lodge, Idaho, 1991–2020 normals: 5948ft (1813m)
Month	Jan	Feb	Mar	Apr	May	Jun	Jul	Aug	Sep	Oct	Nov	Dec	Year
Record high °F (°C)	58 (14)	59 (15)	65 (18)	74 (23)	88 (31)	93 (34)	100 (38)	97 (36)	94 (34)	87 (31)	67 (19)	49 (9)	100 (38)
Mean maximum °F (°C)	41.0 (5.0)	46.1 (7.8)	54.4 (12.4)	64.4 (18.0)	75.6 (24.2)	86.5 (30.3)	93.0 (33.9)	91.5 (33.1)	85.4 (29.7)	72.6 (22.6)	55.5 (13.1)	40.3 (4.6)	94.2 (34.6)
Mean daily maximum °F (°C)	35.4 (1.9)	36.0 (2.2)	42.4 (5.8)	49.3 (9.6)	61.4 (16.3)	69.6 (20.9)	81.7 (27.6)	81.2 (27.3)	72.9 (22.7)	57.0 (13.9)	40.2 (4.6)	31.4 (−0.3)	54.9 (12.7)
Daily mean °F (°C)	21.5 (−5.8)	23.9 (−4.5)	29.5 (−1.4)	35.8 (2.1)	45.7 (7.6)	52.3 (11.3)	60.6 (15.9)	59.9 (15.5)	52.3 (11.3)	41.3 (5.2)	28.4 (−2.0)	20.2 (−6.6)	39.3 (4.1)
Mean daily minimum °F (°C)	7.6 (−13.6)	11.8 (−11.2)	16.5 (−8.6)	22.3 (−5.4)	30.0 (−1.1)	34.9 (1.6)	39.5 (4.2)	38.5 (3.6)	31.7 (−0.2)	25.5 (−3.6)	16.5 (−8.6)	9.0 (−12.8)	23.6 (−4.6)
Mean minimum °F (°C)	−13.2 (−25.1)	−11.6 (−24.2)	−2.2 (−19.0)	9.5 (−12.5)	18.6 (−7.4)	26.8 (−2.9)	30.9 (−0.6)	29.8 (−1.2)	23.1 (−4.9)	14.2 (−9.9)	−4.5 (−20.3)	−14.3 (−25.7)	−17.8 (−27.7)
Record low °F (°C)	−22 (−30)	−22 (−30)	−11 (−24)	0 (−18)	11 (−12)	23 (−5)	28 (−2)	24 (−4)	17 (−8)	−4 (−20)	−20 (−29)	−24 (−31)	−24 (−31)
Average precipitation inches (mm)	4.92 (125)	4.66 (118)	4.78 (121)	2.88 (73)	3.09 (78)	2.07 (53)	0.63 (16)	0.56 (14)	1.28 (33)	2.96 (75)	4.26 (108)	7.49 (190)	39.58 (1,004)
Average snowfall inches (cm)	51.1 (130)	43.0 (109)	30.0 (76)	10.6 (27)	3.0 (7.6)	0.4 (1.0)	0.0 (0.0)	0.0 (0.0)	0.2 (0.51)	4.9 (12)	24.0 (61)	49.8 (126)	217 (550.11)
Average extreme snow depth inches (cm)	69.6 (177)	78.9 (200)	79.2 (201)	63.8 (162)	33.8 (86)	1.3 (3.3)	0.0 (0.0)	0.0 (0.0)	0.2 (0.51)	4.1 (10)	18.8 (48)	51.1 (130)	83.7 (213)
Source 1: NOAA
Source 2: XMACIS2 (records, monthly max/mins & 2000-2020 snowfall/depth)

== Plant life ==
- Huckleberries
- Various evergreens (mostly pine trees of one sort or another)

== Wildlife ==
=== Fish ===
- Rainbow trout
- Kokanee salmon
- Landlock fall chinook salmon
- Bull trout
- Cutthroat trout

=== Mammals ===
- Chipmunks
- Deer
- Elk
- Moose
- Wolves
- Black bears
- Bats

=== Reptiles ===
- Garter snakes
- Rattle snakes

=== Birds ===
- Bald eagles
- Blue Grouse
- Osprey
- Turkey vulture

== Video ==
- YouTube - video - Deadwood Reservoir - 2009-09-12
