= Sage Hen Dam =

- Location within Idaho
- Location: Gem County, Idaho, United States
- Coordinates: 44°19′34″N 116°11′43″W
- Opening date: 1938
- Operator: Squaw Creek Irrigation Company

Dam and spillways
- Impounds: Sage Hen Creek
- Height: 38 feet (12 m)

Reservoir
- Creates: Sage Hen Reservoir
- Total capacity: 5,210 acre-feet (0.00643 km^{3})

Sage Hen Dam is an earthfill dam on Sage Hen Creek in Gem County, Idaho, United States. Its reservoir, Sage Hen Reservoir, is located in the West Mountains of the Boise National Forest, between Boise and McCall. The dam is owned by the Squaw Creek Irrigation Company and does not produce hydroelectric power.

The reservoir is stocked with rainbow trout and supports a native population of redband trout. Recreational facilities at the site include four campgrounds, a boat ramp, and several fishing docks.
