= Deadwood River (Idaho) =

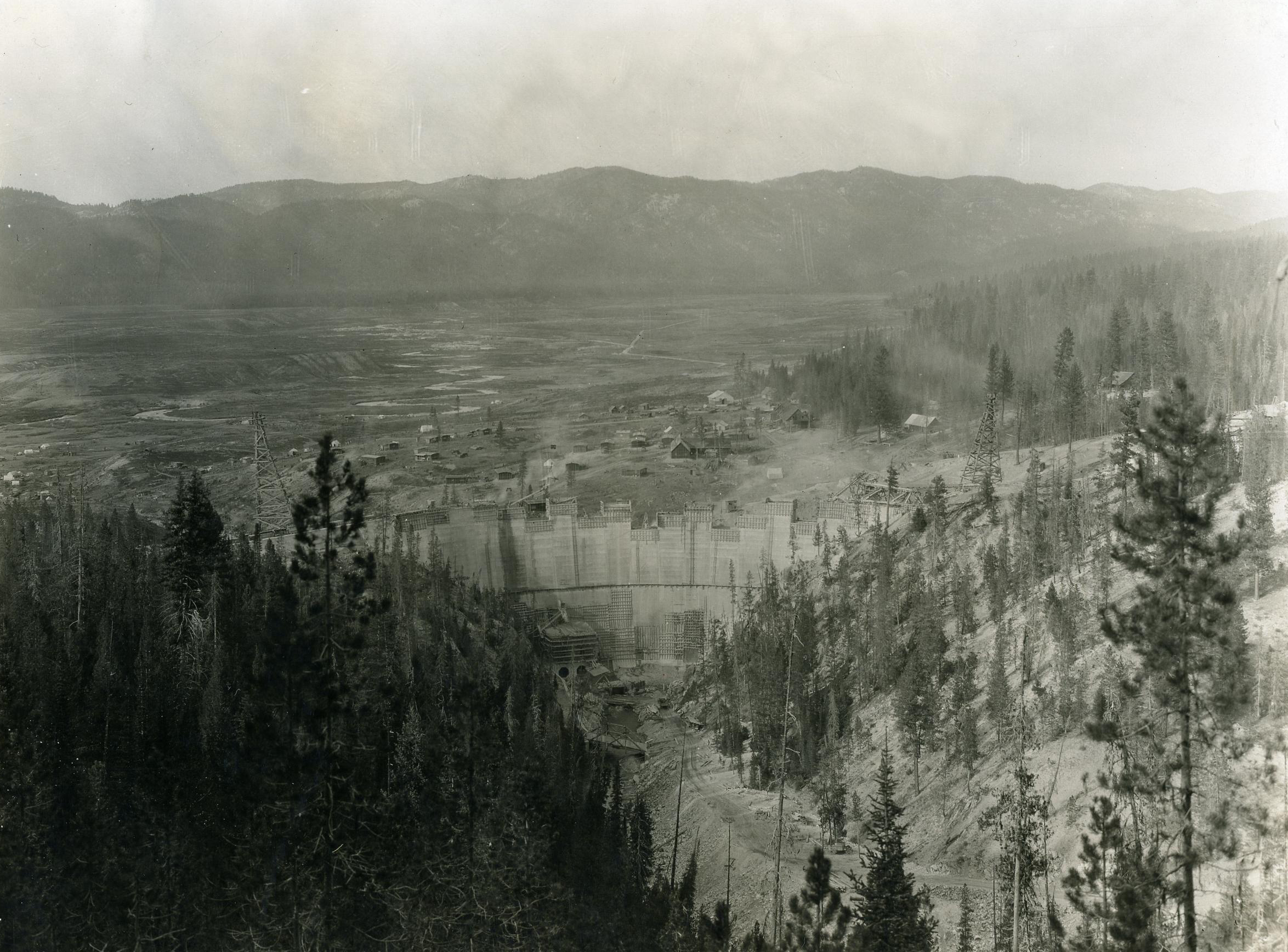
- Construction of the Deadwood Dam in 1930

- Location of the mouth of Deadwood River in Idaho Deadwood River (Idaho) (the United States)

Location
- Country: United States
- State: Idaho
- Region: Valley and Boise counties

Physical characteristics
- Source
  - location: Deadwood Summit
  - coordinates: 44°32′39″N 115°33′48″W
  - elevation: 6,965 ft (2,123 m)
- Mouth: South Fork Payette River
  - coordinates: 44°04′45″N 115°39′30″W
  - elevation: 3,700 ft (1,100 m)
- Length: 43.5 mi (70.0 km)
- Basin size: 109 sq mi (280 km^{2})
- Discharge
  - maximum: 2,580 cu ft/s (73 m^{3}/s)

The Deadwood River is a 43.5-mile (70.0 km) tributary of the South Fork Payette River, flowing through Boise National Forest in Valley and Boise counties, Idaho in the United States. It joins the South Fork Payette River about 3 miles (4.8 km) west of Lowman. The source of the Deadwood River is below the Deadwood summit on forest road 579 in the Salmon River Mountains. The Deadwood Dam was completed in 1931 and impounded the river to form Deadwood Reservoir.
