= Little Camas Dam =

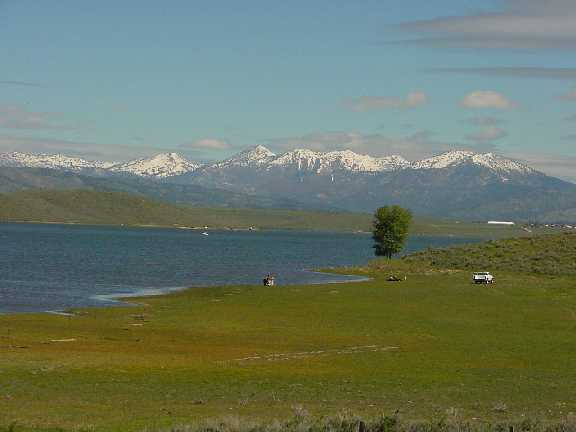

- Location within Idaho
- Location: Elmore County, Idaho, United States
- Coordinates: 43°21′10″N 115°23′08″W
- Opening date: 1912
- Operator: Mountain Home Irrigation District

Dam and spillways
- Impounds: Little Camas Creek
- Height: 44 feet (13 m)

Reservoir
- Creates: Little Camas Reservoir
- Total capacity: 18,800 acre-feet (0.0232 km^{3})

Little Camas Dam is an earthfill type dam on Little Camas Creek, in Elmore County, Idaho, United States. Its reservoir is called Little Camas Reservoir and is northeast of Mountain Home and about 3 miles (4.8 km) east of Anderson Ranch Dam. The dam is owned by the Mountain Home Irrigation District and does not produce electricity. The reservoir is surrounded primarily by Boise National Forest land but also state and private land.

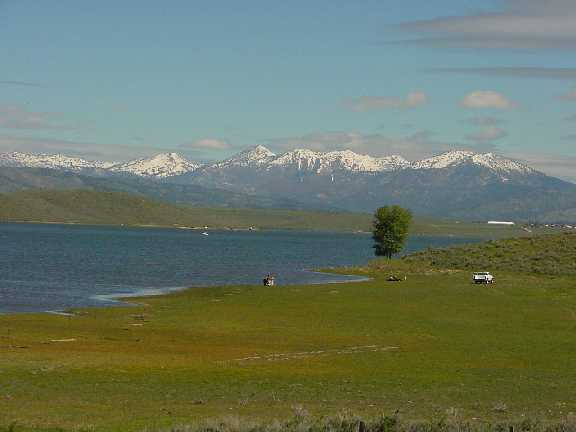
Little Camas Reservoir and the Soldier Mountains
