= West Mountains =

Mountain range in Idaho

- Location within Idaho

Highest point
- Peak: Snowbank Mountain
- Elevation: 8,320 ft (2,540 m)
- Coordinates: 44°27′05″N 116°07′43″W

Dimensions
- Length: 76 mi (122 km) N/S
- Width: 46 mi (74 km) E/W
- Area: 2,028 mi^{2} (5,250 km^{2})

Geography
- Country: United States
- State: Idaho
- Range coordinates: 44°28′00″N 116°14′04″W
- Borders on: Boise Mountains
- Topo map: USGS Tripod Peak

The West Mountains are a mountain range in the U.S. state of Idaho, spanning part of Boise and Payette national forests. The highest point in the range is Snowbank Mountain at an elevation of 8,320 feet (2,540 m) above sea level. The range is bordered to the east by the Payette River and the North Fork Payette River, which separate the range from the Boise Mountains.
