= Idaho Batholith =

Batholith in Idaho and Montana, United States

- Stratigraphic range: Cretaceous to Paleogene
- Type: Pluton

Lithology
- Primary: Granite and Granodiorite
- Other: Quartz diorite and Tonalite

Location
- Region: Central Idaho
- Country: United States

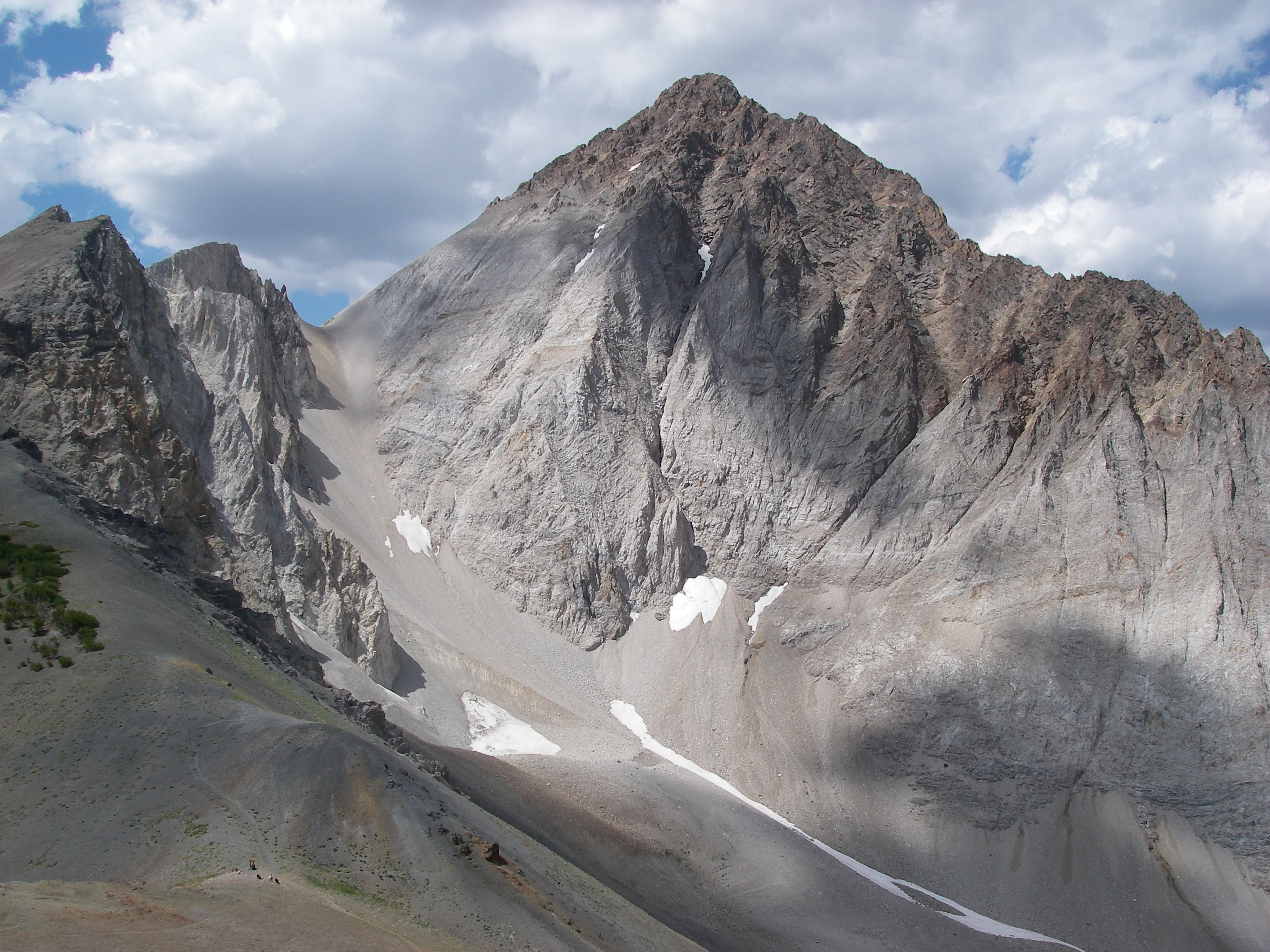
Castle Peak is the highest point on the Idaho Batholith

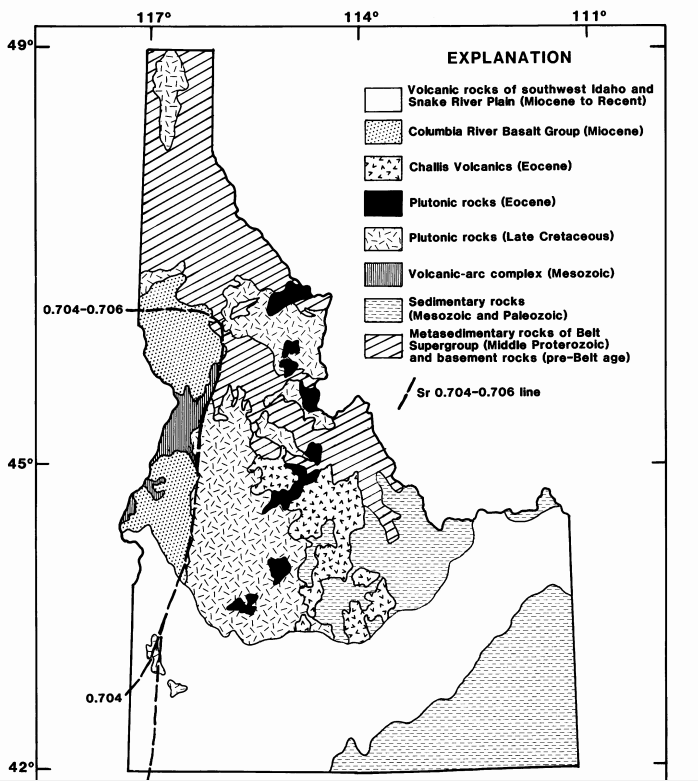
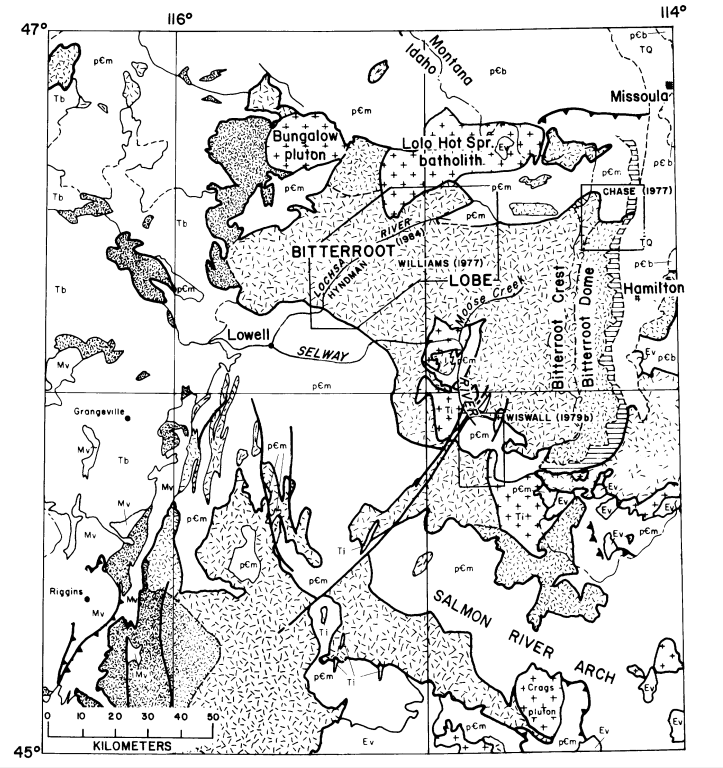
(Left) Geological map showing the Late Cretaceous Plutonic Rocks corresponding to the Kaniksu Batholith, and the Bitterroot and Atlanta lobes of the Idaho Batholith. (Right) Geological map of the Salmon River Arch separating the Idaho Batholith lobes.

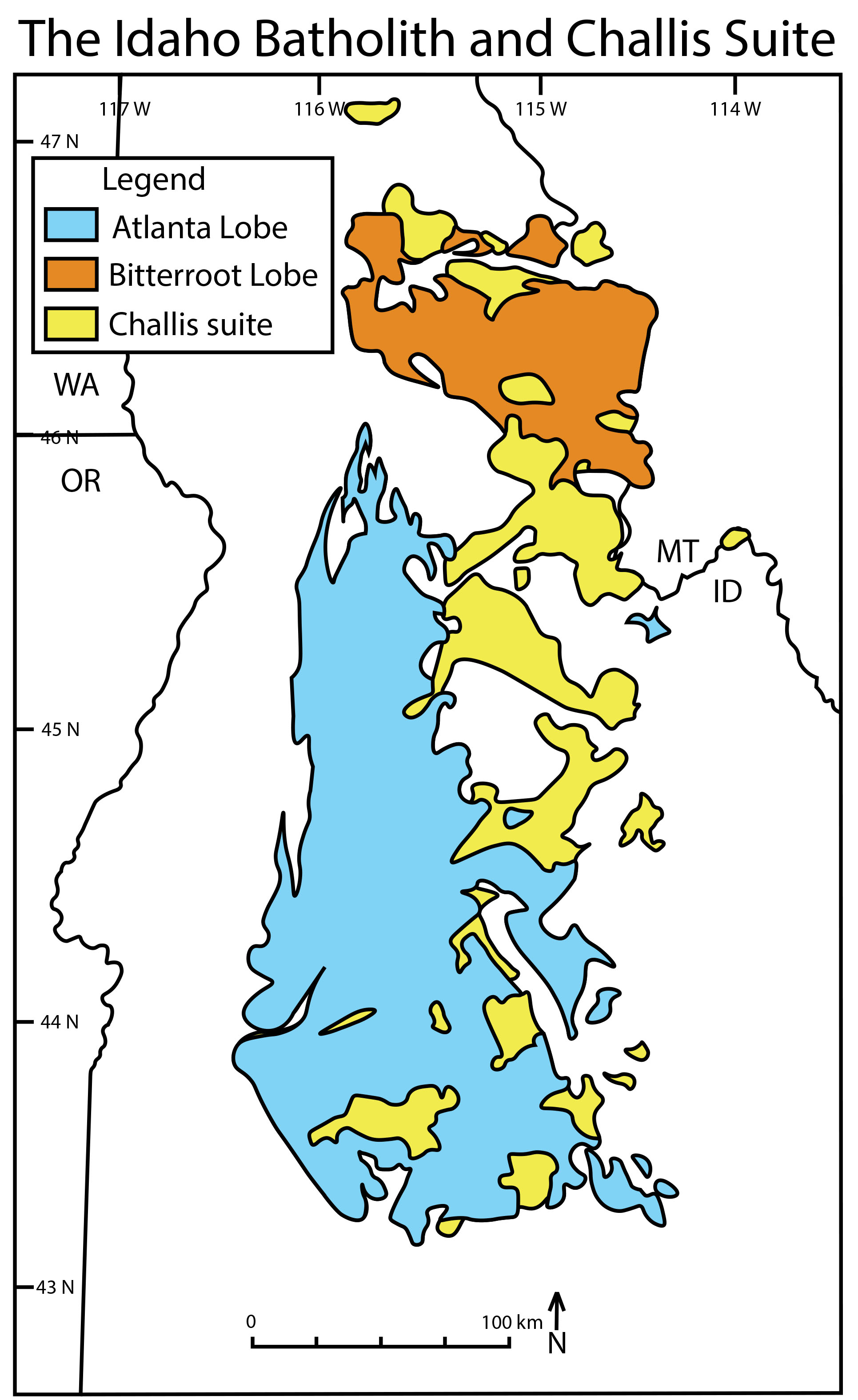
Generalized map of the Idaho Batholith showing the Atlanta lobe, the Bitterroot lobe, and the Challis suite.

The Idaho Batholith is a granitic and granodioritic batholith of Cretaceous-Paleogene age that covers approximately 25,000 square kilometres (9,700 sq mi) of central Idaho and adjacent Montana. The batholith has two lobes that are separate from each other geographically and geologically. The Bitterroot lobe is the smaller lobe and the larger lobe is the Atlanta lobe. The Bitterroot lobe is in the north and is separated from the larger Atlanta lobe in the south by the Belt Supergroup metamorphic rocks that compose the Salmon River Arch. Much of the Atlanta and Bitterroot lobes are in the Idaho Batholith ecoregion.

The overall intrusive event that created the Idaho batholith lasted for around 55 million years from Late Cretaceous to the Eocene (98 to 43 Ma) of magmatism and includes the younger Challis suite which is not considered to be part of the Idaho Batholith. The Challis suite intruded both the Atlanta and Bitterroot lobes of the Idaho Batholith as well as the surrounding areas to the east of the Atlanta lobe. The Challis suite is more petrologically diverse and contains a range of rocks from gabbro to granite.

== Atlanta lobe ==
=== Age ===
The Atlanta lobe was formed in the Late Cretaceous, 98 to 68 million years ago. The early metaluminous suite (98-87 Ma) makes up the southeastern edge of the Atlanta pluton. The border zone suite (92-85 Ma) makes up the western edge of the Atlanta pluton. The Atlanta peraluminous suite (83-67 Ma) makes up the majority of the Atlanta lobe that stretches farther south than the early metaluminous suite and ends farther north than the early metaluminous suite.

=== Structures ===
The Atlanta lobe lacks uniform deformation and foliation across the lobe but contains small areas of localized deformation.

=== Petrology ===
The Atlanta lobe is petrologically homogeneous overall. The magma from the Atlanta peraluminous suite (which makes up the majority of the Atlanta Lobe) is made almost entirely of preexisting continental material and contains biotite-containing granodiorite and two-mica granite. However, the early metaluminous suite (which makes up the southern edge of the Atlanta lobe) is petrologically different from the early metaluminous suite and contains tonalite, granodiorite and quartz diorite. The early metaluminous suite is also distinguished from the Atlanta peraluminous suite by the presence of hornblende and 10 cm long potassium feldspar megachrysts. Like the early metaluminous suite, the border zone suite (which makes up the western edge of the Atlanta Lobe) is made of tonalite, granodiorite and quartz diorite.

== Bitterroot lobe ==
=== Age ===
The Bitterroot lobe was formed in the Late Cretaceous and Paleocene, 75 to 53 million years ago. The Late metaluminous suite (75-69 Ma) makes up a small portion of the Bitterroot lobe that borders the greater Bitterroot lobe. The Bitterroot lobe is mostly made from the Bitterroot peraluminous suite (66-53 Ma) consisting of the central portion of the Bitterroot lobe.

=== Structures ===
The Bitterroot lobe shows regional strain with foliation that strikes to the northwest and dips to the northeast, which is parallel with other natural features in the area such as the Lewis and Clark line. The Lewis and Clark line is an area of weakened crust where major faulting has occurred with steep or vertical dipping and striking to the northwest. This deformation is attributed to the western Idaho shear zone.

=== Petrology ===
The Bitterroot lobe is petrologically similar to the Atlanta lobe. The Bitterroot peraluminous suite (which makes up the majority of the Bitterroot lobe) mostly consists of biotite granodiorite, but with less muscovite-bearing granite than the Atlanta lobe. The late metaluminous suite (which borders the Bitterroot lobe) is made of a range of diorite from, quartz diorite to granodiorite.

== See also ==
- Bitterroot National Forest
- List of mountain ranges in Montana
- List of mountain ranges in Idaho
