= Boise Mountains =

Mountain range in Idaho, United States

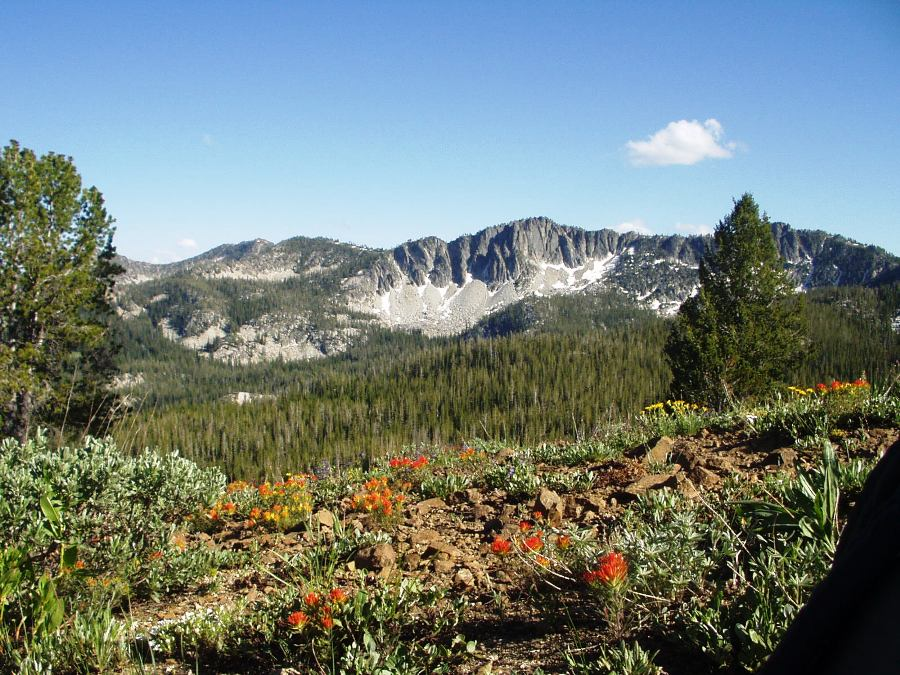
- Mountains and Indian paintbrush (Castilleja sp.) in Boise National Forest

Highest point
- Peak: Two Point Mountain
- Elevation: 10,124 ft (3,086 m)
- Coordinates: 43°44′14″N 114°58′36″W

Dimensions
- Length: 110 mi (180 km) E/W
- Width: 87 mi (140 km) N/S
- Area: 4,724 mi^{2} (12,240 km^{2})

Geography
- Location within Idaho
- Country: United States
- State: Idaho
- Range coordinates: 43°45′01″N 115°30′04″W
- Borders on: West Mountains
- Topo map: USGS Barber Flat

The Boise Mountains are a mountain range in the U.S. state of Idaho, spanning part of Boise and Sawtooth national forests. The highest point in the range is Two Point Mountain at an elevation of 10,124 feet (3,086 m) above sea level.
