= Two Point Mountain (Idaho) =

Mountain in Idaho, United States

- Location within Idaho

Highest point
- Elevation: 10,124 ft (3,086 m)
- Prominence: 1,524 ft (465 m)
- Isolation: 12.67 mi (20.39 km)
- Coordinates: 43°44′14″N 114°58′36″W

Geography
- Location: Camas County, Idaho, United States
- Parent range: Boise Mountains
- Topo map: USGS Newman Peak

Climbing
- Easiest route: Simple Scrambling, class 2

Two Point Mountain is the highest point in the Boise Mountains with a summit elevation of 10,124 feet (3,086 m) located in the Fairfield Ranger District of Sawtooth National Forest, Idaho. It is located 12.67 miles (20.39 km) from Perfect Peak in the Sawtooth Range, its line parent, giving it a prominence of 1,524 feet (465 m). Two Point Mountain is named for having two peaks: its main summit and a second summit about 0.4 miles (0.64 km) to the northwest that rises to an elevation of 10,060 feet (3,070 m). The mountain is within the watershed of the South Fork Boise River where the south side is drained by Bear Creek and the north side by the Ross Fork. No maintained trails lead to either summit.
